= Chanthaburi Mountains =

Mountain range in Thailand

Location of major peaks, in Thailand

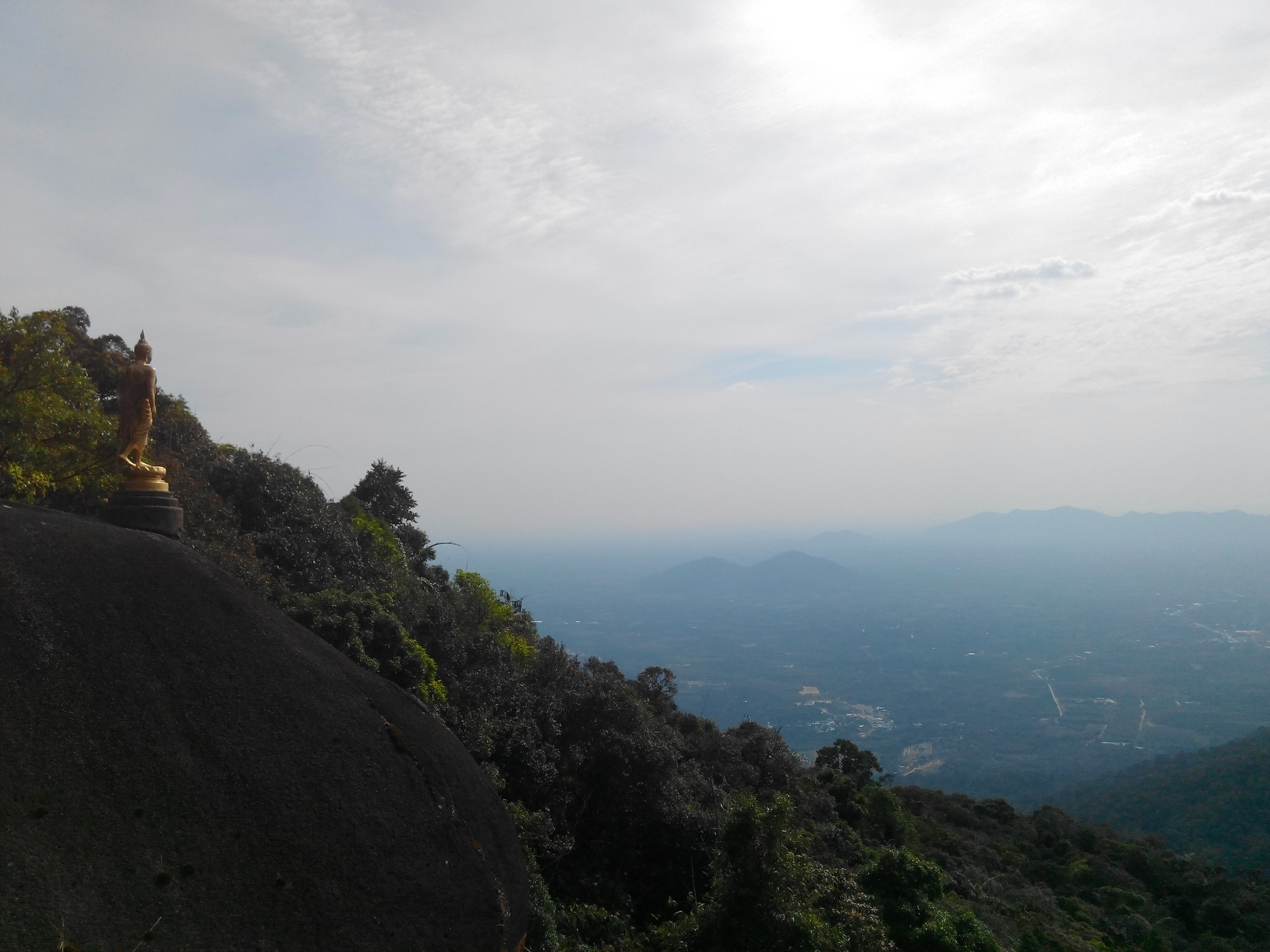
In Khao Khitchakut National Park

The Chanthaburi Mountains (Thai: ทิวเขาจันทบุรี) is a mountain range in Eastern Thailand. It forms the watershed between the Bang Pakong River basin to its north and several short rivers draining into the Gulf of Thailand.

The Chanthaburi Range forms a westward continuation of the Banthat Range (the section of the Cardamom Mountains forming the boundary between Thailand and Cambodia), and part of it is often considered the northwesternmost extension of the Cardamom Range itself. The main Chanthaburi Range forms part of the provincial boundaries between the in-land Chachoengsao and Sa Kaeo provinces to the north and the coastal Chon Buri and Chanthaburi provinces to the south. It is also considered to include three sub-ranges extending southward: the first in Chon Buri Province, including the peaks Khao Khiao and Khao Chomphu; the second forming part of the boundary between Chon Buri and Rayong provinces; and the third forming the boundary between Rayong and Chanthaburi provinces, including the peaks Khao Chamao and Khao Wong.

The length of the Chanthaburi Range is reported at about 170 kilometres (110 mi) or 281 kilometres (175 mi), depending on the areas included in the measurement. Khao Soi Dao Tai is its highest peak at 1,675 metres (5,495 ft) (older sources give 1,640 metres (5,380 ft)), followed by Khao Soi Dao Nuea. Igneous rock in the form of granite is extensively found in the composition of the main range, especially in the area of the two highest peaks. Other notable peaks include Khao Khitchakut and Khao Sip Ha Chan.

The mountains feature several forested areas protected by several national parks and wildlife sanctuaries, collectively known as the Eastern Forest Complex. These include (in decreasing order of size): Khao Ang Rue Nai Wildlife Sanctuary, Khao Soi Dao Wildlife Sanctuary, Khao Khiao–Khao Chomphu Wildlife Sanctuary, Khao Sip Ha Chan National Park, Khao Chamao–Khao Wong National Park, and Khao Khitchakut National Park.
