= Khao Khiao–Khao Chomphu Wildlife Sanctuary =

Wildlife Sanctuary

- เขตรักษาพันธุ์สัตว์ป่าเขาเขียว-เขาชมภู่
- IUCN category IV (habitat/species management area)
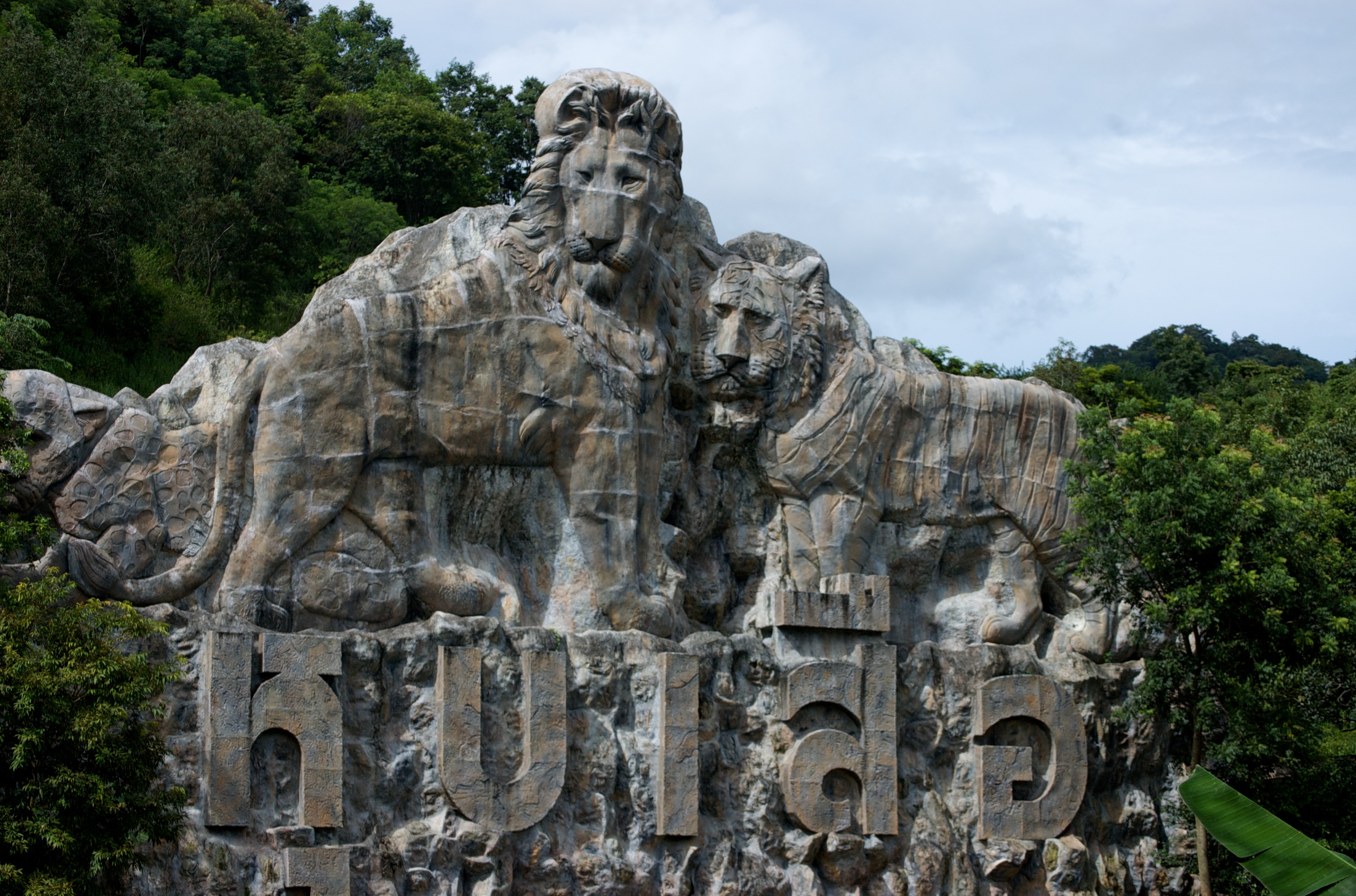
- Entrance to the Khao Khiao Open Zoo at the edge of the wildlife sanctuary

- Location within Thailand
- Location: Thailand
- Nearest city: Chonburi / Pattaya
- Coordinates: 13°12′30″N 101°04′15″E
- Area: 145 km^{2} (56 sq mi)
- Established: 1974
- Governing body: Wildlife Conservation Office

The Khao Khiao–Khao Chomphu Wildlife Sanctuary (Thai: เขตรักษาพันธุ์สัตว์ป่าเขาเขียว-เขาชมภู่) is a protected area in the Khao Khiao Massif, in Chonburi Province, Thailand. Founded in 1974, it is an IUCN Category IV wildlife sanctuary, measuring 145 km^{2} in area.

It is partly covered with dry and moist broadleaf forest in the lower ranges. This is the last forested area in Chonburi Province. The Khao Khiao Open Zoo is at the foot of the mountain area.

== Location ==
Khao Khiao-Khao Chomphu Wildlife Sanctuary in overview PARO 2 (Si Racha)

9) Khao Khiao-Khao Chomphu Wildlife Sanctuary in overview PARO 2

	National park
1	Khao Chamao-Khao Wong
2	Khao Khitchakut
3	Khao Laem Ya–Mu Ko Samet
4	Khao Sip Ha Chan
5	Namtok Khlong Kaeo
6	Mu Ko Chang
7	Namtok Phlio

	Wildlife sanctuary
8	Khao Ang Rue Nai
9	Khao Khiao– Khao Chomphu
10	Khao Soi Dao
11	Khlong Kruea Wai

	Non-hunting area
12	Bang Phra Reservoir
13	Khao Chi On
14	Khung Kraben
	Forest park
15	Khao Laem Sing
16	Namtok Khao Chao Bo Thong
