= Khao Khitchakut National Park =

National park in Chanthaburi Province, Thailand

- อุทยานแห่งชาติเขาคิชฌกูฏ
- IUCN category II (national park)
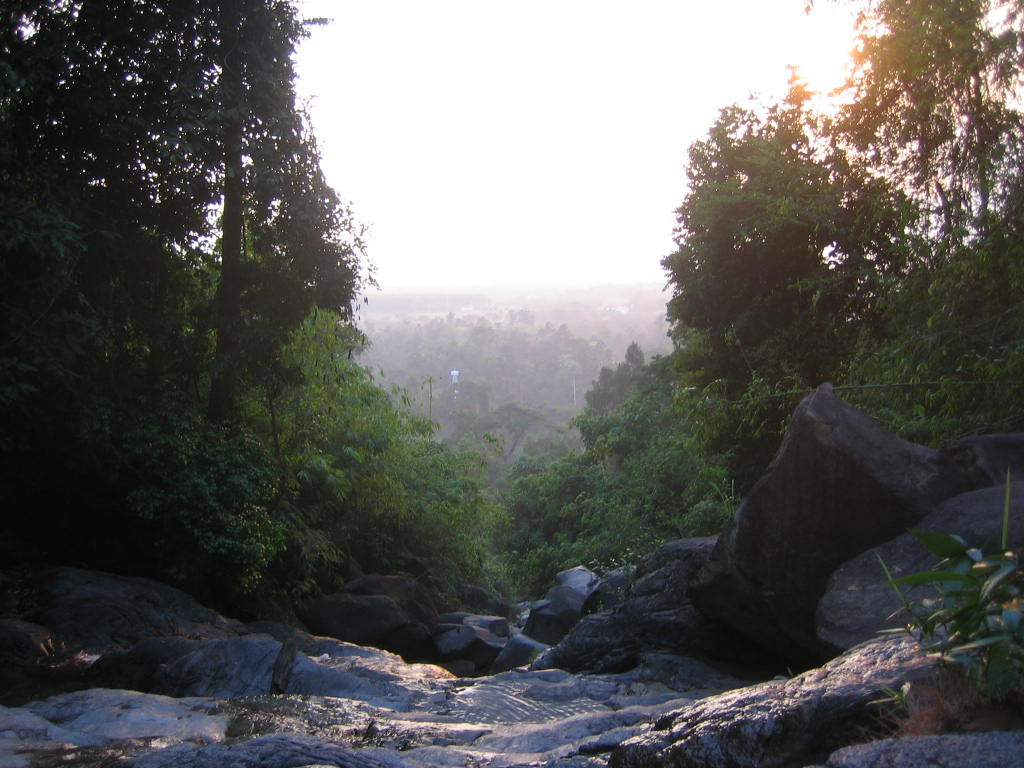
- View from above Krathing Falls
- Interactive map of Khao Khitchakut National Park
- Location: Chanthaburi Province, Thailand
- Nearest city: Chanthaburi
- Coordinates: 12°50′44″N 102°9′35″E
- Area: 59 km^{2} (23 sq mi)
- Established: 4 May 1977
- Visitors: 1,179,671 (in 2019)
- Governing body: Department of National Parks, Wildlife and Plant Conservation (DNP)

Khao Khitchakut National Park (Thai: อุทยานแห่งชาติเขาคิชฌกูฏ) is a national park in Chanthaburi Province, Thailand. The park is located in the Soi Dao Mountains, the Thai part of the much larger Cardamom Mountains, and is home to waterfalls and forests. The venerated Buddha footprint is also within the park premises. On 4 May 1977, Khao Khitchakut was designated Thailand's 14th National Park.

== Geography ==
Khao Khitchakut National Park is 28 kilometres (17 mi) northeast of Chanthaburi town in Khao Khitchakut District. The park's area is 36,444 rai ~ 59 square kilometres (23 sq mi). The highest point is Khao Phra Bat peak at 1,085 metres (3,560 ft). The park, one of Thailand's smallest national parks, borders the much larger Khao Soi Dao Wildlife Sanctuary.

== Attractions ==
The Khao Phra Bat mountaintop is the site of a Buddha footprint and is an important religious place for Thai Buddhists. During the time around the Magha Puja holiday (in February or March) large numbers of visitors make the pilgrimage here. Also on Khao Phra Bat peak there are rock formations to which the shapes of various objects have been attributed: a pagoda, a monk's alms bowl, a turtle and an elephant.

The park's largest waterfall is Krathing, a waterfall of 13 separate levels, intersecting nature trails at various levels. These falls are fed by the Chanthaburi River. Other park waterfalls include Changsay and Klong Piboon.

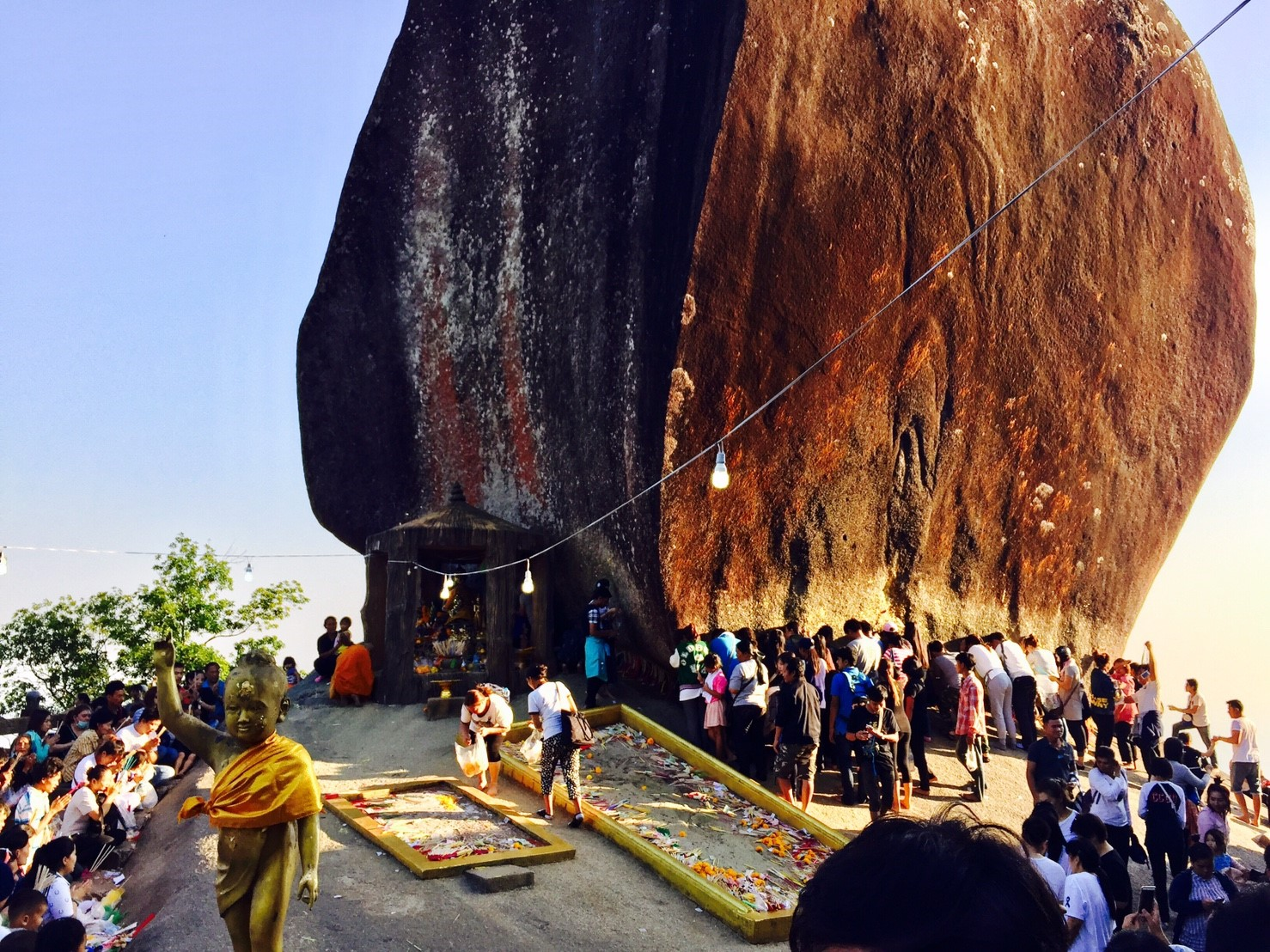
The Buddha Footprint site

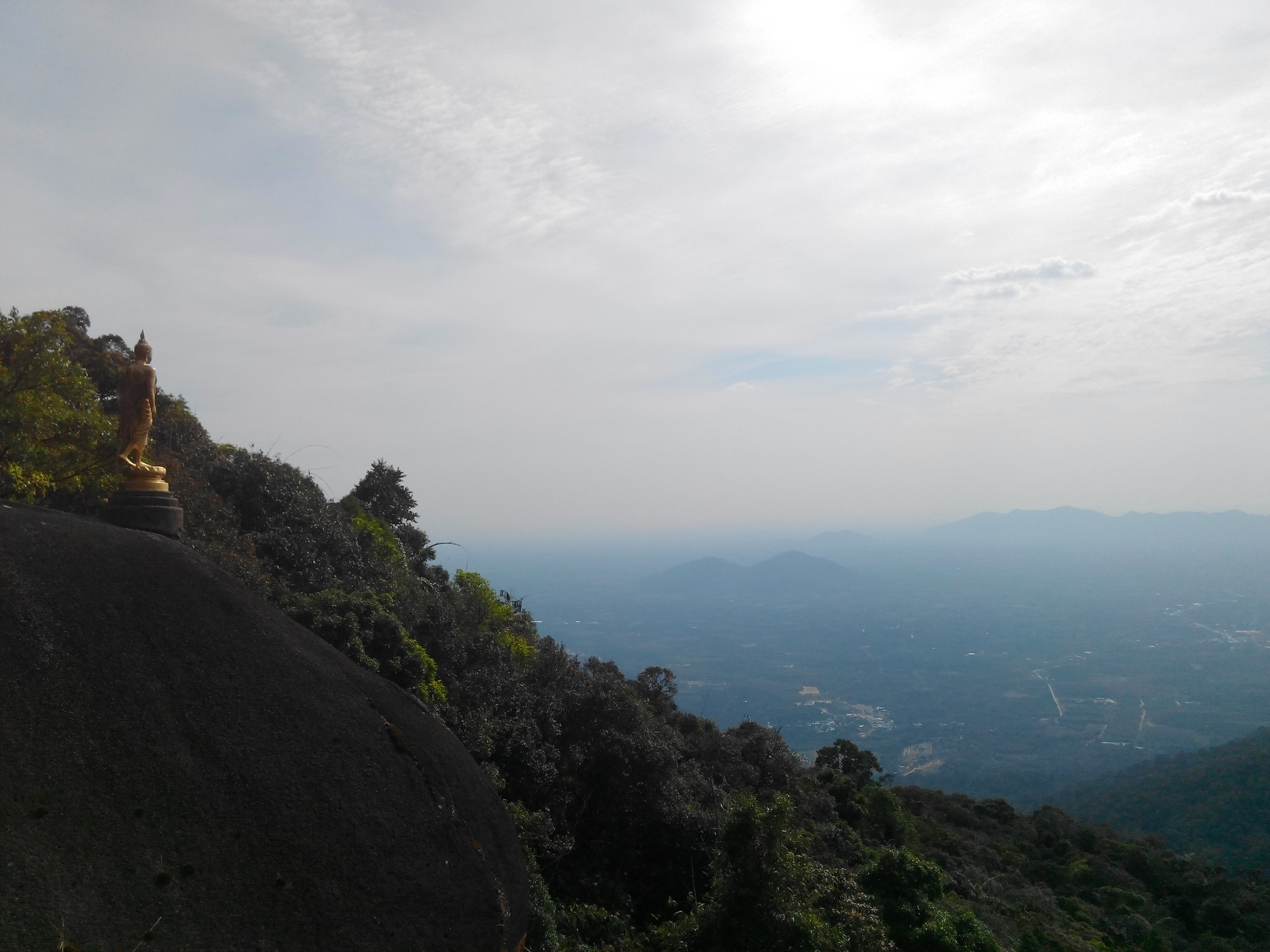

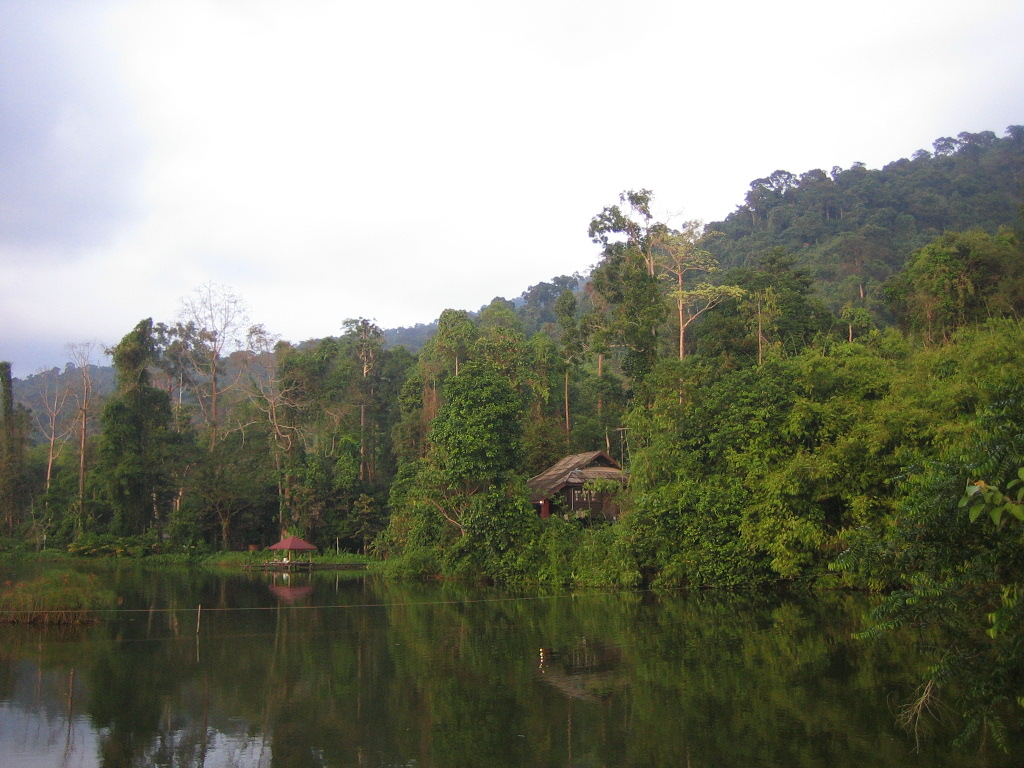
Camp site near Krathing Falls

== Flora and fauna ==
Plant species in the park include Dalbergia cochinchinensis, Pterocarpus macrocarpus, Afzelia xylocarpa, Dipterocarpus tuberculatus, Xylia xylocarpa and Lagerstroemia calyculata. Animals in the park include gaur, Asiatic black bear, sambar, northern red muntjac and serow. Herds of wild elephants have also been sighted here. Bird life includes Asian koel, blue-winged pitta, hooded pitta and Oriental magpie-robin.

== Location ==
Khao Khitchakut National Park in overview PARO 2 (Si Racha)

2) Khao Khitchakut National Park in overview PARO 2 (Si Racha)

	National park
1	Khao Chamao-Khao Wong
2	Khao Khitchakut
3	Khao Laem Ya–Mu Ko Samet
4	Khao Sip Ha Chan
5	Namtok Khlong Kaeo
6	Mu Ko Chang
7	Namtok Phlio

	Wildlife sanctuary
8	Khao Ang Rue Nai
9	Khao Khio– Khao Chomphu
10	Khao Soi Dao
11	Khlong Kruea Wai

	Non-hunting area
12	Bang Phra Reservoir
13	Khao Chi On
14	Khung Kraben
	Forest park
15	Khao Laem Sing
16	Namtok Khao Chao Bo Thong

== See also ==
- List of national parks of Thailand
- List of Protected Areas Regional Offices of Thailand
