= Khao Laem Ya–Mu Ko Samet National Park =

National Park in Thailand

- เขาแหลมหญ้า-หมู่เกาะเสม็ด
- IUCN category II (national park)
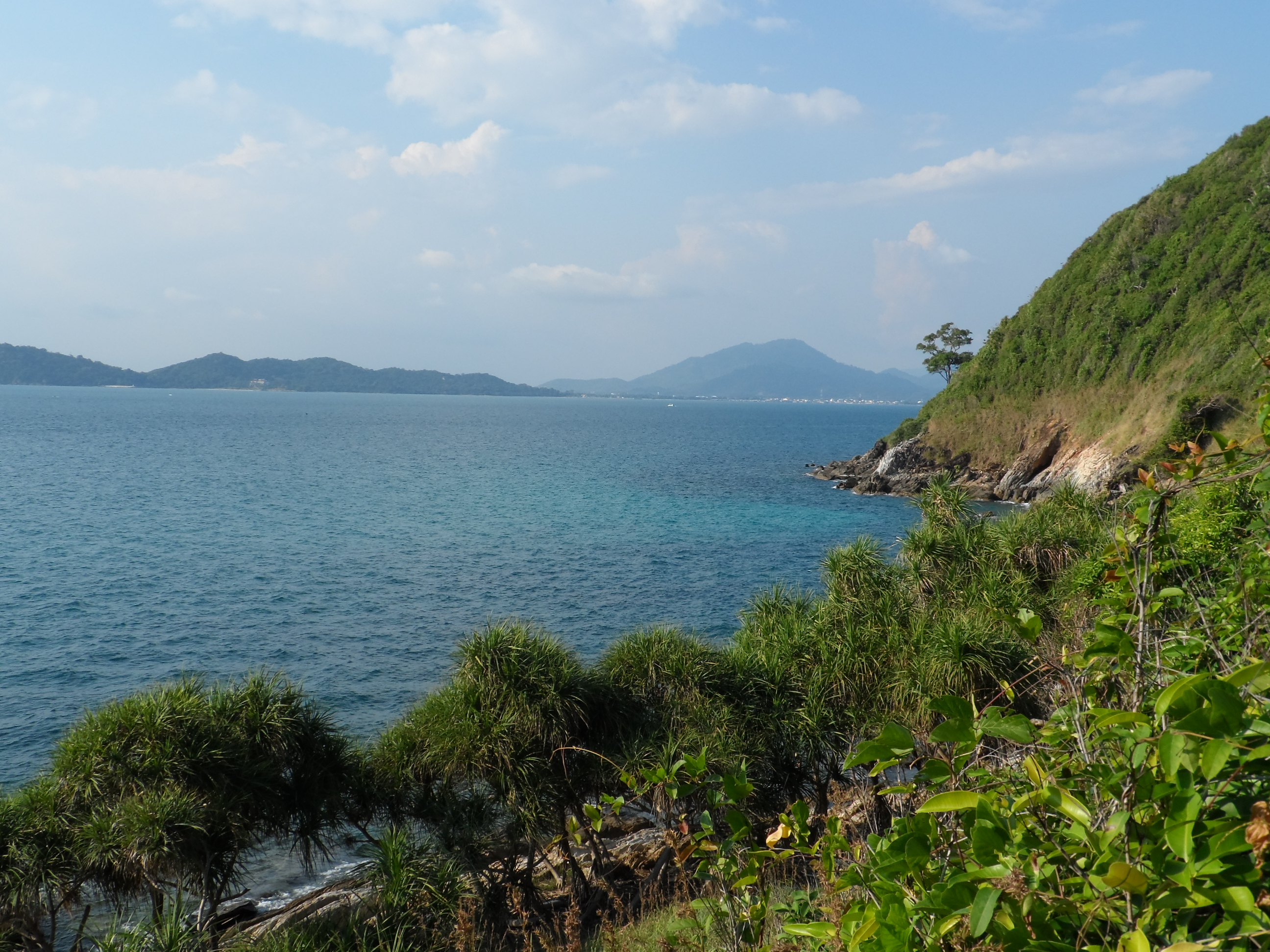
- West coast of Ko Samet
- Interactive map of Khao Laem Ya–Mu Ko Samet National Park
- Location: Rayong Province, Thailand
- Nearest city: Rayong
- Coordinates: 12°35′27″N 101°25′01″E
- Area: 131 km^{2} (51 sq mi)
- Established: 1981
- Visitors: 1,619,908 (in 2019)
- Governing body: Department of National Park, Wildlife and Plant Conservation (DNP)

Khao Laem Ya–Mu Ko Samet (Thai: เขาแหลมหญ้า-หมู่เกาะเสม็ด) is a Thai marine national park in the Gulf of Thailand off the coastline of Rayong, approximately 180 km southeast of Bangkok.

In 1981, the Royal Forest Department declared the archipelago of Ko Samet, along with nine other small islands, the headland of Khao Laem Ya, and the 11 kilometre Mae Rampeung Beach to be a national park, and thus these areas are under the jurisdiction of the national parks department. In August 2013 more than 500 national park officials were deployed to destroy three resorts—Muk Samet, Unseen, and Ploy Samet—which had been built illegally in the park.

== Geography ==
The park covers an area of 81,875 rai ~ 131 square kilometres (51 sq mi) of land and sea in Mueang Rayong District (Thai: เมืองระยอง), Rayong Province. The major and minor landmarks of the park are:

- Khao Plet (Plet Hill and valley)
- Khao Laem Ya (Leam Ya Hill and valley)
- Mae Ram Phung Beach and mountain

and the islands of:

- Ko Samet
- Ko Kudi (Monk's Chamber Island)
- Ko Kruai (Cone Island)
- Ko Makham (Tamarind Island, also called Ko Kham)
- Ko Plai Tin (Foot's Tip Island)
- Ko Chan (Moon Island)
- Ko Talu (Hole Island)
- Ko Klet Chalam (Shark Scale Island)
- Ko Thai Khang Kao (Bat's Bottom Island)

== Fauna ==
Fish in the waters around the islands include Parrot fish, blue damselfish and Cuttlefish are also found. Mammals include Crab-eating macaque, Lesser mouse-deer and flying foxes are also found here. The islands are home to the following seabirds Pacific reef heron, Black-naped tern, Bridled tern, Great crested tern and Roseate tern. Other birds in the park include Blue-winged pitta, Zebra dove, Coppersmith barbet and Asian barred owlet.

== Park corruption ==
In September 2016, the park chief and 79 other officials were removed from their posts for corruption. Investigations found that 200,000 baht per month was paid to park officials as kickbacks. The Department of National Parks (DNP) found that all businesses on Ko Samet "valued at over 100 million baht per month" were operated by "mafia groups", some linked to police officers. Since the removal of corrupt officials, revenues at the park have increased, rising to 4.8 million baht in October 2016, compared with 1.2 million baht in October 2015.

== Location ==
Khao Laem Ya-Mu Ko Samet National Park in overview PARO 2 (Si Racha)

3) Khao Laem Ya-Mu Ko Samet National Park in overview PARO 2 (Si Racha)

	National park
1	Khao Chamao-Khao Wong
2	Khao Khitchakut
3	Khao Laem Ya– Mu Ko Samet
4	Khao Sip Ha Chan
5	Namtok Khlong Kaeo
6	Mu Ko Chang
7	Namtok Phlio

	Wildlife sanctuary
8	Khao Ang Rue Nai
9	Khao Khiao– Khao Chomphu
10	Khao Soi Dao
11	Khlong Kruea Wai

	Non-hunting area
12	Bang Phra Reservoir
13	Khao Chi On
14	Khung Kraben
	Forest park
15	Khao Laem Sing
16	Namtok Khao Chao Bo Thong

== See also ==
- List of national parks of Thailand
- List of Protected Areas Regional Offices of Thailand
