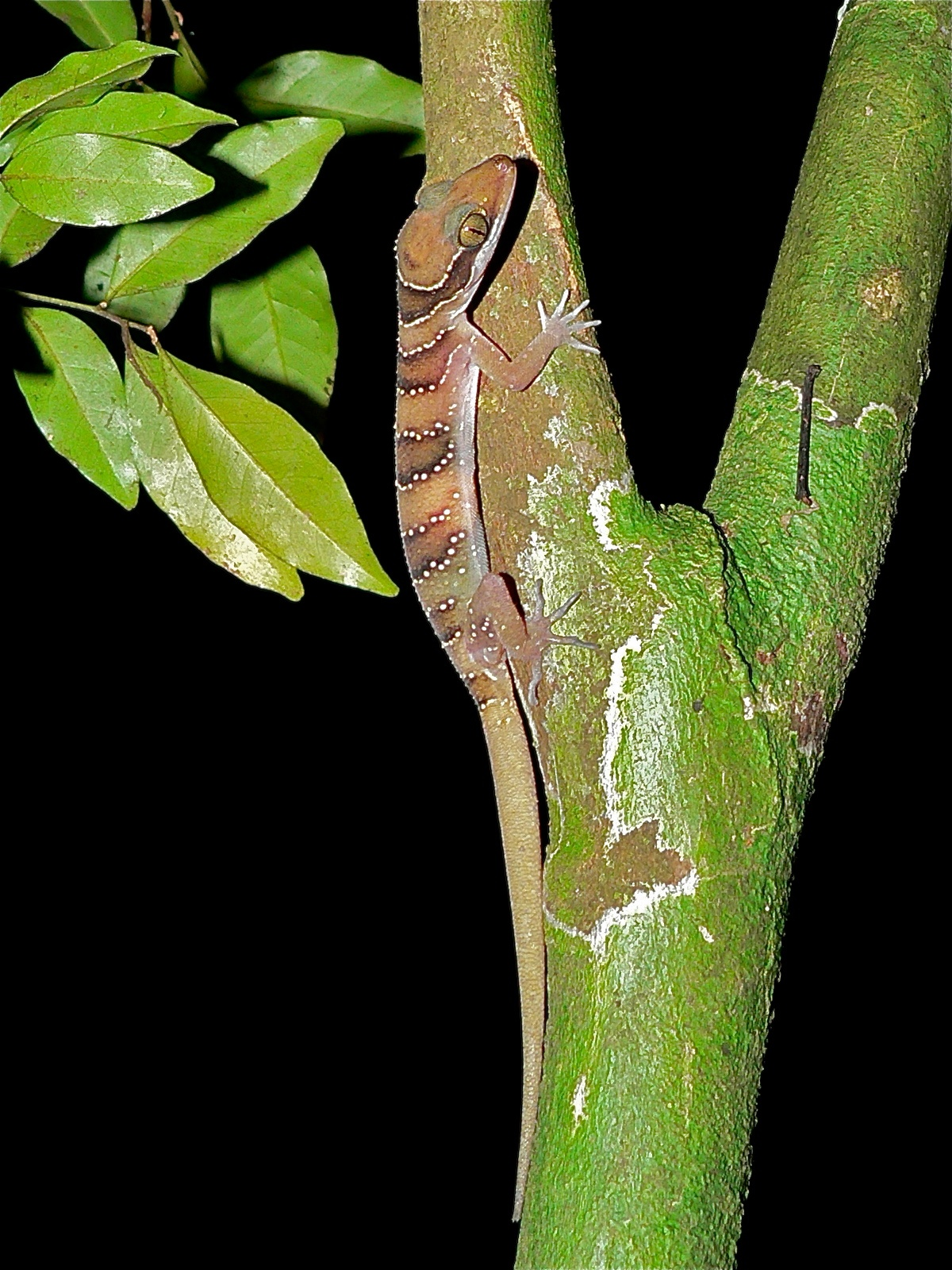

Conservation status
- Least Concern (IUCN 3.1)

Scientific classification
- Kingdom: Animalia
- Phylum: Chordata
- Class: Reptilia
- Order: Squamata
- Suborder: Gekkota
- Family: Gekkonidae
- Genus: Cyrtodactylus
- Species: C. intermedius

Binomial name
- Cyrtodactylus intermedius (M.A. Smith, 1917)

Synonyms
- Gymnodactylus intermedius M.A. Smith 1917; Cyrtodactylus intermedius Taylor 1963; Gymnodactylus (Cyrtodactylus) intermedius Wermuth 1965; Cyrtodactylus intermedius Cox et al. 1998: 86; Cyrtodactylus (Cyrtodactylus) intermedius Rösler 2000; Cyrtodactylus intermedius Sang et al. 2009

= Cyrtodactylus intermedius =

Species of lizard

Cyrtodactylus intermedius, also known as intermediate bow-fingered gecko or Cardamon forest gecko, is a species of gecko found in Cambodia, Vietnam, and Thailand, including several national parks (Khao Yai National Park, Khao Khitchakut National Park, Khao Soi Dao Wildlife Sanctuary and Mu Ko Chang National Park).
