= Khao Khiao =

Khao Khiao may refer to various places in Thailand:

- Khao Khiao Massif, Chonburi Province
  - Khao Khiao, Chonburi, a 789 m mountain in the Khao Khiao Massif
  - Khao Khiao – Khao Chomphu Wildlife Sanctuary
- Khao Rom, the highest point of the Sankamphaeng Range
- Khao Khiao, Nakhon Ratchasima, a 1292 m high mountain in Nakhon Ratchasima Province
