= Khao Chamao–Khao Wong National Park =

National park in Khao Chamao District, Thailand

- IUCN category II (national park)
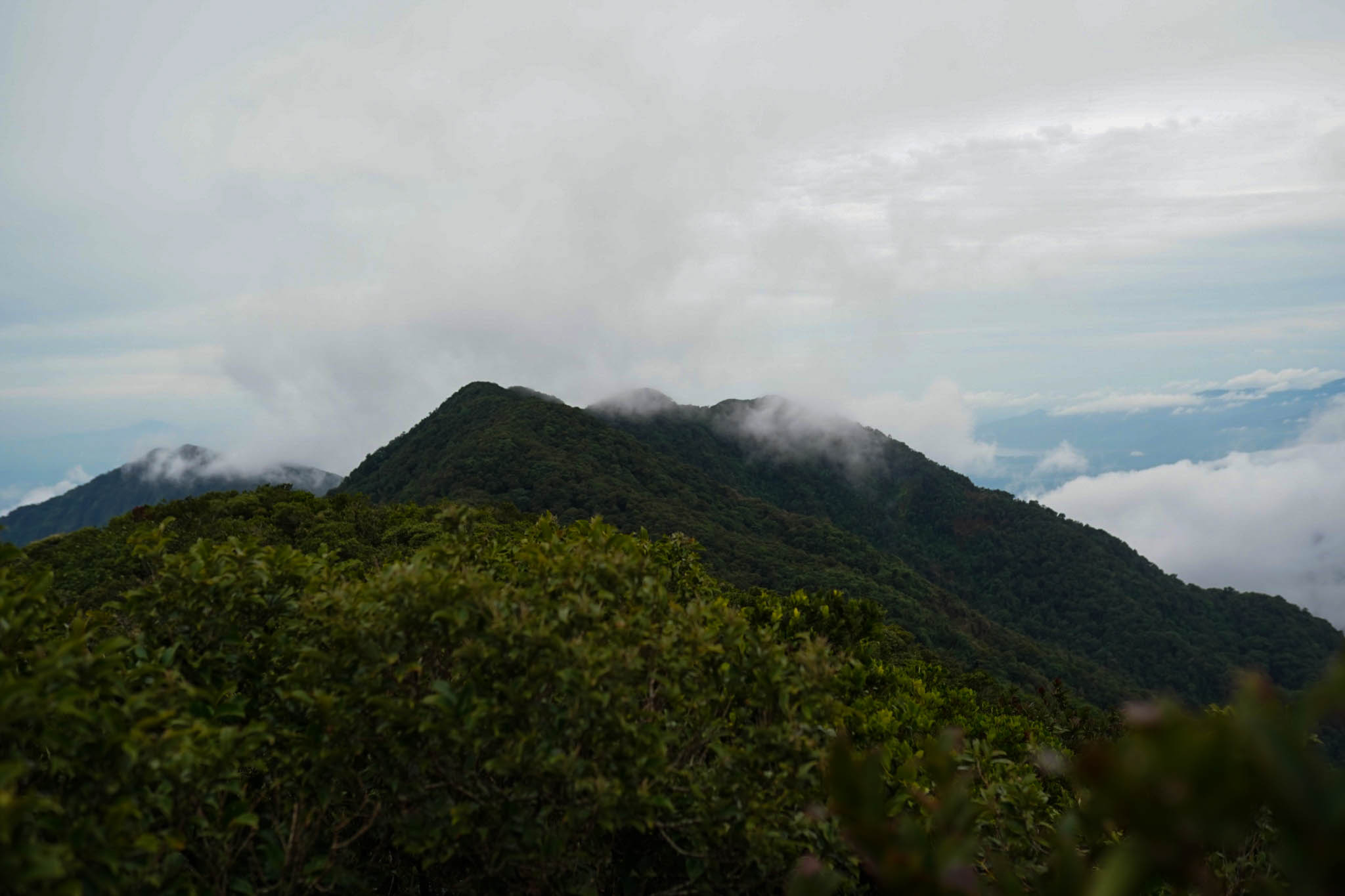
- Khao Chamao–Khao Wong National Park, view across the mountains
- Interactive map of Khao Chamao–Khao Wong National Park
- Location: Rayong Province, Thailand
- Nearest city: Rayong
- Coordinates: 12.95°N 101.74°E
- Area: 84 km^{2} (32 sq mi)
- Established: 1975
- Visitors: 218,430 (in 2019)
- Governing body: Department of National Park, Wildlife and Plant Conservation (DNP)

Khao Chamao - Khao Wong National Park, is a National Park in Khao Chamao District, Rayong Province in Thailand. The park covers an area of 52,300 rai ~ 84 square kilometres (32 sq mi) of forested mountains. North of the national park is the larger Khao Ang Rue Nai Wildlife Sanctuary.

== Geography ==
The Chamao-Wong Mountains forms a western outcrop of the much larger Cardamom Mountains, stretching east, well into Cambodia. Most of the mountain ridge is of moderate slope, reaching about 1,000 metres, but some hillside areas are quite steep. The most prominent peaks are Khao Chamao and Khao Wong, with Khao Chamao as the highest at about 1,024 meters above sea level.

== Climate ==
The weather of the National Park Khao chamao-Khao Wong is good. In the morning the weather is quite cold and is expected to be colder. During the day, the wind blows cold all day.

== Flora and fauna ==
Due to the close proximity to the much larger wildlife protection of Khao Ang Rue Nai Wildlife Sanctuary, the relatively small national park presents some larger and rare species that can only thrive in huge wilderness areas. This includes Asian elephant and Banteng. The park is also home to smaller mammals such as Barking deer, Sambar deer, Pileated gibbon and Crab-eating macaque.

A variety of birds are here too, including threatened and rare species. Of special note are Asian fairy-bluebird, Long-tailed broadbill, Great hornbill, Wreathed hornbill, Thick-billed pigeon, Mountain imperial pigeon, Blue pitta, Blue whistling thrush and Sulphur-breasted warbler.

Among reptiles, snakes such as King cobra, Reticulated python, Malayan pit viper and Malayan krait all lives here. Some of the gecko's living here, such as the Intermediate bent-toed gecko (Cyrtodactylus intermedius) or the Chanthaburi rock gecko (Cnemaspis chanthaburiensis), are endemic to this part of Southeast Asia. Along streams and pools, Green Water Dragons can sometimes be spotted. They are docile tree-living lizards, but are active during the day.

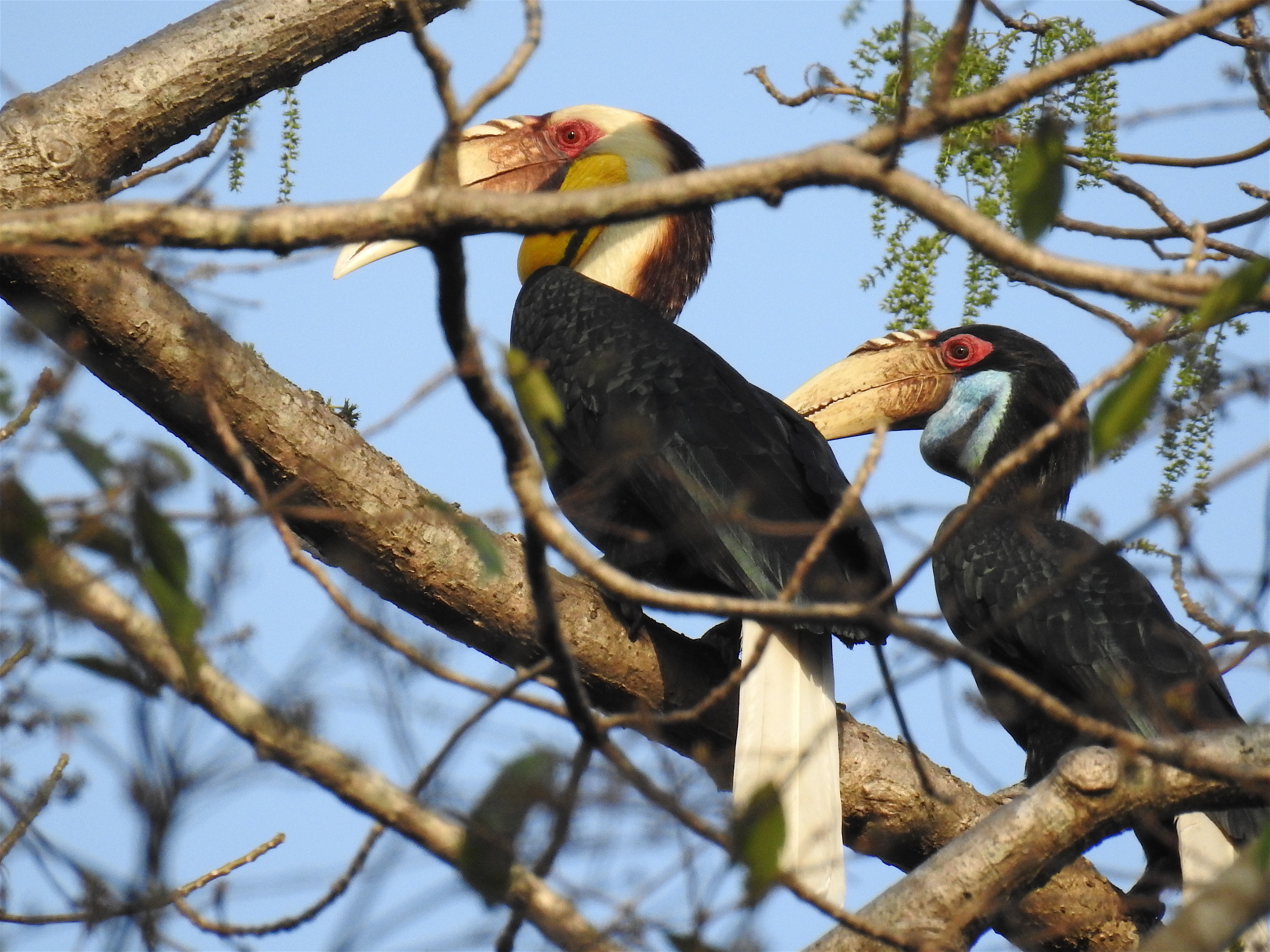
Wreathed hornbills. The national park is a good spot for birdwatching, with several rare or threatened species adapted to the special habitat here.

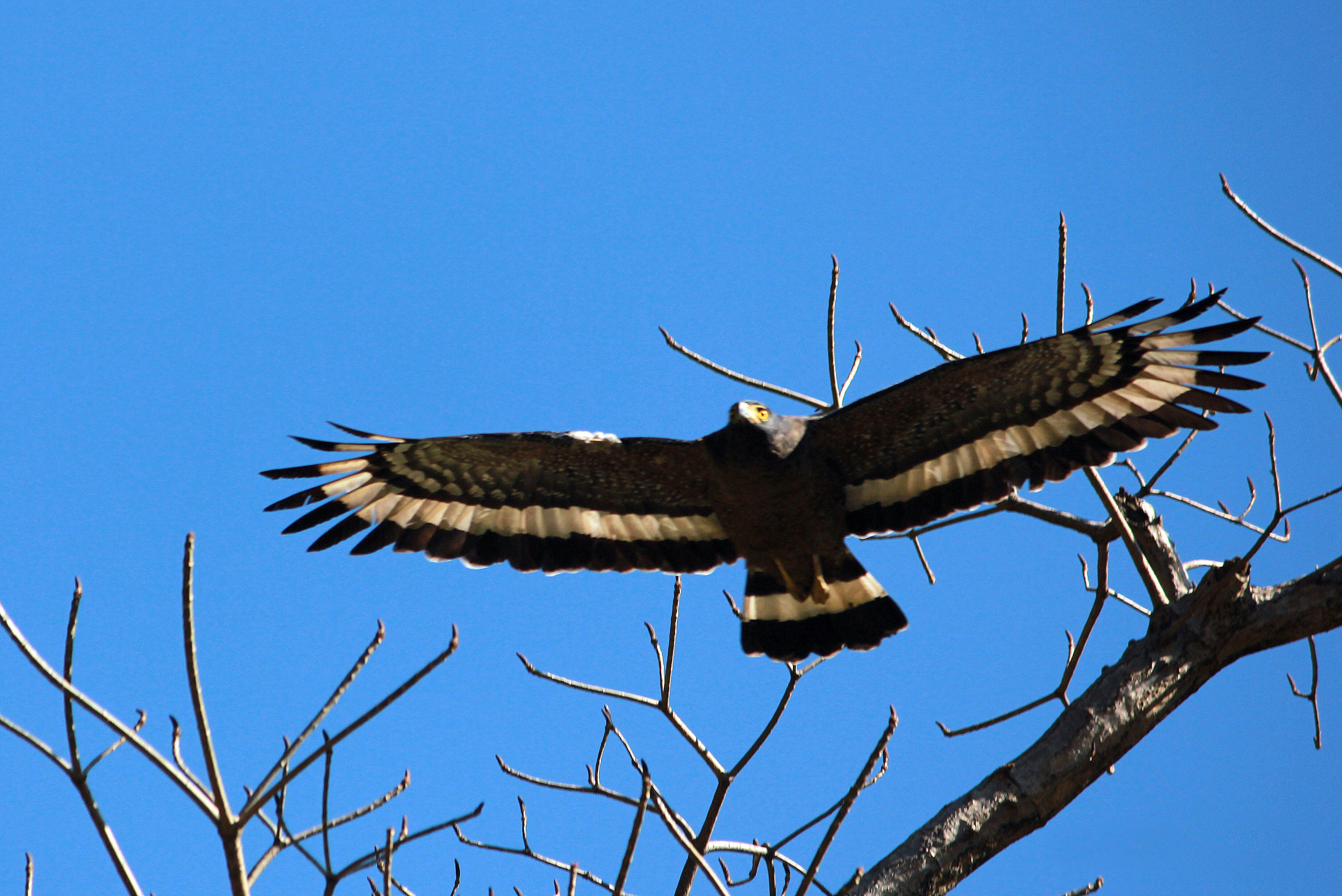
Crested Serpent Eagles can be spotted soaring above the forests, hunting for snakes and lizards

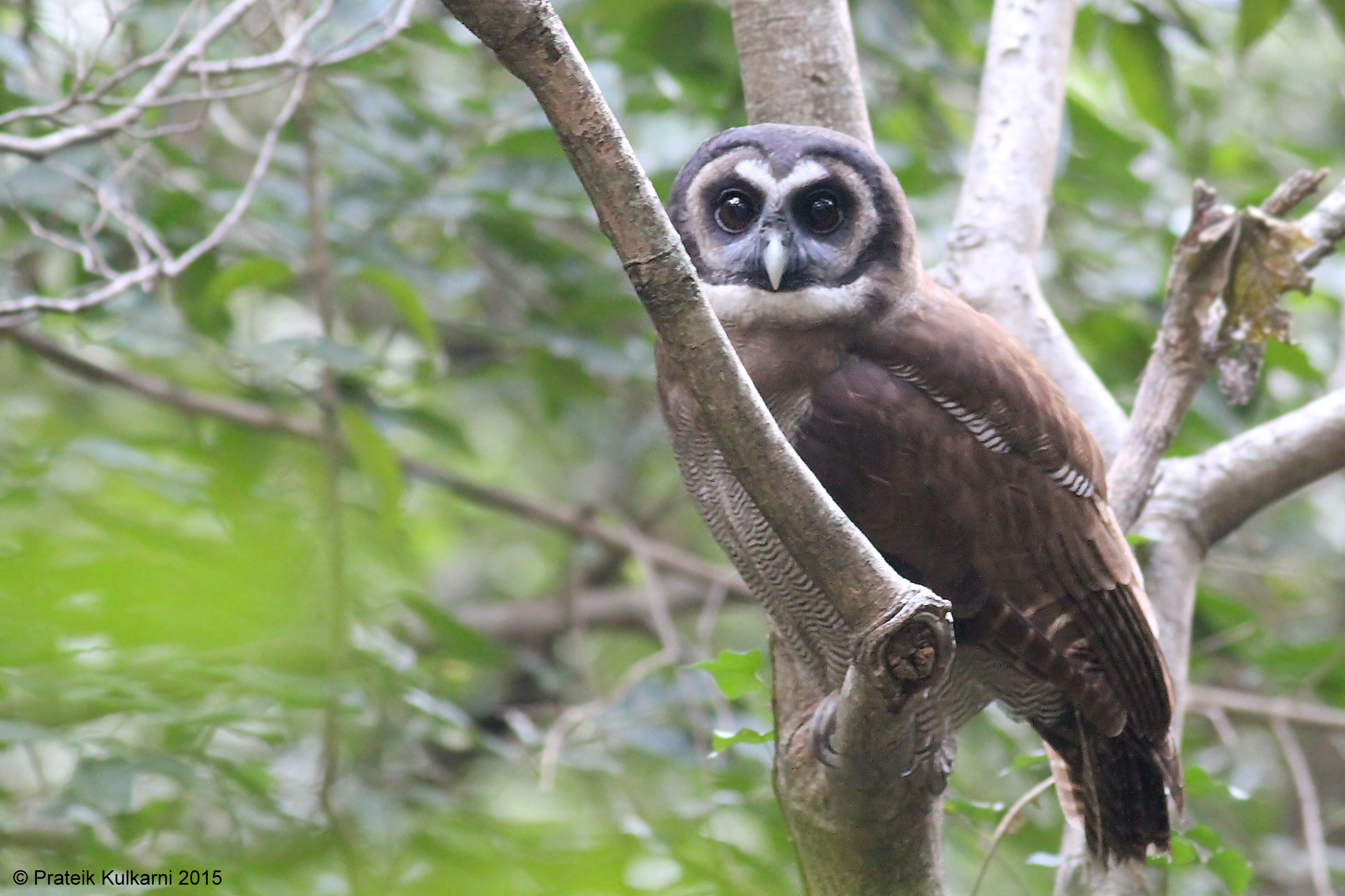
Brown Wood Owl. Like other owls, they are nocturnal creatures and rarely seen or heard during the day.

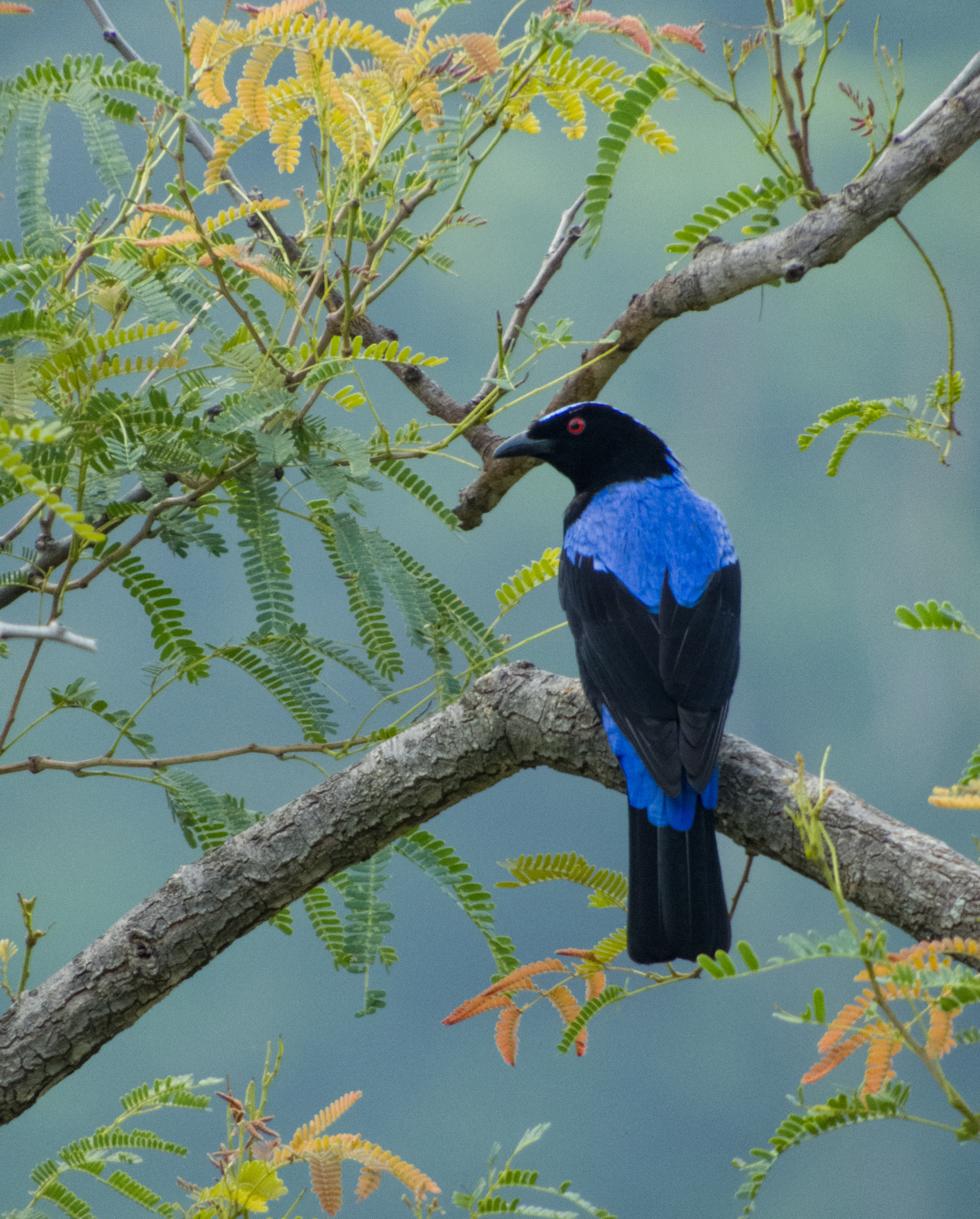
Asian fairy-bluebird (male)

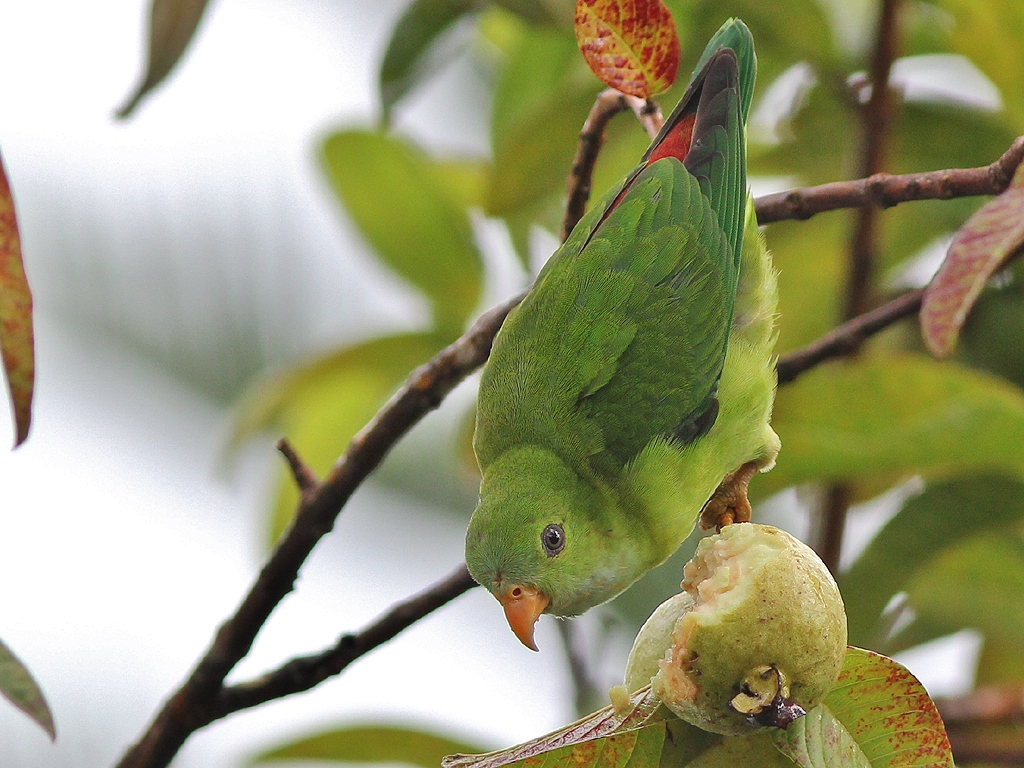
Vernal hanging parrot. Flocks of these small fruit-eating parrots are living here.

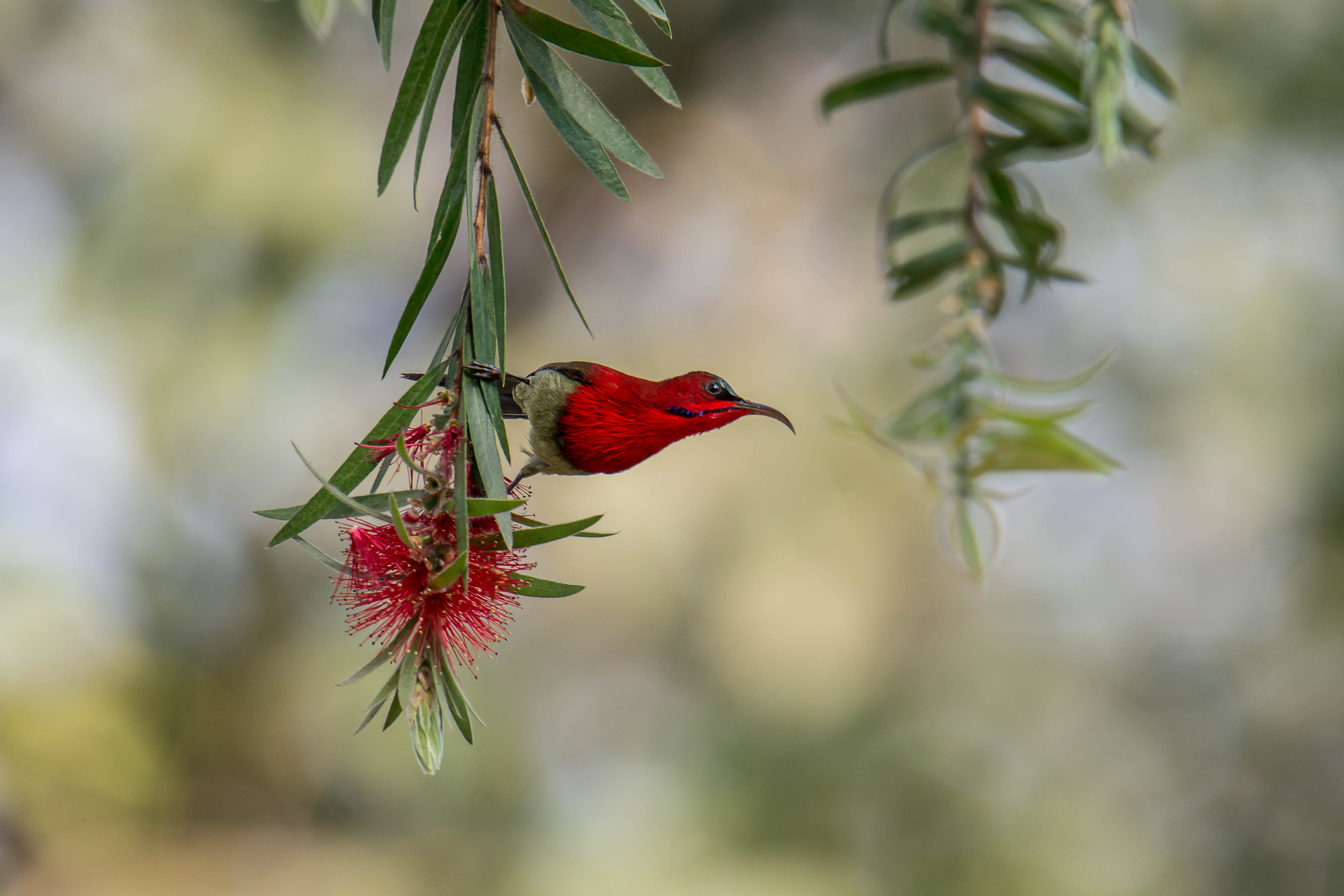
Crimson sunbird (male)
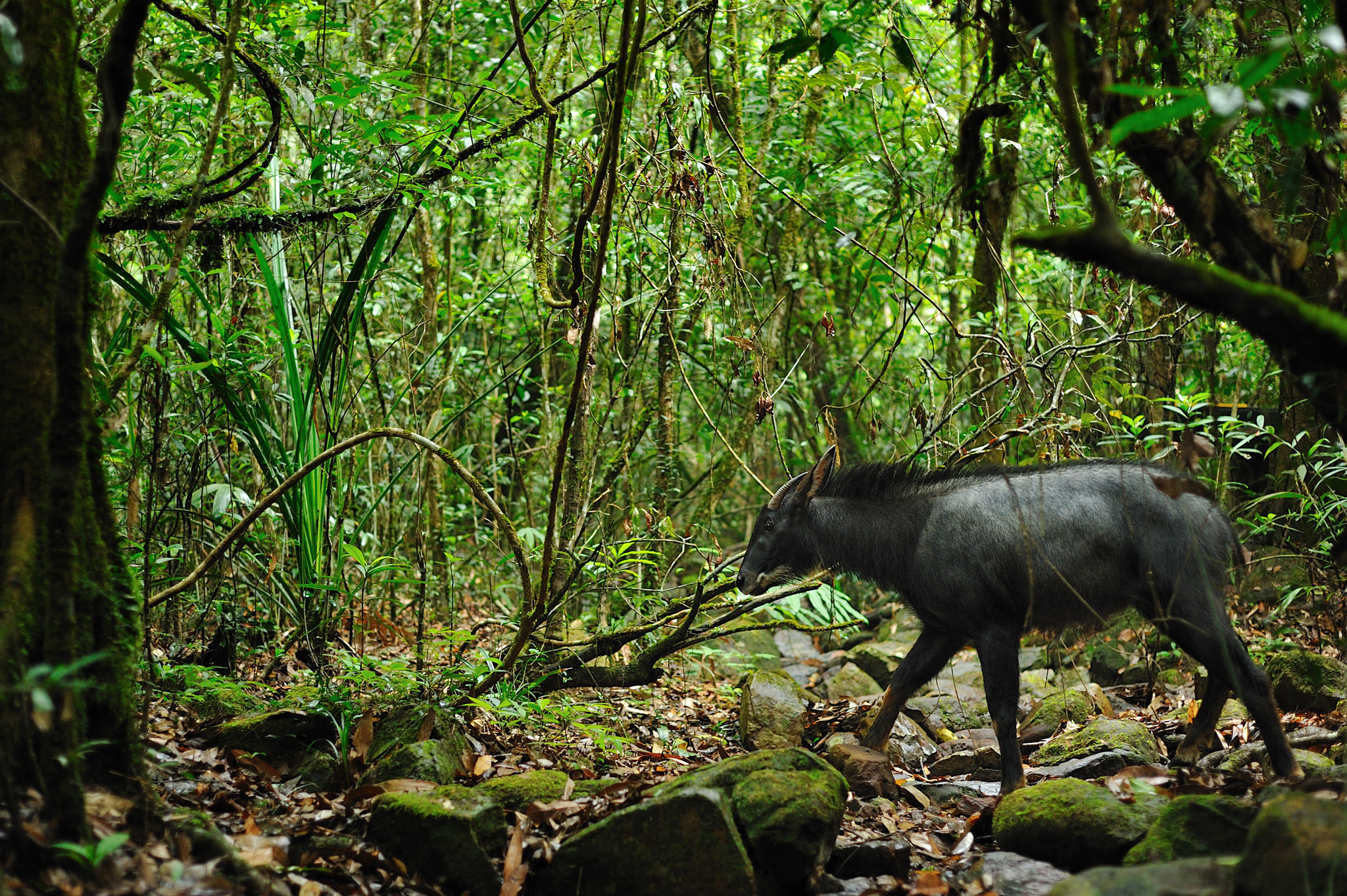
The goat-like Indochinese serow is here

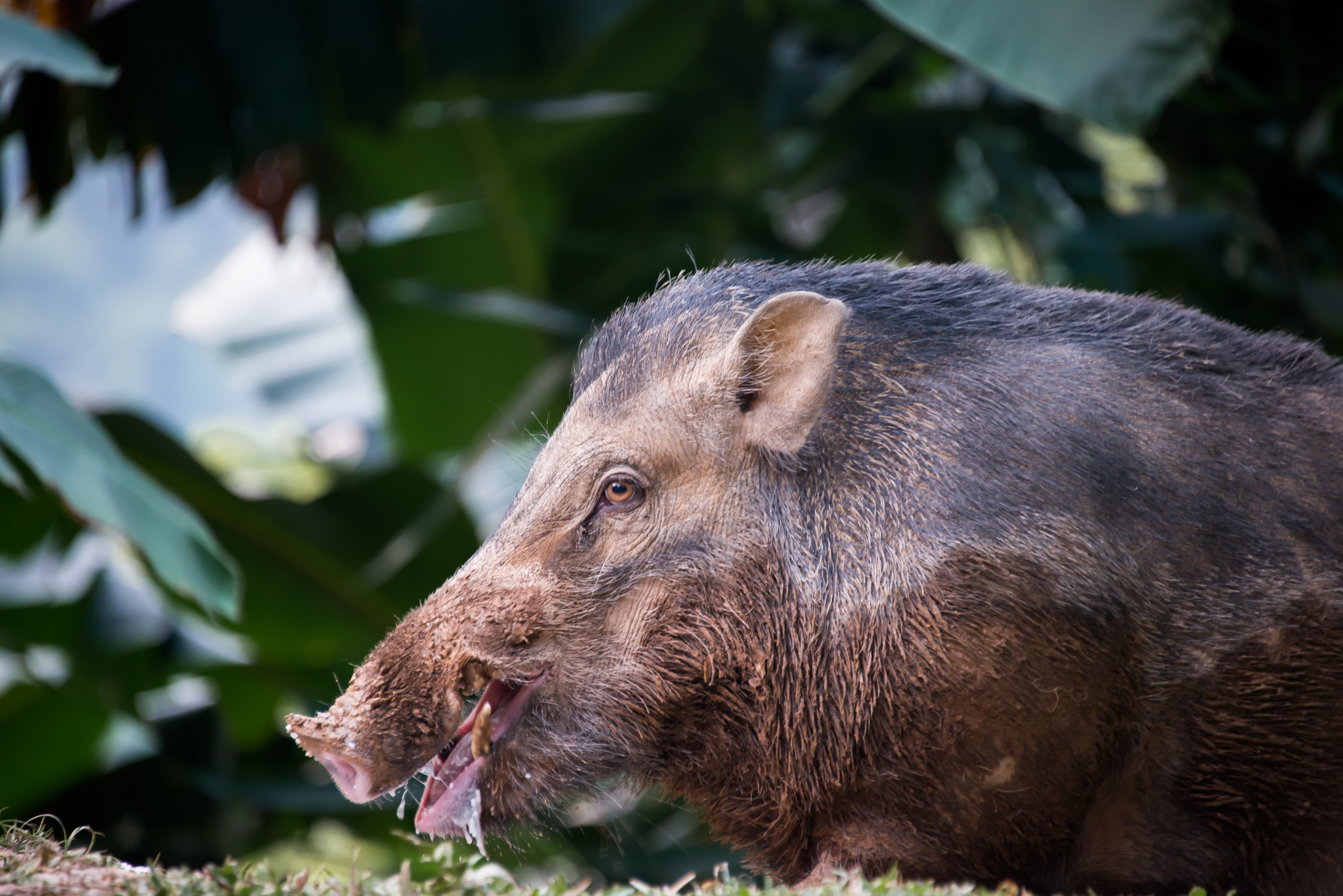
Wild boars. Like other wild animals they will avoid populated areas, but can be aggressive when encountered in their own territory.

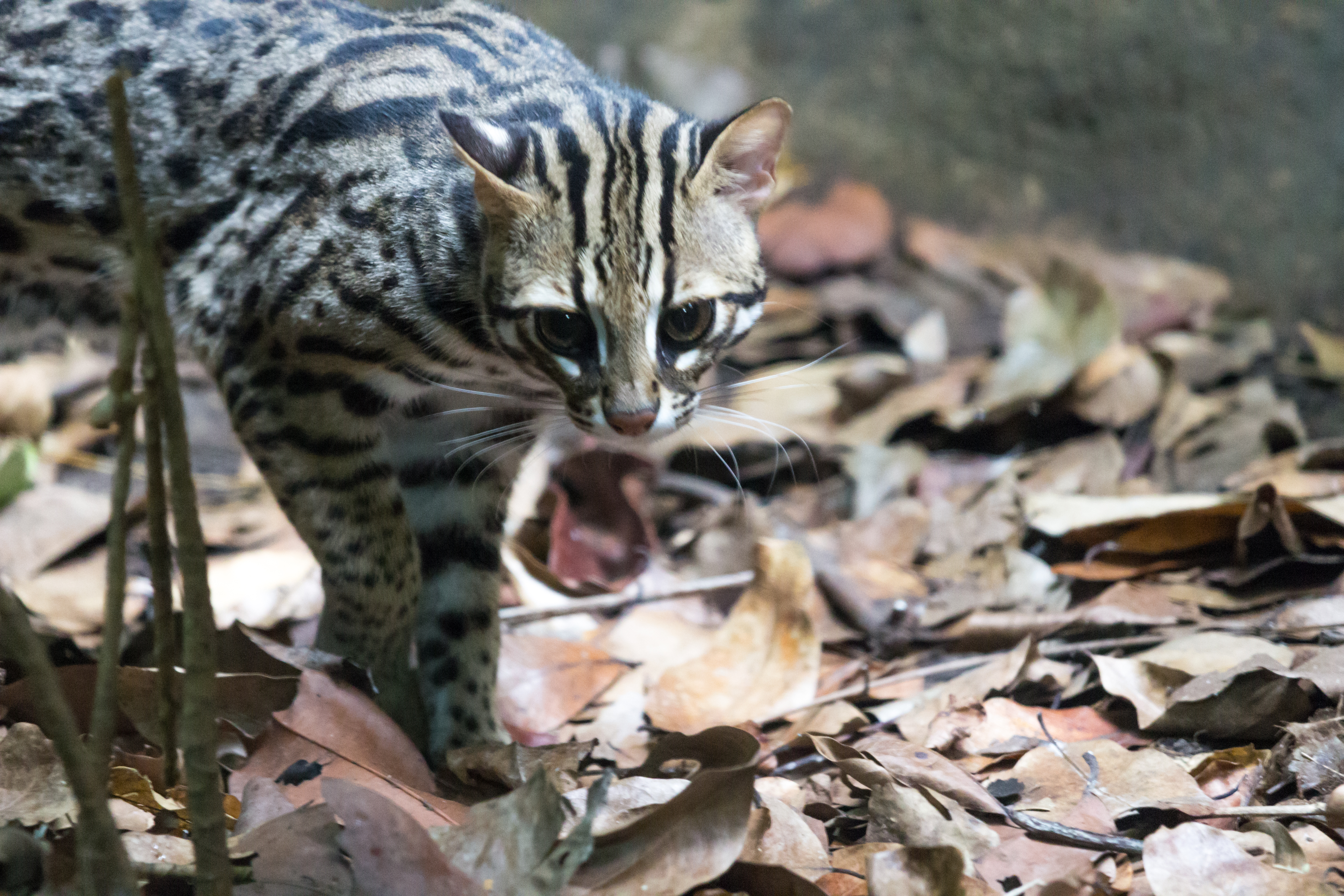
The small Leopard cat is here

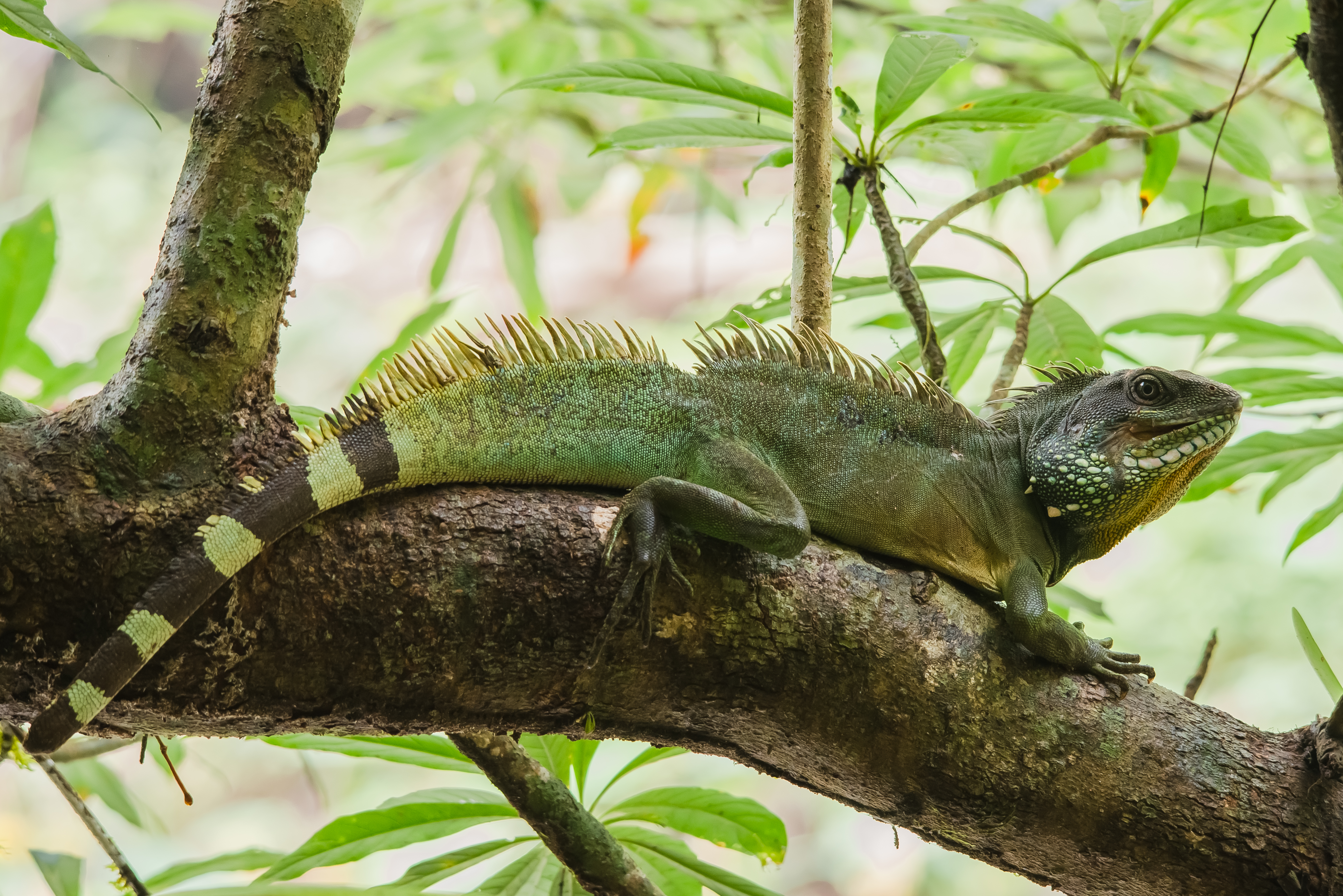
Green Water Dragon

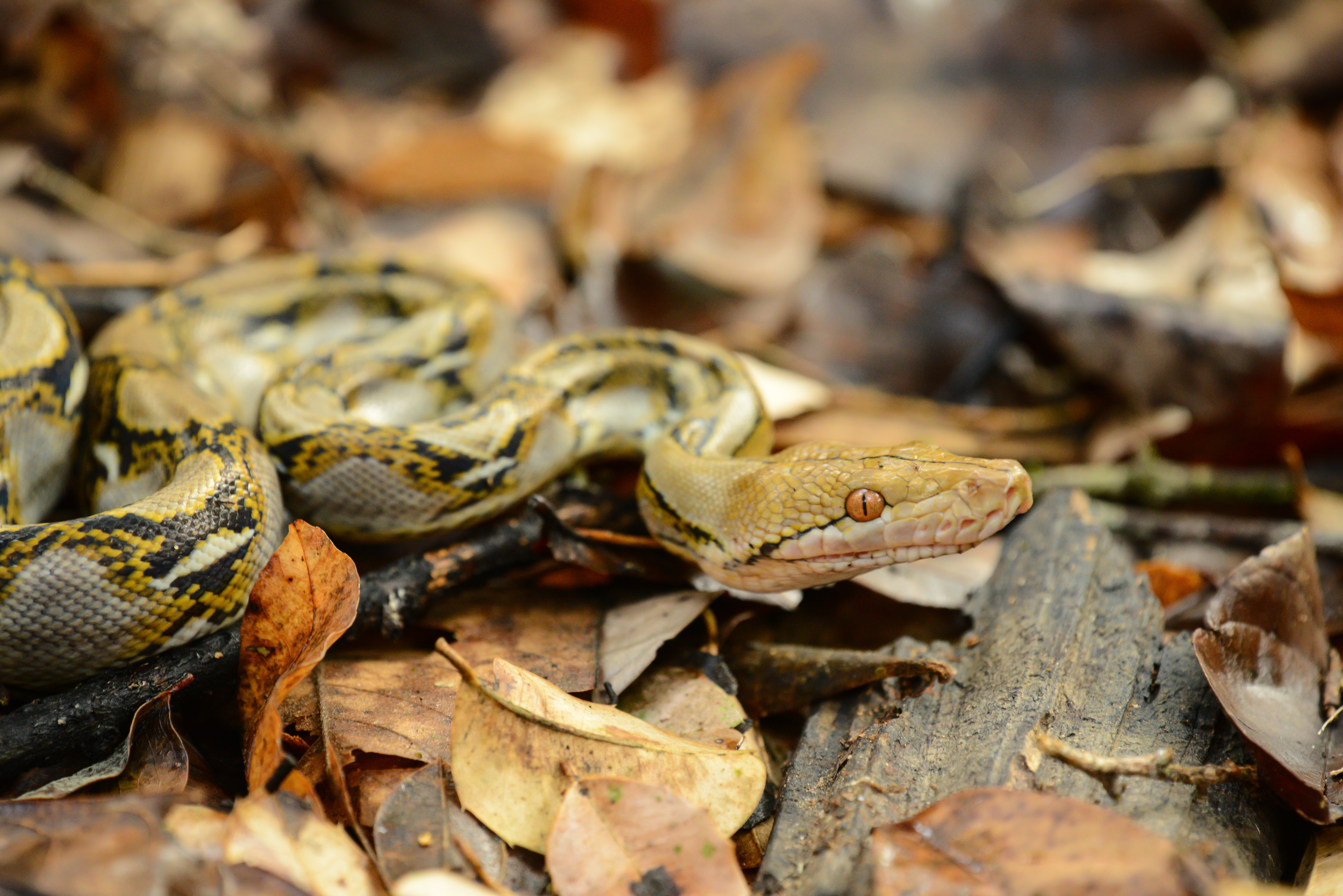
Reticulated python, the largest snake in Asia that can grow to more than 6 metres, is here

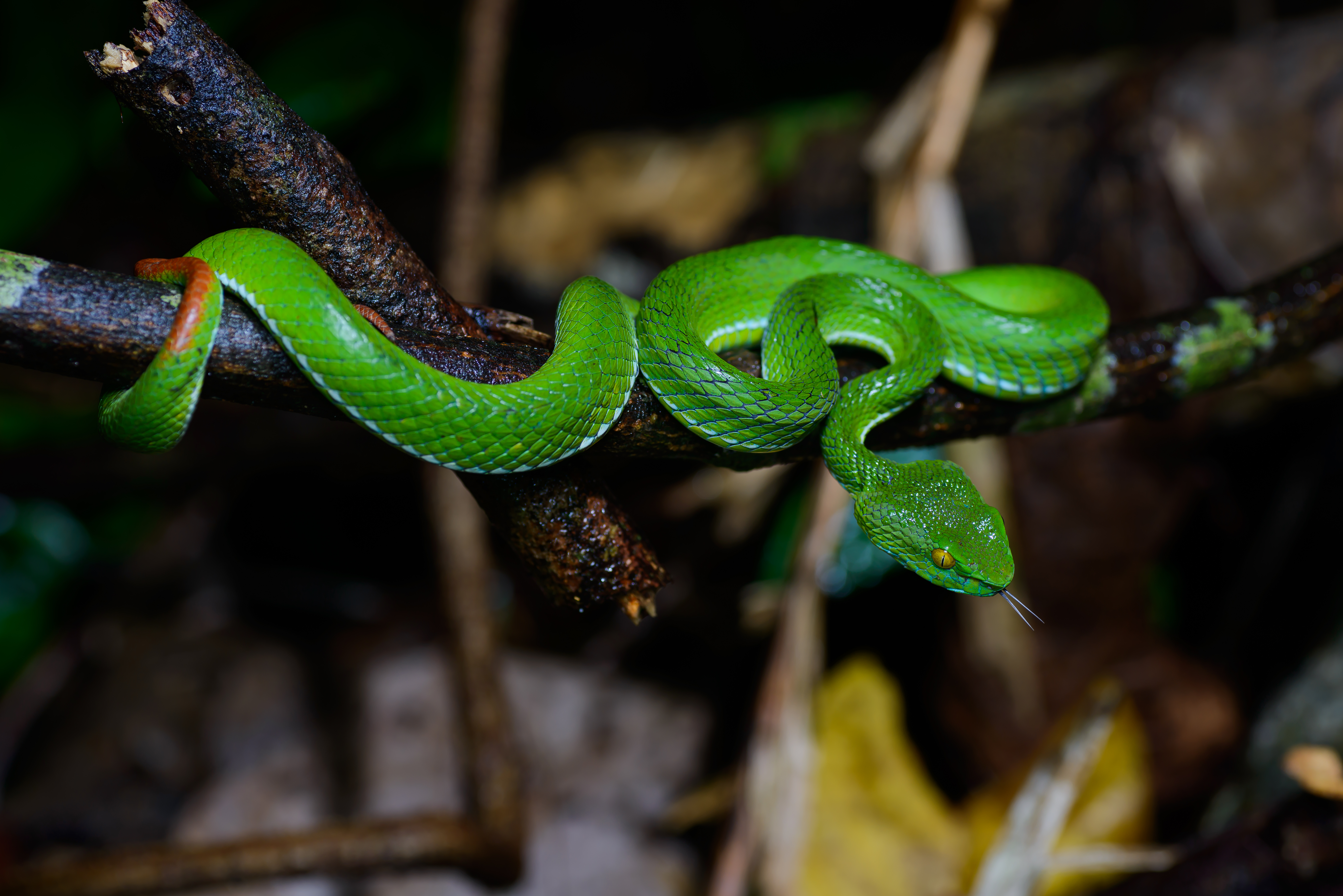
Cardamom pit viper (Trimeresurus cardamomensis) is endemic to this region

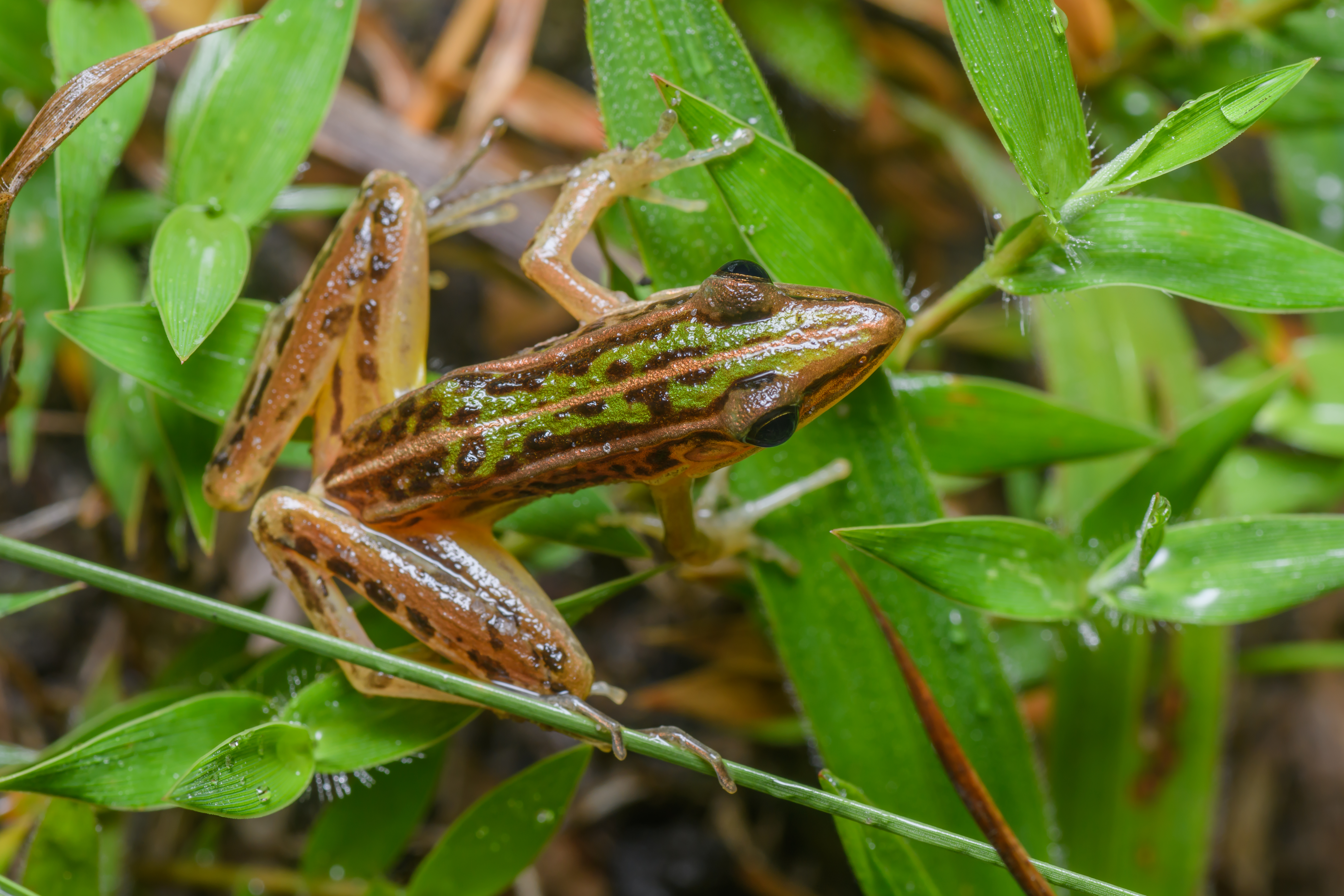
Three-striped grass frog. Amphibians dependent on wet habitats are living in the national park.

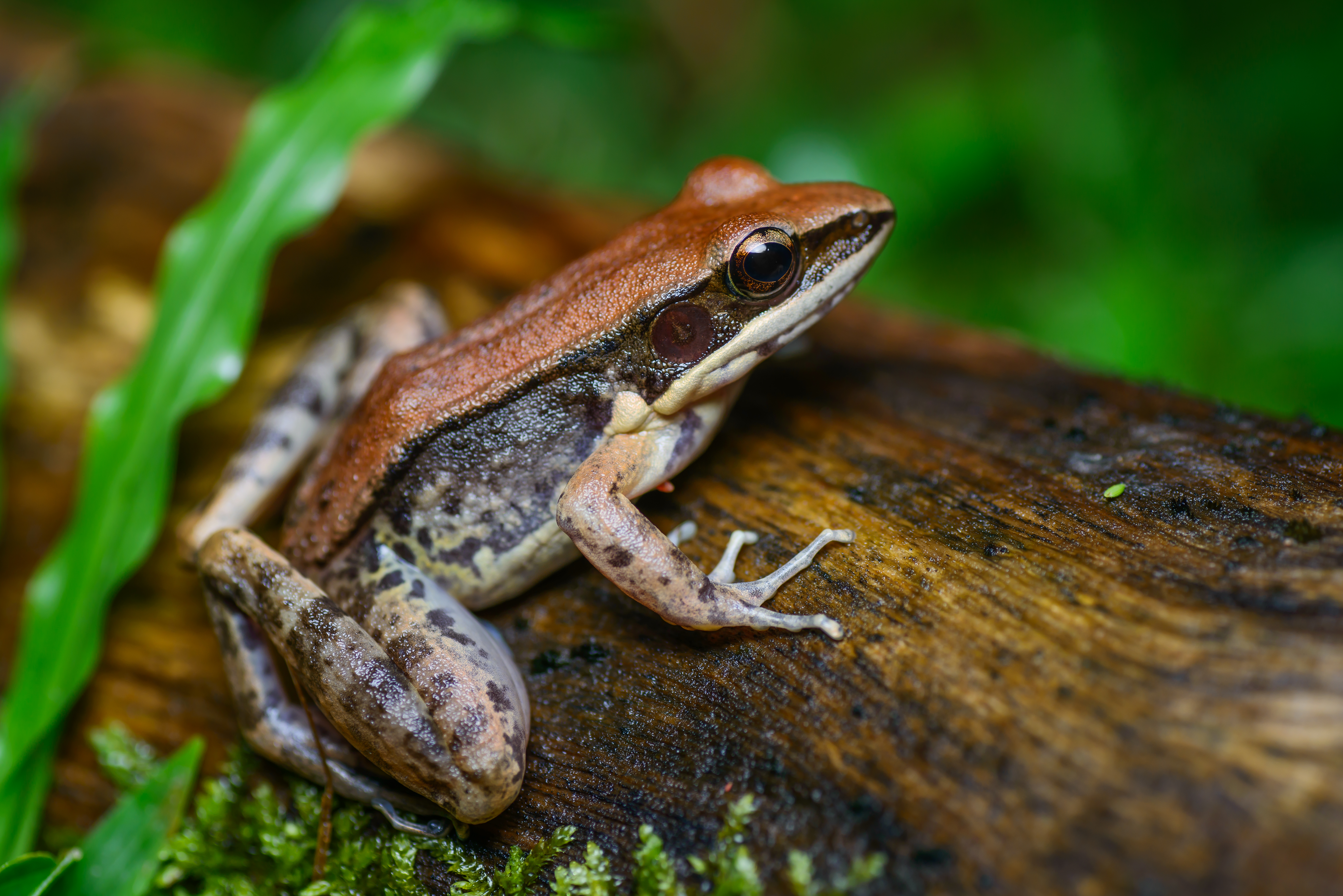
Mortensen's stream frog is only found in Thailand and Cambodia

== Waterfalls ==
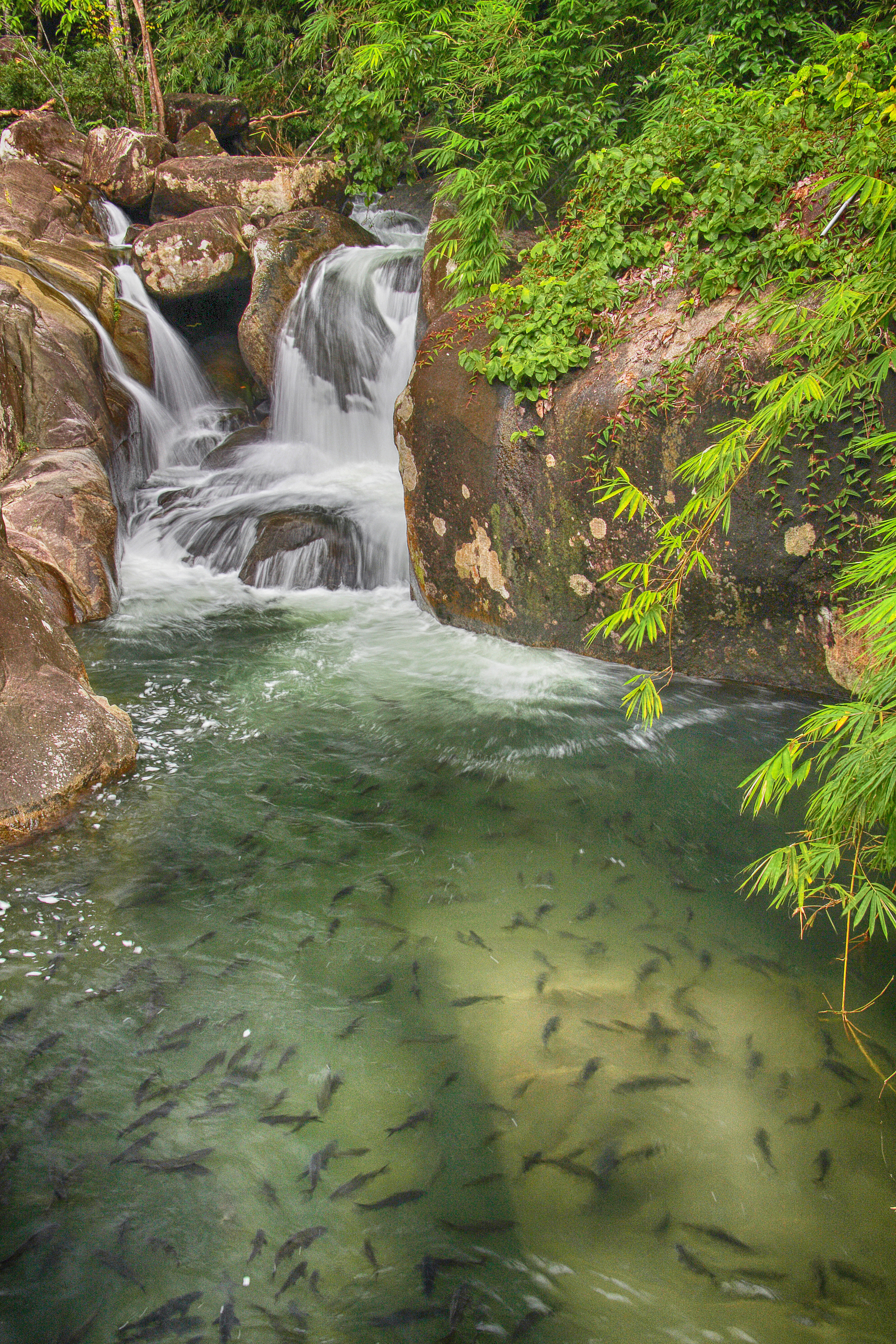
Khao Chamao waterfall

The mountains are known for its waterfalls, in particular the Khao Chamao waterfall originating from the peak of Chamao. This waterfall has 8 tiers with a downward flow of more than 3 kilometers. There is a path along the waterfall and it is possible to walk to the top and observe each tier, a hike that should take about two hours to complete. People always see the antimony fish in layer of waterfall.

Levels of waterfall:

1st level "Wang Nueng" (วังหนึ่ง)

2nd level "Wang Macha" (วังมัจฉา)

3rd level "Wang Morakot" (วังมรกต)

4th level "Wang Sai Ngam" (วังไทรงาม)

5th level "Pa Kluymai" (ผากล้วยไม้)

6th level "Chong-kab" (ช่องแคบ)

7th level "Hok-sai" (หกสาย)

8th level "High Cliff" (ผาสูง)

== Location ==
Khao Chamao-Khao Wong National Park in overview PARO 2 (Si Racha)

1) Khao Chamao-Khao Wong National Park in overview PARO 2 (Si Racha)

| | National park |
| 1 | Khao Chamao–Khao Wong |
| 2 | Khao Khitchakut |
| 3 | Khao Laem Ya–Mu Ko Samet |
| 4 | Khao Sip Ha Chan |
| 5 | Namtok Khlong Kaeo |
| 6 | Mu Ko Chang |
| 7 | Namtok Phlio |

| | Wildlife sanctuary |
| 8 | Khao Ang Rue Nai |
| 9 | Khao Khio– Khao Chomphu |
| 10 | Khao Soi Dao |
| 11 | Khlong Kruea Wai |

| | Non-hunting area |
| 12 | Bang Phra Reservoir |
| 13 | Khao Chi On |
| 14 | Khung Kraben |
| | Forest park |
| 15 | Khao Laem Sing |
| 16 | Namtok Khao Chao Bo Thong |

== See also ==
- List of national parks of Thailand
- List of Protected Areas Regional Offices of Thailand
