= Mu Ko Chang National Park =

National park of Thailand

- อุทยานแห่งชาติหมู่เกาะช้าง
- IUCN category II (national park)
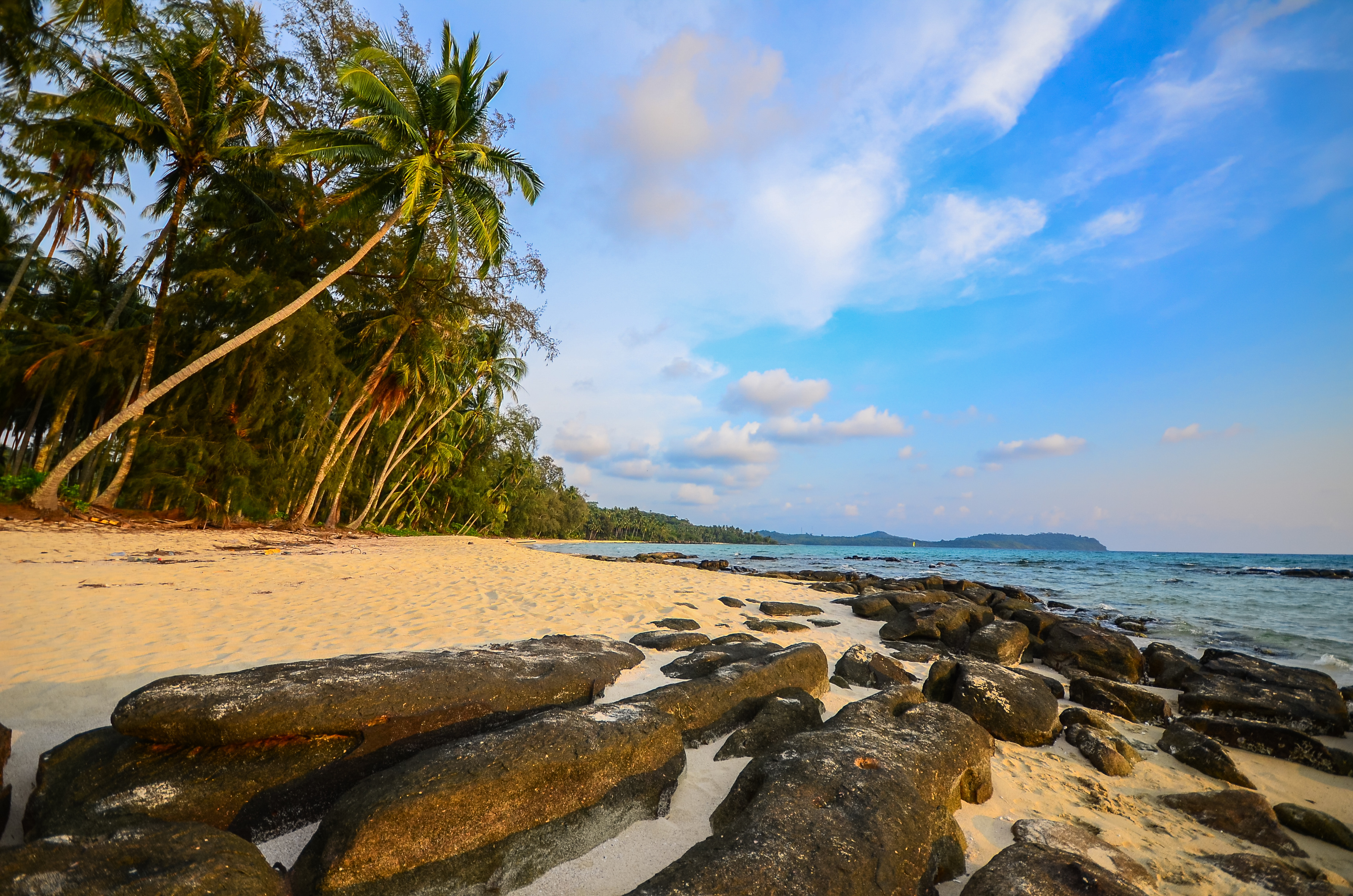
- Interactive map of Mu Ko Chang National Park
- Location: Ko Chang District, Trat Province, Thailand
- Nearest city: Trat
- Coordinates: 11°58′44″N 102°22′05″E
- Area: 650 km^{2} (250 sq mi)
- Established: 1982; 44 years ago
- Visitors: 249,895 (in 2019)
- Governing body: Department of National Park, Wildlife and Plant Conservation (DNP)

Mu Ko Chang National Park (Thai: อุทยานแห่งชาติหมู่เกาะช้าง) is in Trat Province, eastern Thailand. It spans several provincial districts. It is a marine national park with an area of 406,250 rai ~ 650 square kilometres (250 sq mi), including 52 islands. The most notable island within the archipelago is Ko Chang. Ko Chang covers an area of 213 square kilometres (82 sq mi) and is the major island in the Mu Ko Chang National Park, which became Thailand's 45th National Park in 1982. The park is an IUCN Category II protected area with coral reefs.

== Fauna ==
Jawed vertebrates present around the island include oceanic whitetip shark and whitetip reef shark. Among the reptile and amphibian species are king cobra, reticulated python, Common water monitor, Hawksbill sea turtle and soft-shelled turtle. Pink skunk clownfish is also around the island. Mammals on the island include barking deer, small Indian civet, squirrel and stump-tailed macaque. Bird population include Red-headed trogon, Tickell's blue flycatcher, Blue-winged pitta, Hooded pitta, Great hornbill, Wreathed hornbill, Oriental pied hornbill, Shikra, Green imperial pigeon and Heart-spotted woodpecker.

== Location ==
Mu Ko Chang National Park in overview PARO 2 (Si Racha)

6) Mu Ko Chang National Park in overview PARO 2 (Si Racha)

	National park
1	Khao Chamao–Khao Wong
2	Khao Khitchakut
3	Khao Laem Ya–Mu Ko Samet
4	Khao Sip Ha Chan
5	Namtok Khlong Kaeo
6	Mu Ko Chang
7	Namtok Phlio

	Wildlife sanctuary
8	Khao Ang Rue Nai
9	Khao Khio– Khao Chomphu
10	Khao Soi Dao
11	Khlong Kruea Wai

	Non-hunting area
12	Bang Phra Reservoir
13	Khao Chi On
14	Khung Kraben
	Forest park
15	Khao Laem Sing
16	Namtok Khao Chao Bo Thong

== See also ==
- List of national parks of Thailand
- List of Protected Areas Regional Offices of Thailand
