= Rutchada Suriyakul Na Ayutya =

Thai former civil servant

- รัชฎา สุริยกุล ณ อยุธยา

Director-General of the Department of National Parks, Wildlife and Plant Conservation
- In office 2020 – 28 December 2022
- Minister: Varawut Silpa-archa
- Succeeded by: Athapol Charoenshunsa

Rutchada Suriyakul Na Ayutya (Thai: รัชฎา สุริยกุล ณ อยุธยา; RTGS: Ratchada Suriyakun Na Ayutthaya) is a Thai former civil servant who served as director-general of the Department of National Parks, Wildlife and Plant Conservation until 2023.

== Corruption charges ==
On 27 December 2016, Rutchada was arrested at his office by Anti-Corruption Division (ACD) police on bribery and malfeasance charges. Approximately 5 million Baht was found in his offices in envelopes. Following the arrest, Jatuporn Buruspat, Permanent Secretary of Thailand's Ministry of Natural Resources and Environment, ordered an internal investigation into Rutchada.

On 28 December 2016, Rutchada was moved to a new position under Section 11 of the State Administration Act, to assist with work at the Office of the Prime Minister. The move was made to facilitate the corruption probe and remove his oversight from the department.

On 23 January 2023, the corruption probe of Rutchada concluded with the results handed over to the National Anti-Corruption Commission (NACC).

He was succeeded by Athapol Charoenshunsa on 25 January 2023.

On 3 February 2023, Rutchada was formally dismissed from his position within the ministry.
