= Ocellularia neoleucina =

Scientific classification
- Domain: Eukaryota
- Kingdom: Fungi
- Division: Ascomycota
- Class: Lecanoromycetes
- Order: Graphidales
- Family: Graphidaceae
- Genus: Ocellularia
- Species: O. neoleucina

Binomial name
- Ocellularia neoleucina Homchant. & Coppins (2002)

Species of lichen

Ocellularia neoleucina is a species of corticolous (bark-dwelling) lichen in the family Graphidaceae. Found in southeastern Thailand, it was formally described as a new species in 2002 by lichenologists Natsurang Homchantara and Brian J. Coppins. The type specimen was collected from Namtok Phlio National Park (Chanthaburi Province); here, in a moist, lowland evergreen forest, it was found growing on Anisoptera costata. The lichen has a shiny, smooth, greenish thallus with a dense cortex and a white medulla with many crystals. Its ascospores are ellipsoid, thin walled, colourless, and typically measure 14.0–17.0 by 5.0–6.7 μm. It contains stictic acid, a secondary compound.
