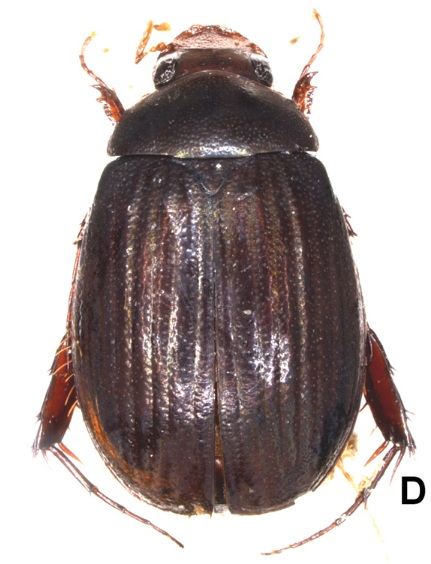

Scientific classification
- Kingdom: Animalia
- Phylum: Arthropoda
- Clade: Pancrustacea
- Class: Insecta
- Order: Coleoptera
- Suborder: Polyphaga
- Infraorder: Scarabaeiformia
- Family: Scarabaeidae
- Genus: Tetraserica
- Species: T. khaosoidaoensis

Binomial name
- Tetraserica khaosoidaoensis Fabrizi, Dalstein & Ahrens, 2019

= Tetraserica khaosoidaoensis =

Species of beetle

Tetraserica khaosoidaoensis is a species of beetle of the family Scarabaeidae. It is found in Thailand.

== Description ==
Adults reach a length of about 7.4–7.8 mm. The surface of the labroclypeus and the disc of the frons are glabrous. The smooth area anterior to the eye is twice as wide as long.

== Etymology ==
The species is named after the type locality, Khao Soi Dao.
