= Namtok Phlio National Park =

Protected area in Chanthaburi Province, Thailand

- อุทยานแห่งชาติน้ำตกพลิ้ว
- IUCN category II (national park)
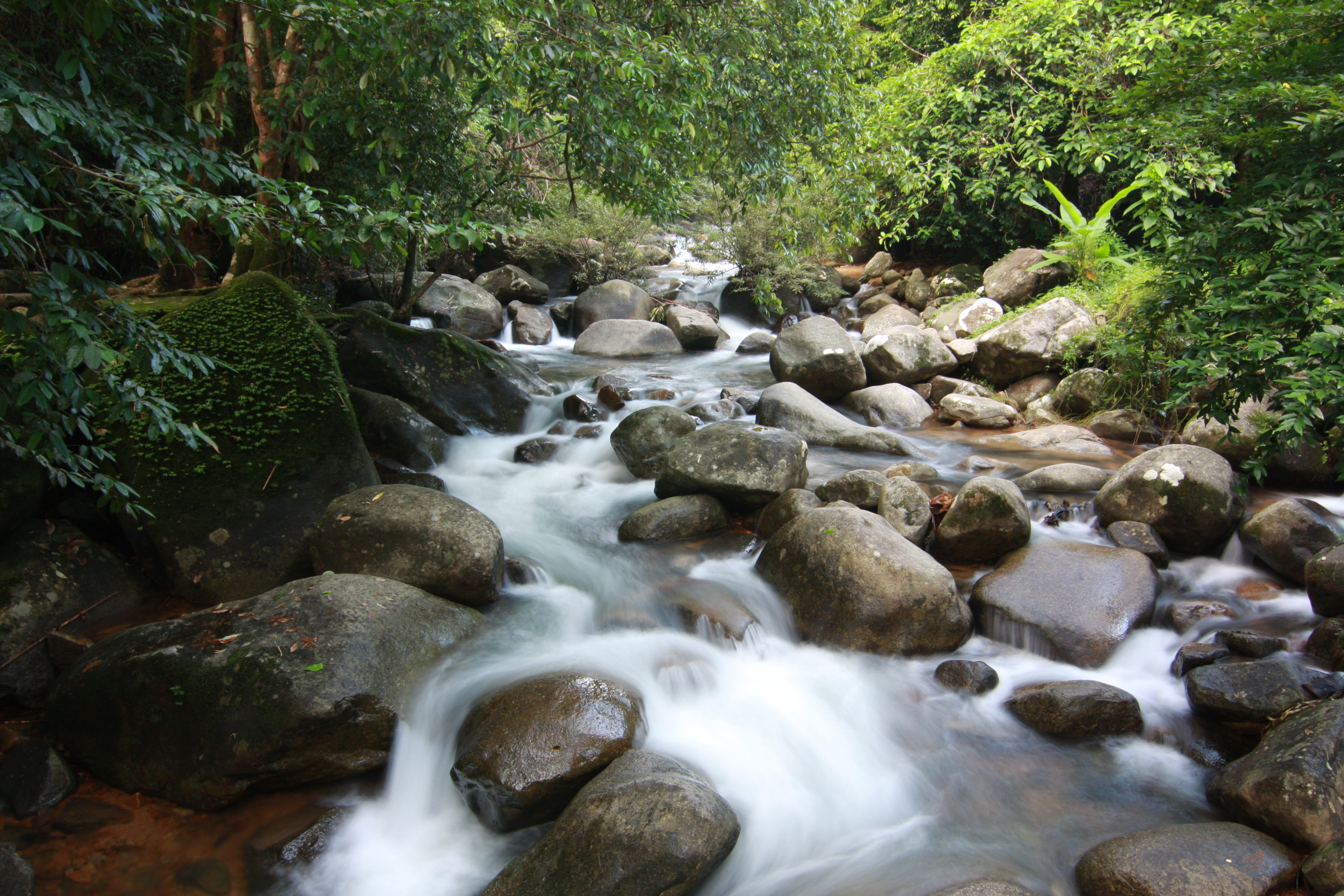
- Phlio Waterfall
- Interactive map of Namtok Phlio National Park
- Location: Chanthaburi Province, Thailand
- Nearest city: Chanthaburi
- Coordinates: 12°31′31″N 102°10′37″E
- Area: 135 km^{2} (52 sq mi)
- Established: May 1975
- Visitors: 671,396 (in 2019)
- Governing body: Department of National Park, Wildlife and Plant Conservation (DNP)

Namtok Phlio National Park (Thai: อุทยานแห่งชาติน้ำตกพลิ้ว) is a national park in Chanthaburi Province, Thailand. The park is home to forested mountains, waterfalls, and many stupas and chedis from the reign of King Rama V. The mountains here are also known as Khao Sa Bap, a mountainous fragment of the western ends of the much larger Cardamom Mountains. The Sa Bap mountains are heavily eroded karst, rising to no more than 673 metres.

== Geography ==
Namtok Phlio National Park is located 14 kilometres (9 mi) south of Chanthaburi town in Mueang, Laem Sing, Khlung and Makham districts. The park's area is 84,062 rai ~ 135 square kilometres (52 sq mi). The highest point is Map Wa Krok peak at 925 metres (3,035 ft).

== History ==
During the reign of King Rama V, the Along Khon chedi was built in 1876. In 1881 a memorial stupa, housing a relic of Princess Sunanta Kumari, was commissioned by King Rama V.

On 2 May 1975, the area was declared a national park as Khao Sa Bap National Park. On 29 September 1982, the park was renamed Namtok Phlio National Park.

== Attractions ==
The park's main attraction is its namesake waterfall, Phlio, whose pools are home to large numbers of soro brook carp. The King Rama V era chedi and stupa are located near Phlio waterfall. Other park waterfalls include Khlong Narai, Makok and Trok Nong.

== Flora and fauna ==
Namtok Phlio is covered in tropical rainforest, including such species as Aquilaria crassna, Shorea henryana, Hopea ferrea, Dipterocarpus turbinatus, Pterocymbium tinctorium, Garcinia celebica and Garcinia cowa.

Animal species include Sunda pangolin, lar gibbon, pig-tailed macaque, northern red muntjac, common palm civet, serow, chevrotain and wild boar.

The park is host to abundant bird species including heron, brahminy kite, shikra, crested serpent eagle, besra, imperial pigeon, red turtle dove, emerald dove, hornbill, barbet, vernal hanging parrot, shrike, woodpecker, drongo, hill myna, bulbul and white-rumped shama.

== Location ==
Namtok Phlio National Park in overview PARO 2 (Si Racha)

7) Namtok Phlio National Park in overview PARO 2 (Si Racha)

	National park
1	Khao Chamao–Khao Wong
2	Khao Khitchakut
3	Khao Laem Ya–Mu Ko Samet
4	Khao Sip Ha Chan
5	Namtok Khlong Kaeo
6	Mu Ko Chang
7	Namtok Phlio

	Wildlife sanctuary
8	Khao Ang Rue Nai
9	Khao Khio– Khao Chomphu
10	Khao Soi Dao
11	Khlong Kruea Wai

	Non-hunting area
12	Bang Phra Reservoir
13	Khao Chi On
14	Khung Kraben
	Forest park
15	Khao Laem Sing
16	Namtok Khao Chao Bo Thong

== See also ==
- List of national parks of Thailand
- List of Protected Areas Regional Offices of Thailand
