= Khao Soi Dao Wildlife Sanctuary =

Protected area in Thailand

- เขตรักษาพันธุ์สัตว์ป่าเขาสอยดาว
- IUCN category Ia (strict nature reserve)
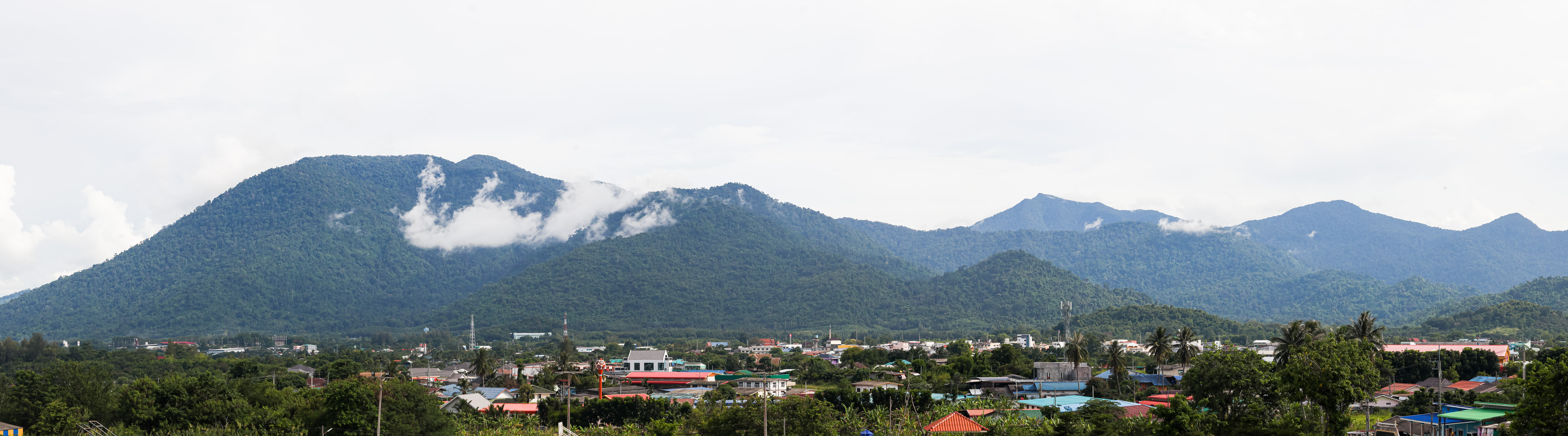
- Khao Soi Dao Wildlife Sanctuary viewed from Soi Dao District Office

- Location within Thailand
- Location: Thailand
- Nearest city: Chanthaburi • Soi Dao district • Pong Nam Ron district
- Coordinates: 13.034232°N 102.172713°E
- Area: 744.96 km^{2} (287.63 sq mi)
- Established: 4 September 1972
- Governing body: Wildlife Conservation Office, Department of National Parks, Wildlife and Plant Conservation

Khao Soi Dao Wildlife Sanctuary (Thai: เขตรักษาพันธุ์สัตว์ป่าเขาสอยดาว) is a wildlife sanctuary in Thailand's Chanthaburi province. It covers the area around Khao Soi Dao Tai and Khao Soi Dao Nuea (south and north Soi Dao mountains), the two highest peaks in the Chanthaburi Mountains of Eastern Thailand, which form part of the much larger Cardamom Mountains extending well into Cambodia.

The mountains are covered in tropical rainforest and the Chanthaburi River originates from the Khao Soi Dao Tai mountain. The wildlife sanctuary neighbours the smaller Khao Khitchakut National Park to the south and Khao Sip Ha Chan National Park and Khao Ang Rue Nai Wildlife Sanctuary to the northwest.

== History ==
Khao Soi Dao Wildlife Sanctuary was established in 1972 and covers 744.96 square kilometres (287.63 sq mi), most of which is mountainous terrain. In 2007, the sanctuary was also designated as an Important Bird Area (IBA), thus of global importance for bird conservation.

== Fauna ==
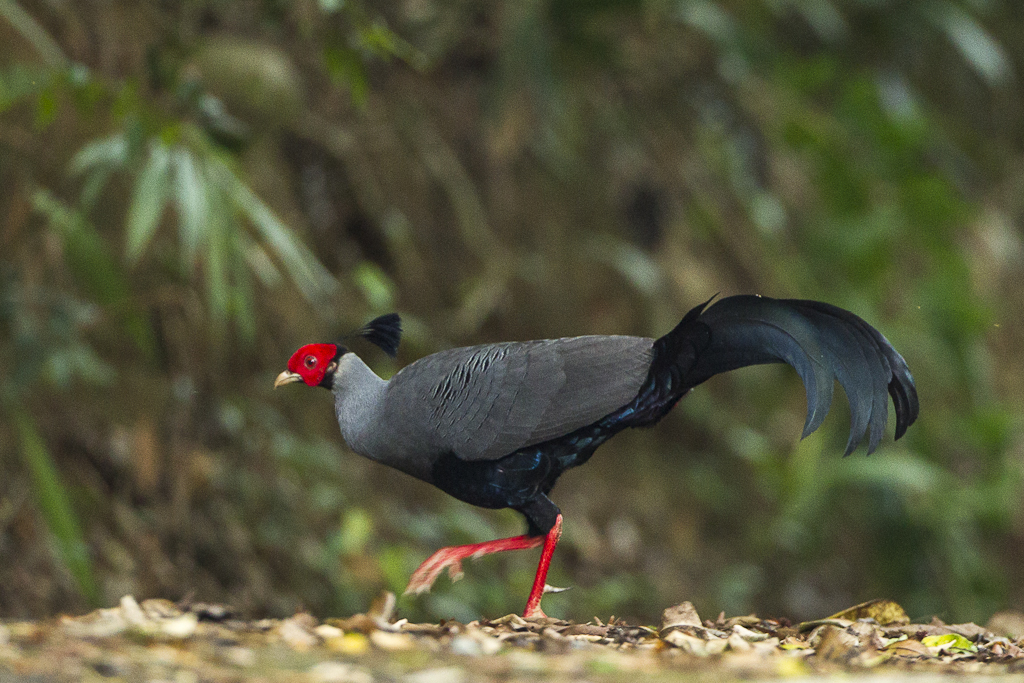
Siamese Fireback, the national bird of Thailand

Khao Soi Dao Wildlife Sanctuary is the only IBA in Thailand supporting the globally endangered Chestnut-headed Partridge (Arborophila cambodiana), but it is home to many more bird species of importance to global conservation. This includes Siamese Fireback (Lophura diardi), Great Hornbill (Buceros bicornis) and Moustached Hawk Cuckoo (Hierococcyx vagans), all of which are near-threatened on a global level. The colourful Blue-rumped Pittas are here, and this is the only place in Thailand where this species live.

Regarding mammals, the sanctuary is also home to a diverse range of species, with many threatened ones, including Asian Elephants (Elephas maximus indicus), Tiger (Panthera tigris), Asian Golden Cat (Catopuma temminckii) and Gaurs (Bos gaurus) are found here. For monkeys, the Pileated Gibbons (Hylobates pileatus) are notable.

The sanctuary is known as a particularly good spot for watching butterflies, but other insects, such as dragonflies are also here in both abundance and diversity.

== Flora ==
Close to all (85%) of the forest in Khao Soi Dao Wildlife Sanctuary is monsoon evergreen forest, but patches of deciduous forest and bamboo thickets are also to be found.

== Khao Soi Dao Waterfall ==
Khao Soi Dao Waterfall (Thai: น้ำตกเขาสอยดาว or Namtok Khao Soi Dao) is a popular tourist destination in the wildlife sanctuary. It is 70 km from the town of Chanthaburi. It springs from Khao Soi Dao Nua at 1,556 meters above sea level and has a total of 16 tiers. The waterfall is located about 4 km from the Wildlife Sanctuary visitor center.

The easy way to get to this waterfall, if you have a car, is to drive from the city on Route 317 through Makham District and Pong Nam Ron District. At km 62 you should turn left and go on 3 km. The waterfall is open from 6.00am to 6.00pm. The most popular attraction at the falls is nature trails because there is a huge tree of 4.77 meters diameter. The waterfall has 16 tiers created by multi-level stone cliffs which gives the impression of a giant staircase. At the bottom is a vast pool with shallow water. The most popular tier is tier 16 because this tier has a lot of moss on the stones, making it feel fresh. This tier is named "Phanangleun" Pha Nang Leun means "Mrs. Slippery Cliff" because the careless walker could slip on the moss. The source of the waterfall is near the Peak of KhaoSoi Dao Nua Mountain at 1,556 meters above sea level. The area is suitable for butterfly watching and the study of plants.

== Location ==
Khao Soi Dao Wildlife Sanctuary in overview PARO 2 (Si Racha)

10) Khao Soi Dao Wildlife Sanctuary in overview PARO 2 (Si Racha)

	National park
1	Khao Chamao-Khao Wong
2	Khao Khitchakut
3	Khao Laem Ya–Mu Ko Samet
4	Khao Sip Ha Chan
5	Namtok Khlong Kaeo
6	Mu Ko Chang
7	Namtok Phlio

	Wildlife sanctuary
8	Khao Ang Rue Nai
9	Khao Khiao– Khao Chomphu
10	Khao Soi Dao
11	Khlong Kruea Wai

	Non-hunting area
12	Bang Phra Reservoir
13	Khao Chi On
14	Khung Kraben
	Forest park
15	Khao Laem Sing
16	Namtok Khao Chao Bo Thong
