= Athapol Charoenshunsa =

Thai conservationist

- อรรถพล เจริญชันษา

Director-General of the Department of National Parks, Wildlife and Plant Conservation
- Incumbent
- Assumed office 25 January 2023
- Minister: Varawut Silpa-archa; Patcharawat Wongsuwan; Chalermchai Sri-on
- Preceded by: Rutchada Suriyakul Na Ayutya

Personal details
- Born: September 5, 1966 (age 59)
- Occupation: Civil Servant

Athapol Charoenshunsa (Thai: อรรถพล เจริญชันษา; RTGS: Atthaphon Charoenchansa; born September 5, 1966) is a Thai conservationist, serving as director-general of the Department of National Parks, Wildlife and Plant Conservation since 2023. Prior to his appointment, he was director-general of Department of Marine and Coastal Resources.

== Career ==
Athapol replaced Rutchada Suriyakul Na Ayutya, who was arrested on 27 December 2022 and charged with bribery.

Athapol has overseen a campaign to remove 2,500 long-tailed macaques from Lopburi, where the monkeys have harassed residents.

On 17 December 2025, Athapol held a forum on implementing birth control for wild elephants in Thailand.
