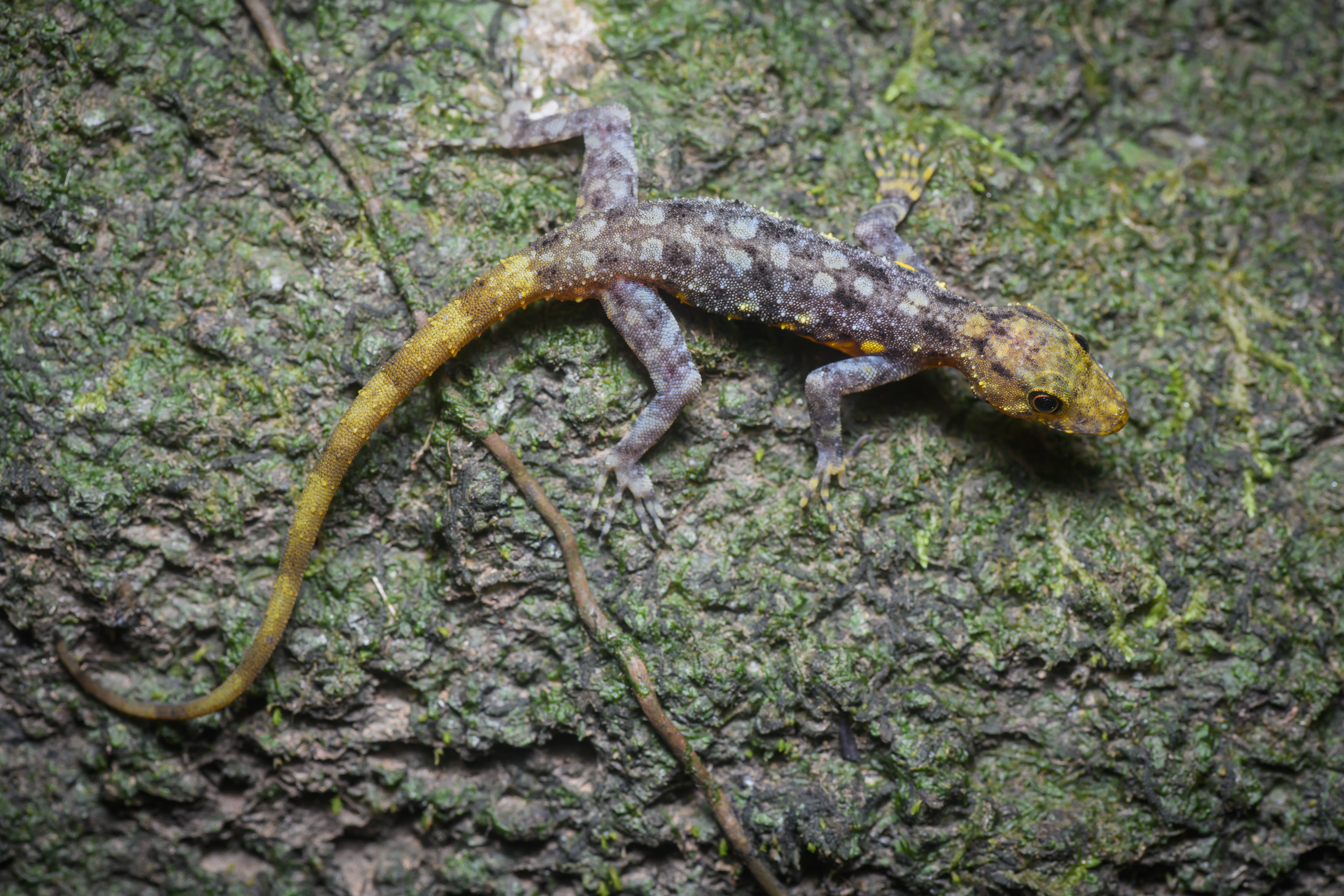

Scientific classification
- Kingdom: Animalia
- Phylum: Chordata
- Class: Reptilia
- Order: Squamata
- Suborder: Gekkota
- Family: Gekkonidae
- Genus: Cnemaspis
- Species: C. chanthaburiensis

Binomial name
- Cnemaspis chanthaburiensis Bauer & Das, 1998

= Chanthaburi rock gecko =

Species of lizard

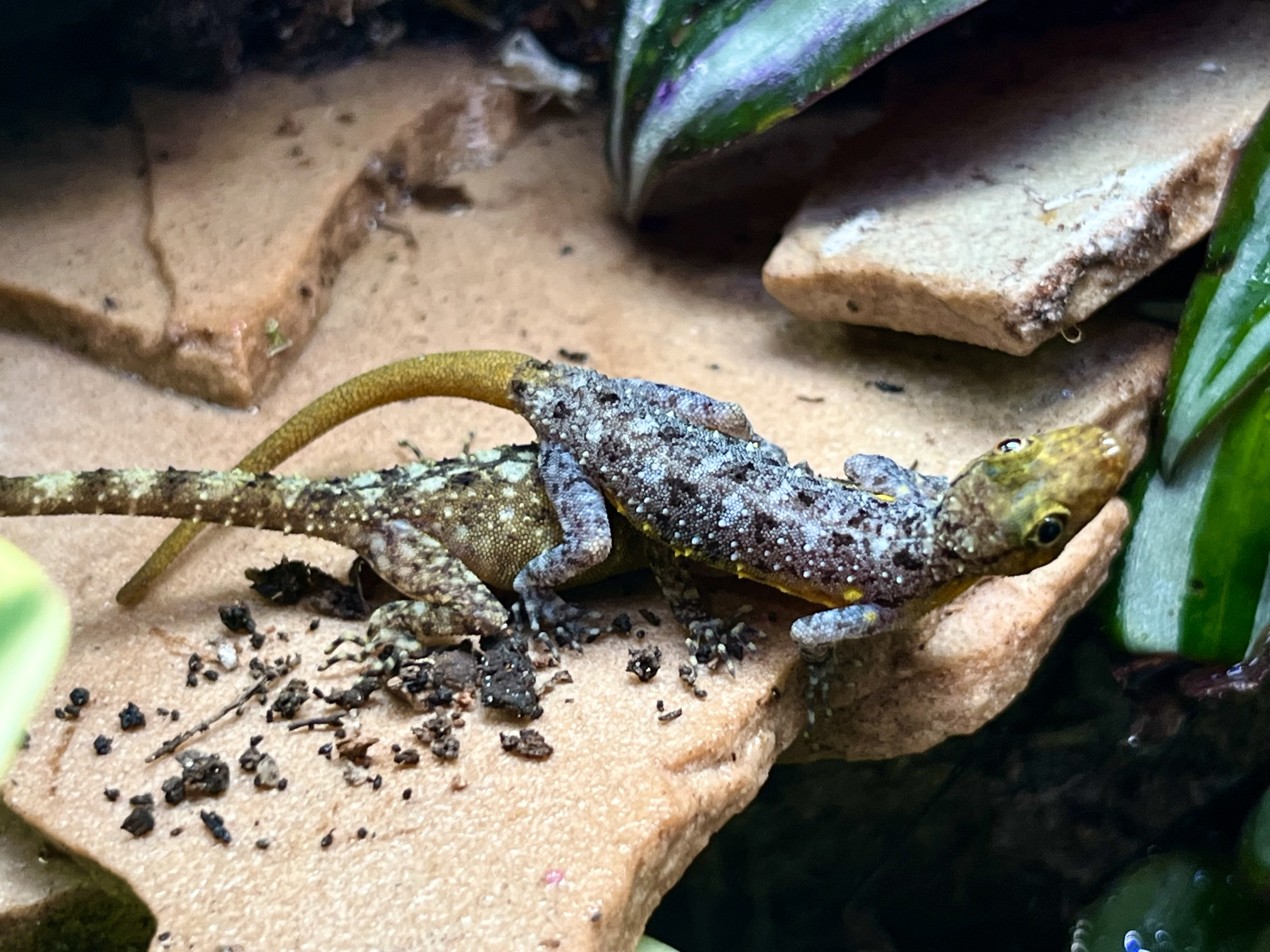
Male And Female Cnemaspis chanthaburiensis Cnemaspis chanthaburiensis Female

The Chanthaburi rock gecko (Cnemaspis chanthaburiensis) is a species of geckos found in Cambodia and eastern Thailand.
