= Khao Ang Rue Nai Wildlife Sanctuary =

Wildlife refuge in Thailand

- เขตรักษาพันธุ์สัตว์ป่าเขาอ่างฤๅไน
- IUCN category Ia (strict nature reserve)
- Location within Thailand
- Location: Thailand
- Nearest city: Kabin Buri
- Coordinates: 13°12′00″N 101°44′00″E
- Area: 1,078 km^{2} (416 sq mi)
- Established: 1977
- Governing body: Department of National Parks, Wildlife and Plant Conservation

The Khao Ang Rue Nai Wildlife Sanctuary (Thai: เขตรักษาพันธุ์สัตว์ป่าเขาอ่างฤๅไน) is a protected area at the western extremities of the Cardamom Mountains in Chachoengsao Province, Thailand. Founded in 1977, it is an IUCN Category IV wildlife sanctuary, with an area of 674,352 rai ~ 1,078 km^{2} (416 sq mi). South-east of, and connected with, the wildlife sanctuary is the Khao Sip Ha Chan National Park. South-west of the protection is the Khao Chamao–Khao Wong National Park.

The sanctuary is partly covered by lowland evergreen forest, along with dry and moist evergreens, mixed deciduous, deciduous dipterocarp, as well as grassland.

== Human-elephant conflict ==
The Thai Department of National Parks (DNP) has estimated that in 2008 the elephant population of Khao Ang Rue Nai was just 219 animals. In recent years this number has grown by 9.83 percent per year, meaning that the reserve now has 275 or so elephants. The twenty new animals born every year exceed the death rate. Their expanding population has meant that they travel further afield in search of food. Thus the villages that border the sanctuary are subject to about 25 raids on crops per month. Due to the average crop damage of six rai per year per household, crop damage costs each household nearly 35,000 baht or 19 percent of average household income. Affected households spend an average of 212 nights awake per year guarding their fields. The DNP has resorted to various measures to reduce the conflict, including growing food crops in the forest for the animals. A spokesman for the DNP noted, on behalf of the elephants, that, "We are also encroaching into forest, making it harder for elephants, which already face limited food sources....it is our task not to invade their homes."

== Location ==
Khao Ang Rue Nai Wildlife Sanctuary in overview PARO 2 (Si Racha)

8) Khao Ang Rue Nai Wildlife Sanctuary in overview PARO 2 (Si Racha)

	National park
1	Khao Chamao-Khao Wong
2	Khao Khitchakut
3	Khao Laem Ya–Mu Ko Samet
4	Khao Sip Ha Chan
5	Namtok Khlong Kaeo
6	Mu Ko Chang
7	Namtok Phlio

	Wildlife sanctuary
8	Khao Ang Rue Nai
9	Khao Khio– Khao Chomphu
10	Khao Soi Dao
11	Khlong Kruea Wai

	Non-hunting area
12	Bang Phra Reservoir
13	Khao Chi On
14	Khung Kraben
	Forest park
15	Khao Laem Sing
16	Namtok Khao Chao Bo Thong

== Source ==
- Khao Angruenai in Thailand
