= Khao Khiao Massif =

Mountain range in Chonburi, Thailand

- เขาเขียว
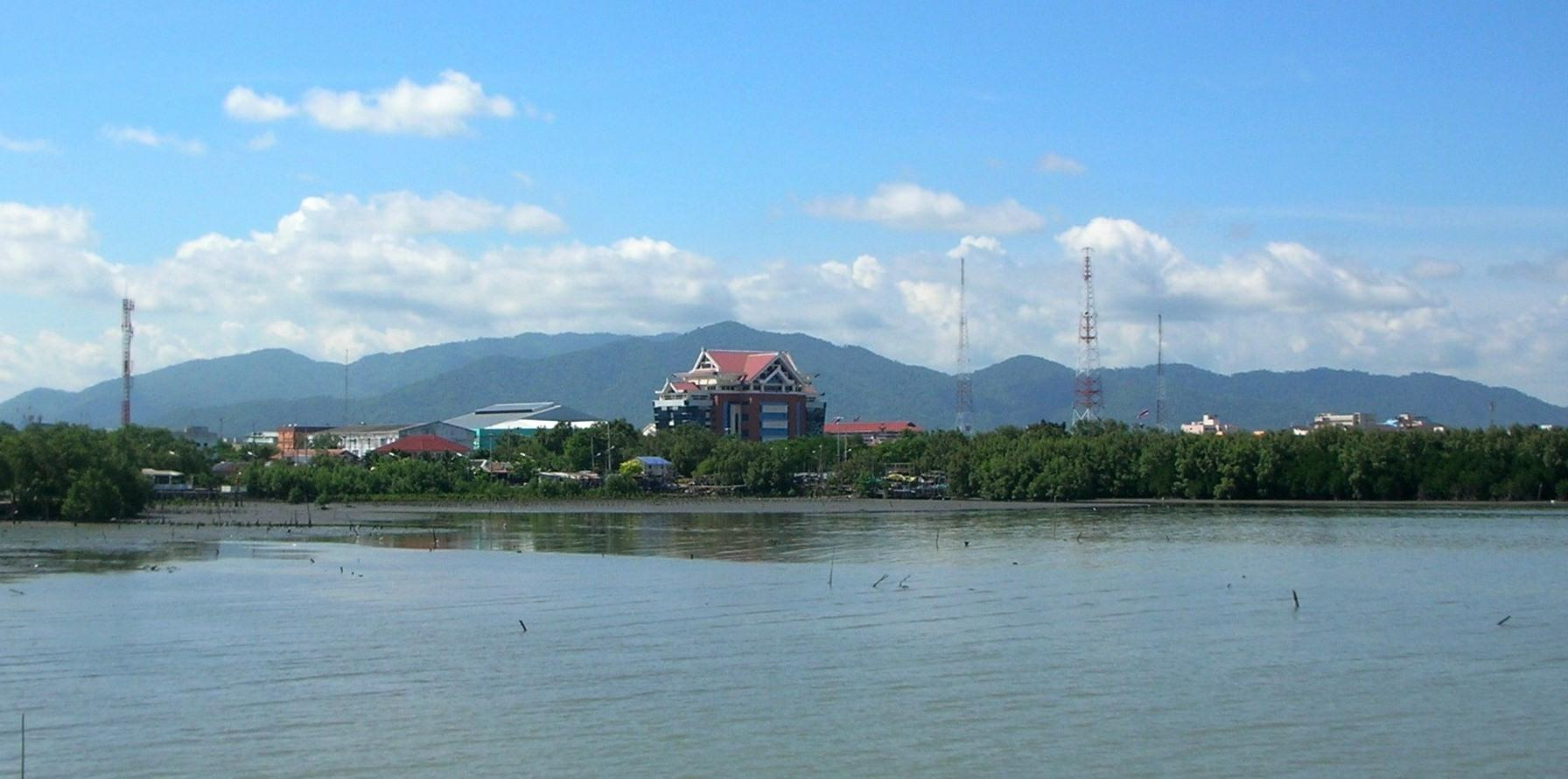
- The Khao Khiao Massif rising east of Chonburi town

Highest point
- Peak: Khao Khiao
- Elevation: 789 m (2,589 ft)
- Coordinates: 13°14′45″N 101°4′15″E

Dimensions
- Length: 20 km (12 mi) N/S
- Width: 10 km (6.2 mi) E/W

Geography
- Location within Thailand
- Country: Thailand
- Region: Chonburi Province
- Range coordinates: 13°14.5′N 101°4′E

Geology
- Rock type(s): Sandstone, conglomerate

The Khao Khiao Massif (Thai: เขาเขียว, pronounced [kʰǎw kʰǐa̯w]) is a moderately high mountain range near Chonburi, eastern Thailand. This massif has the last substantial forested zone in Chonburi Province, a region that is much affected by urbanization and other forms of human intervention and land degradation.

Khao Khiao is the mountain area closest to Bangkok, rising about 70 km to the southeast of the capital.

== Description ==
The mountains of the massif are smooth and forested. They are partly covered with dry and moist broadleaf forest in the lower ranges.

The Khao Khiao Massif rises east of the Motorway 7 to Pattaya and Rayong. The highest point in the mountains is the 789 m (2,589 ft) high Khao Khiao.

== Protected area ==
The Khao Khiao – Khao Chomphu Wildlife Sanctuary (Thai: เขตรักษาพันธุ์สัตว์ป่าเขาเขียว-เขาชมภู่) is a protected area in the massif. Founded in 1974, it is an IUCN Category IV wildlife sanctuary, measuring 145 square kilometres (56 sq mi) in area.

The Khao Kheow Open Zoo is at the foot of the mountain massif on its southern side.

== See also ==
- List of mountains in Thailand
