= Khao Sip Ha Chan National Park =

National park in Thailand

- อุทยานแห่งชาติเขาสิบห้าชั้น
- IUCN category II (national park)
- Location within Thailand
- Location: Chanthaburi Province
- Nearest city: Chanthaburi
- Coordinates: 13°06′N 102°00′E
- Area: 117.96 km^{2} (45.54 sq mi)
- Established: 2 December 2009
- Governing body: Department of National Parks, Wildlife and Plant Conservation (DNP)

Khao Sip Ha Chan National Park (Thai: อุทยานแห่งชาติเขาสิบห้าชั้น, RTGS: Utthayan Haeng Chat Khao Sip Ha Chan) is a national park in Chanthaburi Province, Thailand.

== Features ==
The park is part of a larger forest cluster in eastern Thailand, along with the adjacent Khao Ang Rue Nai Wildlife Sanctuary and Khao Chamao–Khao Wong National Park. The forests in the park are healthy evergreen Rainforests, inhabited by many animals such as Clouded Leopards, Gaur and roughly 60 Asian Elephants.

There are waterfalls and streams which are open to visitors, however caution should be exercised during the rainy season, as the current will get very strong. Camping is also available and is popular between November and April.
