= Namtok Khlong Kaeo National Park =

National park in Thailand

- IUCN category II (national park)
- Khlong Kaeo waterfall

- Park location in Thailand
- Location: Thailand
- Nearest city: Trat
- Coordinates: 12.62°N 102.58°E
- Area: 199 km^{2} (77 sq mi)
- Established: 2009
- Governing body: Department of National Parks, Wildlife and Plant Conservation

Namtok Khlong Kaeo National Park is a national park in Trat province, Thailand. The park is home to waterfalls and tropical forests.

== Geography ==
Namtok Khlong Kaeo National Park is in Bo Rai district of Trat province. The park is bordered on the east by Cambodia. It is about 50 km (30 mi) north of the provincial capital Trat and about 80 km (50 mi) east of Chanthaburi. The park's area is 199 km^{2} (77 sq mi). The park's highest point is Khao Ta Bat peak at 836 m (2,743 ft), in the Cardamom Mountains.

== Attractions ==
The park's highest waterfall is the namesake Khlong Kaeo waterfall, with seven levels. Other park waterfalls include Than Hin Dat waterfall, with three levels.

== Flora and fauna ==
Park forest types include evergreen forests. Plant species include Dipterocarpus dyeri, Hopea ferrea and Anisoptera costata. There are also Paphiopedilum orchids.

The park hosts animals including tiger, sun bear, lutung, chevrotain, muntjac, sambar deer and palm civet. Birds in the park include black-crested bulbul, koel and white-rumped shama.
