= Department of National Parks, Wildlife and Plant Conservation =

Thai government agency

- กรมอุทยานแห่งชาติ สัตว์ป่า และพันธุ์พืช
- Seal of the Rukha Deva, holding a sword and a magnifying glass

Agency overview
- Formed: 3 October 2002; 23 years ago
- Jurisdiction: Government of Thailand
- Headquarters: Bangkok, Thailand
- Annual budget: 11,574 million baht (2018); 385 million USD
- Agency executive: Athapol Charoenshunsa, Director-General
- Parent department: Ministry of Natural Resources and Environment
- Website: portal.dnp.go.th

The Department of National Parks, Wildlife and Plant Conservation (DNP; Thai: กรมอุทยานแห่งชาติ สัตว์ป่า และพันธุ์พืช, romanized: Kromutyanhaengchati Satpa Laephanphuet) is an agency of the Ministry of Natural Resources and Environment. Its headquarters are in Chatuchak District, Bangkok. Since January 2023, the director-general of the DNP has been Athapol Charoenshunsa. In FY2018 DNP's budget is 11,574 million baht.

== History ==
The DNP was established in 2002, assuming management of Thailand's national parks previously managed by the Royal Forest Department of the Ministry of Agriculture.

== Financials ==
DNP income is derived from entrance fees at national parks. The costs of managing Thailand's national parks are met through the government's central budget, as well as by park entrance fees. As of 2016, admission to national parks is 60 baht for Thais and 300 baht for foreigners. During the first 11 months of its 2016 fiscal year starting October 2015, DNP revenues totaled 1.82 billion baht, almost doubling as compared with 2015. Revenue in 2011 was 496 million baht. It declined to 366 million baht in 2012, a year of severe flooding in Thailand. The figure rose to 622 million baht in 2013, 696 million baht in 2014, and 896 million baht in 2015. Officials attribute the sharp increase in FY2016 to more visitors, especially Chinese tourists, and more staff assigned to collect entrance fees.

== Initiatives ==
In mid-2018, DNP launched a program to ban plastic bags, Styrofoam containers, plastic cutlery, and plastic straws in Thailand's 154 national parks. The initial goal is to reduce plastic waste by three million pieces. Park vendors may not use plastics and park visitors will be prohibited from bringing single-use plastic items into the parks.

== See also ==
- List of national parks of Thailand
