= Khanom khuai ling =

Thai dessert

- Type: Thai dessert
- Place of origin: Thailand
- Region or state: eastern Thailand
- Created by: Chanthaburi people
- Main ingredients: Glutinous rice flour, sugar, black sesame seeds, shredded coconut

Khanom khuai ling (Thai: ขนมควยลิง, pronounced [kʰā.nǒm kʰūaj līŋ]; lit. 'monkey dick snack') is a local dessert from Chanthaburi in eastern Thailand. Khanom khuai ling is a traditional dessert named after its appearance which looks like a monkey's penis. It has been made for more than 100 years.

It is said that the inventor of this dessert named it after seeing the male genitalia of the monkeys that live in the area.

This type of dessert is made from glutinous rice flour, molded into a long shape like a monkey penis, mixed with sugar, black sesame seeds and sprinkled with shredded coconut.

Khanom khuai ling is produced and sold only in the area of Mueang Chanthaburi District, especially at the Chumchon Khanom Plaek (ชุมชนขนมแปลก, lit. 'peculiar dessert community'), an ancient community that is a center of many local foods and rare Thai desserts, located along the Khlong Nong Bua near Chanthaburi River, about 10 km (6 mi) from the heart of the district.
