= Diocese of Chanthaburi =

Latin Catholic diocese in Thailand

Diocese of Chanthaburi Dioecesis Chanthaburiensis สังฆมณฑลจันทบุรี
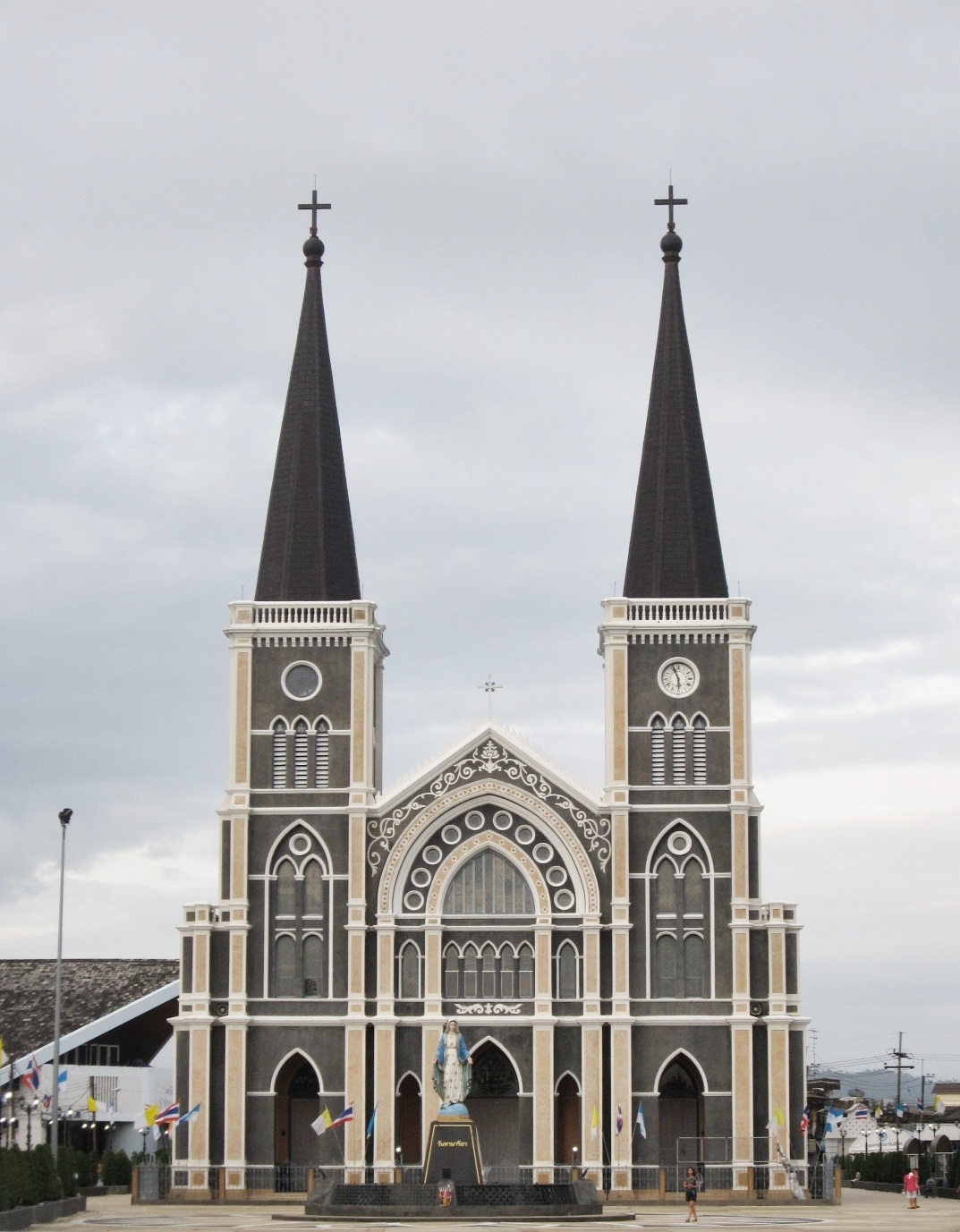
- Cathedral of the Immaculate Conception

Location
- Country: Thailand
- Metropolitan: Bangkok

Statistics
- Area: 34,000 km^{2} (13,000 sq mi)
- Population: Total; Catholics: (as of 2023); 5,165,783; 55,851 (1.1%)
- Parishes: 41

Information
- Denomination: Catholic
- Sui iuris church: Latin Church
- Rite: Roman Rite
- Cathedral: Cathedral of the Immaculate Conception, Chanthaburi
- Secular priests: 100

Current leadership
- Pope: Leo XIV
- Bishop: Philip Adisak Phorn-Ngam
- Metropolitan Archbishop: Francis Xavier Vira Arpondratana
- Bishops emeritus: Lawrence Thienchai Samanchit Bishop Emeritus (since 2009)

Map
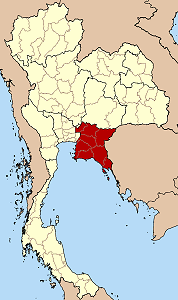

The Diocese of Chanthaburi (Dioecesis Chanthaburiensis, Thai: สังฆมณฑลจันทบุรี) is a Latin Catholic ecclesiastical jurisdiction located in eastern central Thailand. It is a suffragan diocese of the archdiocese of Bangkok.

The diocese covers an area of 34,000 km^{2}, covering the provinces - Chanthaburi, Chonburi, Prachinburi, Rayong, Sa Kaeo and Trat, as well as the parts east of the Bang Pa Kong River in Chachoengsao, and Nakhon Nayok except the district Ban Na.

As of 2023, of the 5,165,783 citizens 55,851 are Catholics. It is divided into 41 parishes, having 100 priests altogether.

== History ==
On May 11, 1944, the Vicariate Apostolic of Chantaburi was split off from the Vicariate Apostolic of Bangkok. On December 18, 1965, it was elevated to a diocese.

== Cathedral ==
The Cathedral of the Immaculate Conception (Thai: อาสนวิหารพระนางมารีอาปฏิสนธินิรมล) is the largest church of Thailand. A first missionary chapel was built at the site in 1711. After being enlarged and rebuilt four times during the nineteenth century, especially due to the immigration of Vietnamese Christians fleeing religious persecution in the home country. In 1909 it was rebuilt in its current Gothic style. It is located at the Chanthanimit Road on the left bank of the Chanthaburi River. During World War II the spires were taken down to make the church a less obvious navigational aid to allied bombers; they have since been replaced.

== Bishops ==
- Giacomo Luigi Cheng: May 11, 1944 – April 14, 1952
- Francis Xavier Sanguon Souvannasri: January 8, 1953 – April 3, 1970 (Resigned)
- Lawrence Thienchai Samanchit: July 3, 1971 – April 4, 2009
- Silvio Siripong Charatsri: April 4, 2009 – June 13, 2023, appointed Bishop of Ratchaburi
- Philip Adisak Phorn-Ngam: appointed November 11, 2024

Before the vicariate apostolic was elevated to a diocese, the bishops were assigned a titular see.

== See also ==
- Catholic Church in Thailand
