= Chanthaboon Waterfront Community =

Community in Chanthaburi, Thailand

Coordinates: 12°36′36″N 102°06′36″E

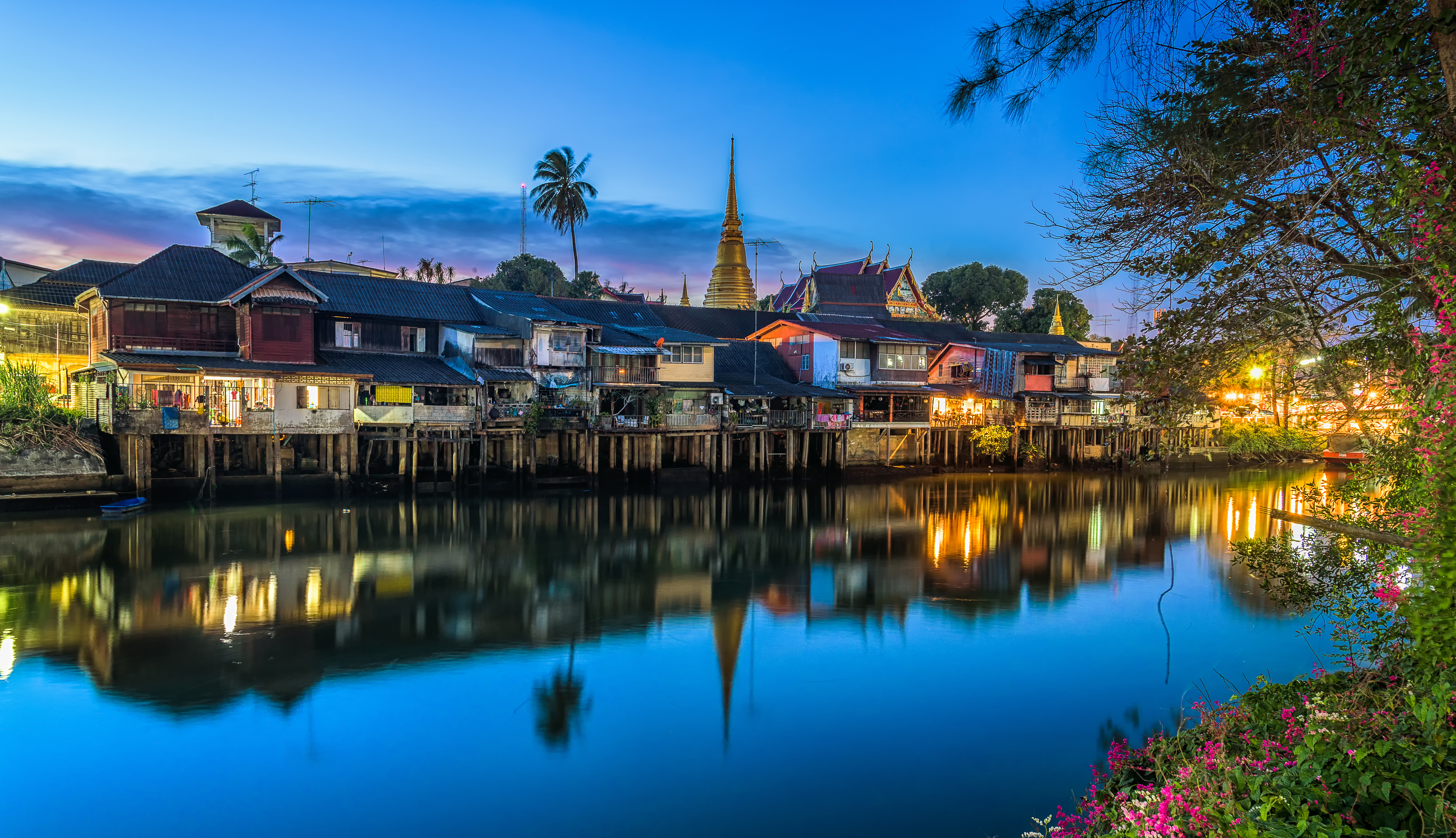
Chanthaboon Waterfront Community at dusk

Chanthaboon Waterfront Community or Chanthaboon Riverside Community (Thai: ชุมชนริมน้ำจันทบูร) is an ancient waterfront community in the heart of Mueang Chanthaburi District, Chanthaburi Province in eastern Thailand. It is sometimes also written as Chantaboon Waterfront Community.

The traditional community dates back to King Narai the Great's reign of Ayutthaya Kingdom (more than 300 years), regarded as the first community of Chanthaburi. The ancestors of this community people are three ethnic group, Thai, Chinese and Vietnamese. In the King Chulalongkorn (Rama V)'s reign, it was regarded as the center of the province and was a trading and travel destination for the eastern region.

At present, it is another cultural attraction of Chanthaburi. There are many old buildings in Sino-Portuguese and Gingerbread styles lined up on a one-km (0.6 mi) long pedestrian street along the Chanthaburi River (locally known as Chanthaboon River). The river is known as Mae Nam Chanthaburi by local people. Two of the buildings, Baan Luang Rachamaitri (บ้านหลวงราชไมตรี) is Unesco's award winning project. Luang Rachamaitri was a Thai aristocrat during the King Chulalongkorn period, who was the first to bring rubber seeds to grow in Thailand. Presently, his house has been renovated to be a historic inn on the second floor offering well-equipped rooms and river views. While the ground floor is free for anyone who interested in antiques and museum. And House No.69 (บ้านเลขที่ 69), the house of Khun Anusorn Sombat is the community learning center, exhibits its history and old photos of the community.

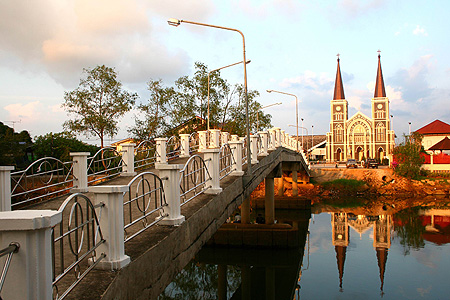
Niramon Bridge (สะพานนิรมล, "Immaculate Bridge"), the bridge over Chanthaburi River is the entrance of the community and link between church and community together

Chanthaboon Waterfront Community situated along the Chanthaburi River, opposite the Cathedral of the Immaculate Conception, a historic building and recognized as the most beautiful Catholic church in Thailand. A Chinese temple by name 'Chao Mae Kuan Im' is a prominent landmark inside the Chantaboon Waterfront Community. Also, notable is the Chanthaburi Gemstone market that is ancient and is nearby.

The entire length of the street is lined with restaurants, sweet shops, antique shophouses, cafés, traditional drug store, joss houses as well as guest houses. Some walls are lathered with chic graffiti in form of photo spot for visitors.
