= Chanthaburi River =

River in Thailand

Chanthaburi River Chanthaboon River
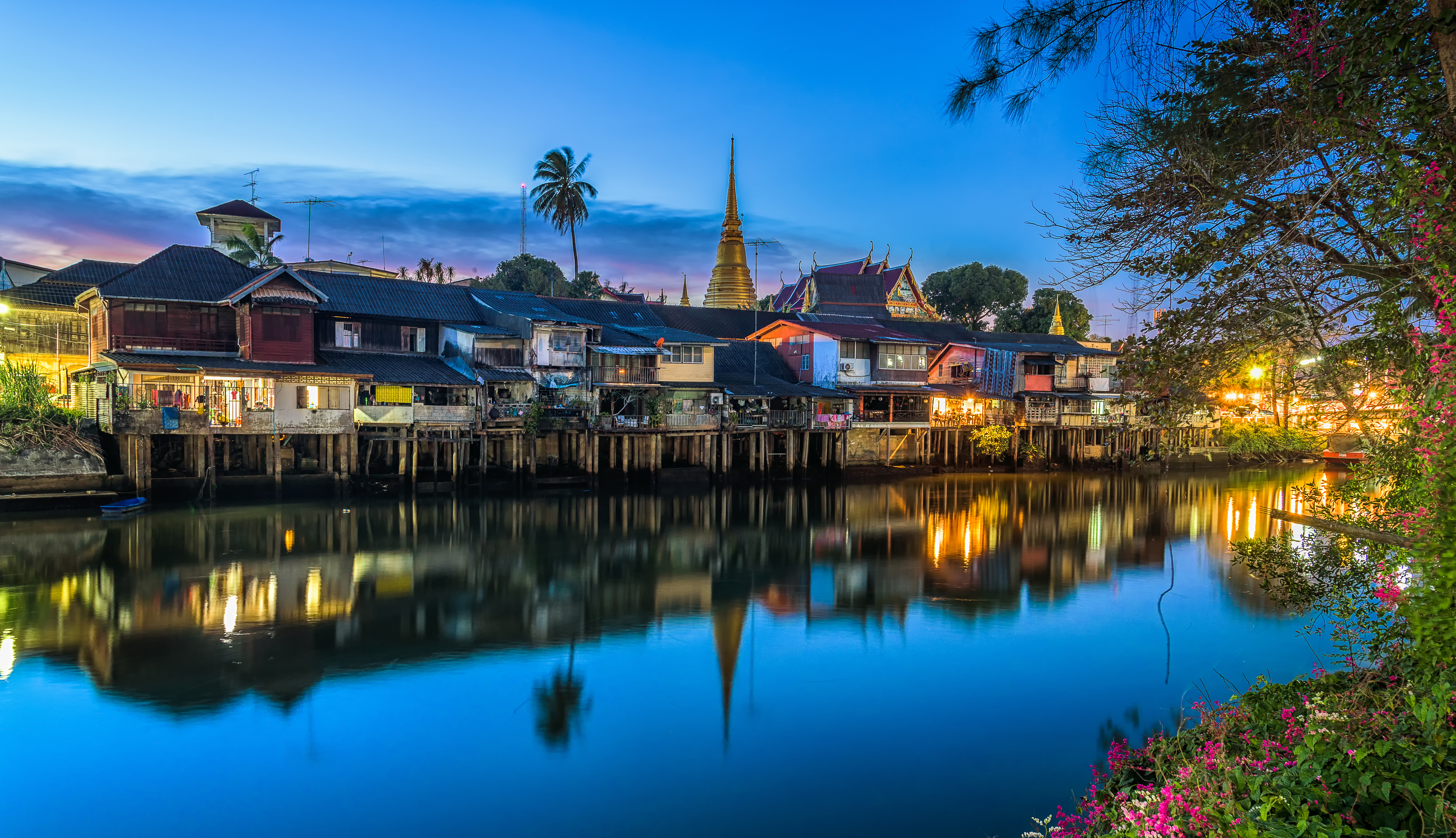
- The Chanthaboon Waterfront Community

- Location of the river mouth in Thailand
- Native name: แม่น้ำจันทบุรี (Thai)

Location
- Country: Thailand
- Province: Chanthaburi
- Districts: Khao Khitchakut, Makham, Mueang Chanthaburi, Laem Sing
- Town: Chanthaburi

Physical characteristics
- Source: North Soi Dao Mountain
  - location: Soi Dao Mountains, Chanthaburi province
- Mouth: Gulf of Thailand
  - location: Pak Nam Laem Sing, Laem Sing district, Chanthaburi province
  - coordinates: 12°28′47″N 102°03′32″E
  - elevation: 0 m (0 ft)
- Length: 120 km (75 mi)
- Basin size: 1,682 km^{2} (649 sq mi)
- Discharge
  - location: Makham (station 01180303)
  - average: 28.6 m^{3}/s (1,010 cu ft/s)
  - minimum: 0.29 m^{3}/s (10 cu ft/s)
  - maximum: 360 m^{3}/s (13,000 cu ft/s)

Basin features
- Bridges: Taksin Maharat Bridge
- Source: Hydrological data of the UNESCO International Hydrological Programme (2002)

Chanthaburi River (Thai: แม่น้ำจันทบุรี), formerly and still colloquially known as Chanthabun River (แม่น้ำจันทบูร) is a river in Thailand, regarded as the main watercourse of Chanthaburi Province.

This river is about 120 km (74 mi) long. It is considered to be the longest river in the Eastern Thailand. Chanthaburi River originates from Khao Soi Dao Tai mountain in Pong Nam Ron District, Khao Sam Ngam and Khao Cha Am in the area of Makham District, flowing through Mueang Chanthaburi District to the Gulf of Thailand in Laem Sing District. It bisects Mueang Chanthaburi. However, it was locally known as Khlong Chanthaburi (คลองจันทบุรี). It has important tributaries including Khlong Ta Rong (คลองตารอง), Khlong Ta Lio (คลองตาหลิว), Khlong Thung Phen (คลองทุ่งเพล), Khlong Prue or Khlong Phayat (คลองปรือหรือคลองพยาธิ) etc.

The phase of Chanthaburi River that flowing through the district of Mueang Chanthaburi has historical significance, because it is the location of the traditional community of three ethnic group, consist of Thai, Chinese and Vietnamese. It previously was called Baan Lum (บ้านลุ่ม). Cathedral of the Immaculate Conception, a historic building and recognized as the most beautiful Catholic church in Thailand, located on the east bank of the river.

In the reign of King Rama V, it was an important route for traveling and trading. Traveling from Chanthaburi to Bangkok, it takes about three days. The main pier called Tha Pracha Niyom (ท่าประชานิยม).

== Gallery ==
Sign for the Bhakti Rambhai Canal flood control project

The river in Chanthaburi

The Cathedral of the Immaculate Conception seen across the river

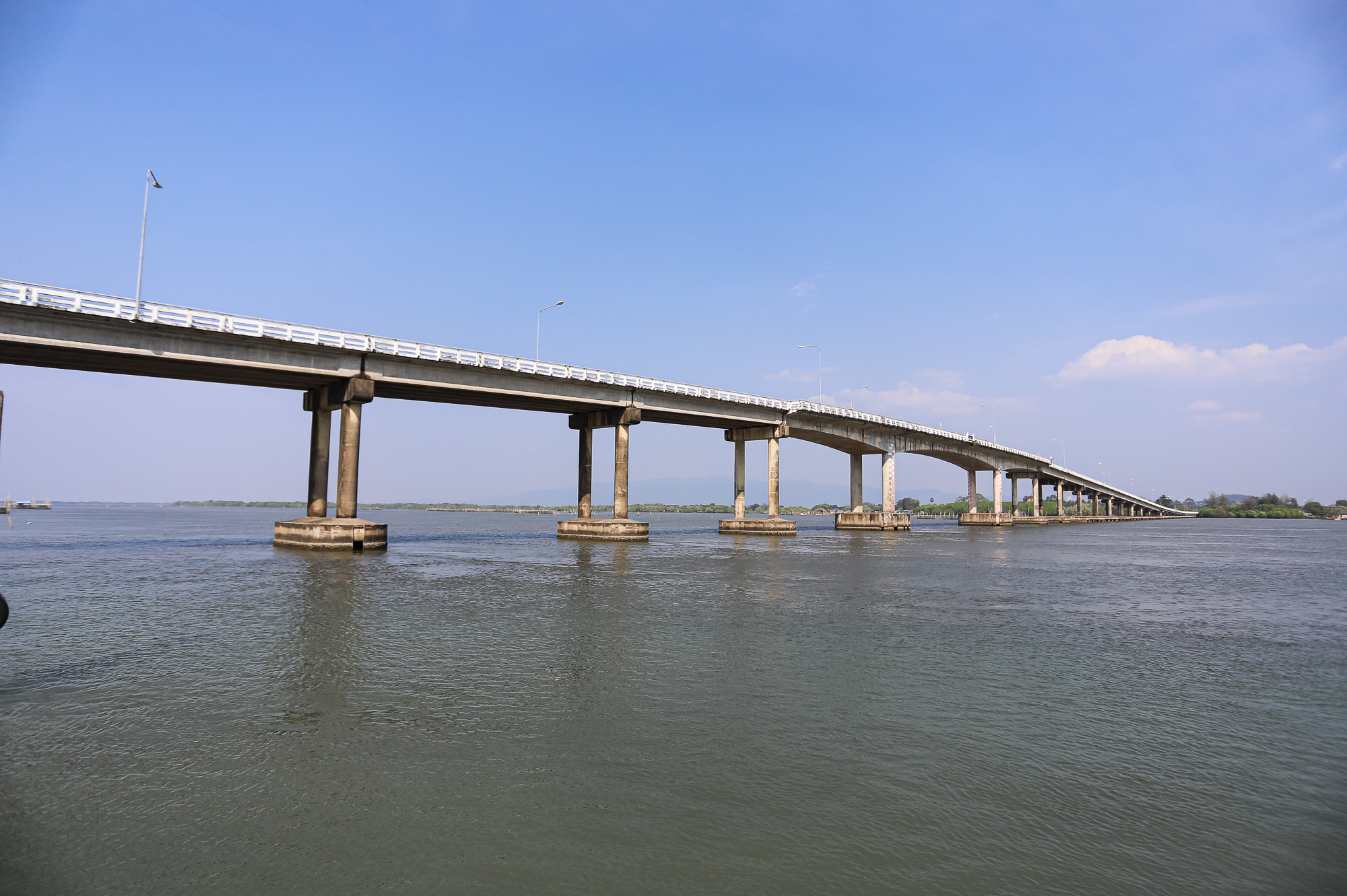
The Taksin Maharat Bridge near the river mouth

== Other websites ==
- Media related to Chanthaburi River at Wikimedia Commons
