= Chanthaburi =

Chanthaburi จันทบุรี
- Town
- เทศบาลเมืองจันทบุรี
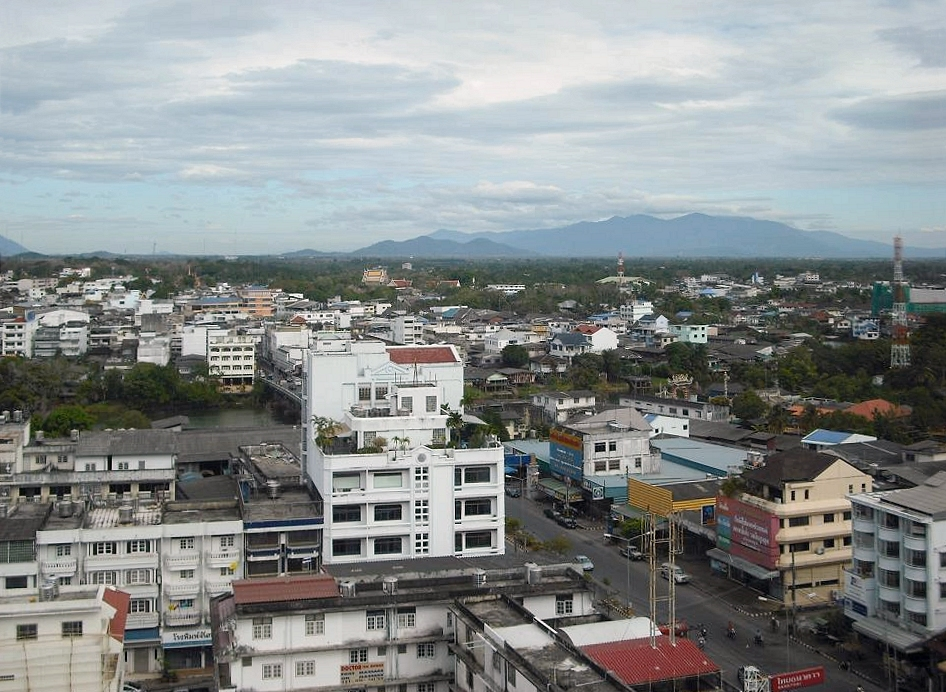

- Seal

- Location in Thailand
- Coordinates: 12°36′31″N 102°16′14″E
- Country: Thailand
- Province: Chanthaburi Province
- District: Mueang Chanthaburi District

Area
  - Total: 3.96 sq mi (10.25 km^{2})
- Elevation: 33 ft (10 m)

Population (2018)
  - Total: 23,130
  - Density: 5,844.5/sq mi (2,256.58/km^{2})
- Time zone: UTC+7 (ICT)
- Website: https://chanmunic.go.th/

Chanthaburi (Thai: จันทบุรี, pronounced [tɕān.tʰá(ʔ).bū.rīː]) is a town (thesaban mueang) in the east of Thailand, on the banks of the Chanthaburi River. It is the capital of the Chanthaburi Province and the Mueang Chanthaburi District.

The town covers the two tambons Talat and Wat Mai of Mueang Chanthaburi District. As of 2005, the town had a population of 27,602. The town figures in the legacy of King Taksin. In 1981 the Thai cabinet passed a resolution to bestow on him the honorary title of the Great. When the Bank of Thailand issued the 12th Series of banknotes, called The Great Series, the monument of King Taksin the Great in the town's Tungnachaey recreational park appeared on the back of the 20 baht note issued 28 December 1981, the 214th anniversary of his coronation.

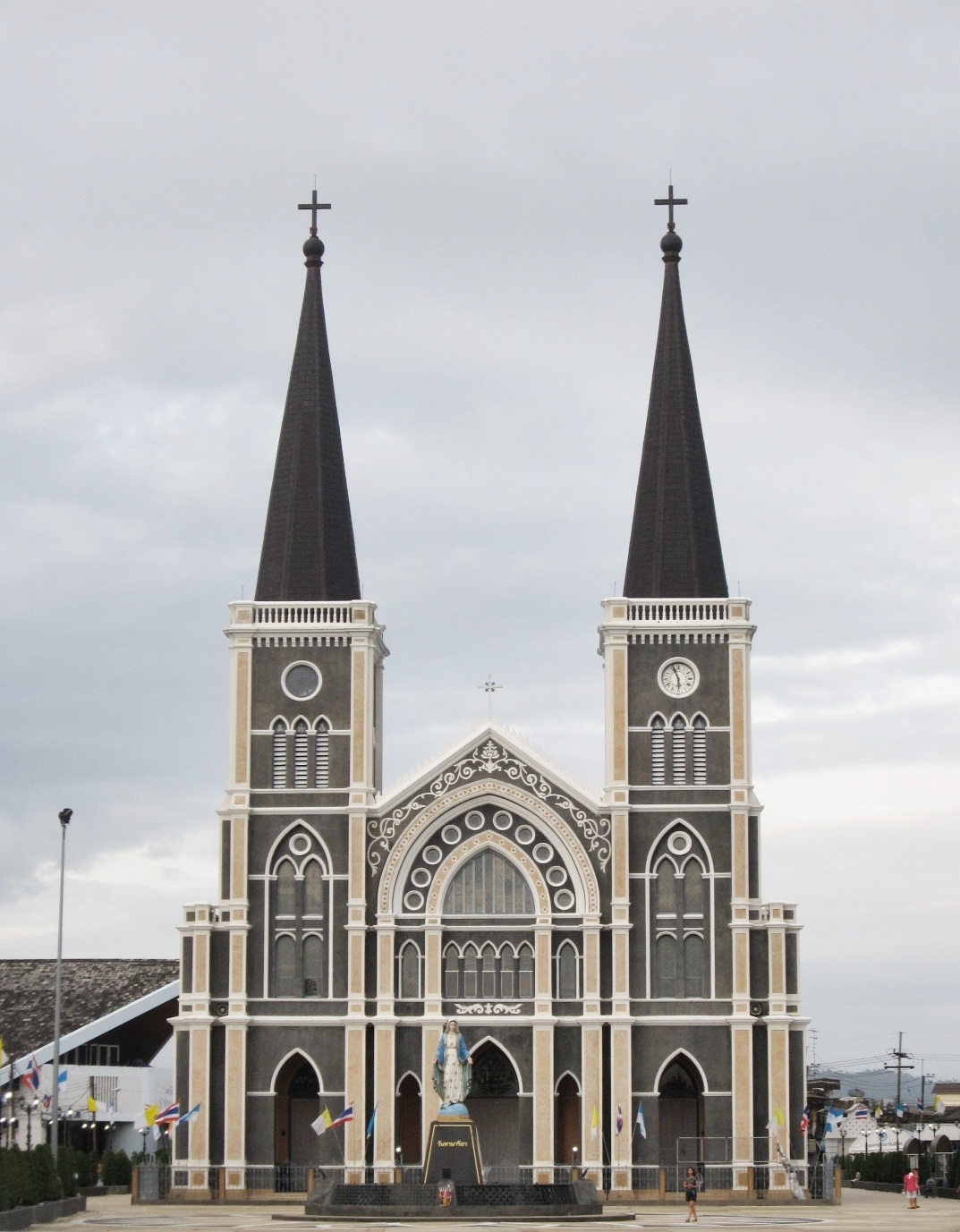
Cathedral of the Immaculate Conception

The Cathedral of the Immaculate Conception, the principal church of the Roman Catholic Diocese of Chanthaburi, is the largest church in Thailand.

== Climate ==
Chanthaburi has a tropical monsoon climate (Köppen climate classification Am), with little variation in temperature throughout the year. Rainfall, however, varies dramatically by season. Rainfall is light and infrequent in the short dry season (December to February), but the wet season (April to October) features torrential rain. March and November are transitional months, during which significant rainfall may occur in some years, while in other years little rain falls.

Climate data for Chanthaburi (1991–2020, extremes 1951-present)
Month	Jan	Feb	Mar	Apr	May	Jun	Jul	Aug	Sep	Oct	Nov	Dec	Year
Record high °C (°F)	36.6 (97.9)	37.7 (99.9)	37.2 (99.0)	37.3 (99.1)	37.5 (99.5)	35.0 (95.0)	36.0 (96.8)	35.7 (96.3)	35.5 (95.9)	35.6 (96.1)	36.3 (97.3)	35.5 (95.9)	37.7 (99.9)
Mean daily maximum °C (°F)	32.6 (90.7)	32.9 (91.2)	33.3 (91.9)	34.1 (93.4)	33.3 (91.9)	32.2 (90.0)	31.7 (89.1)	31.5 (88.7)	31.6 (88.9)	32.4 (90.3)	32.6 (90.7)	32.1 (89.8)	32.5 (90.6)
Daily mean °C (°F)	26.7 (80.1)	27.4 (81.3)	28.4 (83.1)	28.9 (84.0)	28.6 (83.5)	28.2 (82.8)	27.9 (82.2)	27.8 (82.0)	27.4 (81.3)	27.3 (81.1)	27.3 (81.1)	26.5 (79.7)	27.7 (81.9)
Mean daily minimum °C (°F)	22.1 (71.8)	23.2 (73.8)	24.4 (75.9)	25.0 (77.0)	25.3 (77.5)	25.2 (77.4)	25.0 (77.0)	25.0 (77.0)	24.6 (76.3)	24.2 (75.6)	23.4 (74.1)	22.1 (71.8)	24.1 (75.4)
Record low °C (°F)	11.2 (52.2)	14.8 (58.6)	14.5 (58.1)	17.9 (64.2)	21.8 (71.2)	21.9 (71.4)	21.4 (70.5)	21.4 (70.5)	21.2 (70.2)	18.7 (65.7)	13.0 (55.4)	8.9 (48.0)	8.9 (48.0)
Average precipitation mm (inches)	28.0 (1.10)	36.0 (1.42)	83.8 (3.30)	128.1 (5.04)	372.1 (14.65)	499.7 (19.67)	511.2 (20.13)	456.2 (17.96)	538.3 (21.19)	272.5 (10.73)	57.3 (2.26)	8.4 (0.33)	2,991.6 (117.78)
Average precipitation days (≥ 1.0 mm)	1.9	3.1	5.1	8.2	18.4	21.3	21.4	20.8	21.6	14.6	4.4	1.0	141.8
Average relative humidity (%)	69.2	73.8	76.9	78.4	82.5	84.2	84.3	84.4	86.0	81.9	72.3	66.5	78.4
Average dew point °C (°F)	20.1 (68.2)	21.9 (71.4)	23.6 (74.5)	24.5 (76.1)	25.1 (77.2)	25.1 (77.2)	24.8 (76.6)	24.8 (76.6)	24.6 (76.3)	23.7 (74.7)	21.6 (70.9)	19.3 (66.7)	23.3 (73.9)
Mean monthly sunshine hours	229.4	180.8	201.5	204.0	117.8	57.0	58.9	58.9	54.0	145.7	189.0	226.3	1,723.3
Mean daily sunshine hours	7.4	6.4	6.5	6.8	3.8	1.9	1.9	1.9	1.8	4.7	6.3	7.3	4.7
Source 1: World Meteorological Organization
Source 2: Office of Water Management and Hydrology, Royal Irrigation Department (sun 1981–2010)(extremes)

== Transportation ==
Route 3 (Sukhumvit Road) passes near Chanthaburi and connects the city to Rayong, Pattaya, Chonburi, and Bangkok to the northwest and Trat to the southeast. Route 317 connects Chanthaburi to Sa Kaeo.
