= Chao Lao Beach =

Beach in Thailand

Coordinates: 12.5337°N 101.9405°E

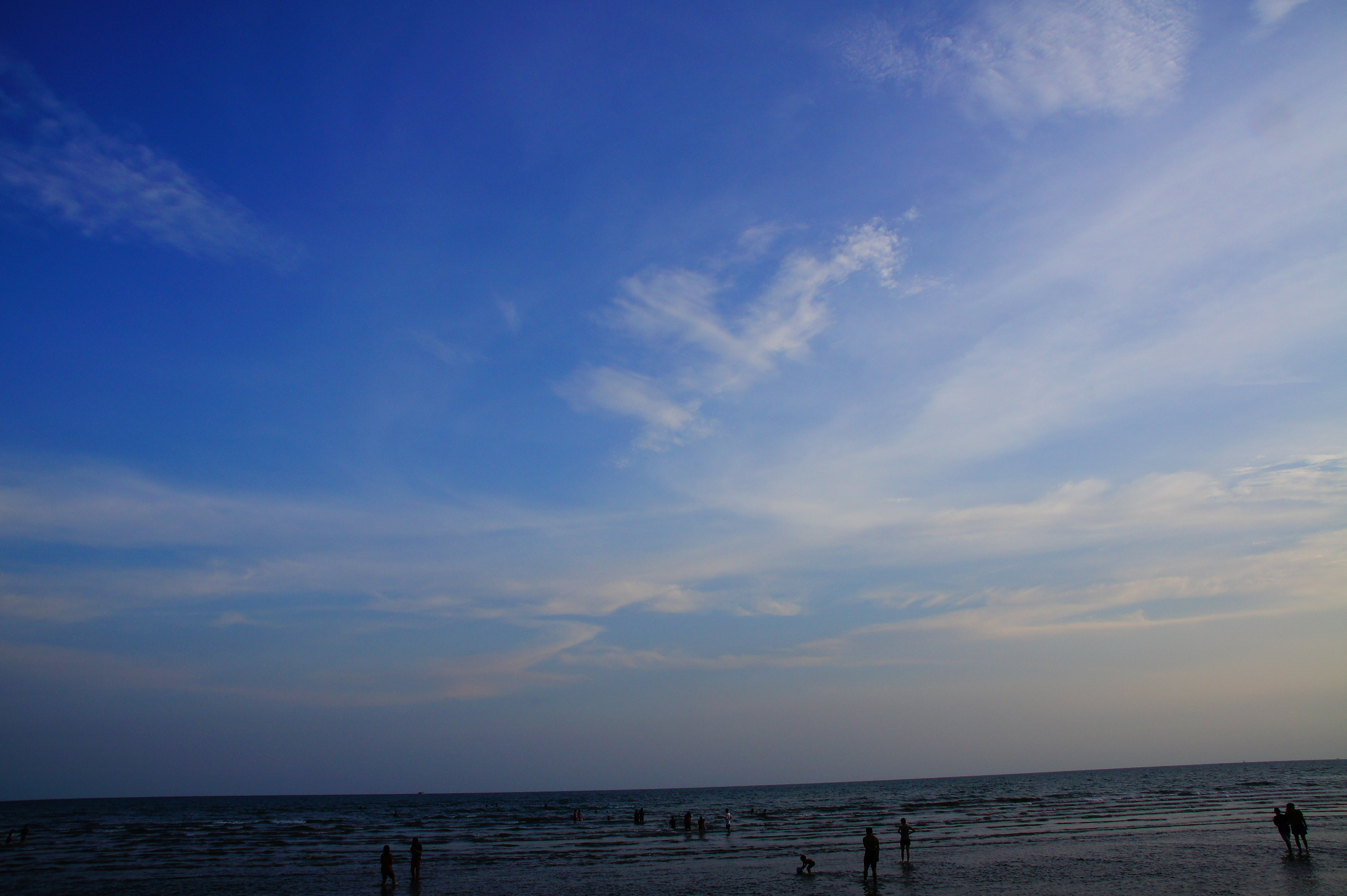
Chao Lao Beach

Hat Chao Lao (Thai: หาดเจ้าหลาว, pronounced [hàːt t͡ɕâːw laːw]) is a beach in Chanthaburi province, Thailand.

The beach lies on the Gulf of Thailand seacoast in Chanthaburi's Tha Mai district.

Its name, the word lao refers to a type of fishing tool that has the shape of a sharp-pointed stick that is often planted along the beach.
