= Makham district =

Makham มะขาม
- District
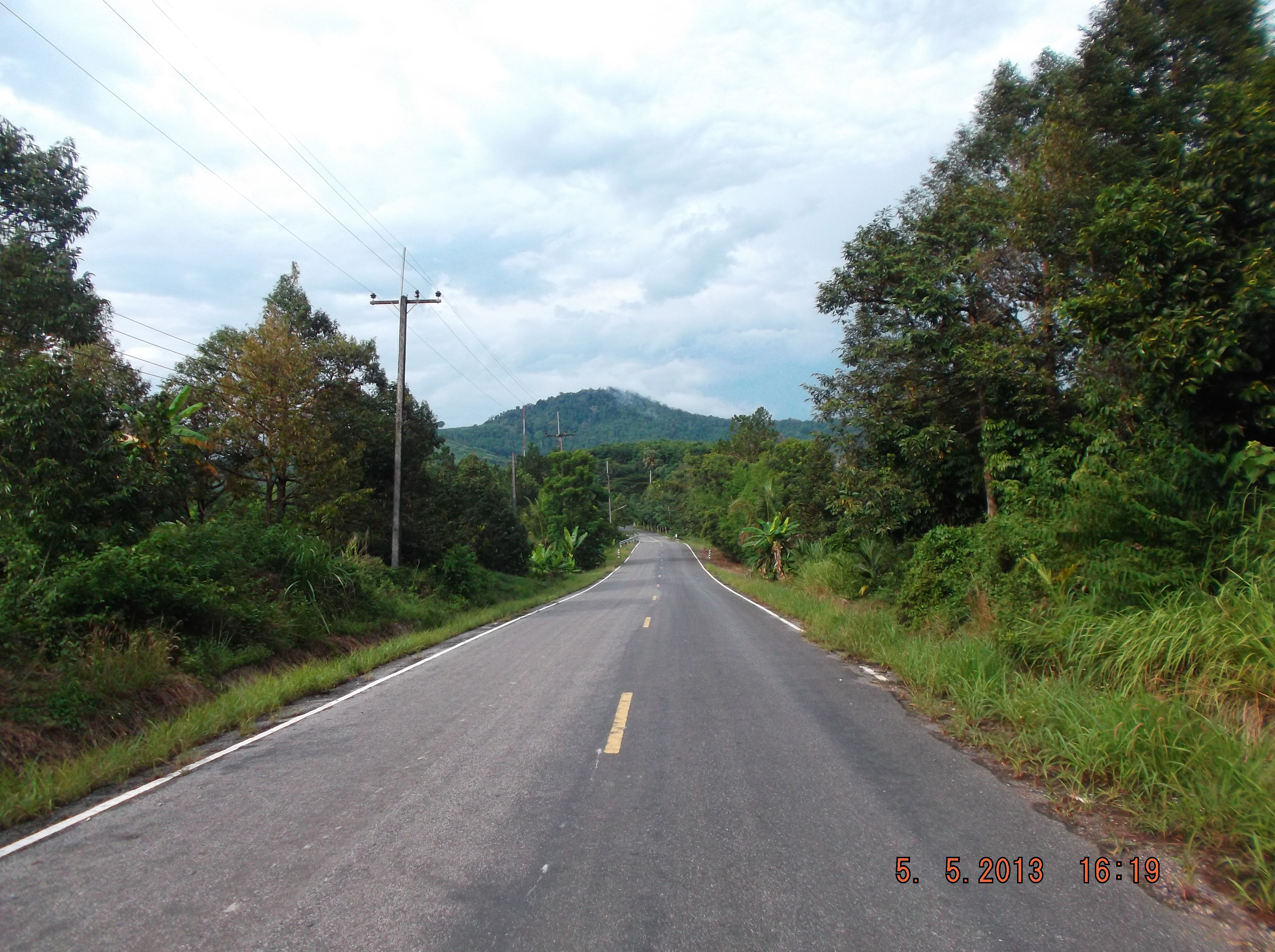
- Ban Wang Dab, a village in Ang Khiri sub-district

- District location in Chanthaburi province
- Coordinates: 12°40′25″N 102°11′48″E
- Country: Thailand
- Province: Chanthaburi

Area
  - Total: 480.1 km^{2} (185.4 sq mi)

Population (2023)
  - Total: 32,737
  - Density: 68.19/km^{2} (176.6/sq mi)
- Time zone: UTC+7 (ICT)
- Postal code: 22150
- Geocode: 2205

Makham (Thai: มะขาม, pronounced [mā.kʰǎːm]) is a district (amphoe) in the centre of Chanthaburi province, eastern Thailand.

== History ==
The district was established in 1899, then named Tha Luang District. It dates back to an ancient Khmer city, which was under Thai rule since the Ayutthaya era. In 1917, it was renamed Makham.

== Geography ==
Neighboring districts are (from the southwest clockwise) Mueang Chanthaburi, Khao Khitchakut, Pong Nam Ron, and Khlung of Chanthaburi Province.

The important water resource of the town and the province is the Chanthaburi River.

== Administration ==
The district is divided into six sub-districts (tambons), which are further subdivided into 59 villages (mubans). Makham is a sub-district municipality (thesaban tambon) which covers parts of tambon Makham. There are a further six tambon administrative organizations (TAO).

No.	Name	Thai	Villages	Pop.
1.	Makham	มะขาม	10	7,879
2.	Tha Luang	ท่าหลวง	8	2,328
3.	Patthawi	ปัถวี	12	6,884
4.	Wang Saem	วังแซ้ม	12	4,018
6.	Chaman	ฉมัน	9	4,021
8.	Ang Khiri	อ่างคีรี	8	4,916

Missing numbers are tambon which now form Khao Khitchakut District.
