= Chanthaburi province =

Coordinates: 12°36′37″N 102°06′10″E

Chanthaburi จันทบุรี
- Province
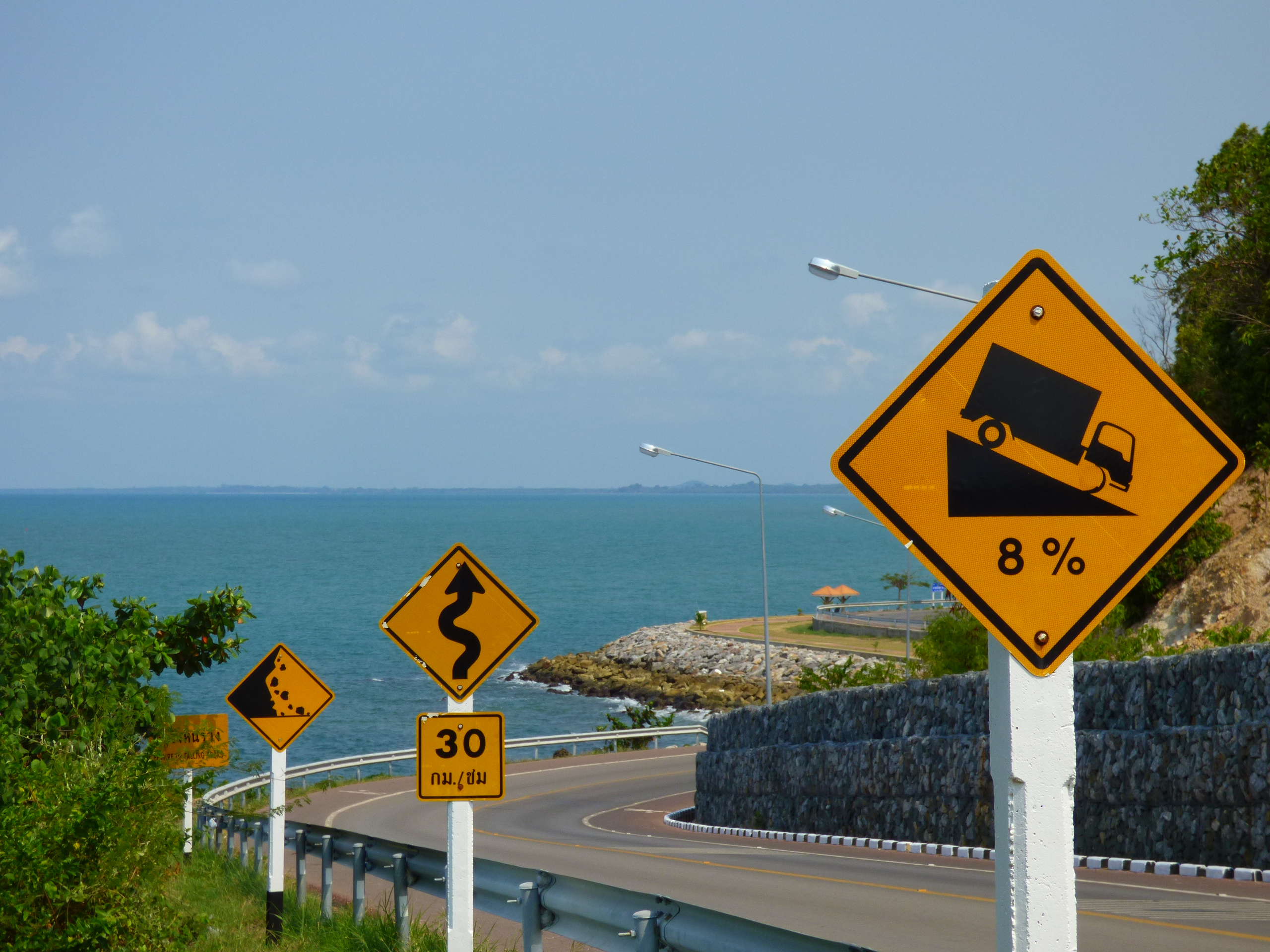
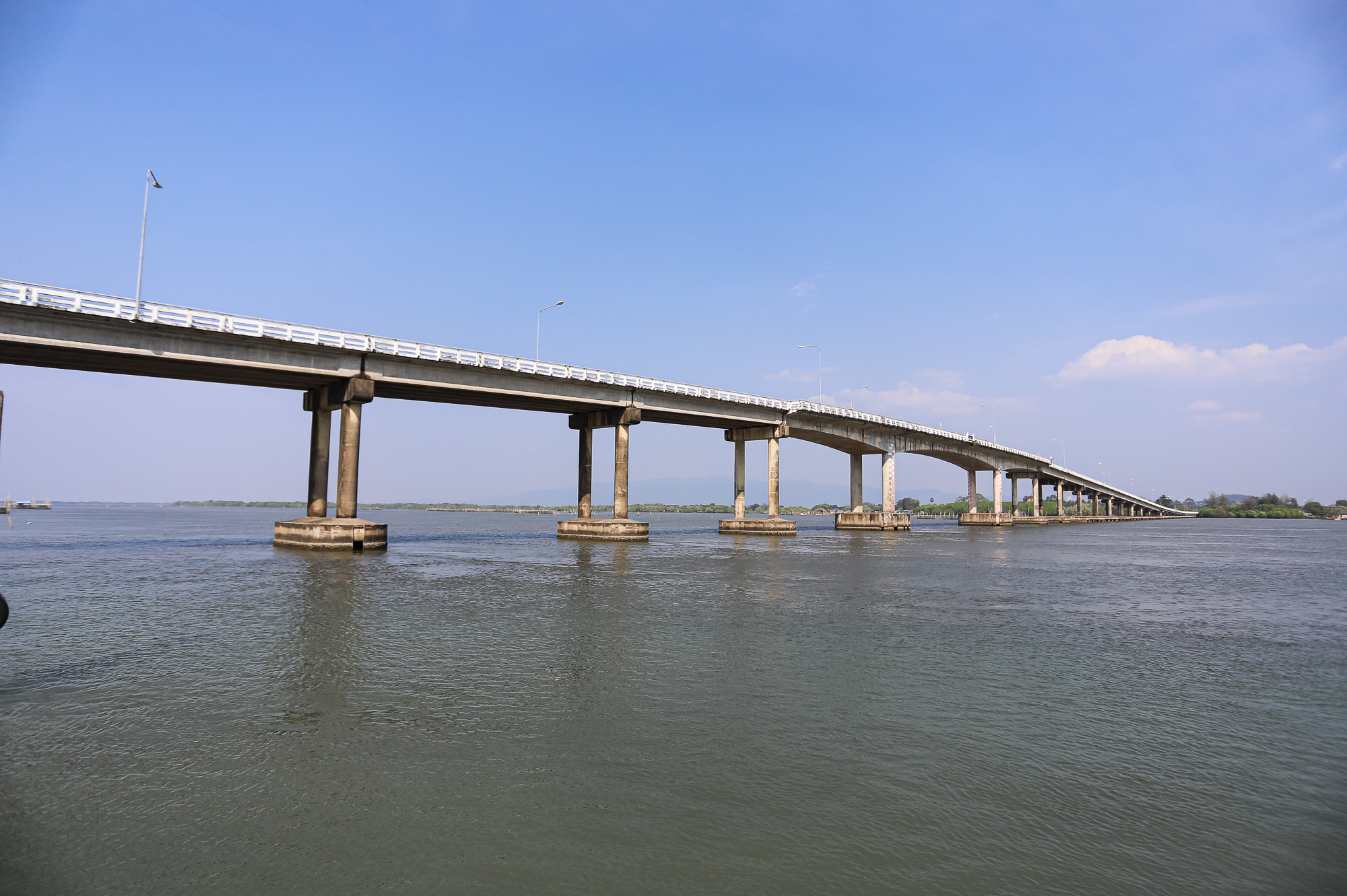
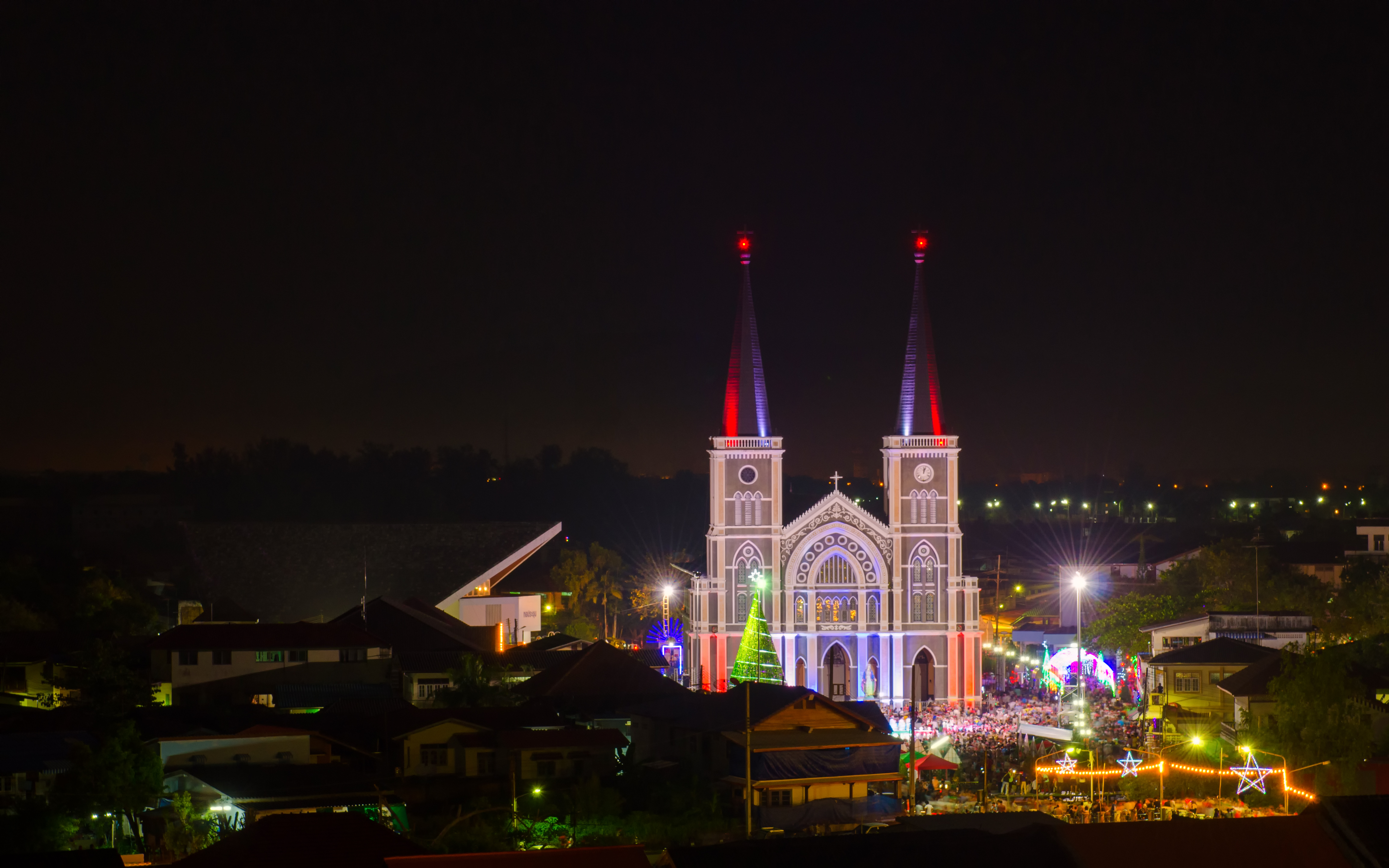
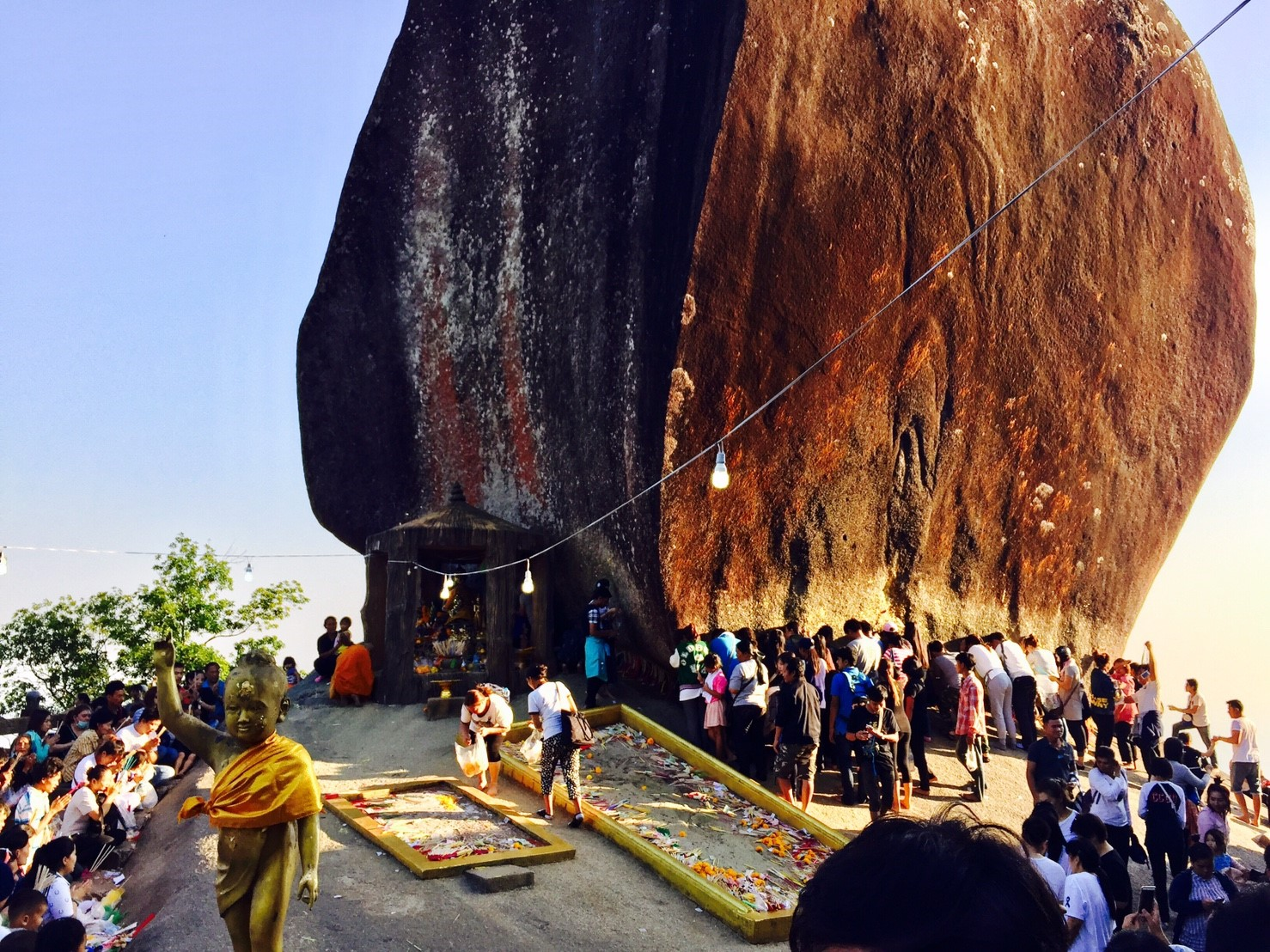
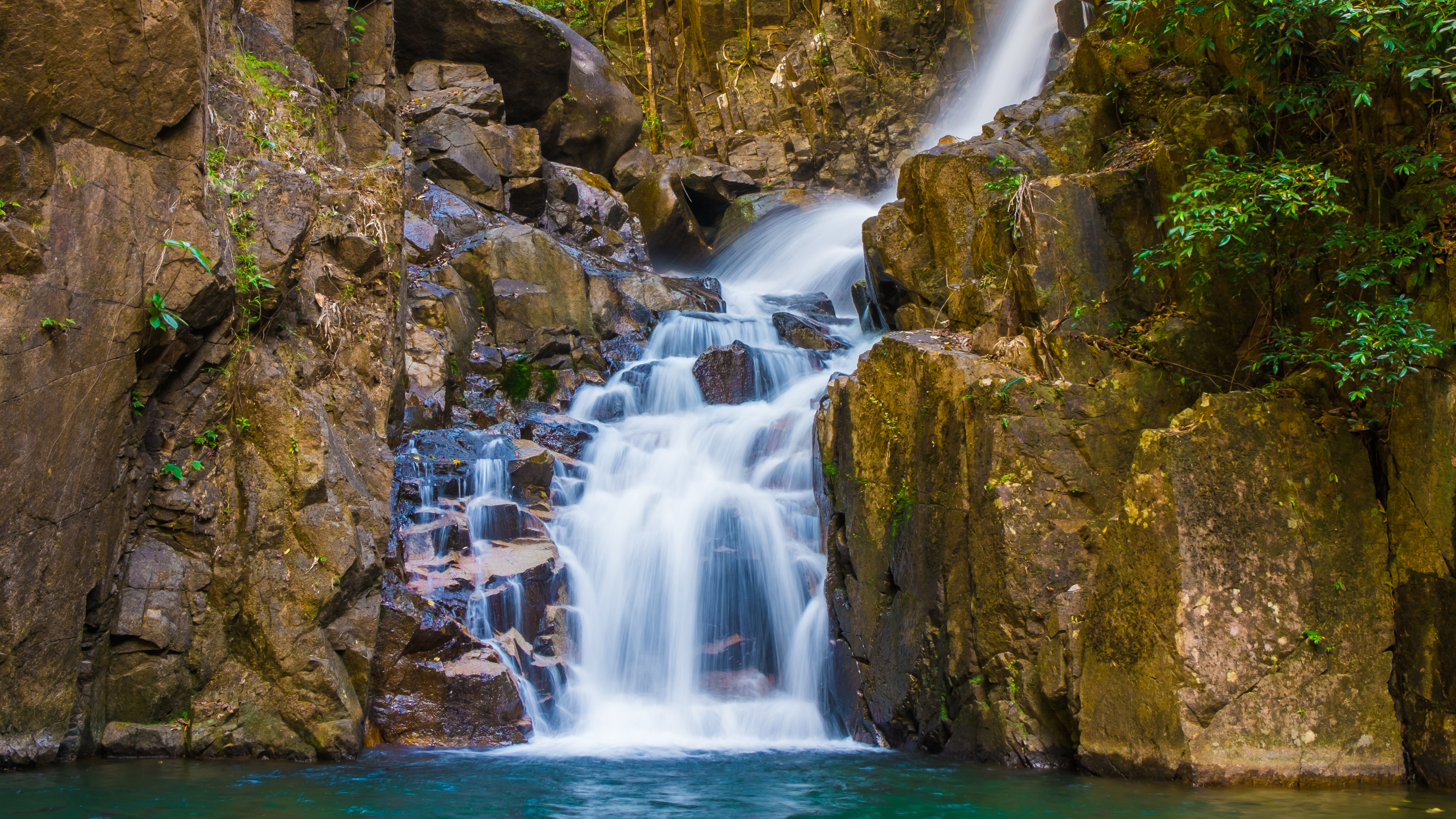
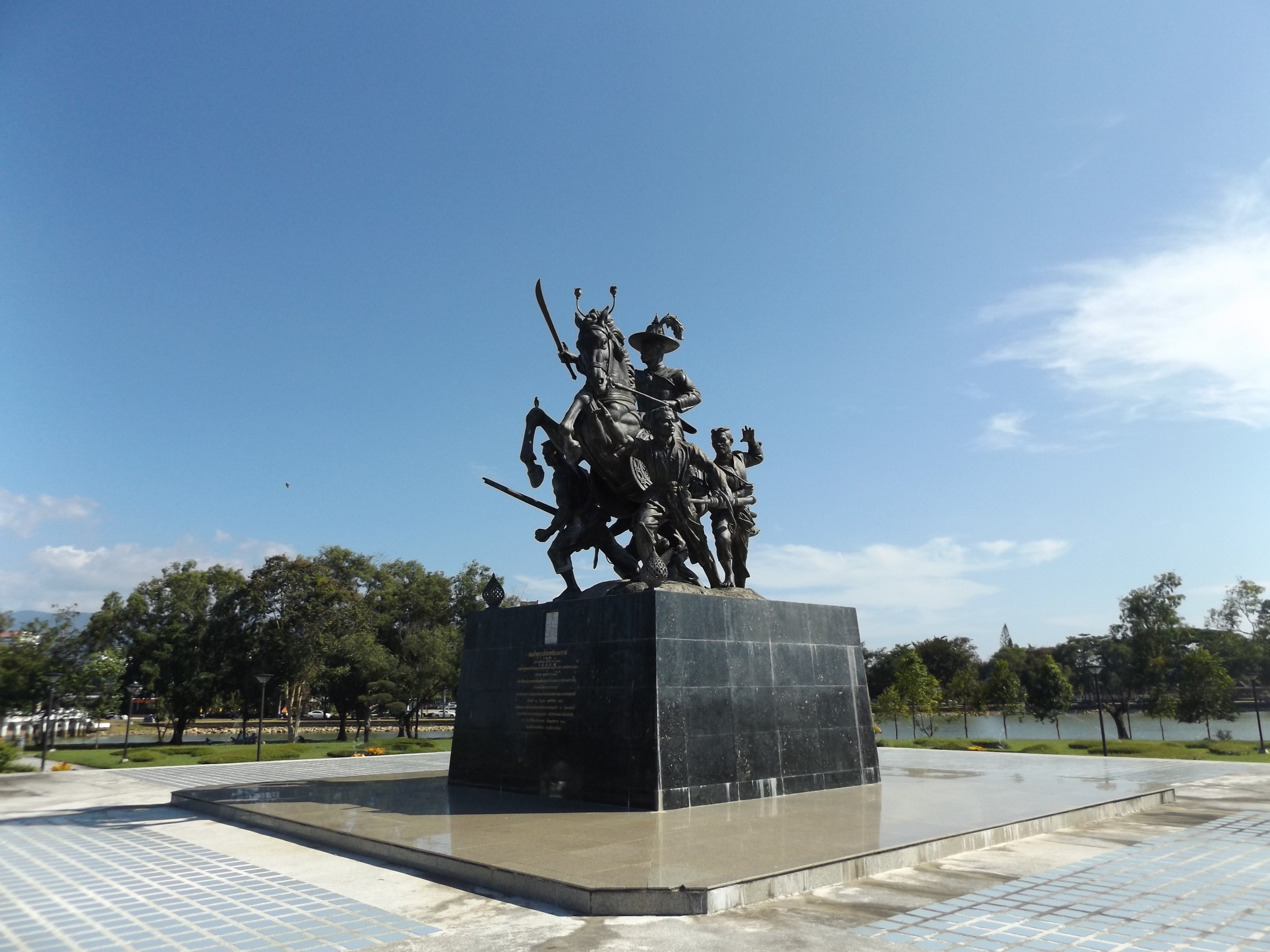
- From top: Noen Nang Phaya, viewpoint of Chaloem Burapha Chonlathit Road, Na Yai Am; Taksin Maharat Bridge crosses the Chanthaburi River at Laem Sing; Cathedral of the Immaculate Conception in Christmas Eve; Sacred balancing rock and Buddha footprint on the top of Mount Khitchakut; Phlio Waterfall; Monument of King Taksin at Thung Na Choei Public Park

- Flag Seal
- Nicknames: Mueang Chan (Thai: เมืองจันท์); Chanthabun (Thai: จันทบูร)
- Mottoes: "น้ำตกลือเลื่อง เมืองผลไม้ พริกไทยพันธุ์ดี อัญมณีมากเหลือ เสื่อจันทบูร สมบูรณ์ธรรมชาติ สมเด็จพระเจ้าตากสินมหาราช รวมญาติกู้ชาติที่จันทบุรี" ("Renowned waterfalls. Town of fruit. Good pepper. Bountiful jewels. Chanthaboon Mats. Rich in nature. King Taksin the Great reunited the people and reclaimed our independence at Chanthaburi.")
- Map of Thailand highlighting Chanthaburi province
- Country: Thailand
- Capital: Chanthaburi

Government
  - Type: Province and Provincial Administrative Organization
  - Body: Chanthaburi Province and Chanthaburi Provincial Administrative Organization
  - Governor: Monsit Paisarntanawat
  - PAO Chief Executive: Thanaphon Kitkarn

Area
  - Total: 6,415 km^{2} (2,477 sq mi)
  - Rank: 33rd

Population (2024)
  - Total: ▼536,388
  - Rank: 48th
  - Density: 83/km^{2} (210/sq mi)
  - Rank: 58th

Human Achievement Index
  - HAI (2022): 0.6323 "somewhat low" Ranked 49th

GDP
  - Total: baht 138 billion (US$4.0 billion) (2019)
- Time zone: UTC+7 (ICT)
- Postal code: 22xxx
- Calling code: 039
- ISO 3166 code: TH-22
- Website: chanthaburi.go.th chan-pao.go.th

Chanthaburi (Thai: จันทบุรี, pronounced [tɕān.tʰá(ʔ).bū.rīː]; Chong: จันกะบูย chankabui, lit. 'Lady Chan, who wears a pan on her head') is one of seven provinces (changwat) in eastern Thailand, on the border with Battambang and Pailin of Cambodia, on the shore of the Gulf of Thailand. Neighbouring provinces are Trat in the east and Rayong, Chonburi, Chachoengsao, and Sa Kaeo to the west and north.

The coast carried a port well before the written record of the province begins, and two Sanskrit inscriptions of the seventh century have been recovered from Mueang Phaniet. The Chong are the indigenous people of the region, and a Vietnamese Catholic minority has settled in three waves since the 19th century. The province was once an important source of gemstones.

== History ==
The coast of the province carried a port long before the earliest period the written record of Chanthaburi otherwise reaches. O. W. Wolters identified Chanthabun, the older name of the provincial town, with the Po Ssu Lan of Chinese records of the early 13th century. On that reading the place was a port of the Gulf of Siam from the 7th to the 10th century, under the Sena family of Isanapura. Sherds from the Ban Bang Pun kilns of Suphan Buri, which made large stoneware in the Southern Song period of the 12th and 13th centuries, have been recovered at Pak Nam Khaem Nu. Songsiri leaves the port unlocated between two of the province's river mouths, Khaem Nu and the Chanthabun mouth at Laem Sing, and the jar found at Khaem Nu, which carries an inscription, is now kept at Wat Pak Nam Khaem Nu. A head from a Harihara sculpture, the composite of Śiva and Viṣṇu, is reported to have been found in the province and is now held in the Prachin Buri National Museum. It is the only sculpture of that deity Nicolas Revire records from Thailand, where Harihara is otherwise first named in the inscription K. 1155 of 796 CE.

Two Sanskrit inscriptions from Mueang Phaniet, K. 502 and K. 503, have been assigned to the reign of Isanavarman I of Chenla in the first half of the seventh century. K. 503 carries the name Candhrapura, which Patcharaporn Ngernkerd and colleagues read as the polity at that town. K. 502 was recovered in two fragments, at Wat Thong Thua and Wat Chai Chumphon in Mueang Chanthaburi district. With K. 447, reported from Wat Baset in Battambang, it traces a corridor running from Battambang through the Watthana Gap and the so-called Mahosot Route to the sea in this province. George Cœdès tied the Chanthaburi stone to Isanavarman I's reign, while Michael Vickery assigns it to the time of Jayavarman I, with the earlier king named retrospectively. Charles Higham has proposed that the overland route to the sea was used as an alternative to the restricted or second-hand access to coastal trade available to the inland polities. In Thai epigraphic numbering the two stones are Pch. 3 and Pch. 4, and Chaowanee Lekkla lists them among twenty-four inscriptions from Thailand and southern Laos referred to Zhēnlà. She gives the find-spot as Phaniat, also called Mueang Kawai, an excavated site with a laterite wall in Mueang Chanthaburi district, and puts it 419 km west of Sambor Prei Kuk by an overland route. In a survey of fifteen moated sites of eastern Thailand by Patcharaporn Ngernkerd and colleagues, Phaniet is the largest, measuring 2.41 km² within its moat. It is also the only one of their four central towns whose plan is rectangular rather than rounded at the corners. Prasat Phaniet stands inside the moat, and Śiva liṅgas of both Pre-Angkorian and Angkorian style are reported from the town. They treat it as an isolated southern centre, its associated material clustering around the town alone. They reject the mountain route westward to Si Mahosot as an early historic road, because almost no archaeological features lie along it. The inscription K. 479 is taken to show Angkorian authority reaching the town in the ninth century.

Wolters placed Po Ssu Lan as the south-eastern neighbour of Chen Li Fu, and made the identification while rejecting an older proposal, by G. E. Gerini, that derived the name Chen Li Fu itself from Candanapura, that is Chanthabun.

Two wrecks off the province carry cargoes of forest produce. The Bang Ka Chai wreck yielded sappan wood and ivory and is radiocarbon-dated to 1380 ± 50, the sappan cut into some two thousand pieces of not more than about two metres. Saiklang Jindasu reads the cargo as evidence of the overland trade in Lan Na forest products reaching the sea. Copper ingots with a datable ceramic cargo are reported from a wreck named Bang Krachai 2, one of three ingot wrecks in the gulf. Whether the two names denote one site has not been established here.

The indigenous people of the Chanthaburi region are the Chong. The Chong have lived in the area since the Ayutthaya Kingdom, and are thought to have been early inhabitants of Cambodia, possibly pre-dating the Khmer. In Chanthaburi province, the Chong predominantly inhabit the districts of Khao Khitchakut, Pong Nam Ron, and Makham.

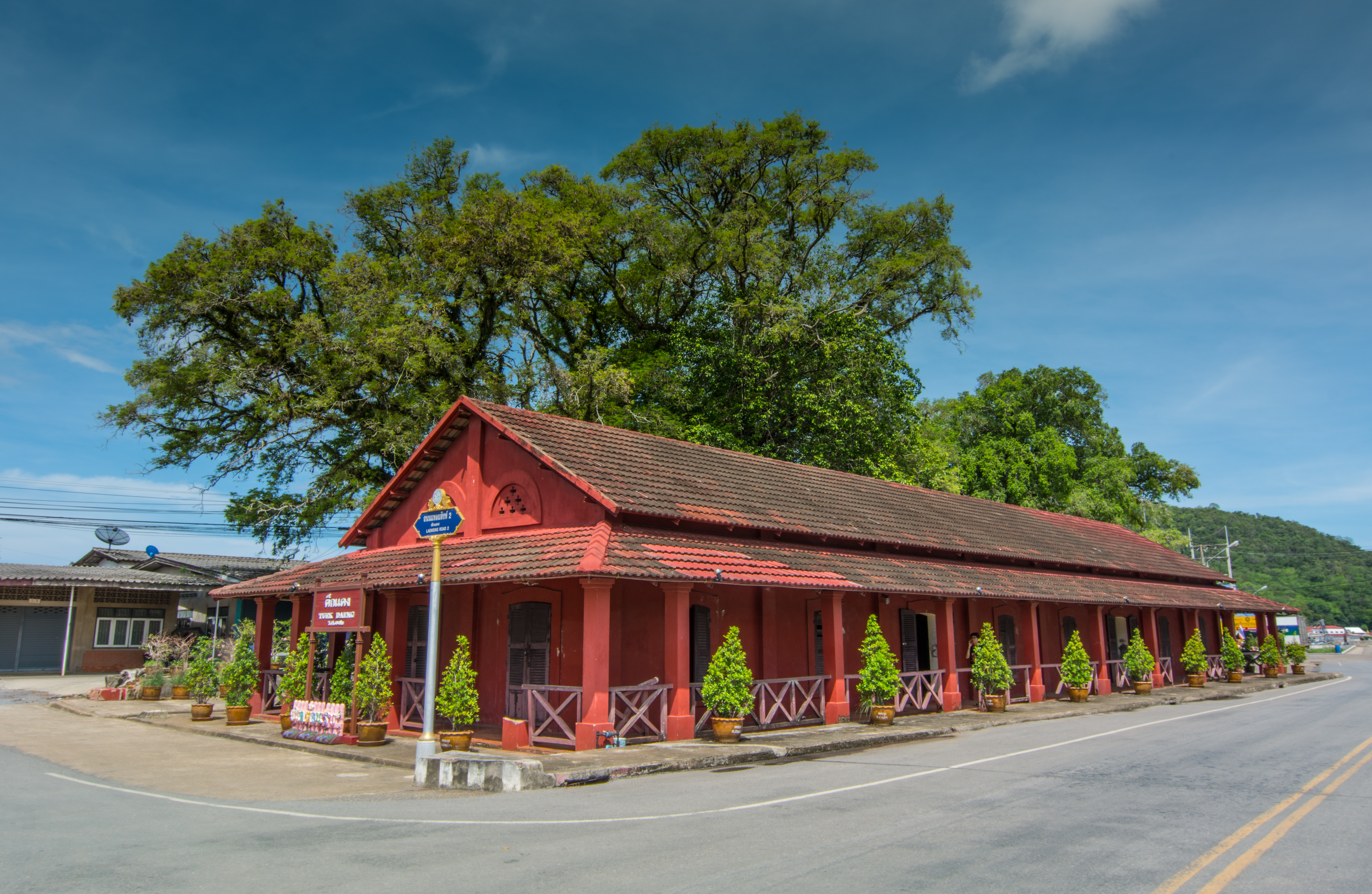
Tuek Daeng fort, built by French troops during the Paknam crisis

After the Paknam crisis in 1893, French colonial troops occupied Chanthaburi, returning it in 1905 when Thailand gave up ownership of the western part of Cambodia. A significant minority of Chanthaburi citizens are ethnic Vietnamese, who came in three waves. The first arrived in the 19th century during anti-Catholic persecutions in Cochin China, the second between the 1920s and the 1940s from French Indochina, and the third after the communist victory in Vietnam in 1975. The town of Chanthaburi has been the seat of a Bishop of Chanthaburi since 1944.

Chanthaburi once used to be an important source of gemstones, especially rubies and sapphires. While the Chantaboon Waterfront Community was developed over three centuries ago during the reign of King Narai along the banks of the River Mae Nam Chantaburi. It was an essential transportation and trade hub.

== Geography ==
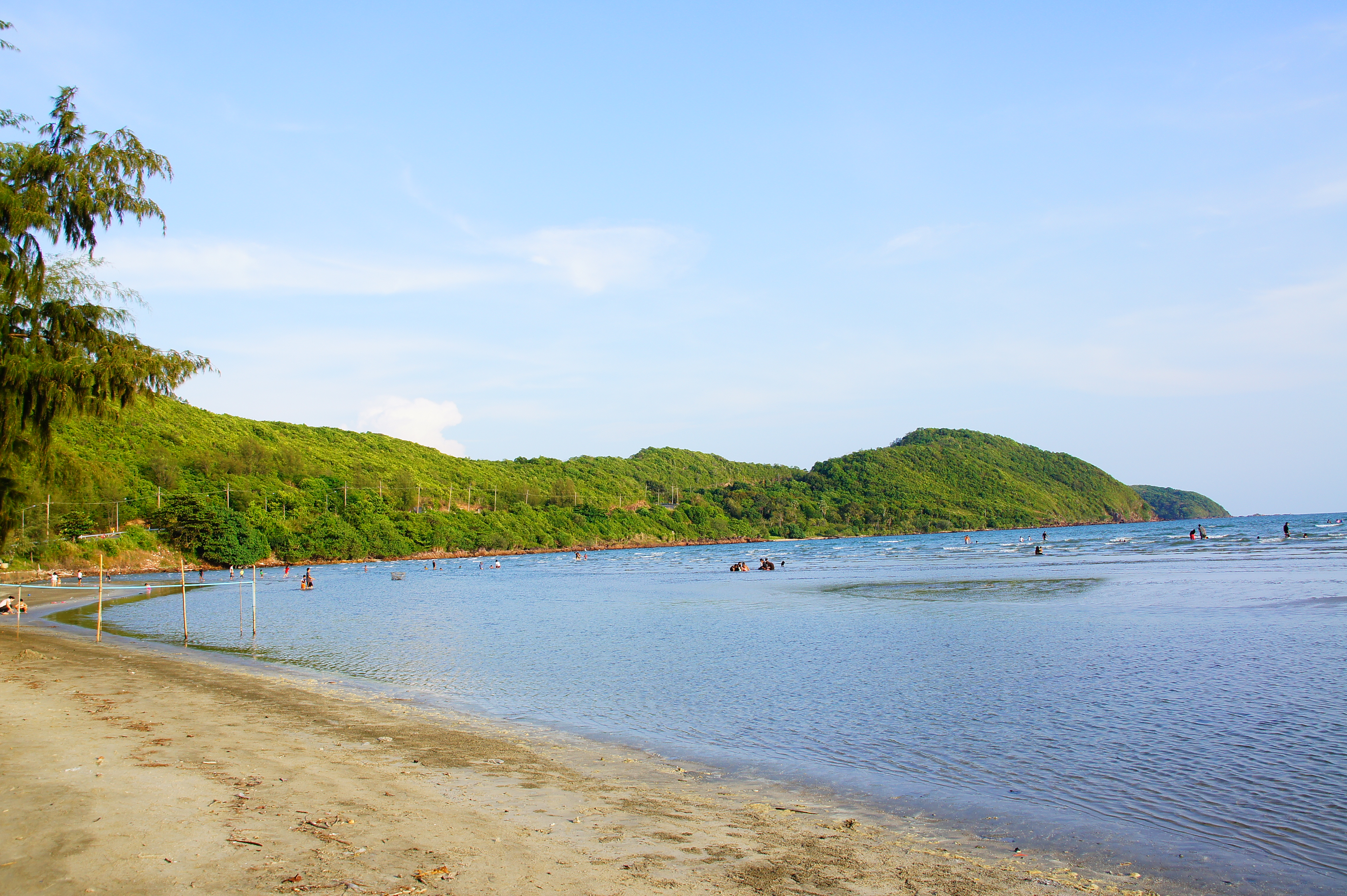
Hat Chao Lao, the famed and most beautiful beach in Chanthaburi

While the southern part of the province is on the shore of the Gulf of Thailand and thus is mostly coastal alluvial plains, the interior of the province is mountainous. The Chanthaburi Mountains in the north has the highest elevation in the province, the 1,675 m high Khao Soi Dao Tai peak. The main river of the province is the Chanthaburi River. The total forest area is 2,076 km^{2} (802 sq mi) or 32.4 percent of provincial area.
Together with the neighboring province, Trat, Chanthaburi is a center of gemstone mining, especially rubies and sapphires. Tropical fruits are also among the main products of the province. In 2000, it produced nearly 380,000 tonnes of durian, which was 45.57 percent of Thailand's durian production, approximately 27 percent of the entire world's production.

== Symbols ==
The provincial seal shows the moon surrounded by an aura. Inside the moon disc is a rabbit, as in Thai folklore the dark areas on the moon (maria) form the shape of a rabbit. The seal symbolizes the peace and tranquility of the province. The moon also refers to the meaning of the province, "City of Moon", from Chantha- (Thai: จันท-, lit. 'moon') and buri (Thai: บุรี, lit. 'city').

The flag of the province also shows the seal in the middle, a white rabbit on a yellow moon disc, on a blue disc. The background of the flag is red, with the name of province in yellow written below the seal.

The provincial tree is Diospyros decandra. The provincial flower is an orchid (Dendrobium friedericksianum). The brackish fish flagfin prawn goby (Mahidolia mystacina) is the provincial aquatic animal, what with Chanthaburi is the type locality.

The provincial slogan is "Renowned waterfalls. Town of fruit. Good pepper. Bountiful jewels. Chanthaboon Mats. Rich in nature. King Taksin the Great reunited the people and reclaimed our independence at Chanthaburi".

=== National parks ===
There area four national parks, along with three other national parks, make up region 2 (Si Racha) of Thailand's protected areas.(Visitors in fiscal year 2024)

Namtok Phlio National Park	135 km^{2} (52 sq mi)	(434,440)
Khao Sip Ha Chan National Park	118 km^{2} (46 sq mi)	(10,059)
Khao Chamao–Khao Wong National Park	84 km^{2} (32 sq mi)	(156,009)
Khao Khitchakut National Park	59 km^{2} (23 sq mi)	(582,744)

=== Wildlife sanctuaries ===
There are three wildlife sanctuaries, along with one other wildlife sanctuary, make up region 2 (Si Racha) of Thailand's protected areas.

Khao Ang Rue Nai Wildlife Sanctuary	1,079 km^{2} (417 sq mi)
Khao Soi Dao Wildlife Sanctuary	745 km^{2} (288 sq mi)
Khlong Kruea Wai Wildlife Sanctuary	265 km^{2} (102 sq mi)

Location protected areas of Chanthaburi

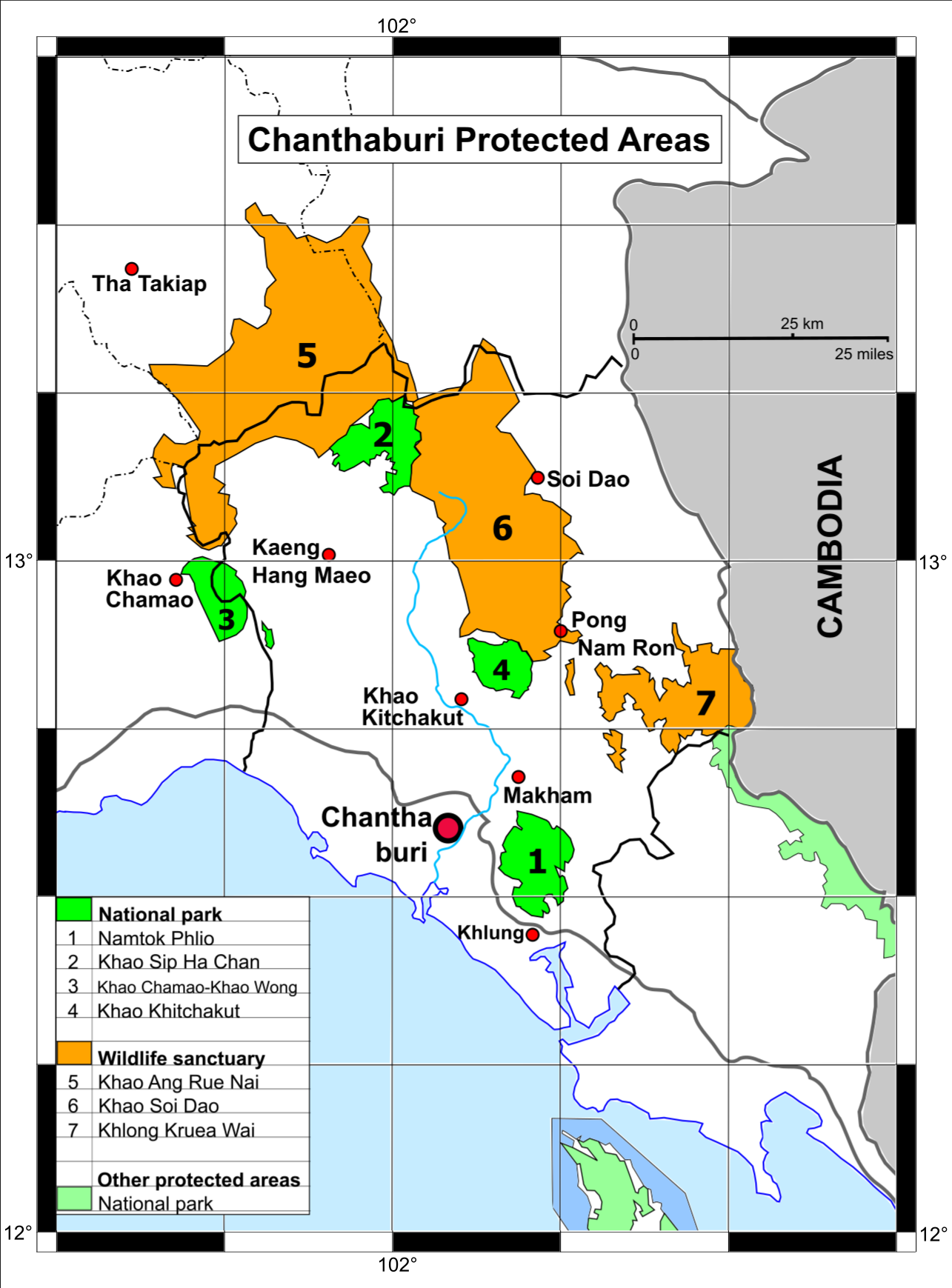
Chanthaburi protected areas

	National park
1	Namtok Phlio
2	Khao Sip Ha Chan
3	Khao Chamao-Khao Wong
4	Khao Khitchakut

	Wildlife sanctuary
5	Khao Ang Rue Nai
6	Khao Soi Dao
7	Khlong Kruea Wai

== Administrative divisions ==
Map of Chanthaburi with 10 districts

=== Provincial government ===
The province is divided into 10 districts (amphoes). These are further subdivided into 76 subdistricts (tambons) and 690 villages (mubans).

1. Mueang Chanthaburi
2. Khlung
3. Tha Mai
4. Pong Nam Ron
5. Makham
6. Laem Sing
7. Soi Dao
8. Kaeng Hang Maeo
9. Na Yai Am
10. Khao Khitchakut

=== Local government ===
As of 26 November 2019 there are: one Chanthaburi Provincial Administration Organisation (transl. th – transl. ongkan borihan suan changwat) and 47 municipal (thesaban) areas in the province. Chanthaburi, Chanthanimit, Khlung, Tha Chang and Tha Mai have town (thesaban mueang) status. Further 42 subdistrict municipalities (thesaban tambon). The non-municipal areas are administered by 34 Subdistrict Administrative Organisations - SAO (ongkan borihan suan tambon).

== Transportation ==
=== Roads ===
Highway 3 (Sukhumvit Road) passes near Chanthaburi and connects to Rayong, Pattaya, Chonburi, and Bangkok to the northwest and Trat to the southeast. Route 317 connects Chanthaburi to Sa Kaeo.

=== Air ===
There is no airport in Chanthaburi. The nearest airport is Trat Airport, 66 km from the center of Chanthaburi.

== Human achievement index 2022 ==
Health	Education	Employment	Income
63	27	45	29
Housing	Family	Transport	Participation
49	38	70	38
Province Chanthaburi, with an HAI 2022 value of 0.6323 is "somewhat low", occupies place 49 in the ranking.

Since 2003, United Nations Development Programme (UNDP) in Thailand has tracked progress on human development at sub-national level using the Human achievement index (HAI), a composite index covering all the eight key areas of human development. National Economic and Social Development Board (NESDB) has taken over this task since 2017.

Rank	Classification
1–13	"High"
14–29	"Somewhat high"
30–45	"Average"
46–61	"Somewhat low"
62–77	"Low"

Map with provinces and HAI 2022 rankings

== Health ==
Chanthaburi's main hospital is Prapokklao Hospital, operated by the Ministry of Public Health.

== Local food ==
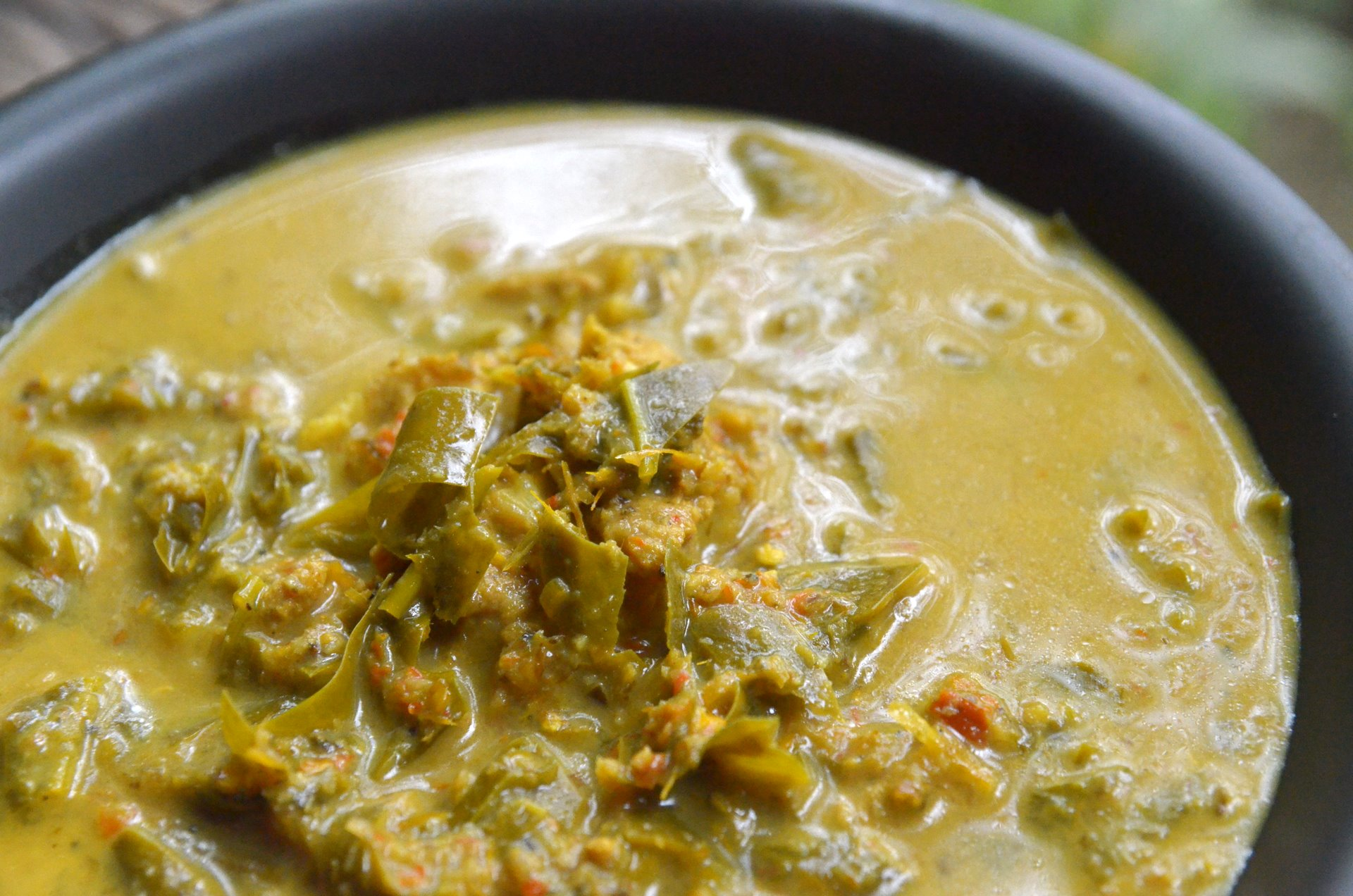
Mu chamuang

- Mu chamuang (หมูชะมวง): a curry is made from pork belly, herbs and sour grape apple shimba Chamuang (Garcinia cowa) leaves which is a popular dish of Chanthaburi and other provinces in eastern region.
- Kuaytiew mu liang (ก๋วยเตี๋ยวหมูเลียง): stewed pork noodles in Rĕw (Amomum villosum) herbal thicken soup which is unique local food.
- Khanom khuai ling (ขนมควยลิง): traditional dessert of Chanthaburi with a long history, its name literally means "monkey's dick snack".
- Kuaytiew sen chan pad pu (ก๋วยเตี๋ยวเส้นจันท์ผัดปู): a kind of Pad thai that uses Chanthaburi's rice noodles stir-fried with crab meat.
- Pathongko jim nam jim (ปาท่องโก๋จิ้มน้ำจิ้ม): Chinese deep-fried dough stick, or locally known as pathongko eaten with sweet and sour dipping sauce.
- Kaeng som bai sundan (แกงส้มใบสันดาน): a variation of Thai spicy and sour curry Kaeng som with leaves of a plant called Sundan (สันดาน, Cissus hastata), a species of liana. Selected by the Department of Cultural Promotion to be the provincial menu.
