= Khlung district =

Khlung ขลุง
- District
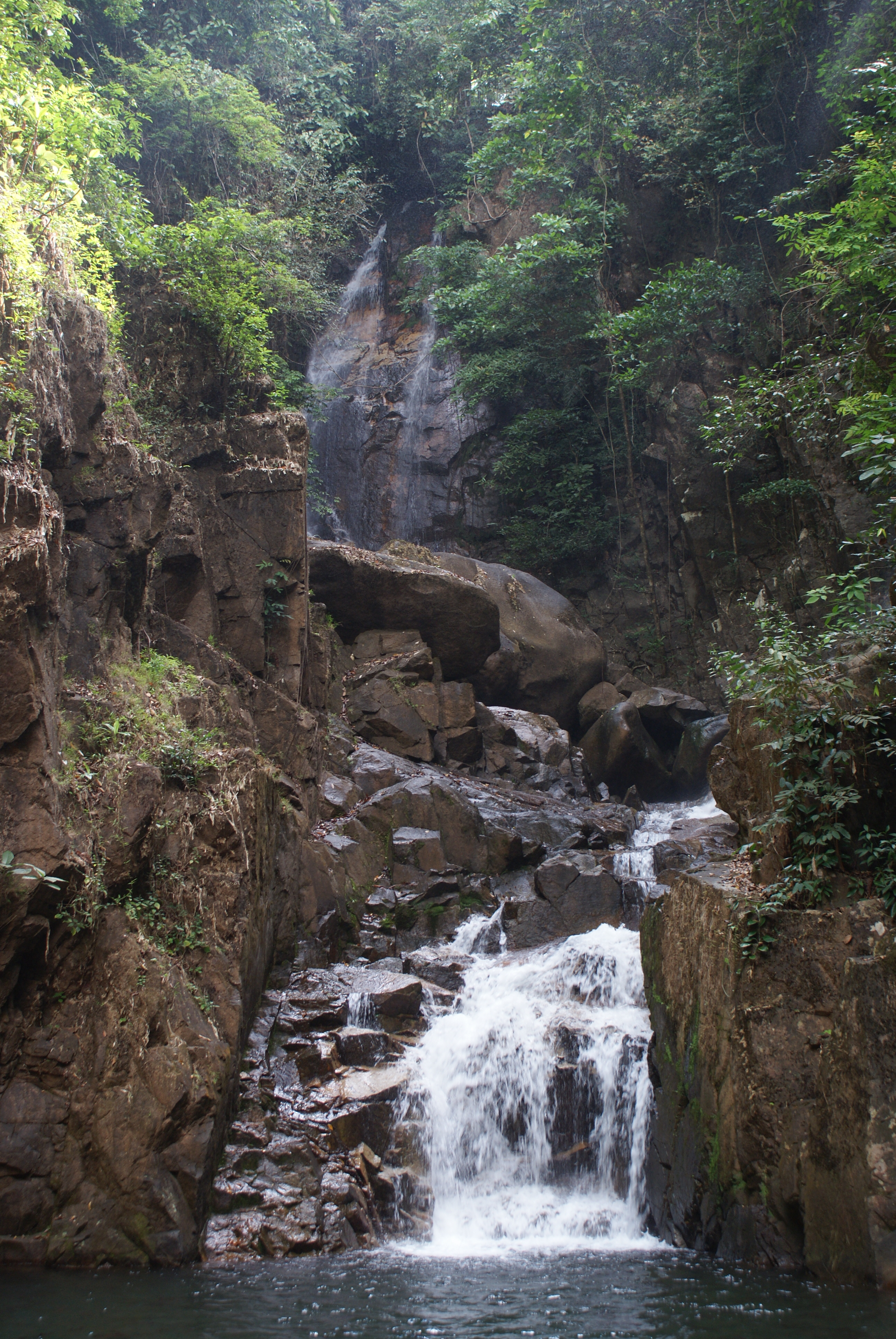
- Waterfall, Namtok Phlio National Park

- District location in Chanthaburi province
- Coordinates: 12°27′17″N 102°13′17″E
- Country: Thailand
- Province: Chanthaburi
- Seat: Khlung

Area
  - Total: 756.038 km^{2} (291.908 sq mi)

Population (2005)
  - Total: 55,044
  - Density: 72.8/km^{2} (189/sq mi)
- Time zone: UTC+7 (ICT)
- Postal code: 22110
- Geocode: 2202

Khlung (Thai: ขลุง, pronounced [kʰlǔŋ]) is the southernmost district (amphoe) of Chanthaburi province, eastern Thailand.

== Geography ==
Neighboring districts are (from the northwest clockwise) Laem Sing, Mueang Chanthaburi, Makham, and Pong Nam Ron in Chanthaburi Province, and Bo Rai, Khao Saming, and Laem Ngop in Trat province. To the southeast is the Gulf of Thailand.

Namtok Phlio National Park is located in Mueang, Laem Sing, Khlung and Makham districts.

== Administration ==
The district is divided into 12 sub-districts (tambons), which are further subdivided into 90 villages (mubans). Khlung is a town (thesaban mueang) which covers tambon Khlung. There are a further 11 tambon administrative organizations (TAO).

No.	Name	Thai name	Villages	Pop.
1.	Khlung	ขลุง	-	11,259
2.	Bo	บ่อ	10	6,715
3.	Kwian Hak	เกวียนหัก	10	4,400
4.	Tapon	ตะปอน	6	3,274
5.	Bang Chan	บางชัน	6	3,735
6.	Wan Yao	วันยาว	8	5,346
7.	Sueng	ซึ้ง	11	4,830
8.	Map Phai	มาบไพ	6	2,350
9.	Wang Sappharot	วังสรรพรส	9	2,859
10.	Trok Nong	ตรอกนอง	6	2,358
11.	Tok Phrom	ตกพรม	11	3,844
12.	Bo Wen	บ่อเวฬุ	7	4,074
