= Lawrence Thienchai Samanchit =

Thai Roman Catholic bishop (born 1931)

The Most Reverend Lawrence Thienchai Samanchit
- Bishop Emeritus of Chanthaburi
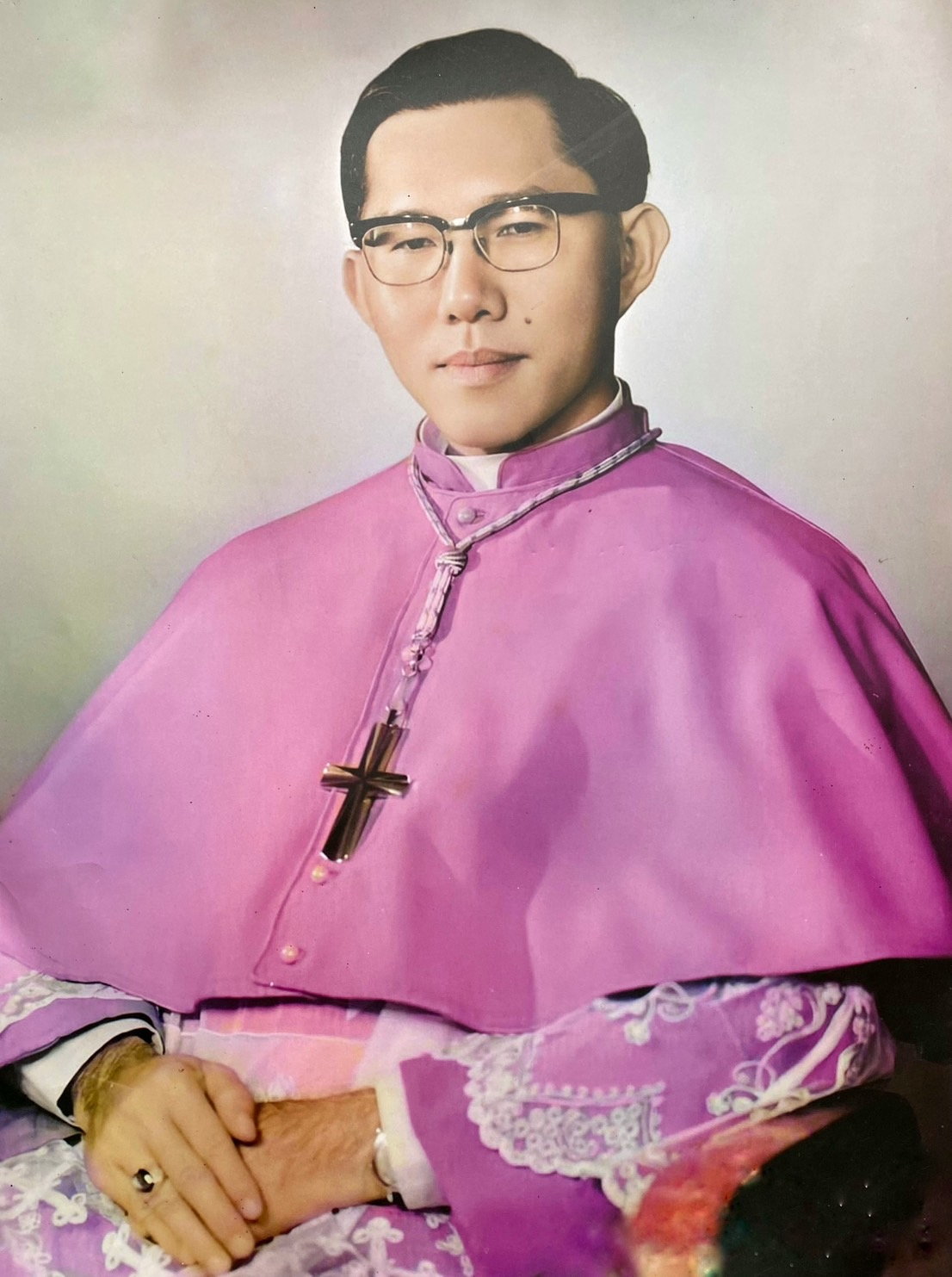
- Native name: ลอเรนซ์ เทียนชัย สมานจิต
- Church: Catholic Church
- Diocese: Diocese of Chanthaburi
- Appointed: 3 July 1971
- Term ended: 4 April 2009
- Predecessor: Francis Xavier Sanguon Souvannasri
- Successor: Silvio Siripong Charatsri

Orders
- Ordination: 29 January 1959
- Consecration: 3 October 1971

Personal details
- Born: 28 November 1931 (age 94) Ban Huaphai, Chonburi Province, Kingdom of Siam
- Motto: ขอให้ทุกคนเป็นหนึ่งเดียวกัน (May all be one)

Lawrence Thienchai Samanchit (Thai: ลอเรนซ์ เทียนชัย สมานจิต; born 28 November 1931) is a Thai Roman Catholic prelate, who served as Bishop of the Diocese of Chanthaburi from 1971 until his retirement in 2009.

== Early life, education and priesthood ==
Samanchit was born on 28 November 1931 in Ban Huaphai, Chonburi Province, Thailand, at the Catholic family of Chinese descent and was baptized on 29 November 1931. He received his early education at Saint Philip-Jacob School and continued his studies at Darasamut School.

After completing his secondary education, he entered the minor seminary and later continued his philosophical and theological studies at the major seminary in Thailand in preparation for the priesthood. He was ordained to the priesthood on 29 January 1959 for the Diocese of Chanthaburi.

== Episcopal ministry ==
On 3 July 1971 he was appointed Bishop of Chanthaburi by Pope Paul VI. He received episcopal consecration on 3 October 1971.

During his episcopal ministry, Samanchit addressed various social and pastoral concerns in Thailand. In interviews and reports, he spoke about interreligious dialogue in southern Thailand and emphasized peaceful relations among religious communities. He also commented publicly on issues affecting Christian women in Thai society.

== Retirement ==
On 4 April 2009, Pope Benedict XVI accepted his resignation from the pastoral governance of the Diocese of Chanthaburi in accordance with Code of Canon Law. He was succeeded by Silvio Siripong Charatsri.
