= Cathedral of the Immaculate Conception, Chanthaburi =

Coordinates: 12.6093°N 102.1186°E

Cathedral of the Immaculate Conception
- อาสนวิหารพระนางมารีอาปฏิสนธินิรมล
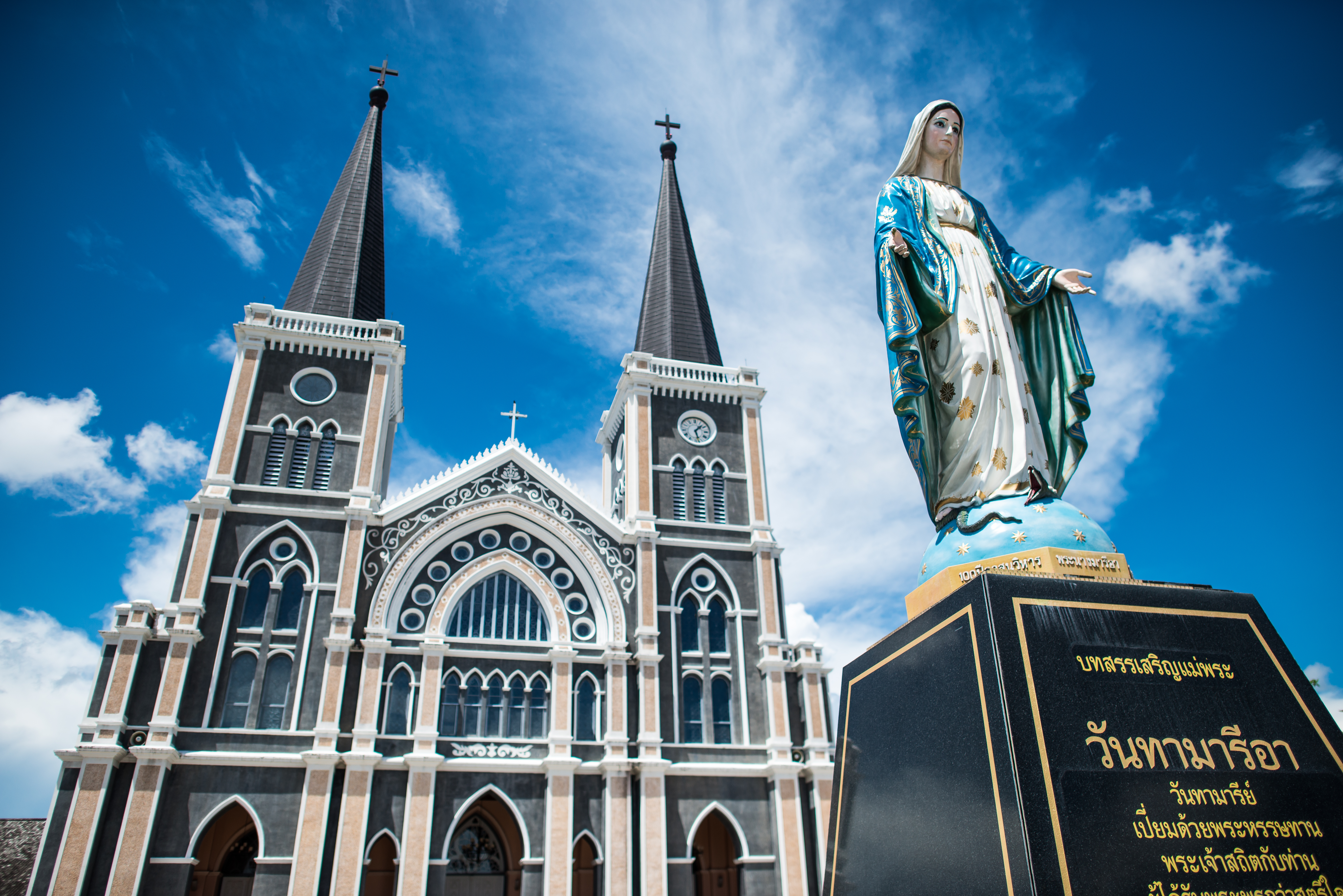

- Location within Thailand
- Location: 110 Moo 5, Santisuk Road, Chanthanimit Subdistrict Mueang District Chanthaburi Province
- Country: Thailand
- Denomination: Latin Church

History
- Consecrated: 10 January 1909

Architecture
- Years built: 1694; 11 December 2009 (place the spire part)

Specifications
- Length: 60 m (200 ft)
- Width: 20 m (66 ft)

Administration
- Diocese: Diocese of Chanthaburi

Clergy
- Rector: Reverend Adisak Phonngam

The Cathedral of the Immaculate Conception (Thai: อาสนวิหารพระนางมารีอาปฏิสนธินิรมล) is a Catholic church located in the city of Chanthaburi, in the province of the same name, in Thailand. It is "the most famous and picturesque building of Chanthaburi" and the witness of French presence in the city.

== History ==
The cathedral of the Immaculate Conception is the fourth church built on the spot by the Catholic community in Chanthaburi. The first Catholic community followed the Siamese in exile after the fall of Ayutthaya in 1767.

In 1901, the Christians belonging to Chanthaburi numbered 2,500; in 1904, helped by his vicars, a French missionary, Father Augustin Peyrical began the construction of a new church. On the death of Father Quentric, Father Peyrical was appointed parish priest of Banpeng, the deceased having given him by will a part of his inheritance to build the new church in Chanthabury. Due to disagreements with Msgr. Jean-Louis Vey, the apostolic vicar of Siam, who had views on this heritage, Father Peyrical did not go to Banpeng, but to Paris and Rome to defend his rights, and Rome agreed with him. Back in Siam in 1910, he was appointed parish priest of Chanthaburi by Mgr. René Perros. His district was faced with epidemics of cholera and plague in quick succession, but will hold firm. In 1921, Father Peyrical was appointed Apostolic Vicar of Laos, but he declined the honor and the office: it was Father Gouin who accepted. Despite the material difficulties in maintaining the schools, the number of Christians continued to increase and in 1928, Father Peyrical proceeded to bless a new church and a cemetery in Rayong. When Father Peyrical died on 3 September 1929, in Chanthaburi, he was buried in the cemetery next to his church, the largest in Thailand.

On 23 December 1945, Pope Pius XII erected the apostolic vicariate of Chanthaburi and therefore the church of the Immaculate Conception became a cathedral with a canonical chapter.

Since 1965, it serves as the Latin rite seat of the Diocese of Chanthaburi (Dioecesis Chanthaburiensis, สังฆมณฑล จันทบุรี) created with the Bull Qui in fastigio of Pope Paul VI. It is under the pastoral responsibility of the Bishop Silvio Siripong Charatsri.

== Architecture ==
The cathedral, visible from most of the city, was formally inaugurated in 1909 as one of the largest Catholic churches in Thailand. It was constructed in Gothic style during the 10 years of occupation by France.

The shape of the Cathedral with a central nave, two side alleys, a narthex, and twin spires is an exemplary form of neo-Gothic expression.

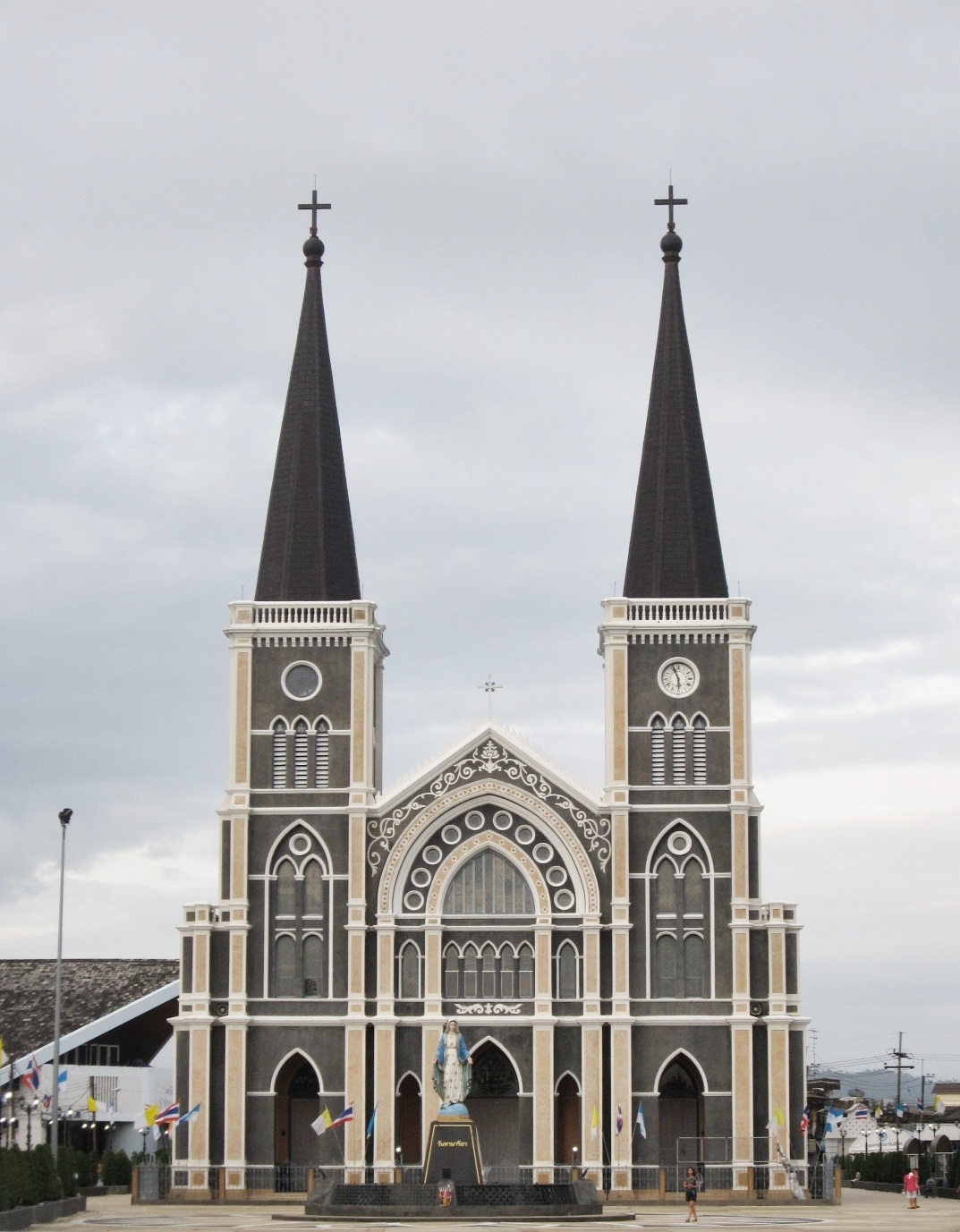
Front view

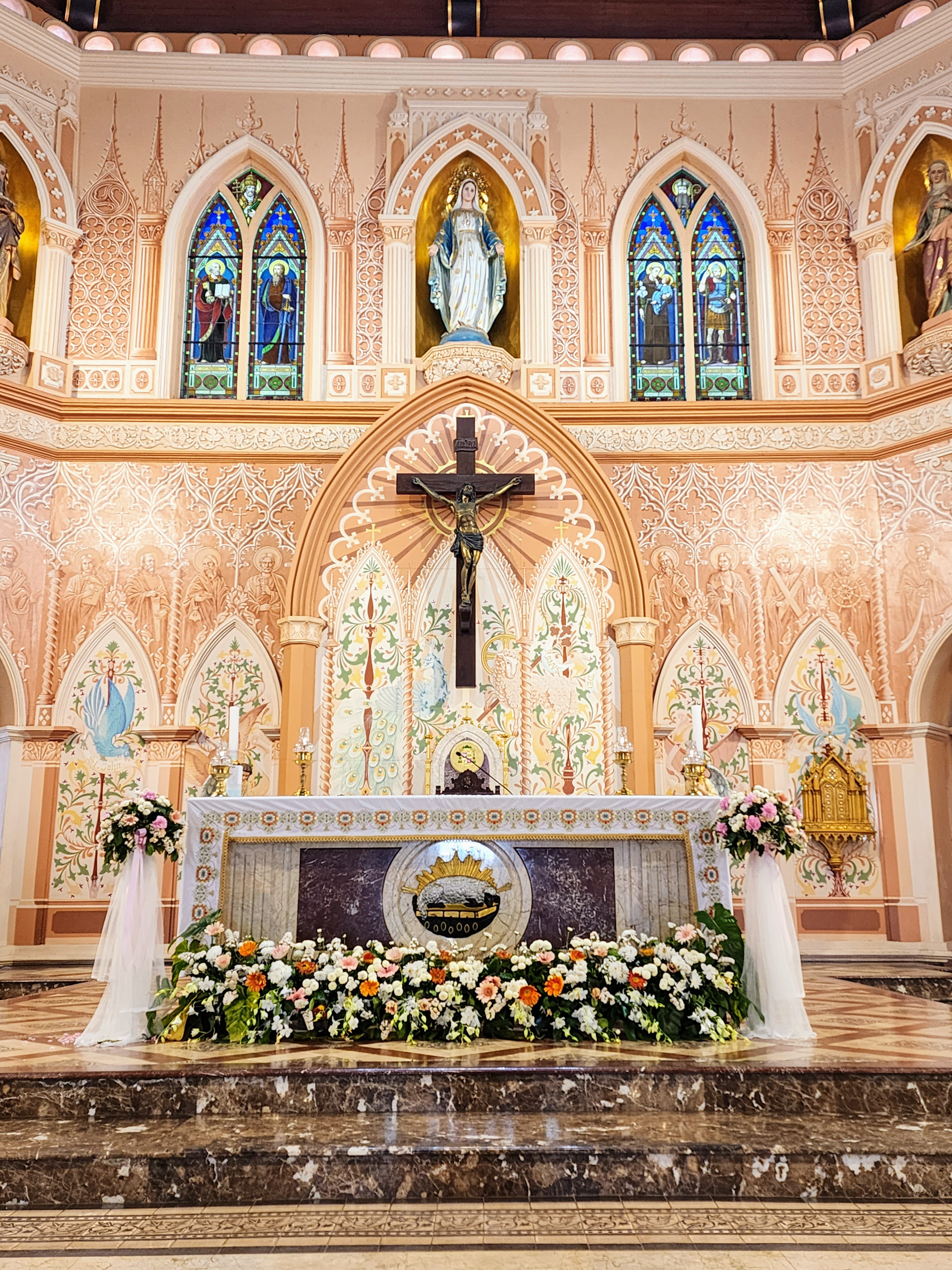
Main altar

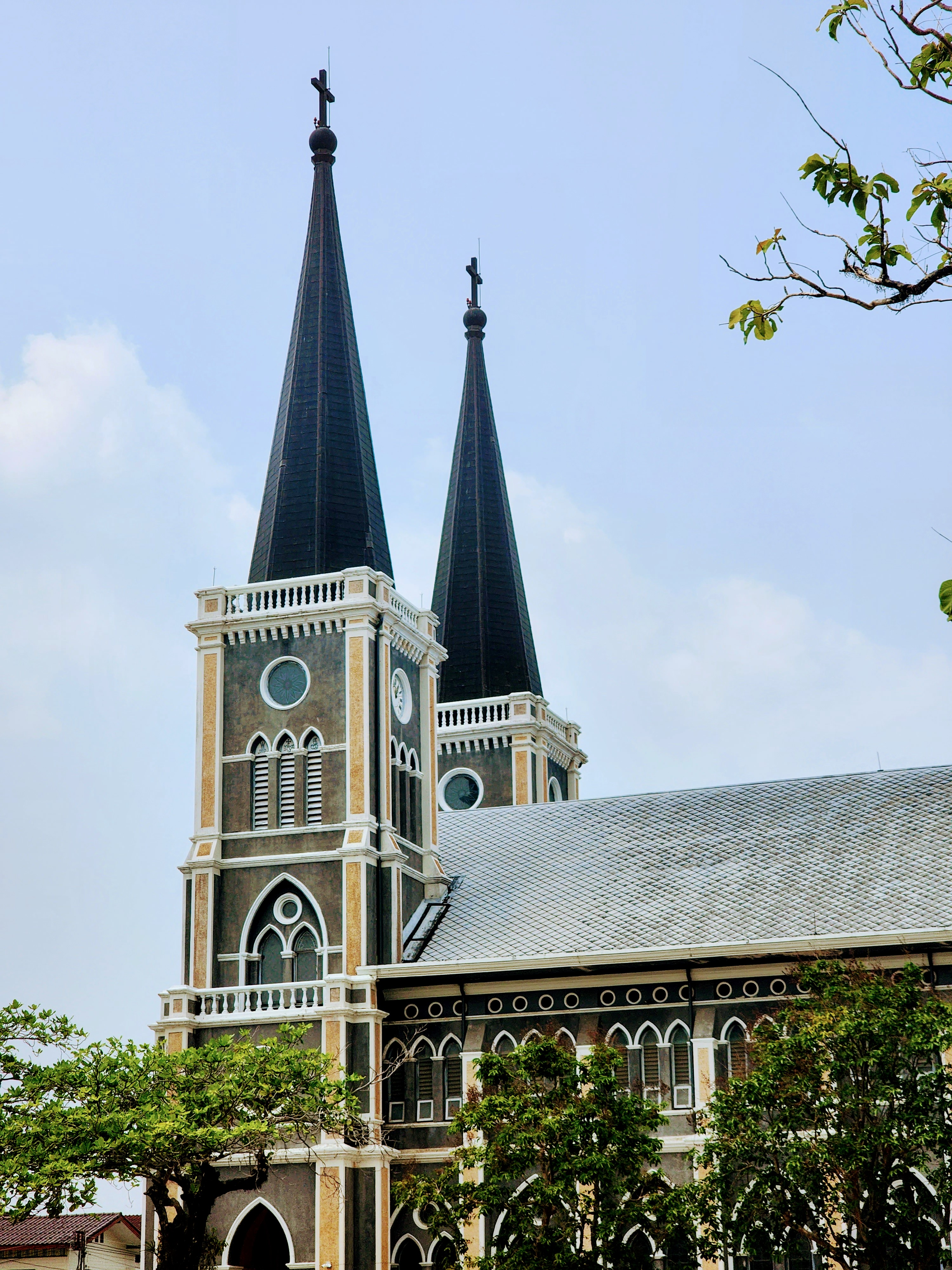
Side view

== Devotion ==
=== The influence of French and Vietnamese Catholic spirituality ===
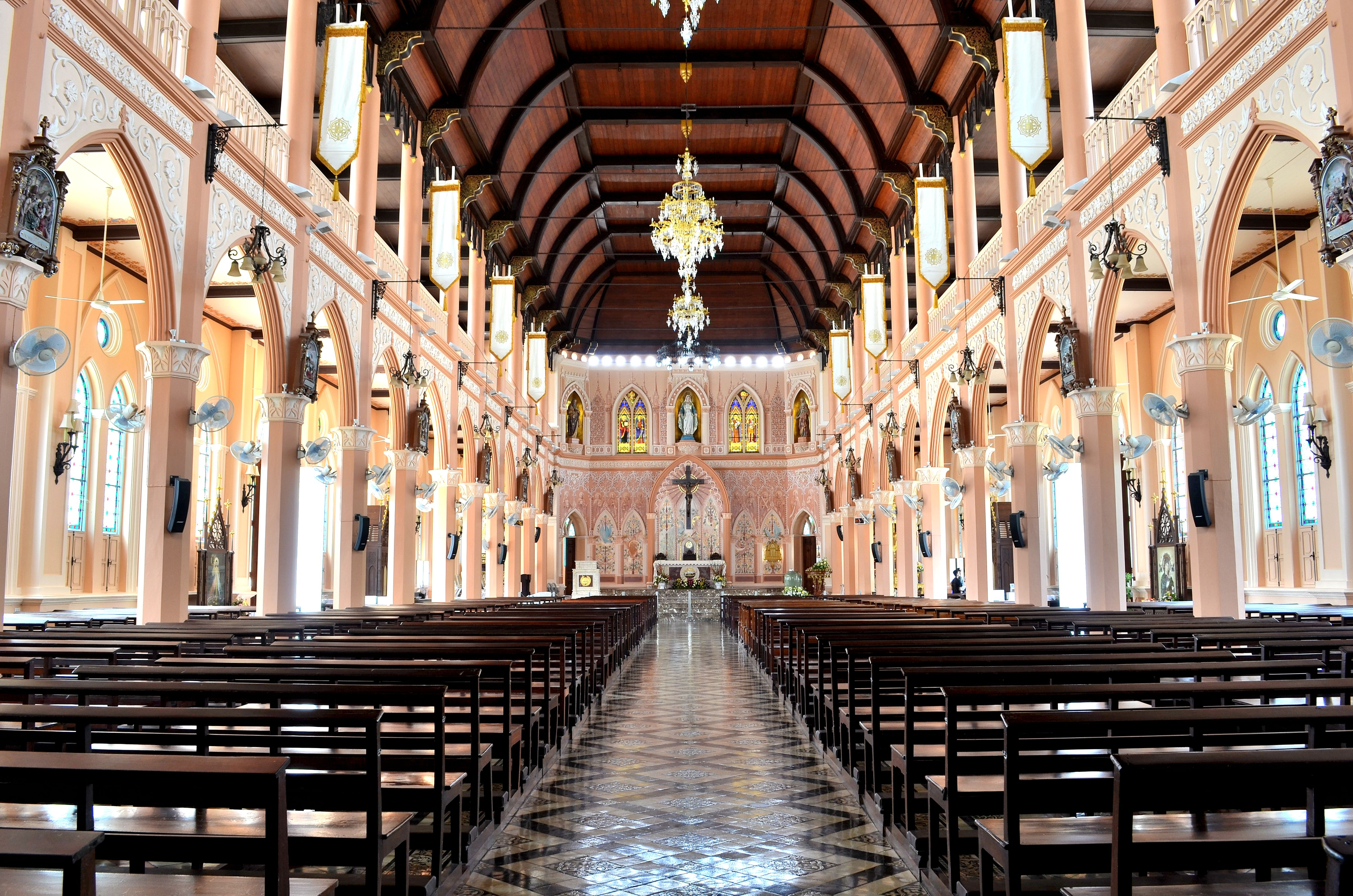
Central nave of the Cathedral

The French and Vietnamese influence is clearly visible in the Cathedral of the Immaculate Conception.

Stained glasses representing the French king Saint Louis as well as national hero Joan of Arc recall the French occupation of the city at the beginning of the twentieth century. Three other stained glasses in an oculus representing the blessed martyrs as Theophane Venard, Auguste Chapdelaine of the Paris Foreign Missions Society are a legacy of the French builders of this sanctuary.

The carved altars painted in red and gold are typical of Vietnamese Catholicism. The side altars devoted to the Sacred Heart and Saint Joseph are a reminder of the first Vietnamese Catholic community in Chanthaburi.

=== A Catholic hub for Thailand ===
The Cathedral of Chanthaburi has become a major for the Catholic Church in Thailand. Flanked by the bishop's residence as well as many Catholic schools and the Fatima House, i.e. the general house of the Lovers of the Cross of Chanthaburi, the cathedral is at the center of a diocese where the Catholic population reaches a national high for Thailand of around ten percent of the overall population.

=== A major shrine of Marian devotion ===
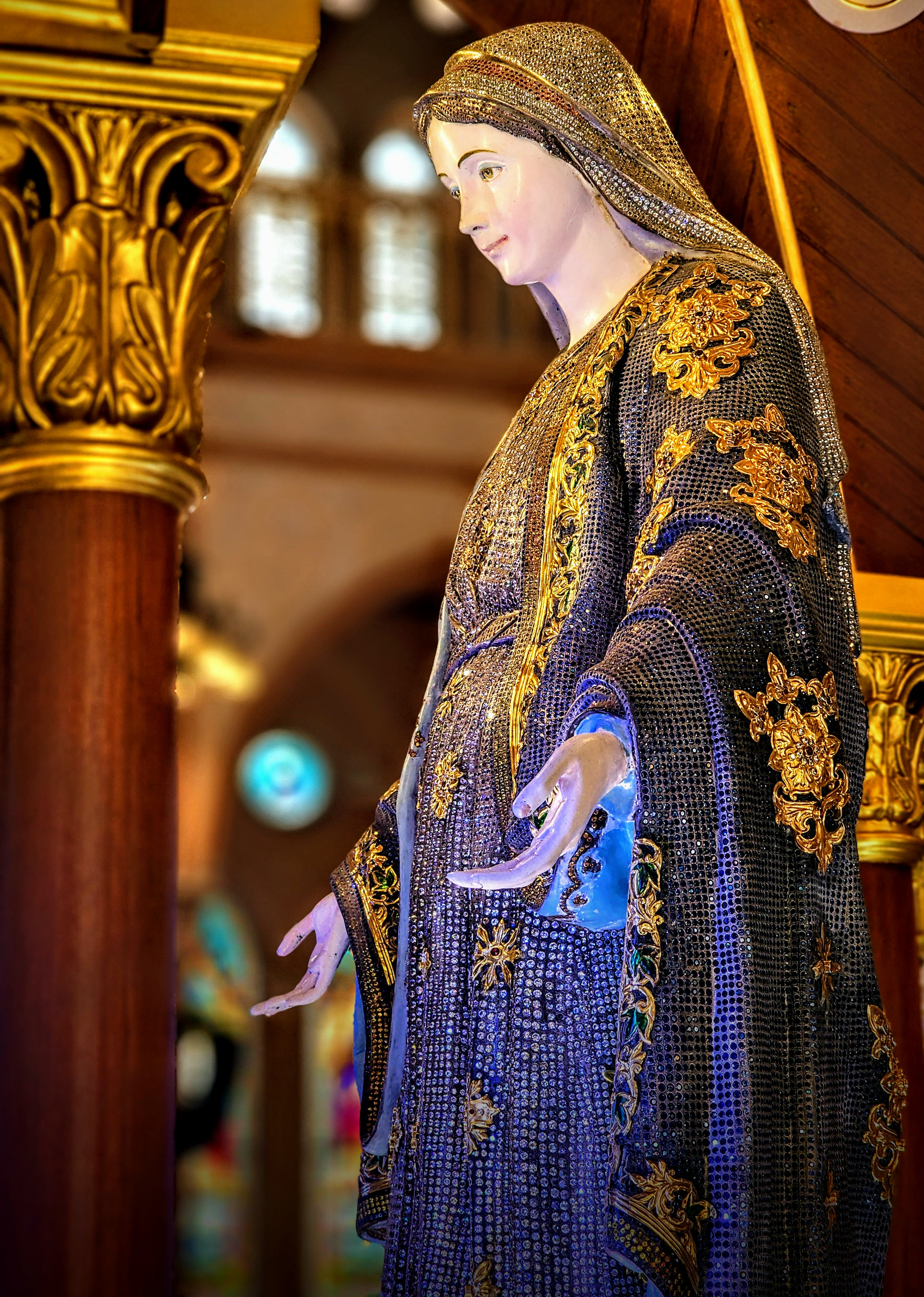
Sapphire-covered statue of the Virgin Mary in the Chanthaburi Cathedral.

The Cathedral, which is dedicated to the Immaculate Conception, is a unique expression of Thai Marian devotion.

There is a statue of the Virgin Mary in front of the Cathedral.

The centre piece of the inside of the cathedral is the statue of the Virgin Mary. It is covered by semi precious gems donated by the local congregation – estimates of the number of gems range from 200,000 to 500,000.

== See also ==
- Roman Catholicism in Thailand
