= Pong Nam Ron district =

Pong Nam Ron โป่งน้ำร้อน
- District
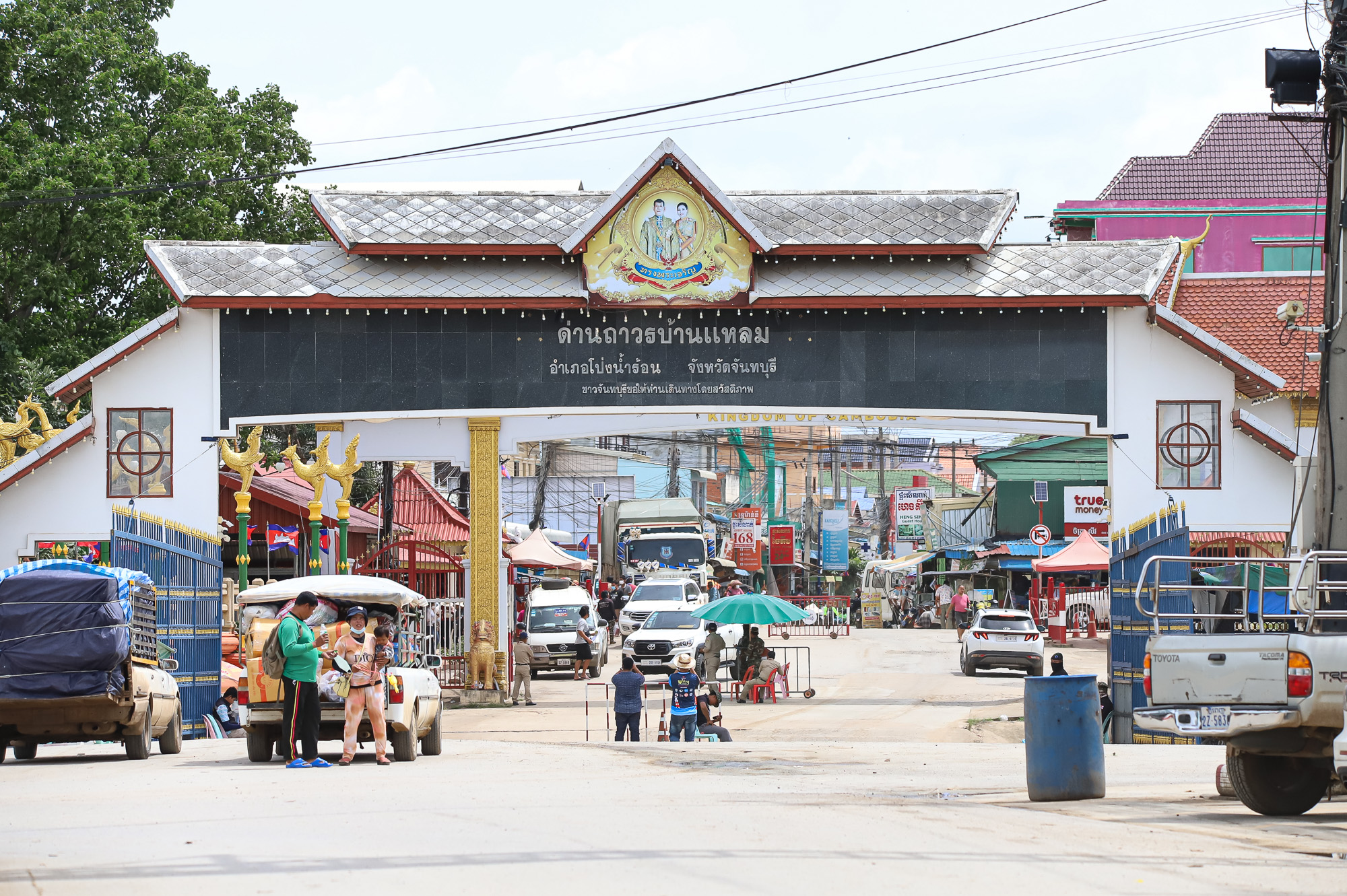
- Ban Laem checkpoint in 2022

- District location in Chanthaburi province
- Coordinates: 12°54′21″N 102°15′46″E
- Country: Thailand
- Province: Chanthaburi

Area
  - Total: 927.0 km^{2} (357.9 sq mi)

Population (2005)
  - Total: 38,115
  - Density: 41.1/km^{2} (106/sq mi)
- Time zone: UTC+7 (ICT)
- Postal code: 22140
- Geocode: 2204

Pong Nam Ron (Thai: โป่งน้ำร้อน, pronounced [pòːŋ ná(ː)m rɔ́ːn]) is the easternmost district (amphoe) of Chanthaburi province, eastern Thailand.

== Geography ==
Neighboring districts are (from the southwest clockwise) Khlung, Makham, Khao Khitchakut, and Soi Dao of Chanthaburi province. To the east are Pailin and Battambang of Cambodia.

== Border Crossings ==
There are two border crossings into Cambodia in Pong Nam Ron:

- Ban Phakkat (Thai: บ้านผักกาด) in Klong Yai sub-district. On the Cambodian side of the border is Phsar Prum in Sala Krau district, Pailin province.
- Ban Laem (Thai: บ้านแหลม) in Thep Nimit sub-district. On the Cambodian side of the border is Daun Lem in Kamrieng district, Battambang province.

== History ==
The minor district (king amphoe) Pong Nam Ron was upgraded to a full district on 25 July 1941.

== Administration ==
The district is divided into five sub-districts (tambons), which are further subdivided into 47 villages (mubans). Pong Nam Ron is a township (thesaban tambon) which covers parts of tambons Pong Nam Ron and Thap Sai. There are a further five tambon administrative organizations (TAO).

No.	Name	Thai name	Villages	Pop.
1.	Thap Sai	ทับไทร	9	11,505
2.	Pong Nam Ron	โป่งน้ำร้อน	13	8,878
4.	Nong Ta Khong	หนองตาคง	10	8,707
9.	Thep Nimit	เทพนิมิต	8	4,743
10.	Khlong Yai	คลองใหญ่	7	4,282

Missing numbers are tambon which now form Soi Dao District.
