= Mueang Chanthaburi district =

Mueang Chanthaburi เมืองจันทบุรี
- District
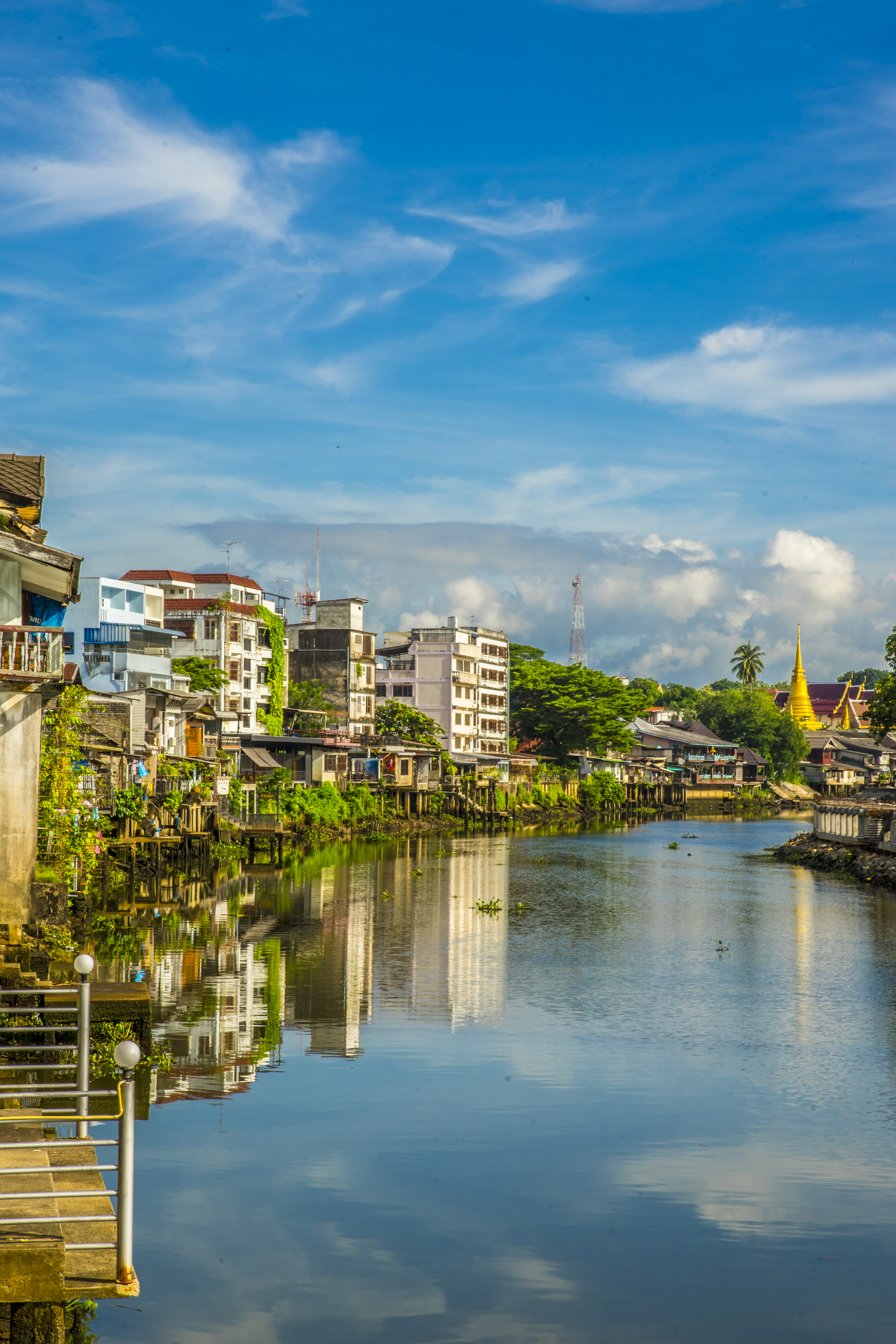
- Chanthaboon Waterfront Community

- District location in Chanthaburi province
- Coordinates: 12°36′38″N 102°6′15″E
- Country: Thailand
- Province: Chanthaburi
- Seat: Wat Mai
- Tambon: 11
- Muban: 98

Area
  - Total: 253.093 km^{2} (97.720 sq mi)

Population (2013)
  - Total: 125,924
  - Density: 471/km^{2} (1,220/sq mi)
- Time zone: UTC+7 (ICT)
- Postal code: 22000
- Geocode: 2201

Mueang Chanthaburi (Thai: เมืองจันทบุรี, pronounced [mɯ̄aŋ tɕān.tʰá(ʔ).bū.rīː]) is the capital district (amphoe mueang) of Chanthaburi province, eastern Thailand.

== History ==
The moated town of Phaniet, also called Mueang Kawai, lies in the district. In a survey of fifteen moated sites of eastern Thailand by Patcharaporn Ngernkerd and colleagues it is the largest, measuring 2.41 km² within its moat, and the only one of their four central towns whose plan is rectangular rather than rounded at the corners. Prasat Phaniet stands inside the moat, and Śiva liṅgas of both Pre-Angkorian and Angkorian style are reported from the town. They treat it as an isolated southern centre, its associated material clustering around the town alone, and reject the mountain route westward to Si Mahosot as an early historic road. The inscription K. 479 is taken to show Angkorian authority reaching the town in the ninth century.

== Geography ==
Neighboring districts are (from the north clockwise) Khao Khitchakut, Makham, Khlung, Laem Sing, and Tha Mai of Chanthaburi Province.

== Administration ==
=== Central administration ===
Mueang Chanthaburi is divided into 11 sub-districts (tambons), which are further subdivided into 98 administrative villages (mubans).

| No. | Name | Thai | Villages | Pop. |
|---|---|---|---|---|
| 1. | Talat | ตลาด | - | 9,288 |
| 2. | Wat Mai | วัดใหม่ | - | 15,009 |
| 3. | Khlong Narai | คลองนารายณ์ | 14 | 8,053 |
| 4. | Ko Khwang | เกาะขวาง | 9 | 14,352 |
| 5. | Khom Bang | คมบาง | 10 | 4,305 |
| 6. | Tha Chang | ท่าช้าง | 12 | 28,286 |
| 7. | Chanthanimit | จันทนิมิต | 9 | 13,017 |
| 8. | Bang Kacha | บางกะจะ | 10 | 10,529 |
| 9. | Salaeng | แสลง | 10 | 4,987 |
| 10. | Nong Bua | หนองบัว | 11 | 6,040 |
| 11. | Phlapphla | พลับพลา | 13 | 12,058 |

=== Local administration ===
There are three towns (thesaban mueangs) in the district:

- Chanthaburi (Thai: เทศบาลเมืองจันทบุรี) consisting of the sub-districts Talat and Wat Mai.
- Chanthanimit (Thai: เทศบาลเมืองจันทนิมิต) consisting of the Chanthanimit sub-district.
- Tha Chang (Thai: เทศบาลเมืองท่าช้าง) consisting of parts of the Tha Chang sub-district.

There are seven sub-district municipalities (thesaban tambons) in the district:

- Khai Noen Wong (Thai: เทศบาลตำบลค่ายเนินวง) consisting of parts of sub-district Bang Kacha.
- Salaeng (Thai: เทศบาลตำบลแสลง) consisting of sub-district Salaeng.
- Phlapphla (Thai: เทศบาลตำบลพลับพลา) consisting of parts of sub-district Phlapphla.
- Bang Kacha (Thai: เทศบาลตำบลบางกะจะ) consisting of parts of sub-district Bang Kacha.
- Phlapphla Narai (Thai: เทศบาลตำบลพลับพลานารายณ์) consisting of parts of sub-districts Khlong Narai and Phlapphla.
- Nong Bua (Thai: เทศบาลตำบลหนองบัว) consisting of parts of sub-district Nong Bua.
- Ko Khwang (Thai: เทศบาลตำบลเกาะขวาง) consisting of sub-district Ko Khwang.

There are four sub-district administrative organizations (SAO) in the district:

- Khlong Narai (Thai: องค์การบริหารส่วนตำบลคลองนารายณ์) consisting of parts of sub-district Khlong Narai.
- Khom Bang (Thai: องค์การบริหารส่วนตำบลคมบาง) consisting of sub-district Khom Bang.
- Tha Chang (Thai: องค์การบริหารส่วนตำบลท่าช้าง) consisting of parts of sub-district Tha Chang.
- Nong Bua (Thai: องค์การบริหารส่วนตำบลหนองบัว) consisting of parts of sub-district Nong Bua.
