= Sa Kaeo (disambiguation) =

Sa Kaeo may refer to several locations in Thailand:

- Sa Kaeo town
- Sa Kaeo Province
- Sa Kaeo district
- Sa Kaeo Refugee Camp
