= Witthaya Thienthong =

Thai politician (1941–2024)

- วิทยา เทียนทอง

Member of the House of Representatives of Thailand
- In office 24 April 1983 – 5 January 2005

Member of the Senate of Thailand
- In office 14 April 2006 – 19 September 2006

Personal details
- Born: 5 May 1941 Watthana Nakhon district, Thailand
- Died: 8 December 2024 (aged 83) Mueang Sa Kaeo district, Thailand
- Party: Thai Nation Party; New Aspiration Party; Thai Rak Thai Party
- Education: Ramkhamhaeng University
- Occupation: Businessman

Witthaya Thienthong (Thai: วิทยา เทียนทอง; 5 May 1941 – 8 December 2024) was a Thai businessman and politician. A member of the Thai Nation Party, the New Aspiration Party, and the Thai Rak Thai Party, he served in the House of Representatives from 1983 to 2005 and was a Senator from April to September 2006.

Witthaya died in Mueang Sa Kaeo district on 8 December 2024, at the age of 83.
