= Kaeng Hang Maeo subdistrict =

Kaeng Hang Maeo Subdistrict ตำบลแก่งหางแมว
- Subdistrict
- Location in Thailand
- Country: Thailand
- Province: Chathaburi
- District: Kaeng Hang Maeo

Government
  - Type: Subdistrict Administrative Organization (SAO)
  - Mayor: Wanchai Saengsuwan

Area
  - Total: 129 km^{2} (50 sq mi)

Population (December 2022)
  - Total: 10,226
  - Density: 79.3/km^{2} (205/sq mi)
- Time zone: UTC+7 (ICT)
- Postcode: 22160
- Area code: (+66) 2
- Website: kanghangmaeo.go.th/public/

Kaeng Hang Maeo (Thai: แก่งหางแมว, pronounced [kɛ̀ŋ hǎːŋ mɛ̄ːw]) is a tambon (subdistrict) of Kaeng Hang Maeo district, Chanthaburi province, eastern Thailand.

== History and toponymy ==
The word Kaeng Hang Maeo consists of two elements. Kaeng means "rapids" and Hang Maeo literally means "cat tail". Its name comes from the fact that the local stream is filled with rapids and isles. While Hang Maeo is the name of a muban (village) in the north (in present-day neighbouring Khun Song).

Kaeng Hang Maeo is an ancient settlement with evidence of being inhabited for hundreds of years. The original indigenous people are the Chong (subgroup of Pearic peoples). Later, more people immigrated to live from nearby provinces such as Prachinburi, Rayong, Chonburi via wagon or boat.

One of the villages is Ban Chong Kaphat (บ้านช่องกะพัด). Its name comes from a local tale that after a night of heavy rain. The next morning, a large fish was found stranded in the riverbed in front of the village. That kind of fish is locally called Kaphat or widely known as Asian arowana. Hence the name Ban Chong Kaphat (lit "village of arowana's channel").

== Geography ==
Adjacent subdistricts are (from the north clockwise): Khun Song in its district, Khlong Phlu in Khao Khitchakut district, Khao Kaeo in Tha Mai district, Sam Phi Nong and Phwa in its district.

The terrain is characterized by plains and river plains. There are some parts of the hilly plateau, while some are high mountains.

Khlong Ta Not or Khlong Wang Ta Not is the main water resource.

Kaeng Hang Maeo has an area of approximately 129 km^{2} (8,0625 rai).

== Administration ==
=== Central administration ===
The entire area of Kaeng Hang Maeo is under the administration of Kaeng Hang Maeo Subdistrict Administrative Organization.

The seal of Kaeng Hang Maeo Subdistrict Administrative Organization is a cat sitting under a tree.

=== Local administration ===
The subdistrict also consists of 22 administrative villages.

No.	Name	Thai
1.	Ban Ta Nong	บ้านตาหน่อง
2.	Ban Chong Kaphat	บ้านช่องกะพัด
3.	Ban Kaeng	บ้านแก่ง
4.	Ban Pong Khanom Chin	บ้านโป่งขนมจีน
5.	Ban Khao Som Poi	บ้านเขาส้มป่อย
6.	Ban Pong Wua	บ้านโป่งวัว
7.	Ban Nam Pen	บ้านน้ำเป็น
8.	Ban Khlong Ta King	บ้านคลองตาขิง
9.	Ban Nong Bua Thong	บ้านหนองบัวทอง
10.	Ban Ang Ma Krut	บ้านอ่างมะกรูด
11.	Ban Wang Ta Mueang	บ้านวังตาเมือง
12.	Ban Ko Loi	บ้านเกาะลอย
13.	Ban Saeng Thong	บ้านแสงทอง
14.	Ban Wang Mai	บ้านวังใหม่
15.	Ban Khlong Ruea	บ้านคลองเรือ
16.	Ban Khlong Khloi	บ้านคลองกลอย
17.	Ban Charoen Suk	บ้านเจริญสุข
18.	Ban Na Bun	บ้านนาบุญ
19.	Ban Ton Sai	บ้านต้นไทร
20.	ฺBan Noen Kra Bok	บ้านเนินกระบก
21.	Ban Thung Yai Thong	บ้านทุ่งยายทอง
22.	Bang Wang Kaeng	บ้านวังแก่ง

== Population ==
By the end of 2022, it had a total population of 10,226.
