= Chanthaburi Airstrip =

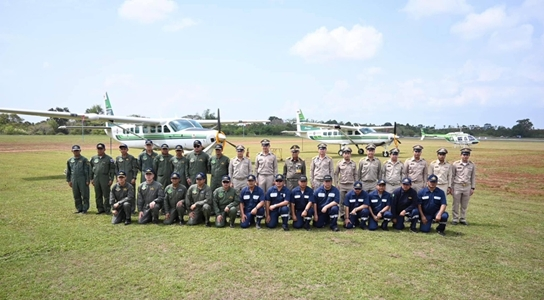
- The Department of Royal Rain and Agricultural Aviation at Chanthaburi Airport
- IATA: none; ICAO: VTBC

Summary
- Airport type: Public / Military
- Owner: Royal Thai Navy
- Operator: Royal Thai Navy
- Serves: Chanthaburi
- Location: Tha Mai, Tha Mai District, Chanthaburi, Thailand
- Elevation AMSL: 120 ft / 37 m
- Coordinates: 12°38′N 102°2′E

Map

Runways
Direction	Length		Surface
Direction	ft	m	Surface
1	3,215	980	Asphalt

Chanthaburi Airstrip (Thai: สนามบินจันทบุรี)(IATA: N/A, ICAO: VTBC) is an airport located in Tha Mai, Tha Mai District, Chanthaburi Province, Thailand. The airport is owned by the Royal Thai Air Force and utilized by the Royal Thai Navy. As of 2023, the airport is not opened for commercial use.
