= Ban Non Somboon =

Archaeological site and village in Nakhon Ratchasima province, Thailand

- บ้านโนนสมบูรณ์ (Thai)
- Location in Thailand
- Interactive map of Ban Non Somboon
- 14°20′06″N 102°25′16″E
- Type: Archaeological site
- Periods: Iron Age
- Location: Non Somboon subdistrict, Soeng Sang district, Nakhon Ratchasima province, Thailand

History
- Abandoned: c. 14th century
- Rebuilt: 1962

Site notes
- Condition: Disturbed by land levelling
- Management: Fine Arts Department

Ban Non Somboon Thai: บ้านโนนสมบูรณ์
- Village
- Country: Thailand
- Province: Nakhon Ratchasima
- District: Soeng Sang
- Subdistrict: Non Sombun

Population (2021)
  - Total: 1,119
  - Registered houses: 392
- Time zone: UTC+7 (ICT)
- Village number: Mu 1

Ban Non Somboon (Thai: บ้านโนนสมบูรณ์) is a village and archaeological site in Non Somboon subdistrict, Soeng Sang district, in the south of Nakhon Ratchasima province, northeastern Thailand. The village and the site date from different periods. The village, established in 1962, is Mu 1 of the subdistrict and had a population of 1,119 in 2021.

The Ban Non Somboon archaeological site is a low mound in farmland, now within Thap Lan National Park. Objects recovered from it have been read as marking an Iron Age community with a burial tradition. The site is unexcavated, and the material had been displaced before it was examined.

== History ==
The ground has been read as a settlement, or a community practising burial, placed where water and game were available. On that reading the community belongs to the Iron Age, about 2,500 to 1,500 years before present, and continued into the historic period. The carnelian and agate are read as exchange with communities outside the region, India among them, and the Chinese porcelain as reaching the site by the 14th century, after which the place may have been abandoned.

Those readings are offered as suppositions. The material was disturbed and moved before it was examined, and no deposit at the site has been dated.

The area was resettled within Sa Takien subdistrict, then part of Khon Buri district, and the modern village of Ban Non Somboon was officially established in 1962.

== Administrative division ==
Ban Non Somboon is Mu 1 of Non Sombun subdistrict and is divided between two local authorities. The subdistrict has fourteen villages, and Ban Non Somboon is one of five that lie only partly inside the area of the subdistrict administrative organization. That organization was established on 19 January 1996, and its area is the subdistrict excluding any part lying within a municipality or sanitary district.

In December 2021 the part of the village inside Non Sombun subdistrict municipality held 1,060 people in 347 registered houses. The part under the subdistrict administrative organization held 59 people in 45 houses.

== Archaeological findings ==
The site has not been excavated. What is known of it comes from a single examination of material that had already been displaced.

=== Discovery ===
The site came to notice after a report in May 2016. Potsherds had been exposed and scattered when machinery levelled the ground, in a narrow spread in the middle of one field rather than across the whole mound. Villagers had by then carried objects to Wat Khok Noi in the same village, where they were heaped beneath a building. Those objects were sorted into classes, and a selection of them examined.

=== Finds ===
The earthenware includes plain and cord-marked wares, black burnished sherds of Phimai Black type, green-glazed ware, and Chinese porcelain. Spindle whorls and fragments of potter's anvils were recorded with them, and the metal is bronze in fragments, with iron spearheads and hoes.

The ornaments are glass beads in orange, dark blue, and light blue, pierced hexagonal carnelian beads, and a pierced oval bead of black and white agate.

Human bone includes cranial fragments, a mandible, teeth, ribs, and limb bones. Animal bone of the same classes was recorded and taken to be from cattle or buffalo.
