= Soi Dao district =

Soi Dao สอยดาว
- District
- District location in Chanthaburi province
- Coordinates: 13°8′14″N 102°13′8″E
- Country: Thailand
- Province: Chanthaburi
- Seat: Patong

Area
  - Total: 733.8 km^{2} (283.3 sq mi)

Population (2005)
  - Total: 62,340
  - Density: 85/km^{2} (220/sq mi)
- Time zone: UTC+7 (ICT)
- Postal code: 22180
- Geocode: 2207

Soi Dao (Thai: สอยดาว, pronounced [sɔ̌j dāːw]) is a district (amphoe) in the northern part of Chanthaburi province, eastern Thailand.

== History ==
The government created the minor district (king amphoe) Soi Dao on 1 January 1988, by splitting off five tambon from Pong Nam Ron district. It was upgraded to a full district on 9 May 1992.

== Geography ==
Neighboring districts are (from the south clockwise) Pong Nam Ron, Khao Khitchakut, Kaeng Hang Maeo of Chanthaburi Province, Wang Sombun, and Khlong Hat of Sa Kaeo province. To the east is Battambang province of Cambodia.

== Administration ==
The district is divided into five sub-districts (tambons), which are further subdivided into 68 villages (mubans). Sai Khao is a township (thesaban tambon) which covers parts of tambon Sai Khao and Pa Tong. There are a further five tambon administrative organizations (TAO).

No.	Name	Thai name	Villages	Pop.
1.	Patong	ปะตง	11	14,902
2.	Thung Khanan	ทุ่งขนาน	16	10,362
3.	Thap Chang	ทับช้าง	16	15,840
4.	Sai Khao	ทรายขาว	13	12,474
5.	Saton	สะตอน	12	8,762
