= Lahan Sai district =

Lahan Sai ละหานทราย
- District
- District location in Buriram province
- Coordinates: 14°24′42″N 102°51′36″E
- Country: Thailand
- Province: Buriram

Area
  - Total: 735.0 km^{2} (283.8 sq mi)

Population (2008)
  - Total: 70,825
  - Density: 96.4/km^{2} (250/sq mi)
- Time zone: UTC+7 (ICT)
- Postal code: 31170
- Geocode: 3106

Lahan Sai (Thai: ละหานทราย, pronounced [lā.hǎːn sāːj]; Northeastern Thai: ละหานทราย, pronounced [lā.hǎːn sâːj]) is a district (amphoe) in the southern part of Buriram province, northeastern Thailand.

== History ==
The district shares with neighbouring Ban Kruat a group of more than two hundred kiln mounds, which worked between the 10th and the 12th centuries and supplied the Angkorian world with stoneware. Wares from the group have been found as far west as the Chao Phraya plain, at Ban Nong Chaeng in Don Chedi, Suphan Buri.

Lahan Sai area was originally part of Nang Rong district. The area was fertile and covered by dense forest, so people from neighboring districts moved to establish new village there. When the community grew bigger, the government created a minor district (king amphoe) on 1 January 1961 to make it more comfortable for the citizen to reach public services. The new district covered tambons Lahan Sai and Pakham. It was upgraded to a full district on 17 July 1963.

== Etymology ==
Lahan Sai means "plain fertile width hog deer" (Axis porcinus).

== Geography ==
Neighboring districts are (from the southwest clockwise) Ta Phraya of Sa Kaeo province, Non Din Daeng, Pakham, Nang Rong, Chaloem Phra Kiat, Prakhon Chai, and Ban Kruat of Buriram Province. To the southeast it borders the provinces of Banteay Meanchey and Oddar Meancheay of Cambodia.

The Sankamphaeng Range mountainous area is in the southern section of this district.

== Motto ==
The Lahan Sai District's motto is "The Lung Pu Suk so sacred, city of horticulture and farm plants, many of silk, beautiful of Hin-Lum (Rock hole), many of river basin, Lanan Sai is border city."

== Administration ==
The district is divided into six sub-districts (tambons), which are further subdivided into 95 villages (mubans). Lahan Sai is a sub-district municipality (thesaban tambon) which covers parts of tambons Lahan Sai. Ta Chong, Samrong Mai, and Nong Waeng are sub-district municipalities which each cover the complete same-named sub-district. The non-municipal parts of Lahan Sai and the sub-districts Nong Takhrong and Khok Wan each have one tambon administrative organization (TAO).

No.	Name	Thai	Villages	Pop.
1.	Lahan Sai	ละหานทราย	27	12,346
3.	Ta Chong	ตาจง	22	15,575
4.	Samrong Mai	สำโรงใหม่	13	12,068
7.	Nong Waeng	หนองแวง	11	15,676
10.	Nong Takhrong	หนองตะครอง	12	8,011
11.	Khok Wan	โคกว่าน	10	7,149

Missing numbers are tambon which now form Non Din Daeng district and parts of Chaloem Phra Kiat district.
