= Kaeng Hang Maeo district =

Kaeng Hang Maeo แก่งหางแมว
- District
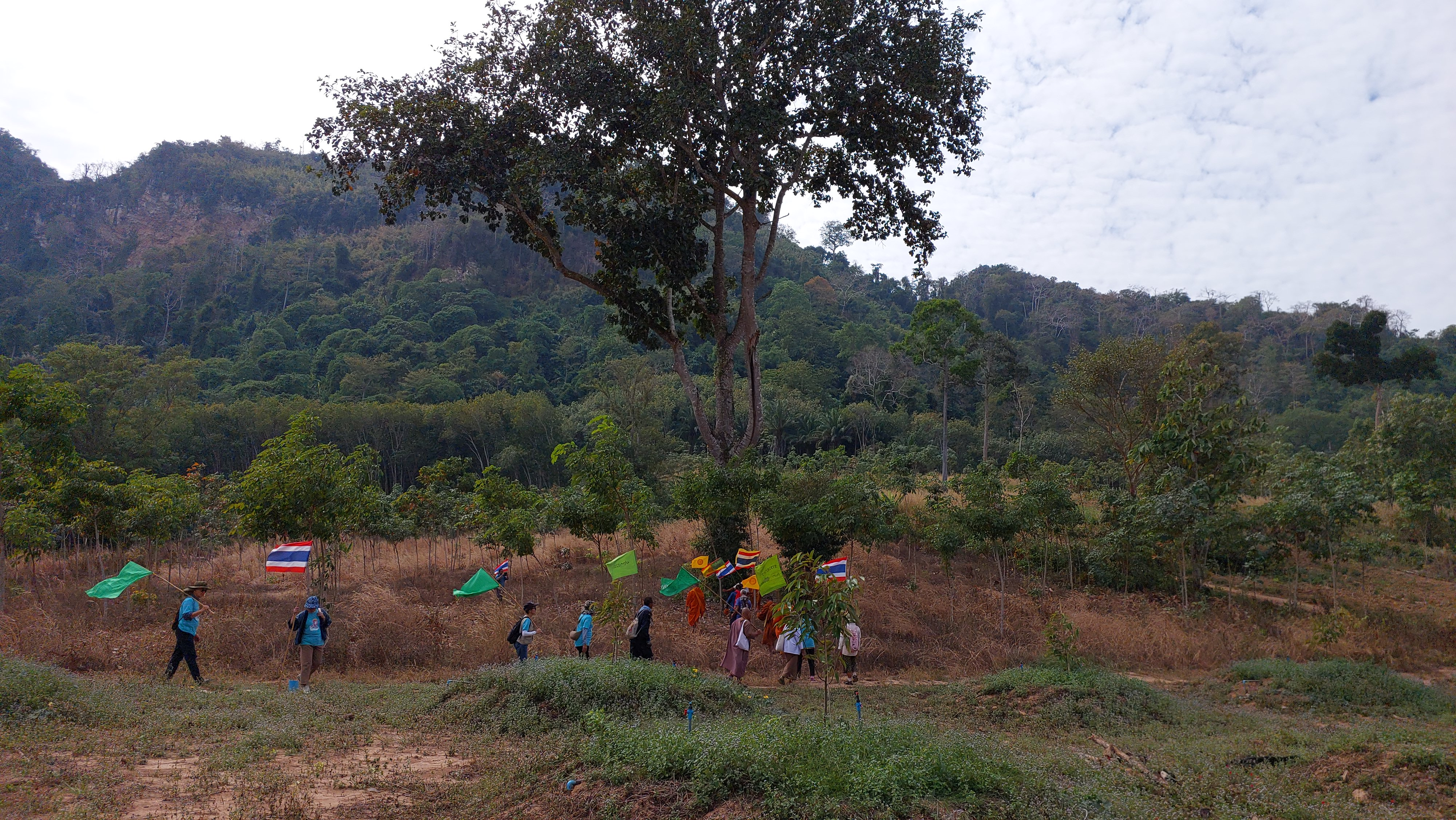
- Forest in Kaeng Hang Maeo District

- District location in Chanthaburi province
- Coordinates: 13°0′30″N 101°54′18″E
- Country: Thailand
- Province: Chanthaburi
- Seat: Kaeng Hang Maeo

Area
  - Total: 1,254.1 km^{2} (484.2 sq mi)

Population (2005)
  - Total: 36,453
  - Density: 29.1/km^{2} (75/sq mi)
- Time zone: UTC+7 (ICT)
- Postal code: 22160
- Geocode: 2208

Kaeng Hang Maeo (Thai: แก่งหางแมว, pronounced [kɛ̀ŋ hǎːŋ mɛ̄ːw]) is the northwesternmost district (amphoe) of Chanthaburi province, eastern Thailand.

== Geography ==
Neighboring districts are (from the east clockwise) Soi Dao, Khao Khitchakut, Tha Mai, Na Yai Am of Chanthaburi Province, Klaeng, Khao Chamao of Rayong province, Bo Thong of Chonburi province, Tha Takiap of Chachoengsao province and Wang Sombun of Sa Kaeo province.

== History ==
The minor district (king amphoe) Kaeng Hang Maeo was established on 1 April 1990 by splitting off five tambon from Tha Mai district. It was upgraded to a full district on 8 September 1992.

== Administration ==
The district is divided into five sub-districts (tambons), which are further subdivided into 62 villages (mubans). There are no municipal entities (thesabans). There are five tambon administrative organizations (TAO).

No.	Name	Thai name	Villages	Pop.
1.	Kaeng Hang Maeo	แก่งหางแมว	21	8,395
2.	Khun Song	ขุนซ่อง	17	10,671
3.	Sam Phi Nong	สามพี่น้อง	9	5,345
4.	Phawa	พวา	12	9,086
5.	Khao Wongkot	เขาวงกต	3	2,956
