= Na Yai Am district =

Na Yai Am นายายอาม
- District
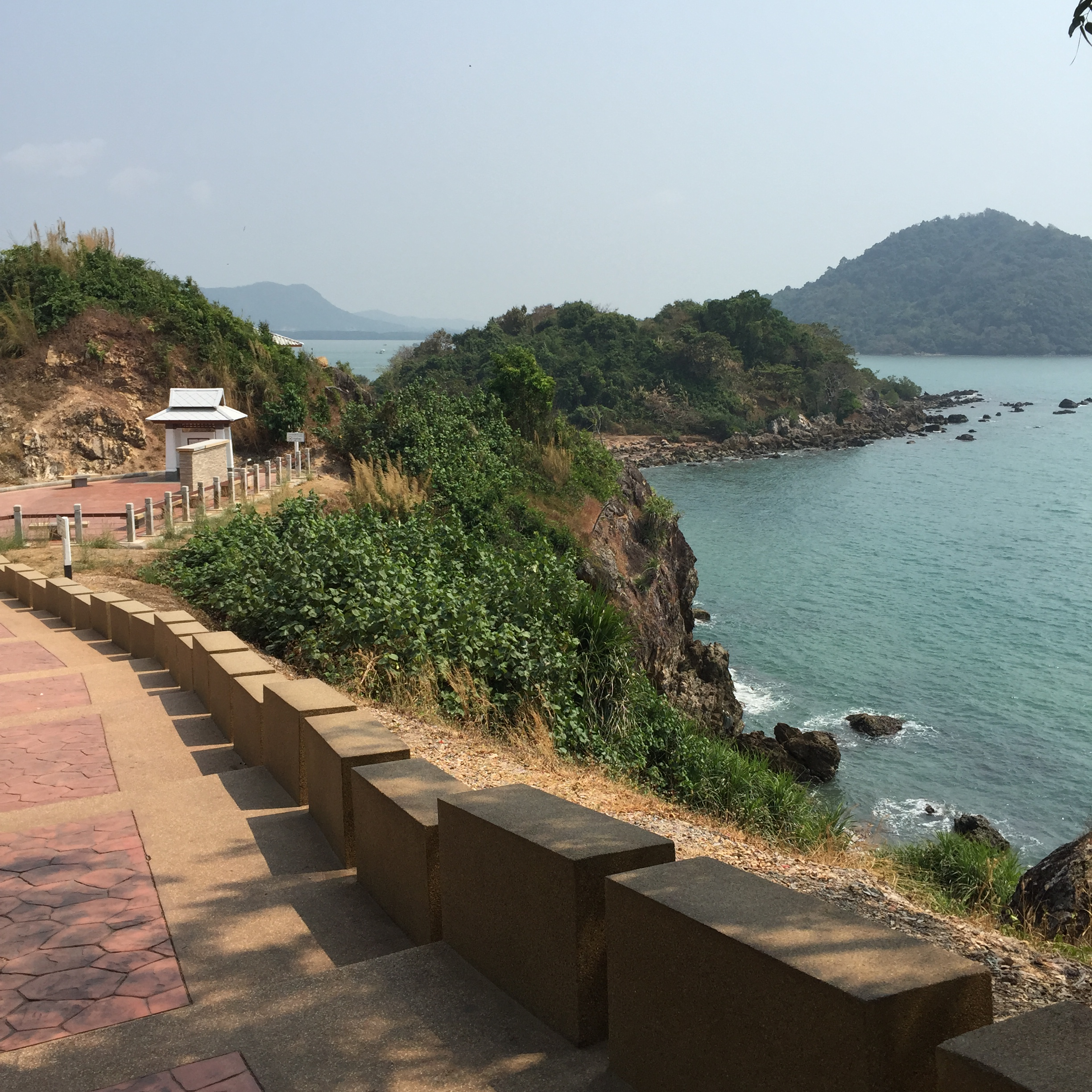
- View of the cliff and the sea seen from Noen Nang Phaya, a scenic viewpoint of Chaloem Burapha Chonlathit Road, Sanam Chai, Na Yai Am

- District location in Chanthaburi province
- Coordinates: 12°46′12″N 101°51′18″E
- Country: Thailand
- Province: Chanthaburi
- Seat: Na Yai Am

Area
  - Total: 300.0 km^{2} (115.8 sq mi)

Population (2005)
  - Total: 32,108
  - Density: 107/km^{2} (280/sq mi)
- Time zone: UTC+7 (ICT)
- Postal code: 22160
- Geocode: 2209

Na Yai Am (Thai: นายายอาม, pronounced [nāː jāːj ʔāːm]) is a district (amphoe) in the western part of Chanthaburi province, eastern Thailand.

== History ==
The district was created on 1 April 1992 by splitting off the five western tambons of Tha Mai district. It was upgraded to a full district on 5 December 1996.

Its name "Na Yai Am" directly translates as "grandma Am's rice field". This refers to the residence and rice field here in the past of an old woman named Yai Am (grandma Am) and a place where people passed by. Therefore, it was called by name of the owner.

== Geography ==
Neighbouring districts are (from the west clockwise) Klaeng of Rayong province, Kaeng Hang Maeo, and Tha Mai of Chanthaburi Province. To the southwest is the Gulf of Thailand.

== Administration ==
The district is divided into six sub-districts (tambons), which are further subdivided into 67 villages (mubans). Na Yai Am is a township (thesaban tambon) which covers parts of tambon Na Yai Am. There are a further six tambon administrative organizations (TAO) responsible for the non-municipal areas.

No.	Name	Thai name	Villages	Pop.
1.	Na Yai Am	นายายอาม	15	9414
2.	Wang Tanot	วังโตนด	10	3532
3.	Krachae	กระแจะ	11	4671
4.	Sanam Chai	สนามไชย	8	4349
5.	Chang Kham	ช้างข้าม	13	4739
6.	Wang Mai	วังใหม่	10	5403
