= Non Din Daeng district =

Non Din Daeng โนนดินแดง
- District
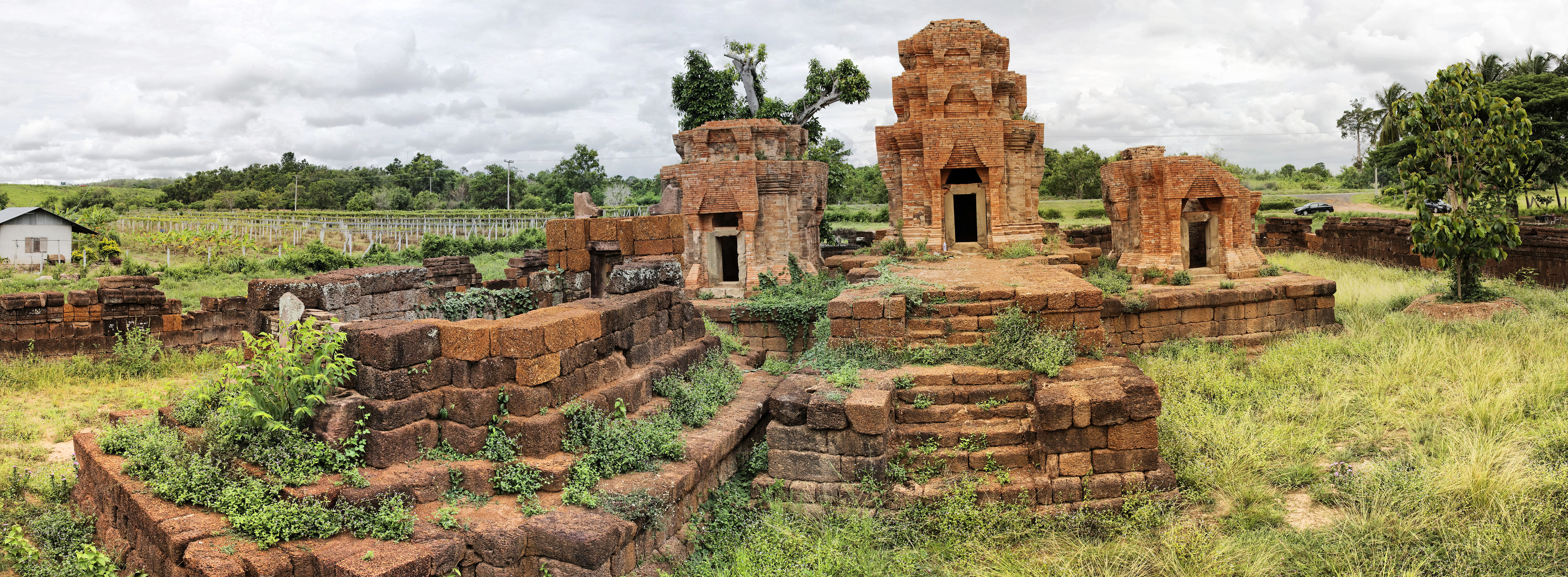
- Prasat Nong Hong

- District location in Buriram province
- Coordinates: 14°18′57″N 102°44′37″E
- Country: Thailand
- Province: Buriram
- Seat: Non Din Daeng

Area
  - Total: 448.0 km^{2} (173.0 sq mi)

Population (2005)
  - Total: 26,073
  - Density: 58.2/km^{2} (151/sq mi)
- Time zone: UTC+7 (ICT)
- Postal code: 31260
- Geocode: 3120

Non Din Daeng (Thai: โนนดินแดง, pronounced [nōːn dīn dɛ̄ːŋ]) is the southwesternmost district (amphoe) of Buriram province, northeastern Thailand.

== Geography ==
Neighboring districts are (from the north clockwise) Pakham, Lahan Sai of Buriram Province, Ta Phraya, Watthana Nakhon of Sa Kaeo province and Soeng Sang of Nakhon Ratchasima province.

The Sankamphaeng Range mountainous area is in the southern section of this district.

== History ==
The minor district (king amphoe) Non Din Daeng was created on 31 May 1993, when three tambons were split off from Lahan Sai district. It was upgraded to a full district on 5 December 1996.

== Motto ==
The Non Din Daeng District's motto is "City of good people, Rao su ('we fight') monument, Prasat Nong Hong, forest and nature, Lamnangrong Dam beach."

== Administration ==
The district is divided into three sub-districts (tambons), which are further subdivided into 45 villages (mubans). Non Din Daeng is a township (thesaban tambon) which covers parts of tambons Non Din Daeng and Sompoi. There are also three tambon administrative organizations (TAO).

No.	Name	Thai name	Villages	Pop.
1.	Non Din Daeng	โนนดินแดง	25	11,991
2.	Som Poi	ส้มป่อย	7	4,393
3.	Lam Nang Rong	ลำนางรอง	13	9,689
