= Khao Chakan district =

Khao Chakan เขาฉกรรจ์
- District
- District location in Sa Kaeo province
- Coordinates: 13°39′6″N 102°5′48″E
- Country: Thailand
- Province: Sa Kaeo
- Seat: Khao Chakan

Area
  - Total: 774.31 km^{2} (298.96 sq mi)

Population (2008)
  - Total: 57,016
  - Density: 73.7/km^{2} (191/sq mi)
- Time zone: UTC+7 (ICT)
- Postal code: 27000
- Geocode: 2707

Khao Chakan (Thai: เขาฉกรรจ์, pronounced [kʰǎw t͡ɕʰā.kān]) is a district (amphoe) in the western part of Sa Kaeo province, eastern Thailand.

== Toponymy ==
The district is named after the hills of Khao Chakan, a group of limestone hills rising out of the valley alluvium. In the hills are several caves (all 72 caves), including the cave temple Wat Tham Khao Chakan. The hills are habitat to about 2,000 crab-eating macaques.

Its name literally translates as "relentless hill". Legendarily Hanuman shot an arrow through this hills, hence the name "Khao Thotsakan" (เขาทศกัณฐ์, "hills of Ravana). Later, it became distorted to be Khao Chakan like today.

Another story is King Taksin brought his army through the area and performed a ceremony called "Cho-Kan" (ฉอ-กัณฑ์) to terrorize the enemy. Later, people called distortions to Khao Chakan.

== History ==
The minor district (king amphoe) Khao Chakan was established 30 April 1994 with four tambons split off from Mueang Sa Kaeo district. On 11 October 1997 it was upgraded to a full district.

== Geography ==
Neighboring districts are (from the north clockwise) Mueang Sa Kaeo, Watthana Nakhon, Khlong Hat, and Wang Nam Yen of Sa Kaeo Province, and Tha Takiap of Chachoengsao province.

== Administration ==
The district is divided into four sub-districts (tambons), which are further subdivided into 62 villages (mubans). There are no municipal (thesaban) areas. Each of the sub-districts is administered by a tambon administrative organization (TAO).

No.	Name	Thai	Villages	Pop.
1.	Khao Chakan	เขาฉกรรจ์	11	11,593
2.	Nong Wa	หนองหว้า	23	21,156
3.	Phra Phloeng	พระเพลิง	16	16,387
4.	Khao Sam Sip	เขาสามสิบ	12	7,880
