= Fahbunmee Sor.Damnern =

Thai Muay Thai fighter

Fahmeeboon Sor.Damnern
- Born: 1999 (age 26–27); Sa Kaeo, Thailand
- Other names: Fahboonmee Birdrangsit (ฟ้าบุญมี เบิร์ดรังสิต); Fahmeeboon Sor.Damnern (ฟ้ามีบุญ ส.ดำเนิน)
- Height: 160 cm (5 ft 3 in)
- Weight: 53.5 kg (118 lb; 8.42 st)
- Division: Super Flyweight; Bantamweight
- Style: Muay Fimeu
- Fighting out of: Nonthaburi, Thailand
- Team: Sor.Jor.Lekmuangnon Gym

Fahbunmee Sor.Damnern (ฟ้าบุญมี ส.ดำเนิน) is a Thai Muay Thai fighter. He fights out of Sor.Jor.Lekmuangnon Gym in Lahan, Nonthaburi. Early in his career, he was a student of Sangtiennoi Sor.Rungroj at Tor.Sangtiennoi Gym. In 2017, at 18 years old, Fahmeeboon won the 105 lb Rajadamnern Stadium title which he vacated in order to move up in weight.

== Titles and accomplishments ==
- 2017 Rajadamnern Stadium Minimumweight (105 lbs) Champion
- 2020 Rajadamnern Stadium Super Flyweight (115 lbs) Champion

== Fight record ==
Muay Thai Record (incomplete)
Date	Result	Opponent	Event	Location	Method	Round	Time
2026-02-21	Loss	(Thailand) Yoddoi Kaewsamrit	Rajadamnern World Series	Bangkok, Thailand	TKO (Leg injury)	1	
2025-12-13	Loss	(Thailand) Rakchumphon Thaosaeyasat	Kiatpetch Muay Thai Fight	Bangkok, Thailand	TKO (Doctor stoppage)	4	
2025-10-25	Win	(Iran) Taha SingburiFightClub	Rajadamnern World Series	Bangkok, Thailand	Decision (Unanimous)	3	3:00
2025-03-30	Loss	(Thailand) Arrow RisingMuayThai	TKO Kiatpetch, Rajadamnern Stadium	Bangkok, Thailand	TKO (Knees)	4	
2025-02-16	Win	(Thailand) Rungruanglek NumnimTN MuayThai	TKO Kiatpetch, Rajadamnern Stadium	Bangkok, Thailand	Decision	5	3:00
2025-01-11	Win	(Thailand) Konlayut Suannamthankiri	Kiatpetch SKS Super Fight, Siam Omnoi Stadium	Samut Sakhon, Thailand	KO (Right uppercut)	2	
2024-09-22	Loss	(Thailand) Wirachat KingbonroofPhuket	Kiatpetch SKS Super Fight, Siam Omnoi Stadium	Samut Sakhon, Thailand	Decision	5	3:00
2021-02-28	Loss	(Thailand) Saifahnoi MuadvitisChiangMai	WSS Fights, World Siam Stadium	Bangkok, Thailand	Decision	5	3:00
2020-11-04	Win	(Thailand) Saifahnoi MuadvitisChiangMai	Rajadamnern Stadium	Bangkok, Thailand	Decision	5	3:00
Wins the vacant Rajadamnern Stadium Super Flyweight (115 lbs) title
2020-10-10	Win	(Thailand) Petchmuangnon Jitmuangnon	Thanakorn Stadium	Thailand	KO	3	
2020-09-09	Loss	(Thailand) Saifahnoi MuadvitisChiangMai	Thanakorn Stadium	Thailand	Decision	5	3:00
2020-02-24	Draw	(Thailand) Petchmuangnon Jitmuangnon	Rajadamnern Stadium	Bangkok, Thailand	Decision	5	3:00
2020-01-21	Win	(Thailand) Yodpanum Por.Phetkaikaew	Lumpinee Stadium	Bangkok, Thailand	Decision	5	3:00
2019-12-29	Win	(Thailand) Pichitchai Sor.Jor.Vichitmuangpadriew	Rajadamnern Stadium	Bangkok, Thailand	Decision	5	3:00
2019-11-30	Win	(Thailand) Wirachat Boonrasri	Rajadamnern Stadium	Bangkok, Thailand	Decision	5	3:00
2019-09-30	Win	(Thailand) Yodphet Annymuaythai	Rajadamnern Stadium	Bangkok, Thailand	Decision	5	3:00
2019-07-08	Loss	(Thailand) Pichitchai Sor.Jor.Vichitmuangpadriew	Rajadamnern Stadium	Bangkok, Thailand	Decision	5	3:00
2019-06-08	Loss	(Thailand) Namsurin Chor.Ketwina	Siam Omnoi Stadium	Bangkok, Thailand	Decision	5	3:00
2019-03-08	Loss	(Thailand) Dejrit Por.Telakul	Rajadamnern Stadium	Bangkok, Thailand	Decision	5	3:00
2019-01-24	Win	(Thailand) Phichitchai Por.Chalad	Rajadamnern Stadium	Bangkok, Thailand	KO	4	
2018-12-14	Loss	(Thailand) Dejrit Por.Telakul	Lumpinee Stadium	Bangkok, Thailand	Decision	5	3:00
2018-09-21	Draw	(Thailand) Wanmawin Aor.Meekun	Rajadamnern Stadium	Bangkok, Thailand	Decision	5	3:00
2018-05-19	Loss	(Thailand) Mohawk Teeded99	Siam Omnoi Stadium	Bangkok, Thailand	Decision	5	3:00
2018-04-10	Win	(Thailand) Phetpanlan Petchsimuen	Lumpinee Stadium	Bangkok, Thailand	KO	3	
2017-11-02	Loss	(Thailand) Sayanlek Sayangym	Rajadamnern Stadium	Bangkok, Thailand	Decision	5	3:00
2017-09-15	Win	(Thailand) Anuwat Natkinpa	Rajadamnern Stadium	Bangkok, Thailand	Decision	5	3:00
2017-06-15	Win	(Thailand) Kumantong Chor.Hapayak	Rajadamnern Stadium	Bangkok, Thailand	Decision	5	3:00
Wins the Rajadamnern Stadium Minimumweight (105 lbs) title
2017-05-09	Win	(Thailand) Ninmongkon Aor.Sabuytae	Lumpinee Stadium	Bangkok, Thailand	Decision	5	3:00
2017-04-13	Win	(Thailand) Rungwittaya Singnawawut	Rajadamnern Stadium	Bangkok, Thailand	Decision	5	3:00
2017-03-01	Loss	(Thailand) Konkhon Kiatphontip	Rajadamnern Stadium	Bangkok, Thailand	Decision	5	3:00
2017-01-30	Win	(Thailand) Phetpanlan Big-M-Gym	Rajadamnern Stadium	Bangkok, Thailand	Decision	5	3:00
2016-12-06	Loss	(Thailand) Hongtae Rinmuaythai	Lumpinee Stadium	Bangkok, Thailand	Decision	5	3:00
2016-09-10	Loss	(Thailand) Kaodengsuji Banmikiew	Montree Studio Boxing Stadium	Bangkok, Thailand	KO	2	
2015-12-30	Loss	(Thailand) Bangklanoi Sakchaichot	Rajadamnern Stadium	Bangkok, Thailand	Decision	5	3:00
2015-12-02	Loss	(Thailand) Bangklanoi Sakchaichot	Rajadamnern Stadium	Bangkok, Thailand	Decision	5	3:00
2015-10-28	Win	(Thailand) Bangklanoi Sakchaichot	Lumpinee Stadium	Bangkok, Thailand	Decision	5	3:00
2015-09-26	Win	(Thailand) Kaodeng Sujibamikiew	Montree Studio	Bangkok, Thailand	Decision	5	3:00
2015-08-26	Win	(Thailand) Suwanabhum STD.Transport	Rajadamnern Stadium	Bangkok, Thailand	KO	1	
2015-07-29	Win	(Thailand) Salatan Sor.Jor.Vichitpradriew	Rajadamnern Stadium	Bangkok, Thailand	KO	3	
2015-04-24	Win	(Thailand) Pananchoenglek Sitkrupak	Lumpinee Stadium	Bangkok, Thailand	KO	4	
Legend: Win Loss Draw/No contest Notes
