= Wang Sombun district =

Wang Sombun วังสมบูรณ์
- District
- District location in Sa Kaeo province
- Coordinates: 13°23′49″N 102°11′55″E
- Country: Thailand
- Province: Sa Kaeo
- Seat: Wang Mai

Area
  - Total: 383.5 km^{2} (148.1 sq mi)

Population (2005)
  - Total: 35,334
  - Density: 92.1/km^{2} (239/sq mi)
- Time zone: UTC+7 (ICT)
- Postal code: 27250
- Geocode: 2709

Wang Sombun (Thai: วังสมบูรณ์, pronounced [wāŋ sǒm.būːn]) is a district (amphoe) in the southwestern part of Sa Kaeo province, eastern Thailand.

== Geography ==
Neighbouring districts are (from the north clockwise) Wang Nam Yen and Khlong Hat of Sa Kaeo Province, Soi Dao and Kaeng Hang Maeo of Chanthaburi province, and Tha Takiap of Chachoengsao province.

== History ==
The minor district (king amphoe) was established 1 July 1997 with three tambons split from Wang Nam Yen district. On 15 May 2007, all 81 minor districts upgraded to full districts. On 24 August the upgrade became official.

== Administration ==
The district is divided into three sub-districts (tambons), which are further subdivided into 48 villages (mubans). Wang Sombun is a township (thesaban tambon) which covers tambon Wang Sombun. There are a further two tambon administrative organizations (TAO).

No.	Name	Thai name	Villages	Pop.
1.	Wang Sombun	วังสมบูรณ์	17	10,549
2.	Wang Mai	วังใหม่	14	11,973
3.	Wang Thong	วังทอง	17	12,812
