= Nang Rong district =

Nang Rong นางรอง
- District
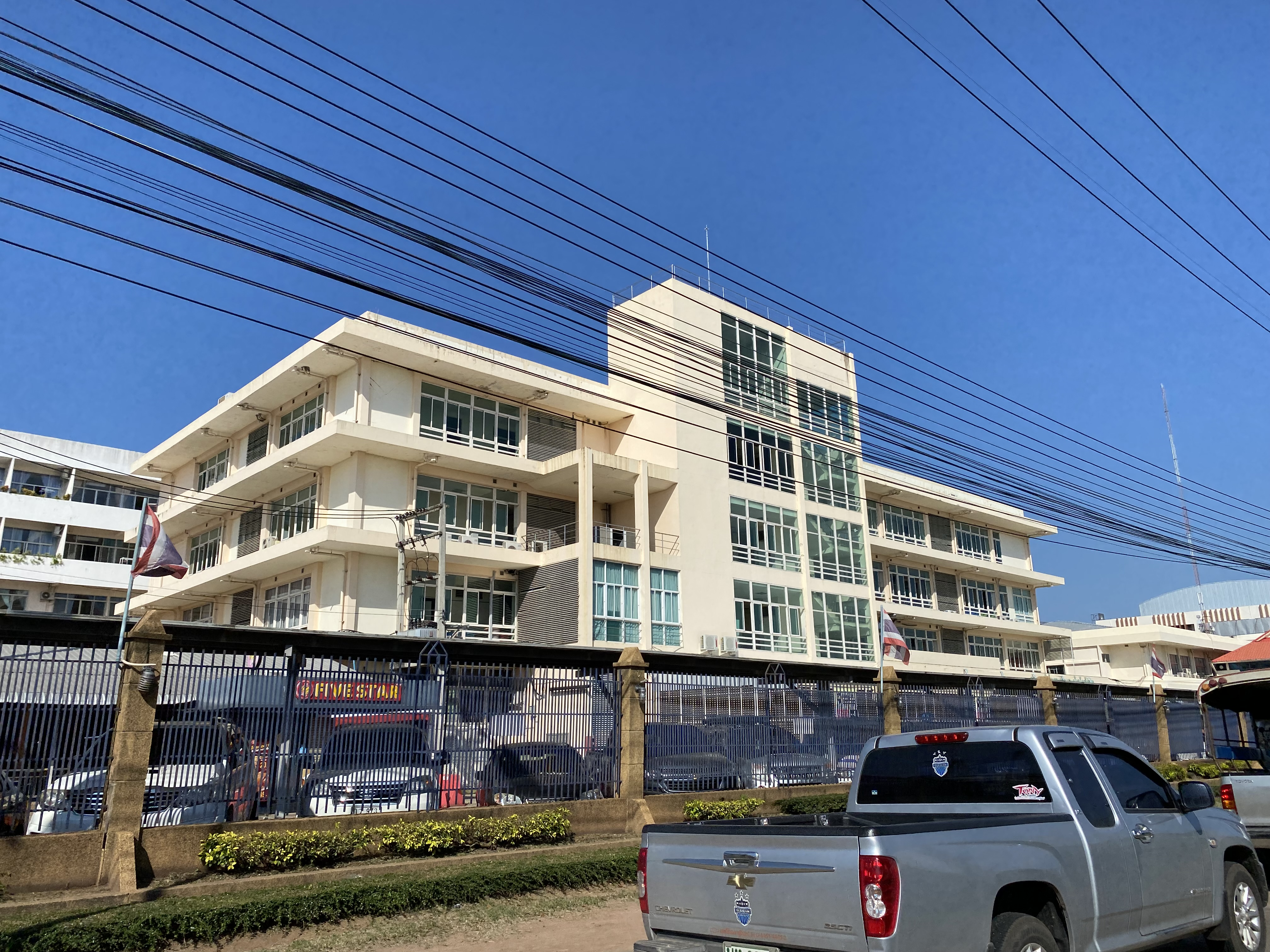
- Nang Rong Hospital

- District location in Buriram province
- Coordinates: 14°37′42″N 102°47′36″E
- Country: Thailand
- Province: Buriram

Area
  - Total: 769.8 km^{2} (297.2 sq mi)

Population (2005)
  - Total: 108,143
  - Density: 151.6/km^{2} (393/sq mi)
- Time zone: UTC+7 (ICT)
- Postal code: 31110
- Geocode: 3104

Nang Rong (Thai: นางรอง, pronounced [nāːŋ rɔ̄ːŋ]; Northeastern Thai: นางรอง, pronounced [nâːŋ lɔ̂ːŋ]) is a district (amphoe) of Buriram province, northeastern Thailand. The district lies approximately 50 km south-southwest of Buriram City.

== Geography ==
Neighboring districts are (from the northeast clockwise) Chamni, Mueang Buriram, Prakhon Chai, Chaloem Phra Kiat, Lahan Sai, Pakham, Non Suwan, and Nong Ki of Buriram Province.

It is the closest town to the Phanom Rung Historical Park, and 11th century religious site.

== Motto ==
The Nang Rong District's motto is "The ancient city, coconut and sugar, city pillar shrine, Progressive economy, delicious boiled pork leg and Nang Rong language."

== Climate ==
Climate data for Nang Rong (1991–2020)
Month	Jan	Feb	Mar	Apr	May	Jun	Jul	Aug	Sep	Oct	Nov	Dec	Year
Record high °C (°F)	37.8 (100.0)	40.4 (104.7)	41.4 (106.5)	41.8 (107.2)	40.7 (105.3)	39.3 (102.7)	38.6 (101.5)	36.8 (98.2)	37.2 (99.0)	37.2 (99.0)	36.4 (97.5)	36.0 (96.8)	41.8 (107.2)
Mean daily maximum °C (°F)	31.5 (88.7)	33.8 (92.8)	35.9 (96.6)	36.5 (97.7)	35.2 (95.4)	34.5 (94.1)	33.7 (92.7)	33.2 (91.8)	32.3 (90.1)	31.2 (88.2)	30.9 (87.6)	30.2 (86.4)	33.2 (91.8)
Daily mean °C (°F)	24.2 (75.6)	26.3 (79.3)	28.7 (83.7)	29.5 (85.1)	29.0 (84.2)	28.7 (83.7)	28.2 (82.8)	27.9 (82.2)	27.3 (81.1)	26.6 (79.9)	25.4 (77.7)	23.8 (74.8)	27.1 (80.8)
Mean daily minimum °C (°F)	18.1 (64.6)	19.9 (67.8)	22.8 (73.0)	24.2 (75.6)	24.7 (76.5)	24.8 (76.6)	24.4 (75.9)	24.3 (75.7)	24.0 (75.2)	23.1 (73.6)	20.8 (69.4)	18.4 (65.1)	22.5 (72.4)
Record low °C (°F)	9.4 (48.9)	10.7 (51.3)	11.6 (52.9)	18.8 (65.8)	19.8 (67.6)	21.6 (70.9)	21.2 (70.2)	21.1 (70.0)	20.0 (68.0)	16.3 (61.3)	12.2 (54.0)	7.8 (46.0)	7.8 (46.0)
Average precipitation mm (inches)	4.8 (0.19)	17.8 (0.70)	45.2 (1.78)	87.3 (3.44)	172.3 (6.78)	127.4 (5.02)	154.4 (6.08)	192.7 (7.59)	255.2 (10.05)	135.4 (5.33)	31.2 (1.23)	3.8 (0.15)	1,227.5 (48.33)
Average precipitation days (≥ 1.0 mm)	0.6	1.8	3.6	6.6	11.9	11.1	12.8	13.7	15.2	9.3	2.7	0.7	90.0
Average relative humidity (%)	69.4	66.0	66.3	70.2	77.3	77.3	78.5	80.0	84.3	82.7	76.2	71.6	75.0
Mean monthly sunshine hours	279.0	245.8	275.9	240.0	195.3	153.0	158.1	117.8	144.0	198.4	255.0	260.4	2,522.7
Mean daily sunshine hours	9.0	8.7	8.9	8.0	6.3	5.1	5.1	3.8	4.8	6.4	8.5	8.4	6.9
Source 1: World Meteorological Organization
Source 2: Office of Water Management and Hydrology, Royal Irrigation Department (sun 1981–2010)(extremes)

== Administration ==
The district is divided into 15 sub-districts (tambons), which are further subdivided into 204 villages (mubans). Nang Rong is a township (thesaban tambon) which covers parts of tambon Nang Rong and Thanon Hak. There are also 15 tambon administrative organizations (TAO).

No.	Name	Thai name	Villages	Pop.
1.	Nang Rong	นางรอง	30	22,934
3.	Sadao	สะเดา	17	9,624
5.	Chum Saeng	ชุมแสง	14	5,418
6.	Nong Bot	หนองโบสถ์	14	7,196
8.	Nong Kong	หนองกง	11	6,199
13.	Thanon Hak	ถนนหัก	13	10,073
14.	Nong Sai	หนองไทร	14	6,494
15.	Kan Lueang	ก้านเหลือง	10	4,573
16.	Ban Sing	บ้านสิงห์	14	5,503
17.	Lam Sai Yong	ลำไทรโยง	14	5,525
18.	Sap Phraya	ทรัพย์พระยา	13	6,924
24.	Nong Yai Phim	หนองยายพิมพ์	10	4,568
25.	Hua Thanon	หัวถนน	11	4,613
26.	Thung Saeng Thong	ทุ่งแสงทอง	7	3,099
27.	Nong Sano	หนองโสน	12	5,400

Missing numbers are tambon which now form the districts Non Suwan and Chamni, as well as parts of Chaloem Phra Kiat.
