= Soeng Sang district =

District of Thailand

Soeng Sang เสิงสาง
- District
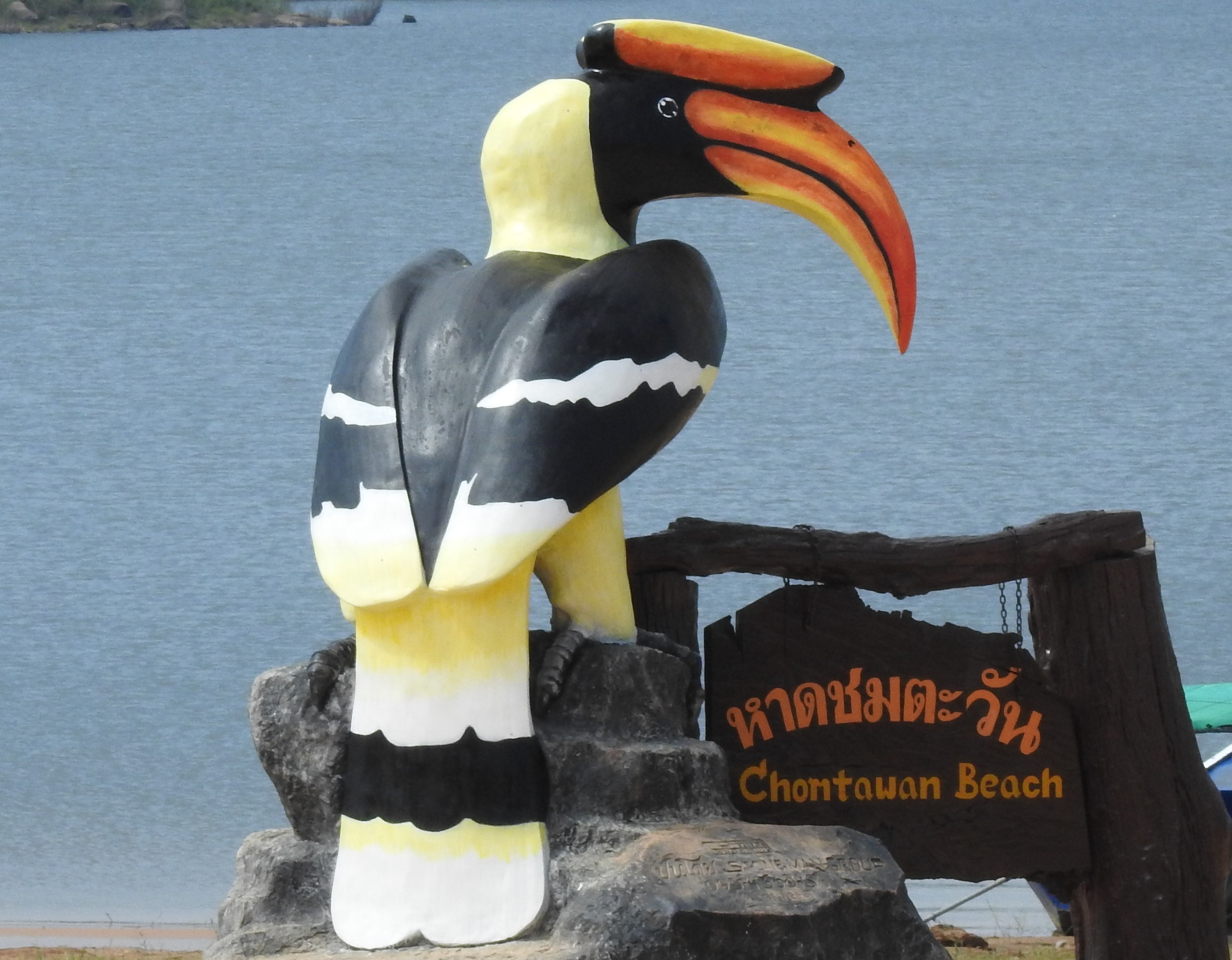
- Lam Plai Mat Reservoir at Thap Lan National Park

- District location in Nakhon Ratchasima province
- Coordinates: 14°25′34″N 102°27′38″E
- Country: Thailand
- Province: Nakhon Ratchasima
- Seat: Soeng Sang

Area
  - Total: 1,200.2 km^{2} (463.4 sq mi)

Population (2010)
  - Total: 68,387
  - Density: 53.6/km^{2} (139/sq mi)
- Time zone: UTC+7 (ICT)
- Postal code: 30330
- Geocode: 3003

Soeng Sang (Thai: เสิงสาง, pronounced [sɤ̌ːŋ sǎːŋ]) is a district (amphoe) in the southeastern part of Nakhon Ratchasima province, northeastern Thailand.

== Etymology ==
The meaning of the district name in Thai is 'dawn' or 'nearly dawn'. The city temple is called Wat Thung Rung Arun Si Soeng Sang.

== History ==
The area was separated from Khon Buri district and became a minor district (king amphoe) on 7 May 1976. The minor district originally consisted of a single tambon, Sa Takhian. It was upgraded to a full district on 25 March 1979.

== Geography ==
Neighbouring districts are (from the north clockwise): Nong Ki, Non Suwan, Pakham, and Non Din Daeng of Buriram province; Watthana Nakhon of Sa Kaeo province; and Khon Buri of Nakhon Ratchasima Province.

One of the main attractions in Soeng Sang is the Chomtawan Reservoir.

== Administration ==
The district is divided into six sub-districts (tambons), which are further subdivided into 84 villages (mubans). There are two townships (thesaban tambons), Soeng Sang and Non Sombun, both covering part of same-named tambon. Each of the sub-districts has a tambon administrative organization, responsible for the area not covered by the townships.

1.	Soeng Sang	เสิงสาง
2.	Sa Takhian	สระตะเคียน
3.	Non Sombun	โนนสมบูรณ์
4.	Kut Bot	กุดโบสถ์
5.	Suk Phaibun	สุขไพบูลย์
6.	Ban Rat	บ้านราษฎร์
