= Ta Phraya district =

Ta Phraya ตาพระยา
- District
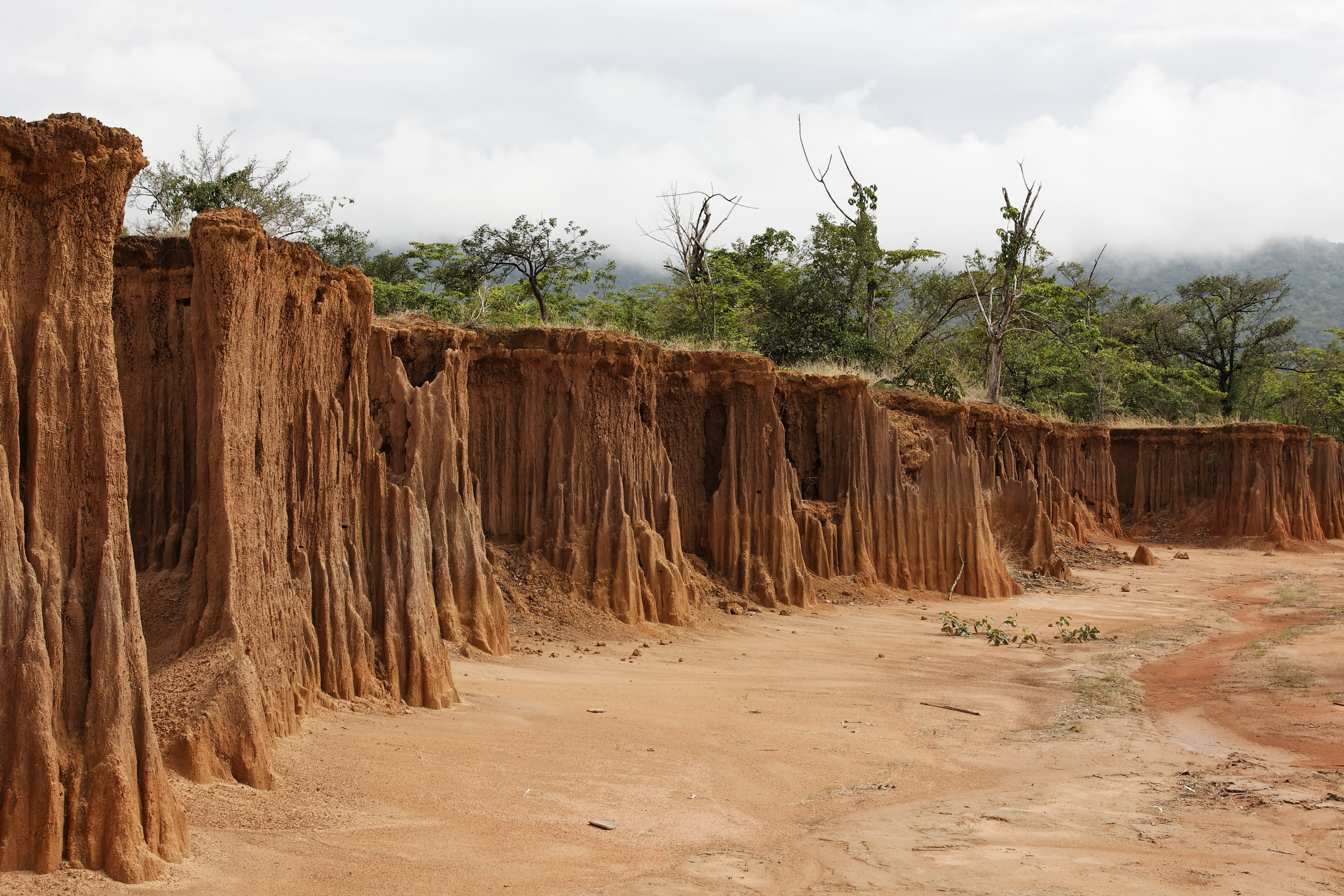
- Lalu, a local rock formations and tourist attraction

- District location in Sa Kaeo province
- Coordinates: 14°0′22″N 102°48′21″E
- Country: Thailand
- Province: Sa Kaeo
- Seat: Ta Phraya

Area
  - Total: 642.345 km^{2} (248.011 sq mi)

Population (2005)
  - Total: 52,284
  - Density: 81.4/km^{2} (211/sq mi)
- Time zone: UTC+7 (ICT)
- Postal code: 27180
- Geocode: 2703

Ta Phraya (Thai: ตาพระยา, pronounced [tāː pʰrā.jāː]) is the northeasternmost district (amphoe) of Sa Kaeo province, eastern Thailand.

== History ==
Two bodies of Khmer-language epigraphy place the district within the pre-Angkorian and then the Angkorian sphere. The inscription K. 969, from Prasat Khao Chong Sa Chaeng, records the excavation of a water tank, the Śaṅkara Taṭāka, and is attributed to Mahendravarman, who reigned in the early 7th century. Michael Vickery reads Mahendravarman's campaigns in this direction as exploratory probes that may have had little lasting political effect. Inscriptions of the 10th century name Rajendravarman: K. 957, found at Ban Phang Phuay and dated 941, and a royal edict recorded as K. 872, in which he claims victory over Ramanya and Champa. Patcharaporn Ngernkerd and colleagues read this group, with K. 233, K. 999 and K. 1152, as evidence that the northern part of Sa Kaeo was administered directly from Angkor.

In modern times the area was dense forest in Aranyaprathet district. Later people moved to there for agricultural work. When the community grew bigger, the government created the Ta Phraya minor district (king amphoe) in 1959. It was upgraded to a full district in 1963. This district gives its name to Ta Phraya National Park.

Kho Khlan Subdistrict in Ta Phraya district was the site of the Khao-I-Dang Cambodian refugee camp opened in the late 1970s during the Cambodian–Vietnamese War.

== Geography ==
Neighboring districts are (from the south clockwise), Khok Sung and Watthana Nakhon of Sa Kaeo Province, Non Din Daeng and Lahan Sai of Buriram province. To the east is Banteay Meanchey Province of Cambodia.

The Sankamphaeng Range mountainous area is in the northern section of this district.

== Administration ==
The district is divided into five sub-districts (tambons), which are further subdivided into 61 villages (mubans). Ta Phraya is a township (thesaban tambon) and covers parts of the tambon Ta Phraya. There are a further five tambon administrative organizations (TAO).

No.	Name	Thai name	Villages	Pop.
1.	Ta Phraya	ตาพระยา	17	15,132
2.	Thap Sadet	ทัพเสด็จ	13	7,929
6.	Thap Rat	ทัพราช	15	14,281
7.	Thap Thai	ทัพไทย	10	7,949
9.	Kho Khlan	โคคลาน	6	6,993

Missing numbers are tambon which now form Khok Sung District.
