= Khon Buri district =

District of Thailand

Khon Buri (Thai: ครบุรี,) is a district (amphoe) in the southern part of Nakhon Ratchasima province, northeastern Thailand.

== History ==
Khon Buri in Thai means 'origin of the river', which refers to one of tributaries of the Mun River. In the past it was called Ban Khon Buri. When the town grew, its name was changed to Mueang Khon and then Khon Buri.

In 1907, the area was a minor district (king amphoe) of Chok Chai district. It was called King Amphoe Chae because the city centre was in Tambon Chae.

As Tambon Khon Buri was very far from the center of Pak Thong Chai district, the government administered it together with Chae Sub-district in 1939. At the same time, it was officially upgraded to a full district and renamed Khon Buri.

== Geography ==
Neighbouring districts are (from the north clockwise): Chok Chai and Nong Bun Mak of Nakhon Ratchasima Province; Nong Ki of Buriram province; Soeng Sang of Nakhon Ratchasima; Watthana Nakhon and Mueang Sa Kaeo of Sa Kaeo province; Na Di of Prachinburi province; and Wang Nam Khiao and Pak Thong Chai of Nakhon Ratchasima.

The Sankamphaeng Range mountainous area is in the southern section of this district.

== Administration ==
The district is divided into 12 sub-districts (tambons). There are three townships (thesaban tambons) in the district: Chae and Chorakhe Hin, each covering parts of the same-named tambon, and Sai Yong-Chai Wan covering parts of tambons Khon Buri and Khon Buri Tai.

1.	Chae	แชะ
2.	Chaliang	เฉลียง
3.	Khon Buri	ครบุรี
4.	Khok Krachai	โคกกระชาย
5.	Chorakhe Hin	จระเข้หิน
6.	Map Tako En	มาบตะโกเอน
7.	Oraphim	อรพิมพ์
8.	Ban Mai	บ้านใหม่
9.	Lam Phiak	ลำเพียก
10.	Khon Buri Tai	ครบุรีใต้
11.	Tabaek Ban	ตะแบกบาน
12.	Sa Wan Phraya	สระว่านพระยา
