= Chamni district =

Chamni ชำนิ
- District
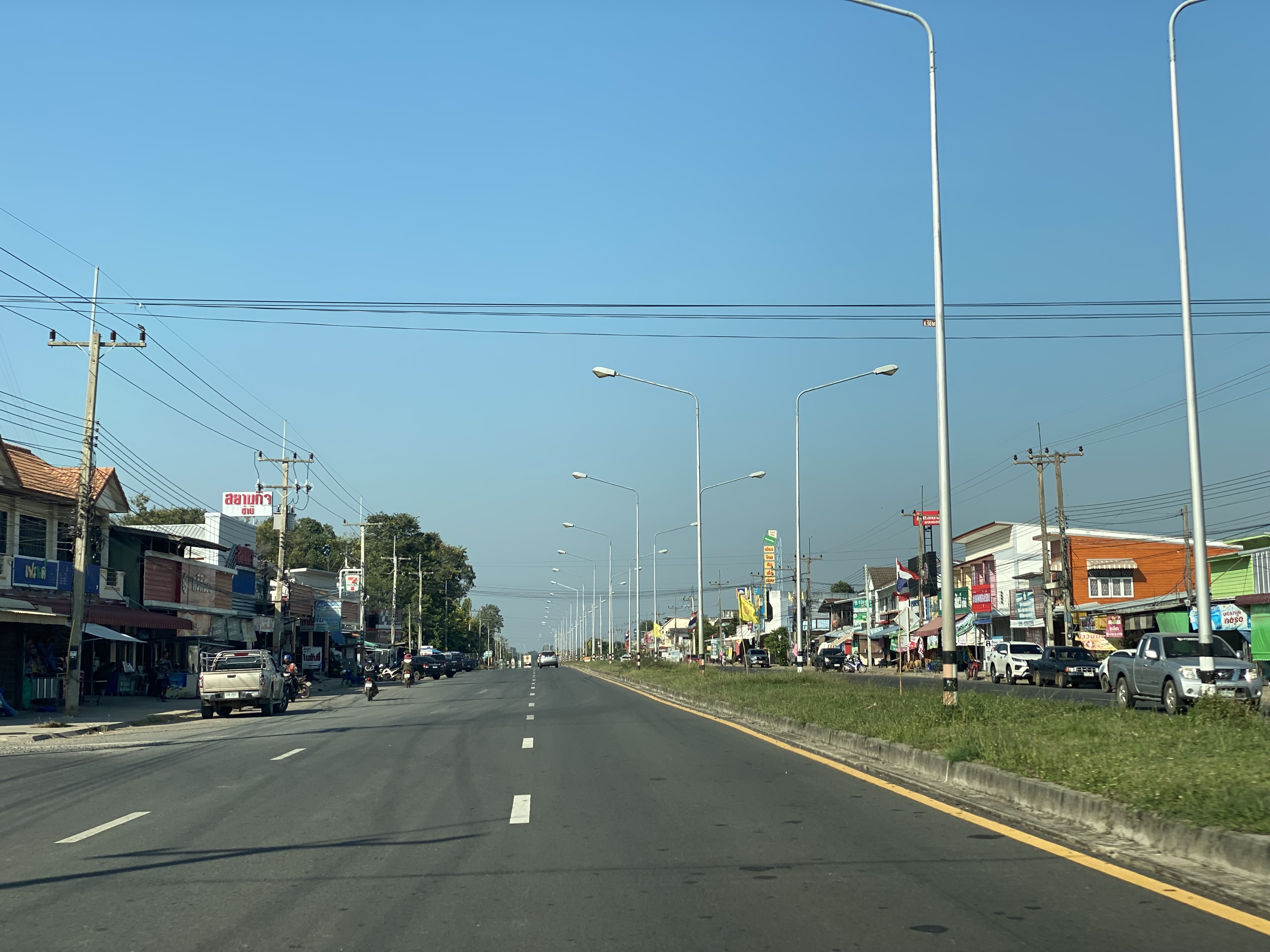

- District location in Buriram province
- Coordinates: 14°47′18″N 102°50′30″E
- Country: Thailand
- Province: Buriram
- Seat: Mueang Yang

Area
  - Total: 243.1 km^{2} (93.9 sq mi)

Population (2005)
  - Total: 33,646
  - Density: 138.4/km^{2} (358/sq mi)
- Time zone: UTC+7 (ICT)
- Postal code: 31110
- Geocode: 3118

Chamni (Thai: ชำนิ, pronounced [tɕʰām.níʔ]; Northeastern Thai: ชำนิ, pronounced [sâm.nìʔ]) is a district (amphoe) in the central part of Buriram province, northeastern Thailand.

== Geography ==
Neighboring districts are (from the north clockwise) Lam Plai Mat, Mueang Buriram, Nang Rong, Nong Ki and Nong Hong of Buriram Province.

== History ==
The minor district (king amphoe) was created on 1 April 1992, when the five tambons: Chamni, Cho Phaka, Laluat, Mueang Yang, and Nong Plong were split off from Nang Rong district. It was upgraded to a full district on 5 December 1996.

== Motto ==
The Chamni District's motto is "The three brook city, have many fish, jasmine rice, Chamnit Buddha image."

== Administration ==
The district is divided into six sub-districts (tambons), which are further subdivided into 64 villages (mubans). There are no municipal (thesaban) areas, and six tambon administrative organizations (TAO).

No.	Name	Thai name	Villages	Pop.
1.	Chamni	ชำนิ	8	4,644
2.	Nong Plong	หนองปล่อง	10	5,480
3.	Mueang Yang	เมืองยาง	14	7,248
4.	Cho Phaka	ช่อผกา	13	6,856
5.	Laluat	ละลวด	11	5,759
6.	Khok Sanuan	โคกสนวน	8	3,659
