= Pakham district =

Pakham ปะคำ
- District
- District location in Buriram province
- Coordinates: 14°26′18″N 102°43′32″E
- Country: Thailand
- Province: Buriram
- Seat: Pakham

Area
  - Total: 296.029 km^{2} (114.297 sq mi)

Population (2005)
  - Total: 43,446
  - Density: 146.8/km^{2} (380/sq mi)
- Time zone: UTC+7 (ICT)
- Postal code: 31220
- Geocode: 3112

Pakham (Thai: ปะคำ, pronounced [pā.kʰām]) is a district (amphoe) in the southwestern part of Buriram province, northeastern Thailand.

== Geography ==
Neighboring districts are (from the north clockwise) Non Suwan, Nang Rong, Lahan Sai, Non Din Daeng of Buriram Province and Soeng Sang of Nakhon Ratchasima province.

== History ==
The minor district (king amphoe) was created on 1 December 1978, when the three tambons Pakham, Thai Charoen, and Nong Bua were split off from Lahan Sai district. It was upgraded to a full district on 15 March 1985.

== Motto ==
The Pakham District's motto is "Golden Buddha image, The inscription millennium, Pakham Mahout and prosperous of civilization."

== Administration ==
The district is divided into five sub-districts (tambons), which are further subdivided into 74 villages (mubans). Pakham is a township (thesaban tambon) which covers parts of tambon Pakham. There are also five tambon administrative organizations (TAO).

No.	Name	Thai name	Villages	Pop.
1.	Pakham	ปะคำ	9	6,782
2.	Thai Charoen	ไทยเจริญ	14	6,922
3.	Nong Bua	หนองบัว	11	5,914
4.	Khok Mamuang	โคกมะม่วง	21	13,165
5.	Hu Thamnop	หูทำนบ	19	10,663
