= Phloi Waen =

Tambon of Tha Mai, Chanthaburi

Coordinates: 12.60677°N 102.038807°E

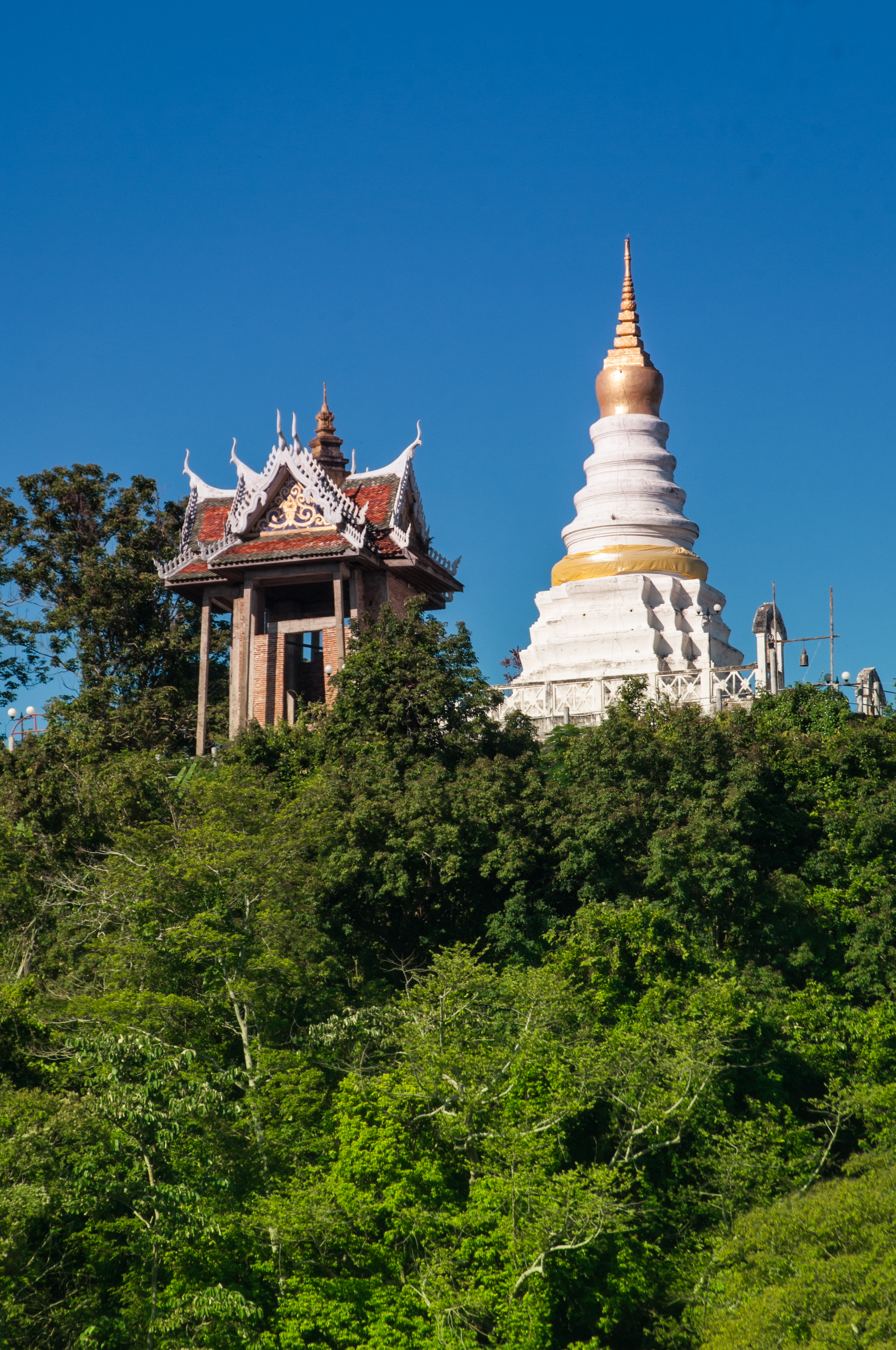
Wat Khao Phloi Waen

Phloi Waen (Thai: พลอยแหวน, pronounced [pʰlɔ̄ːj wɛːn˩˩˦]) is a tambon (subdistrict) of Tha Mai district, Chanthaburi province.

== History ==
Phloi Waen (lit. 'gemstone ring'), this name used to be a district called Phloi Waen district. It was named after a hill with a Buddhist temple on top, Khao Phloi Waen. The hill got this name because it was the first ruby mine in Chanthaburi. According to the survey, lots of rubies and sapphires were found around the hill's area. That was where the famous rubies of Chanthaburi started, and continues to the present.

Later, in 1917 the district office was moved to Tha Mai's area, the district name was changed to be same as the central subdistrict since then.

== Geography ==
Phloi Waen is located in the northern part of the district, covering an area of approximately 10.50 km^{2} and approximately 6 km (3.7 mi) from the district centre, with approximately 10 km (6.2 mi) from the downtown Chanthaburi.

== Administration ==
The area is under the administration of Khao Wua-Phloi Waen Subdistrict Municipality in conjunction with the neighbouring, Khao Wua.

It is also consists of seven administrative mubans (villages).

No.	Name	Thai
1.	Ban Pong Rak	บ้านโป่งรัก
2.	Ban Rai Sung	บ้านไร่สูง
3.	Ban Cham Kho Bon	บ้านชำฆ้อบน
4.	Ban Huai Rakam	บ้านห้วยระกำ
5.	Ban Sa Kaeo	บ้านสระแก้ว
6.	Ban Cham Kho Lang	บ้านชำฆ้อล่าง
7.	Ban Na Bon Noen	บ้านนาบนเนิน

== Population ==
It has a total population of 1,721 (846 men, 875 women) in 828 households.
