= Wang Nam Yen district =

Wang Nam Yen วังน้ำเย็น
- District
- District location in Sa Kaeo province
- Coordinates: 13°29′59″N 102°10′55″E
- Country: Thailand
- Province: Sa Kaeo
- Seat: Wang Nam Yen

Area
  - Total: 325.05 km^{2} (125.50 sq mi)

Population (2005)
  - Total: 62,059
  - Density: 190.9/km^{2} (494/sq mi)
- Time zone: UTC+7 (ICT)
- Postal code: 27210
- Geocode: 2704

Wang Nam Yen (Thai: วังน้ำเย็น, pronounced [wāŋ ná(ː)m jēn]) is a district (amphoe) in the southern part of Sa Kaeo province, eastern Thailand.

== History ==
In 1971 the government built a new road connecting Chanthaburi province with Sa Kaeo province. Then the people from Ban Tha Ta Si and Ban Nong Prue moved to establish a new village along the new road in the area. They named the new village Ban Wang Nam Yen after their important water resource. It was upgraded to Tambon Wang Nam Yen of Sa Kaeo district in 1975. 1 In December 1976 the minor district (king amphoe) Wang Nam Yen was created, consisting of the three tambons Wang Nam Yen, Wang Sombun, and Ta Lang Nai. Wang Nam Yen was upgraded to a full district on 1 April 1983.

== Geography ==
Neighboring districts are (from the north clockwise) Khao Chakan, Watthana Nakhon, Khlong Hat, and Wang Sombun of Sa Kaeo province and Tha Takiap of Chachoengsao province.

== Administration ==
The district is divided into four sub-districts (tambons), which are further subdivided into 84 villages (mubans). Wang Nam Yen is a township (thesaban tambon) which covers tambon Wang Nam Yen. There are a further three tambon administrative organizations (TAO).

No.	Name	Thai name	Villages	Pop.
1.	Wang Nam Yen	วังน้ำเย็น	19	21,598
3.	Ta Lang Nai	ตาหลังใน	21	12,882
5.	Khlong Hin Pun	คลองหินปูน	16	9,492
6.	Thung Maha Charoen	ทุ่งมหาเจริญ	28	18,087

Missing numbers are tambon which now form Wang Sombun District.

== Economy ==
Wang Nam Yen is one of Thailand's key dairy-producing regions, and it is home to a dairy cooperative.
