= Non Suwan district =

Non Suwan โนนสุวรรณ
- District
- District location in Buriram province
- Coordinates: 14°34′42″N 102°35′54″E
- Country: Thailand
- Province: Buriram
- Seat: Non Suwan

Area
  - Total: 189.4 km^{2} (73.1 sq mi)

Population (2005)
  - Total: 23,170
  - Density: 122.3/km^{2} (317/sq mi)
- Time zone: UTC+7 (ICT)
- Postal code: 31110
- Geocode: 3117

Non Suwan (Thai: โนนสุวรรณ, pronounced [nōːn sù.wān]) is a district (amphoe) in the western part of Buriram province, northeastern Thailand.

== Geography ==
Neighboring districts are (from the north clockwise) Nong Ki, Nang Rong, Pakham of Buriram Province and Soeng Sang of Nakhon Ratchasima province.

== History ==
The minor district (king amphoe) was created on 1 April 1991, when four tambons were split off from Nang Rong district. It was upgraded to a full district on 8 September 1995.

== Motto ==
The Non Suwan District's motto is "The city farm plants, sweet fruit, beautiful silk, rocket festival, dairy cattle, many of rubber, and Olympic gold medal boxer."

== Administration ==
The district is divided into four sub-districts (tambons), which are further subdivided into 56 villages (mubans). Non Suwan is a township (thesaban tambon) which covers parts of tambons Non Suwan and Krok Kaeo. There are also four tambon administrative organizations (TAO).

No.	Name	Thai name	Villages	Pop.
1.	Non Suwan	โนนสุวรรณ	17	6,578
2.	Thung Changhan	ทุ่งจังหัน	14	5,513
3.	Krok Kaeo	โกรกแก้ว	12	5,408
4.	Dong I Chan	ดงอีจาน	13	5,671
