= Nong Ki district =

Nong Ki หนองกี่
- District
- District location in Buriram province
- Coordinates: 14°41′17″N 102°32′2″E
- Country: Thailand
- Province: Buriram
- Seat: Thung Kratat Phatthana

Area
  - Total: 385.0 km^{2} (148.6 sq mi)

Population (2005)
  - Total: 67,658
  - Density: 175.7/km^{2} (455/sq mi)
- Time zone: UTC+7 (ICT)
- Postal code: 31210
- Geocode: 3105

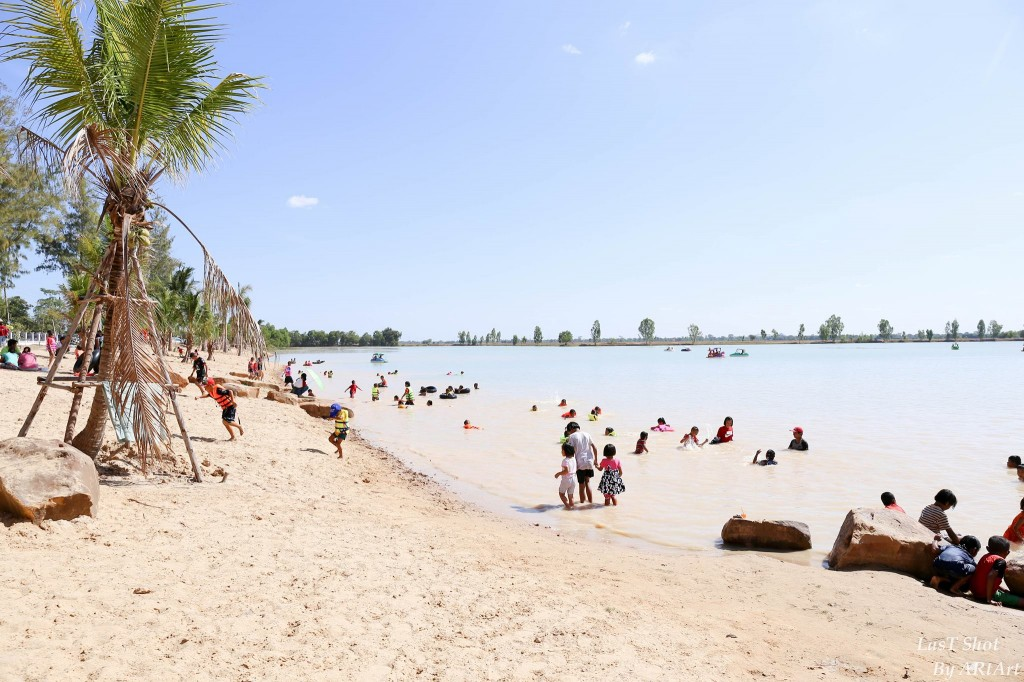
Prasattong Beach, a local popular attraction

Nong Ki (Thai: หนองกี่, pronounced [nɔ̌ːŋ kìː]) is the westernmost district (amphoe) of Buriram province, northeastern Thailand. The district lies approximately 80 km southwest of Buriram City.

== Geography ==
Neighbouring districts are (from the northeast clockwise) Nong Hong, Chamni, Nang Rong, Non Suwan of Buriram Province, Soeng Sang, Khon Buri, and Nong Bun Mak of Nakhon Ratchasima province.

== History ==
The minor district (king amphoe) was created on 1 March 1974, when the three tambons Nong Ki, Yoei Prasat, and Mueang Phai were split off from Nang Rong district. It was upgraded to a full district on 12 April 1977.

== Motto ==
The Nong Ki District's motto is "The city of boxer, delicious grilled chicken, beautiful silk, rich of culture, and nature of Huai Yang Dam and Tung Kra Ten Reservoirs."

== Administration ==
The district is divided into 10 sub-districts (tambons), which are further subdivided into 123 villages (mubans). Nong Ki is a township (thesaban tambon) which covers parts of tambons Nong Ki, Thung Kratat Phatthana, and Thung Kraten. There are also 10 tambon administrative organizations (TAO).

No.	Name	Thai name	Villages	Pop.
1.	Nong Ki	หนองกี่	23	5,039
2.	Yoei Prasat	เย้ยปราสาท	10	5,748
3.	Mueang Phai	เมืองไผ่	18	9,563
4.	Don Arang	ดอนอะราง	15	10,406
5.	Khok Sawang	โคกสว่าง	9	5,510
6.	Thung Kratat Phatthana	ทุ่งกระตาดพัฒนา	12	8,105
7.	Thung Kraten	ทุ่งกระเต็น	9	6,565
8.	Tha Pho Chai	ท่าโพธิ์ชัย	9	4,351
9.	Khok Sung	โคกสูง	8	6,458
10.	Bu Krasang	บุกระสัง	10	5,913

== Notable people ==
- Namphon Nongkee Pahuyuth, Muay Thai fighter
- Namkabuan Nongkee Pahuyuth, Muay Thai fighter
