= Tha Mai subdistrict, Chanthaburi =

Tha Mai ท่าใหม่
- Tambon
- Country: Thailand
- Province: Chanthaburi
- Amphoe: Tha Mai

Population (2017)
  - Total: 8,137
- Time zone: UTC+7 (TST)
- Postal code: 22120
- TIS 1099: 220301

Tha Mai (Thai: ท่าใหม่, pronounced [tʰâː màj]) is a tambon (subdistrict) of Tha Mai District, in Chanthaburi Province, Thailand. In 2017 it had a total population of 8,137 people.

== Administration ==
=== Central administration ===
The tambon has no administrative villages (muban).

=== Local administration ===
The whole area of the subdistrict is covered by the town (Thesaban Mueang) Tha Mai (เทศบาลเมืองท่าใหม่).
