= Lalu (Thailand) =

- Rock formation
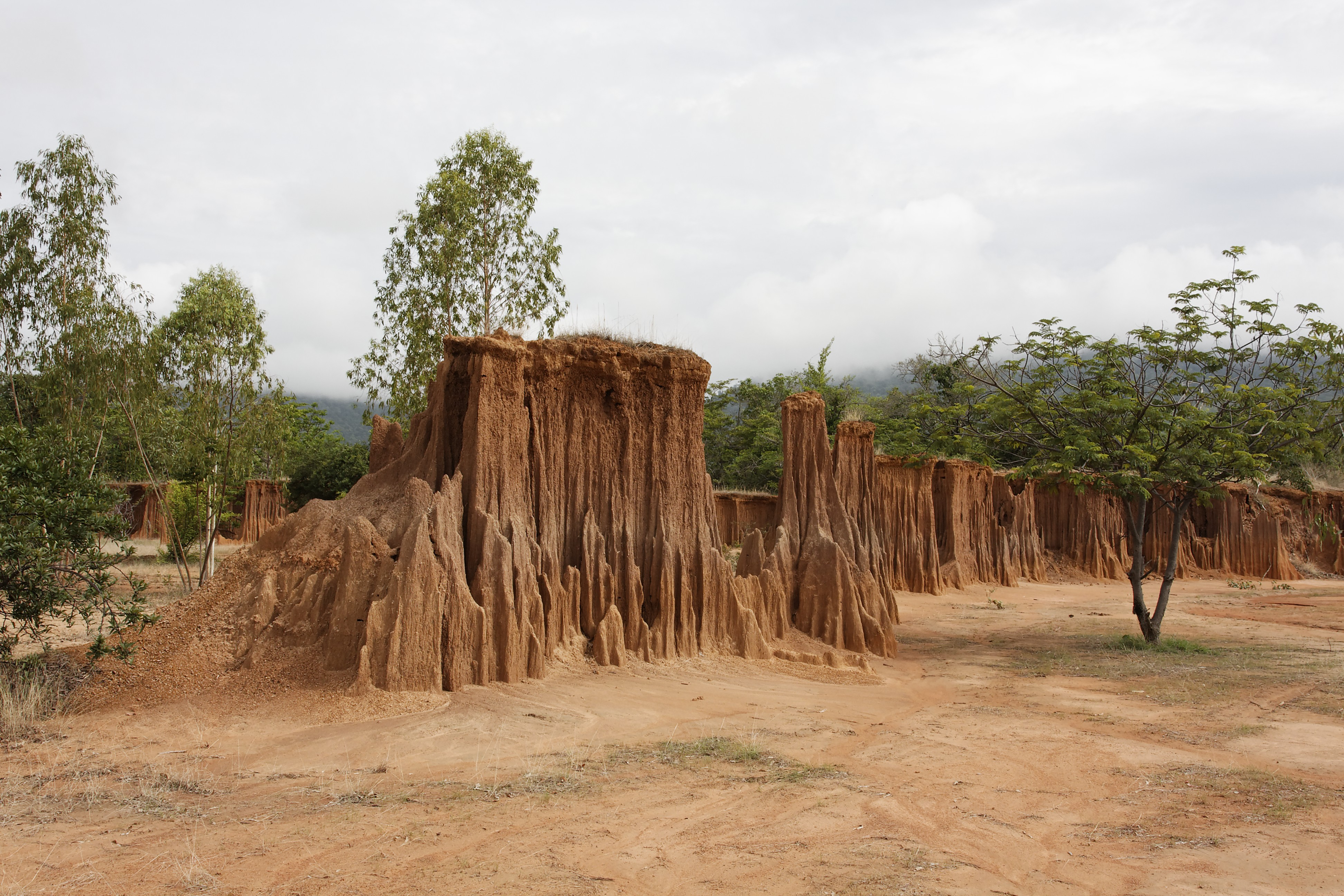

- Location in Thailand
- Coordinates: 14°03′05″N 102°34′31″E
- Location: Sa Kaeo, Thailand

Lalu (Thai: ละลุ, pronounced [lā.lúʔ]) is a natural rock formations caused by erosion. The area of Lalu is more than 2,000 rais (790 acres) covers Ban Khlong Yang and Ban Noen Kham, Thap Rat Sub-district in Ta Phraya District, Sa Kaeo Province, eastern Thailand near the Dângrêk Mountains, a natural border with Cambodia.

It is a natural phenomenon resulting from rain erosion, land subsidence etc. Due to the hardness of the soil, wind erosion could only leave it with various patterns and forms. Lalu looks like a Phae Mueang Phi of Phrae Province, but smaller in size and have a colour that is reddish or darker.

The name "Lalu" is Khmer language means "penetrated". The landscape and colour of Lalu change from year to year with erosion of the rainwater and the wind blowing. Therefore, it known as "Grand Canyon of Thailand".

To reach Lalu, visitors can take a itaek (Thai-style tractor) of locals to visit.

== See more ==
- Phae Mueang Phi – similar natural rock formations
