= Watthana Nakhon district =

Watthana Nakhon วัฒนานคร
- District
- District location in Sa Kaeo province
- Coordinates: 13°44′52″N 102°18′27″E
- Country: Thailand
- Province: Sa Kaeo
- Seat: Watthana Nakhon

Area
  - Total: 1,560.122 km^{2} (602.366 sq mi)

Population (2008)
  - Total: 79,856
  - Density: 51.1/km^{2} (132/sq mi)
- Time zone: UTC+7 (ICT)
- Postal code: 27160
- Geocode: 2705

Watthana Nakhon (Thai: วัฒนานคร, pronounced [wát.tʰā.nāː ná(ʔ).kʰɔ̄ːn]) is a district (amphoe) in the central part of Sa Kaeo province, eastern Thailand.

== History ==
Watthana Nakhon is an ancient city. Established before 1917 and originally named Watthana, it was a minor district (king amphoe) in the Aranyaprathet district, until it was upgraded to a full district on 6 June 1956.

== Geography ==
Neighboring districts are (from the east clockwise) Ta Phraya, Khok Sung, Aranyaprathet, Khlong Hat, Wang Nam Yen, Khao Chakan, Mueang Sa Kaeo of Sa Kaeo Province, Khon Buri, Soeng Sang of Nakhon Ratchasima province and Non Din Daeng of Buriram province. The Sankamphaeng Range mountainous area is in the northern section of this district.

== Administration ==
The district is divided into 11 sub-districts (tambons), which are further subdivided into 115 villages (mubans). Watthana Nakhon is a sub-district municipality (thesaban tambon) and covers parts of tambon Watthana Nakhon. There are a further 11 tambon administrative organizations (TAO).

No.	Name	Thai	Villages	Pop.
1.	Watthana Nakhon	วัฒนานคร	14	13,503
2.	Tha Kwian	ท่าเกวียน	14	10,224
3.	Phak Kha	ผักขะ	13	5,401
4.	Non Mak Kheng	โนนหมากเค็ง	9	5,289
5.	Nong Nam Sai	หนองน้ำใส	9	6,584
6.	Chong Kum	ช่องกุ่ม	9	5,787
7.	Nong Waeng	หนองแวง	7	3,831
8.	Sae-o	แซร์ออ	14	10,760
9.	Nong Mak Fai	หนองหมากฝ้าย	8	5,934
10.	Nong Takhian Bon	หนองตะเคียนบอน	10	6,477
11.	Huai Chot	ห้วยโจด	6	6,066
