= Khlong Hat district =

Khlong Hat คลองหาด
- District
- District location in Sa Kaeo province
- Coordinates: 13°26′56″N 102°17′59″E
- Country: Thailand
- Province: Sa Kaeo
- Seat: Khlong Hat

Area
  - Total: 417.082 km^{2} (161.036 sq mi)

Population (31 March 2004)
  - Total: 35,360
  - Density: 84.8/km^{2} (220/sq mi)
- Time zone: UTC+7 (ICT)
- Postal code: 27260
- Geocode: 2702

Khlong Hat (Thai: คลองหาด, pronounced [kʰlɔ̄ːŋ hàːt]) is the southeasternmost district (amphoe) of Sa Kaeo province, eastern Thailand.

== History ==
The area originally was a forest with plenty of Mahat (Thai: มะหาด) or Lakooch tree (Artocarpus lakoocha) along the canals (khlong). When people moved there, they named the village Ban Khlong Mahat. Later the name was shortened to Ban Khlong Hat. In 1984 Cambodian refugees fleeing from the civil war migrated to the area of Khlong Hat. The Thai government separated the four sub-districts Khlong Hat, Thai Udom, Sap Makrut, and Sai Diao from Watthana Nakhon district and created a minor district (king amphoe) for better administration, effective 15 January 1985. It was upgraded to a full district on 21 May 1990.

== Geography ==
Neighboring districts are (from the south clockwise) Soi Dao of Chanthaburi province, Wang Sombun, Wang Nam Yen, Watthana Nakhon, and Aranyaprathet of Sa Kaeo Province. To the east is Battambang province of Cambodia.

A border crossing into Cambodia is in the eastern part of the district near the village of Ban Khao Din. The checkpoint on the Cambodian side of the border is in the town of Sampov Loun.

== Administration ==
The district is divided into seven sub-districts (tambons), which are further subdivided into 69 villages (mubans). There are no municipal (thesaban) areas. There are a further seven tambon administrative organizations (TAO).

No.	Name	Thai name	Villages	Pop.
1.	Khlong Hat	คลองหาด	13	9,206
2.	Thai Udom	ไทยอุดม	9	4,295
3.	Sap Makrut	ซับมะกรูด	11	4,692
4.	Sai Diao	ไทรเดี่ยว	9	3,871
5.	Khlong Kai Thuean	คลองไก่เถื่อน	11	5,797
6.	Benchakhon	เบญจขร	10	4,249
7.	Sai Thong	ไทรทอง	8	3,250
