= Chaloem Burapha Chonlathit Road =

Road in eastern Thailand

Coordinates: 12°35′28.26″N 101°52′51.86″E

Sign of the road

Chaloem Burapha Chonlathit Road (Thai: ถนนเฉลิมบูรพาชลทิต, RTGS: Thanon Chaloem Burapha Chonlathit, pronounced [tʰā.nǒn t͡ɕʰā.lɤ̌ːm būː.rā.pʰāː t͡ɕʰōn.lā.tʰít]) or Rural Road RY 4036 (ทางหลวงชนบท รย.4036) is a road in eastern Thailand maintained by Department of Rural Roads.

Chaloem Burapha Chonlathit is a two-lane road. It starts from Chak Makrut Junction, where it meets Highway 3161 and ends at Chaloem Burapha Chonlathit Junction, where it meets Highway 3149, total distance of 100 km (62 mi).

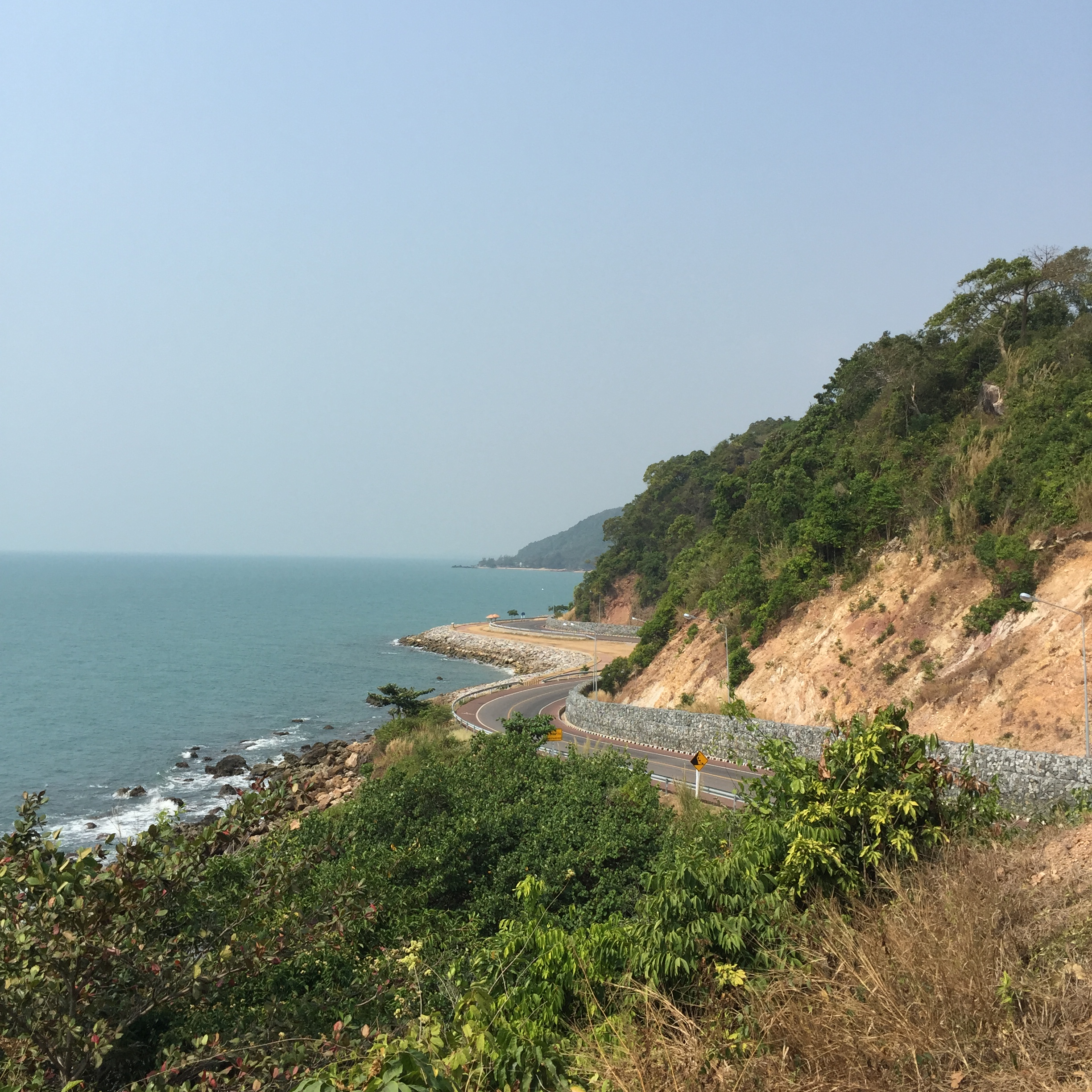
The road at Noen Nang Phaya, a popular viewpoint

The old main road was extended to connect with the new one. The road is extended by Department of Rural Roads in Ministry of Transport covering from Chonburi Province, Mae Phim Cape in Rayong Province, Chanthaburi to Trat Provinces as a scenic route and as to decrease usage of the cars on Sukhumvit Road. Moreover, Chaloem Burapha Chonlathit Road is suitable for driving and riding bicycle for admiring its scenic view. There is a bicycle way on the pavement of which painting is red.

The road is popular for sightseeing, and is used as a backdrop in some movies or advertisements. Moreover, Noen Nang Phaya is also a popular place for young lovers to lock the keys together.
