= Khao Khitchakut district =

Khao Khitchakut เขาคิชฌกูฏ
- District
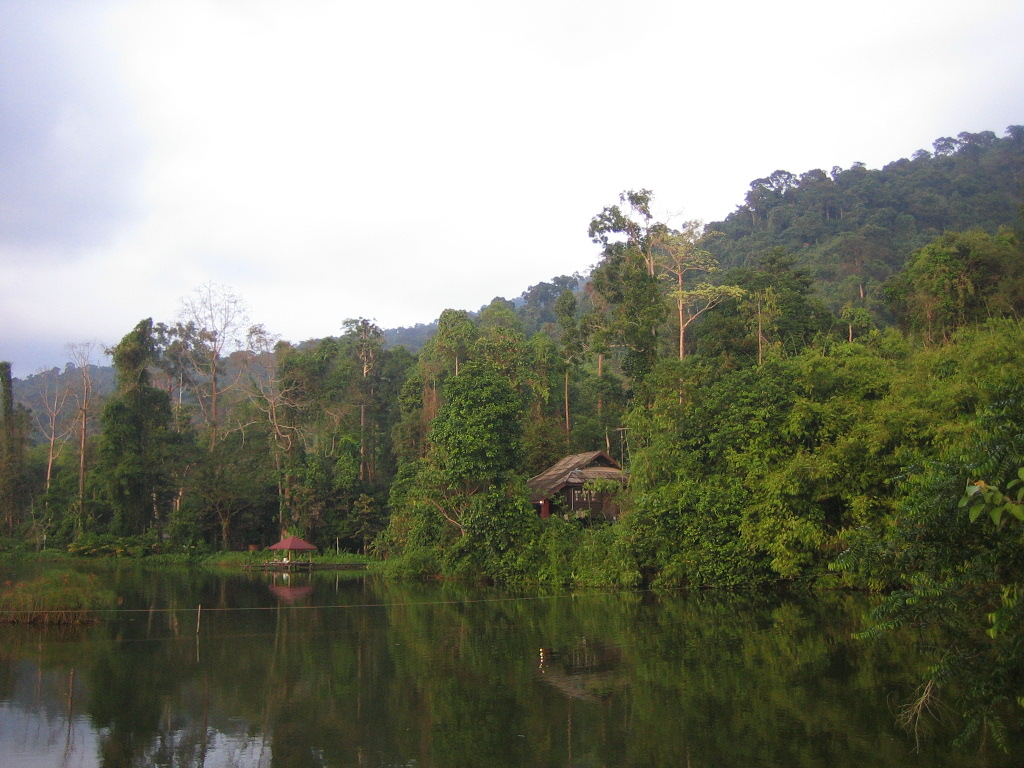
- Khao Khitchakut National Park

- District location in Chanthaburi province
- Coordinates: 12°48′16″N 102°6′53″E
- Country: Thailand
- Province: Chanthaburi
- Seat: Phluang

Area
  - Total: 830.2 km^{2} (320.5 sq mi)

Population (2023)
  - Total: 29,282
  - Density: 35.27/km^{2} (91.3/sq mi)
- Time zone: UTC+7 (ICT)
- Postal code: 22210
- Geocode: 2210

Khao Khitchakut (Thai: เขาคิชฌกูฏ, pronounced [kʰǎw kʰít.t͡ɕʰā.kùːt]) is a district (amphoe) in the central part of Chanthaburi province, eastern Thailand.

== History ==
The area was separated from Makham district and created as a minor district (king amphoe) on 1 July 1993.

On 15 May 2007 it was upgraded to a full district. With publication in the Royal Gazette on 24 August, the upgrade became official.

== Geography ==
Neighboring districts are (from the west clockwise) Kaeng Hang Maeo, Soi Dao, Pong Nam Ron, Makham, Mueang Chanthaburi, and Tha Mai of Chanthaburi Province.

The important water resource is the Chanthaburi River, which originates within Khao Khitchakut National Park.

== Administration ==
The district is divided into five communes (tambons), which are further subdivided into 46 villages (mubans). There are no municipalities (thesabans). There are five tambon administrative organizations (TAO).

| No. | Name | Thai name | Villages | Pop. |
|---|---|---|---|---|
| 1. | Chak Thai | ชากไทย | 8 | 4,149 |
| 2. | Phluang | พลวง | 9 | 6,559 |
| 3. | Takhian Thong | ตะเคียนทอง | 9 | 4,238 |
| 4. | Khlong Phlu | คลองพลู | 10 | 5,828 |
| 5. | Chanthakhlem | จันทเขลม | 10 | 5,166 |
