= Sa Kaeo =

- Town
- Location within Thailand
- Coordinates: 13°49′14″N 102°03′32″E
- Country: Thailand
- Province: Sa Kaeo province
- District: Mueang Sa Kaeo district

Population (2005)
  - Total: 16,591
- Time zone: UTC+7 (ICT)

Sa Kaeo (Thai: สระแก้ว, pronounced [sàʔ kɛ̂ːw]) is a town (thesaban mueang) in Thailand, about 48 kilometers from the Thai-Cambodian border and 200 km east of Bangkok. It is the capital of Sa Kaeo province. As of 2005, it had a population of 16,591. The town covers 11 sub-districts (tambon).

From 1979–1980, Sa Kaeo was the site of the Sa Kaeo Refugee Camp.

== Climate ==
Climate data for Sa Kaeo (1981–2010, extremes 1998-present)
| Month | Jan | Feb | Mar | Apr | May | Jun | Jul | Aug | Sep | Oct | Nov | Dec | Year |
|---|---|---|---|---|---|---|---|---|---|---|---|---|---|
| Record high °C (°F) | 37.2 (99.0) | 39.2 (102.6) | 40.9 (105.6) | 42.5 (108.5) | 40.9 (105.6) | 37.3 (99.1) | 37.4 (99.3) | 36.0 (96.8) | 35.4 (95.7) | 34.6 (94.3) | 36.6 (97.9) | 35.5 (95.9) | 42.5 (108.5) |
| Mean daily maximum °C (°F) | 32.6 (90.7) | 34.4 (93.9) | 35.5 (95.9) | 36.2 (97.2) | 34.5 (94.1) | 33.6 (92.5) | 32.8 (91.0) | 32.5 (90.5) | 32.3 (90.1) | 32.2 (90.0) | 32.1 (89.8) | 31.7 (89.1) | 33.4 (92.1) |
| Daily mean °C (°F) | 25.7 (78.3) | 27.6 (81.7) | 28.8 (83.8) | 29.6 (85.3) | 28.6 (83.5) | 28.2 (82.8) | 27.7 (81.9) | 27.6 (81.7) | 27.3 (81.1) | 27.2 (81.0) | 26.3 (79.3) | 25.1 (77.2) | 27.5 (81.5) |
| Mean daily minimum °C (°F) | 20.0 (68.0) | 22.2 (72.0) | 24.1 (75.4) | 25.3 (77.5) | 25.3 (77.5) | 25.1 (77.2) | 24.7 (76.5) | 24.7 (76.5) | 24.5 (76.1) | 24.1 (75.4) | 22.0 (71.6) | 19.8 (67.6) | 23.5 (74.3) |
| Record low °C (°F) | 11.4 (52.5) | 13.0 (55.4) | 14.4 (57.9) | 22.0 (71.6) | 23.0 (73.4) | 22.5 (72.5) | 22.1 (71.8) | 22.1 (71.8) | 21.6 (70.9) | 19.0 (66.2) | 14.7 (58.5) | 9.0 (48.2) | 9.0 (48.2) |
| Average rainfall mm (inches) | 9.9 (0.39) | 27.5 (1.08) | 55.7 (2.19) | 88.7 (3.49) | 179.3 (7.06) | 176.2 (6.94) | 198.4 (7.81) | 216.1 (8.51) | 266.8 (10.50) | 162.6 (6.40) | 26.5 (1.04) | 5.0 (0.20) | 1,412.7 (55.62) |
| Average rainy days | 2.1 | 3.1 | 7.8 | 9.3 | 17.9 | 17.5 | 20.0 | 19.8 | 19.9 | 14.8 | 4.8 | 1.0 | 138.0 |
| Average relative humidity (%) | 68 | 69 | 72 | 75 | 83 | 84 | 85 | 86 | 87 | 84 | 76 | 71 | 78 |
| Mean monthly sunshine hours | 282.1 | 245.8 | 238.7 | 204.0 | 155.0 | 153.0 | 117.8 | 114.7 | 108.0 | 182.9 | 255.0 | 279.0 | 2,336 |
| Mean daily sunshine hours | 9.1 | 8.7 | 7.7 | 6.8 | 5.0 | 5.1 | 3.8 | 3.7 | 3.6 | 5.9 | 8.5 | 9.0 | 6.4 |
Source 1: Thai Meteorological Department
Source 2: Office of Water Management and Hydrology, Royal Irrigation Department (sun and humidity)
