= Mueang Sa Kaeo district =

Mueang Sa Kaeo เมืองสระแก้ว
- District
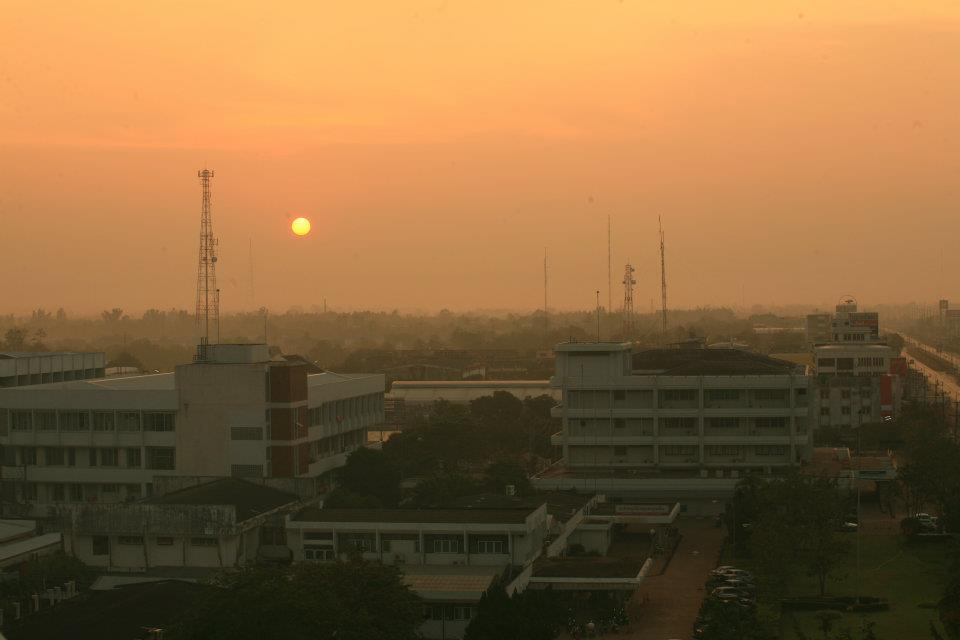
- Mueang Sa Kaeo in the dusk

- District location in Sa Kaeo province
- Coordinates: 13°48′53″N 102°4′19″E
- Country: Thailand
- Province: Sa Kaeo

Area
  - Total: 1,832.034 km^{2} (707.352 sq mi)

Population (2008)
  - Total: 107,092
  - Density: 58/km^{2} (150/sq mi)
- Time zone: UTC+7 (ICT)
- Postal code: 27000
- Geocode: 2701

Amphoe Mueang Sa Kaeo (Thai: เมืองสระแก้ว) is the capital district (amphoe mueang) of Sa Kaeo province, eastern Thailand.

== Geography ==
Neighboring districts are (from the north clockwise) Khon Buri of Nakhon Ratchasima province, Watthana Nakhon and Khao Chakan of Sa Kaeo, and Kabin Buri and Na Di of Prachinburi province.

The Sankamphaeng Range mountainous area is in the northern section of this district, within its forested hills at the boundary between Sa Kaeo and Prachinburi Province is the Pang Sida National Park.

== History ==
In 1909 the minor district (king amphoe) Sa Kaeo was established as a subordinate of Kabin Buri district. It was upgraded to a full district on 23 July 1958. When in 1993 the new province Sa Kaeo was created, the district became the capital district of the province and was therefore renamed Mueang Sa Kaeo.

== Administration ==
The district is divided into eight sub-districts (tambons), which are further subdivided into 124 villages (mubans). Sa Kaeo itself has town status (thesaban mueang) and covers parts of tambons Sa Kaeo and Tha Kasem. There are also two sub-district municipalities (thesaban tambons): Tha Kasem and Sala Lamduan both covering parts of the same-named tambons. There are a further eight tambon administrative organizations (TAO).

No.	Name	Thai	Villages	Pop.
1.	Sa Kaeo	สระแก้ว	18	19,432
2.	Ban Kaeng	บ้านแก้ง	15	13,115
3.	Sala Lamduan	ศาลาลำดวน	15	12,736
4.	Khok Pi Khong	โคกปี่ฆ้อง	18	12,496
5.	Tha Yaek	ท่าแยก	14	12,345
6.	Tha Kasem	ท่าเกษม	12	13,412
8.	Sa Khwan	สระขวัญ	20	16,456
11.	Nong Bon	หนองบอน	12	7,100

Missing numbers are tambon now forming Khao Chakan District.
