= Tha Mai district =

Tha Mai ท่าใหม่
- District
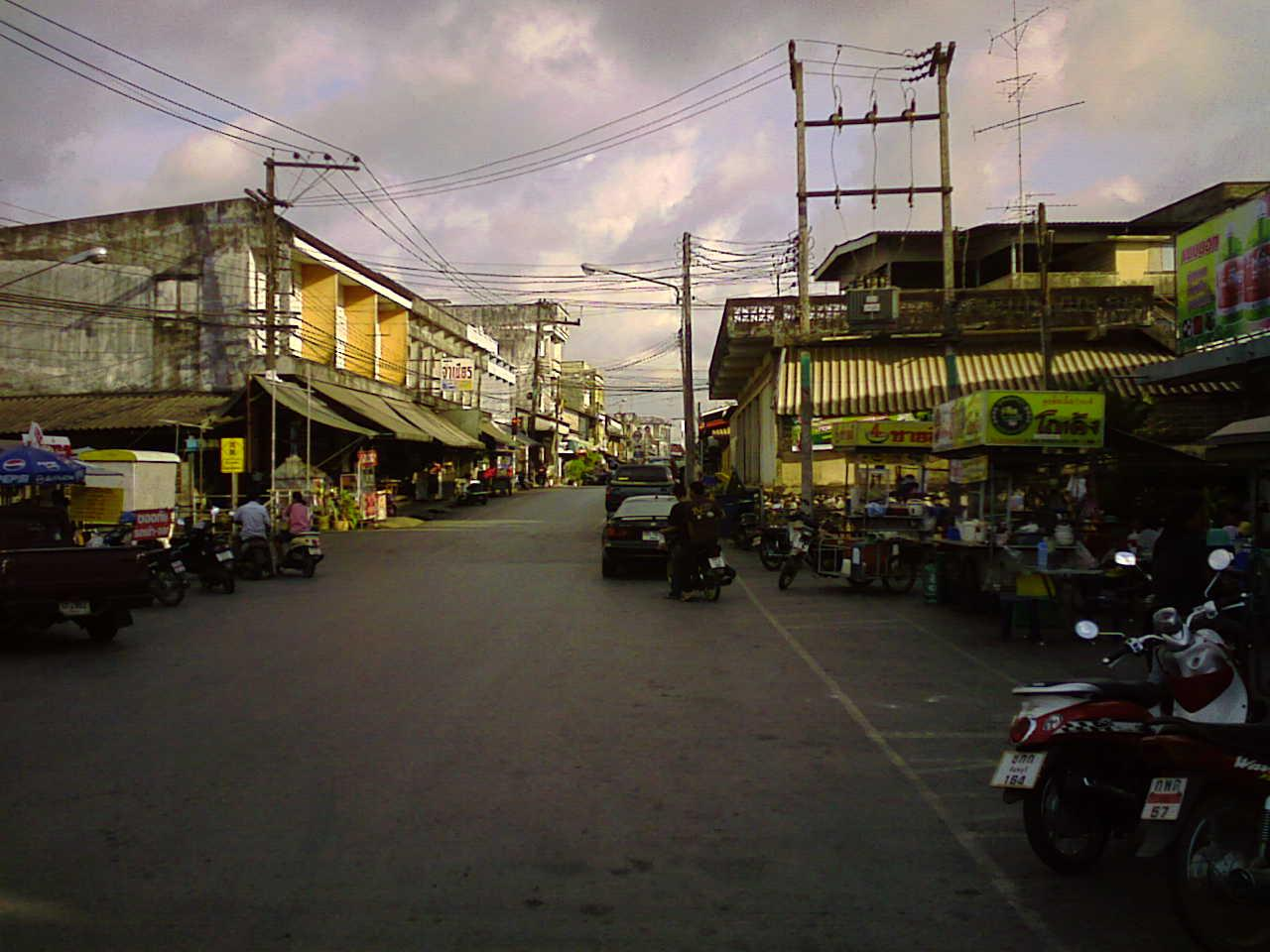
- Tha Mai community and its market

- District location in Chanthaburi province
- Coordinates: 12°37′15″N 102°0′36″E
- Country: Thailand
- Province: Chanthaburi
- Seat: Tha Mai

Area
  - Total: 612.8 km^{2} (236.6 sq mi)

Population (2008)
  - Total: 69,403
  - Density: 112.1/km^{2} (290/sq mi)
- Time zone: UTC+7 (ICT)
- Postal code: 22120
- Geocode: 2203

Tha Mai (Thai: ท่าใหม่, pronounced [tʰâː màj]) is a district (amphoe) of Chanthaburi province, eastern Thailand.

== History ==
The district was created in 1900, then named Khamong (โขมง). Four years later the district office was moved to the area of Wat Khao Phloi Waen, and the district name was changed accordingly to Phloi Waen (พลอยแหวน). When in 1917 the office was moved to Tambon Tha Mai, the district name was changed to be same as the central tambon.

== Geography ==
Neighboring districts are (from the west clockwise) Na Yai Am, Kaeng Hang Maeo, Khao Khitchakut, Mueang Chanthaburi and Laem Sing of Chanthaburi Province. To the southwest is the Gulf of Thailand.

== Administration ==
The district is divided into 14 sub-districts (tambons), which are further subdivided into 124 villages (mubans). There are three sub-district municipalities (thesaban tambons): Tha Mai covers tambons Tha Mai and Yai Ra, Noen Sung covers parts of tambon Khao Wua and Khao Baisi, and Nong Khla covers parts of Thung Bencha. There are a further 12 tambon administrative organizations (TAO).

No.	Name	Thai	Villages	Pop.
1.	Tha Mai	ท่าใหม่	-	7,581
2.	Yai Ra	ยายร้า	-	1,616
3.	Si Phaya	สีพยา	11	1,613
4.	Bo Phu	บ่อพุ	8	1,322
5.	Phloi Waen	พลอยแหวน	7	1,640
6.	Khao Wua	เขาวัว	9	3,576
7.	Khao Baisi	เขาบายศรี	12	7,642
8.	Song Phi Nong	สองพี่น้อง	17	7,400
9.	Thung Bencha	ทุ่งเบญจา	14	11,669
11.	Ramphan	รำพัน	10	3,446
12.	Khamong	โขมง	6	3,168
13.	Takat Ngao	ตะกาดเง้า	10	7,566
14.	Khlong Khut	คลองขุด	10	4,750
24.	Khao Kaeo	เขาแก้ว	10	6,414

Missing numbers belong to tambons which now form districts Kaeng Hang Maeo and Na Yai Am.

== In media ==
Tha Mai is regarded as a small district that is quiet and people have a traditional way of life. It is therefore used as a filming location and as the backdrop for Where We Belong (2019), a drama film of popular girlgroup teen idol BNK48. The film was directed by Kongdej Jaturanrasamee.
