= Sa Kaeo province =

Province of Thailand

Coordinates: 13°47′49″N 102°8′14″E

Sa Kaeo สระแก้ว
- Province
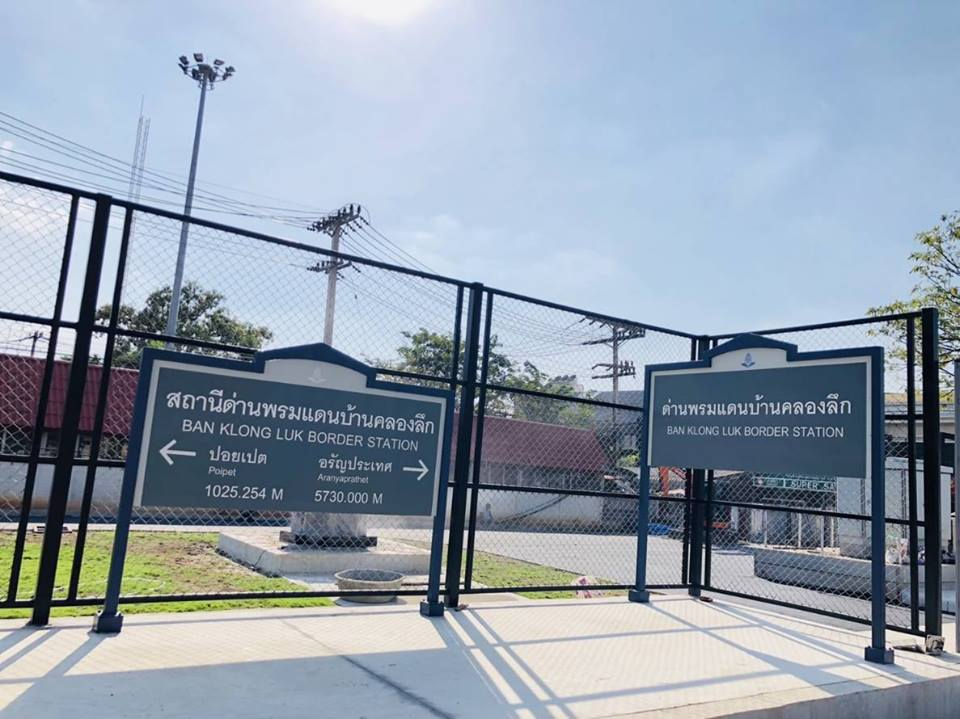
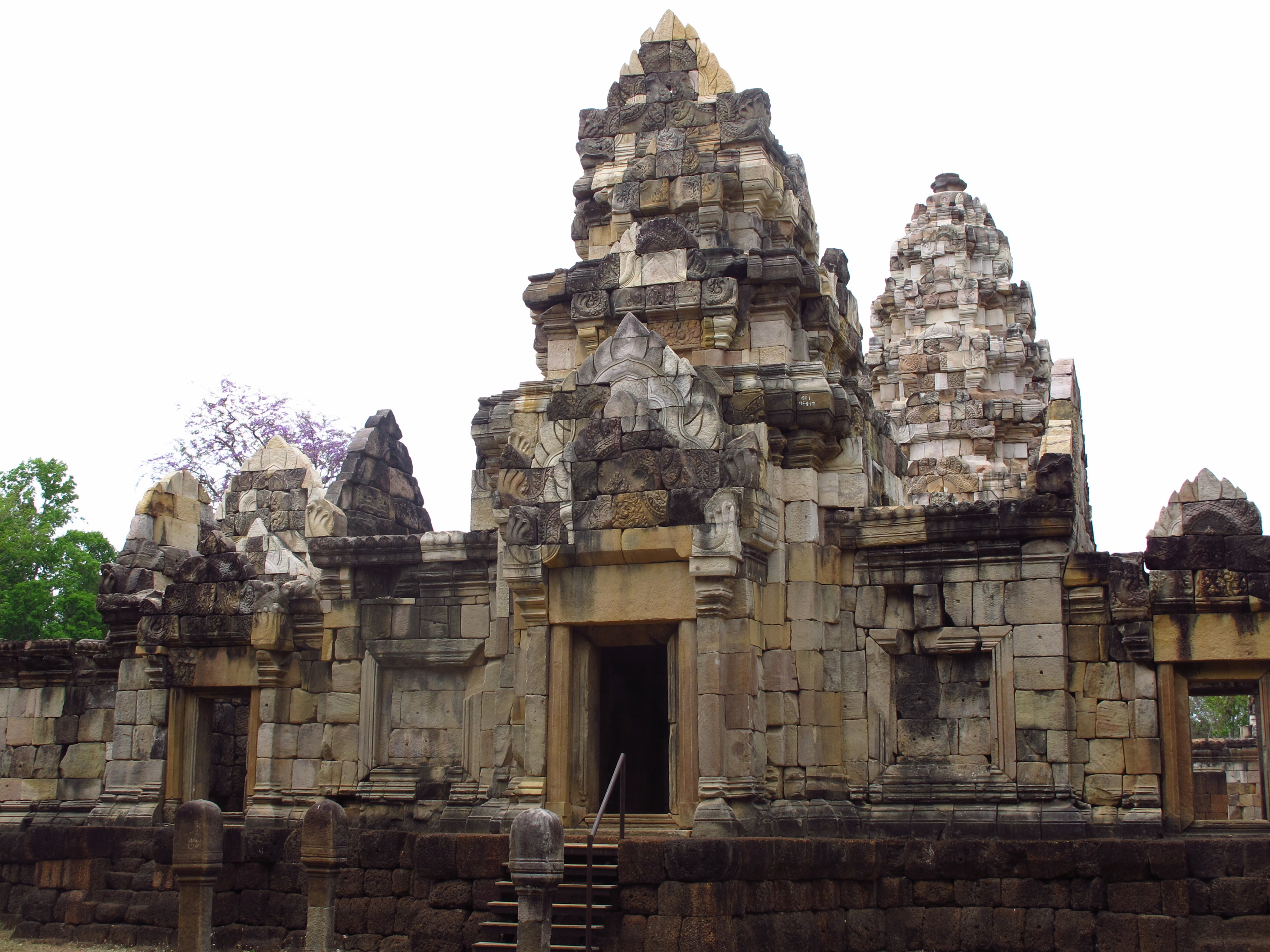
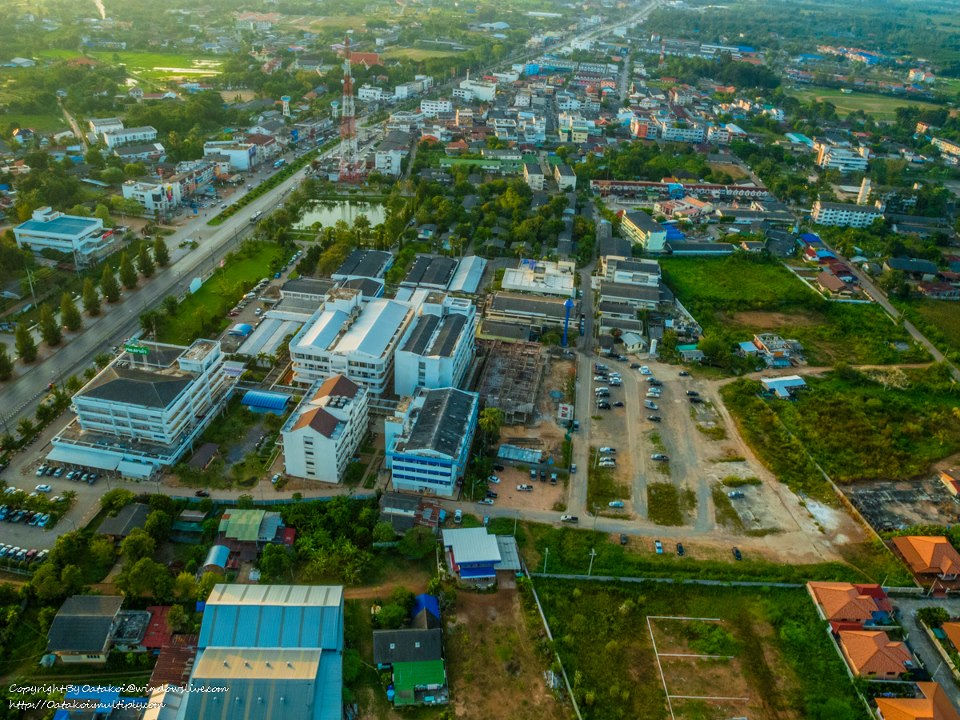
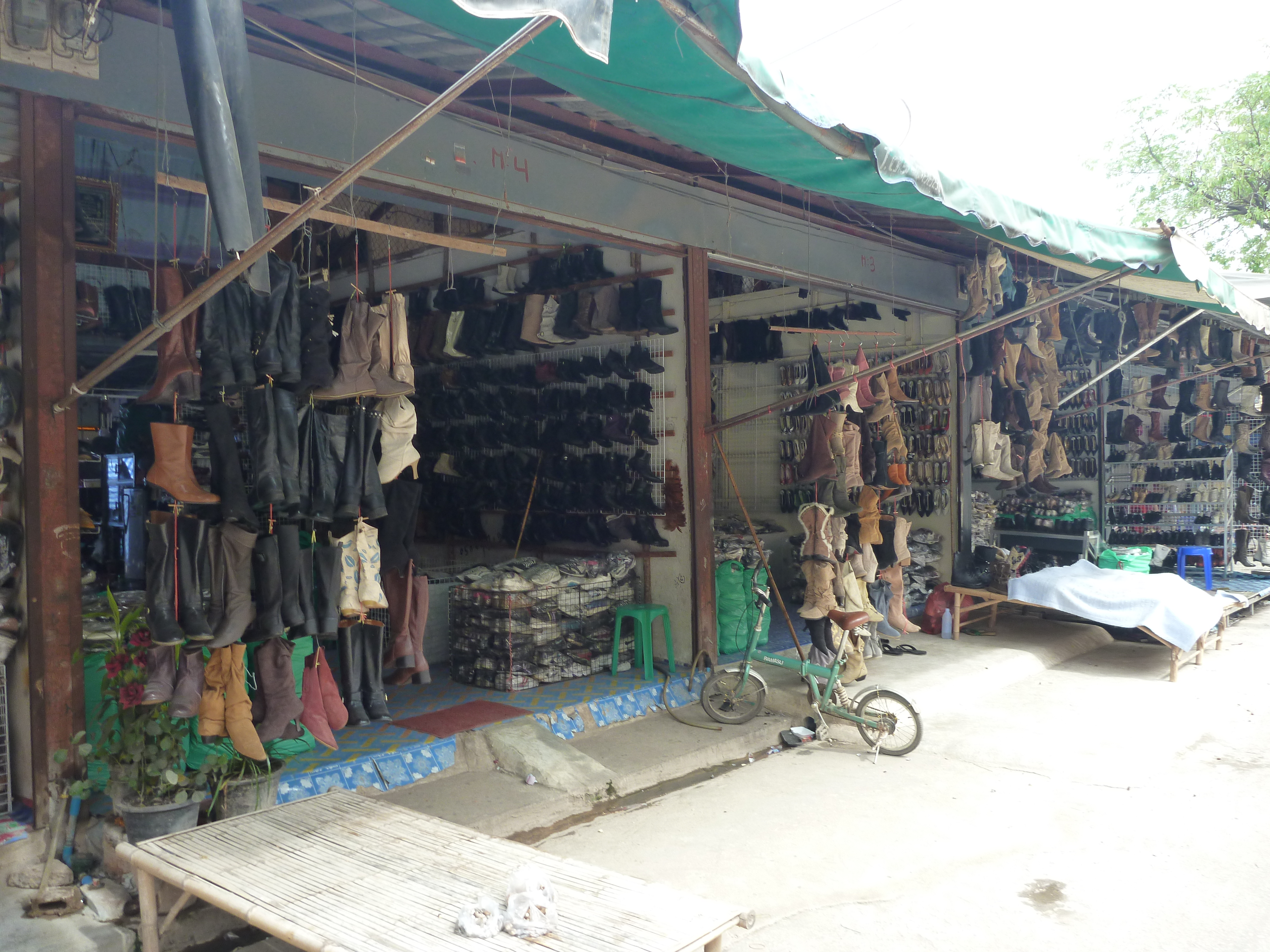
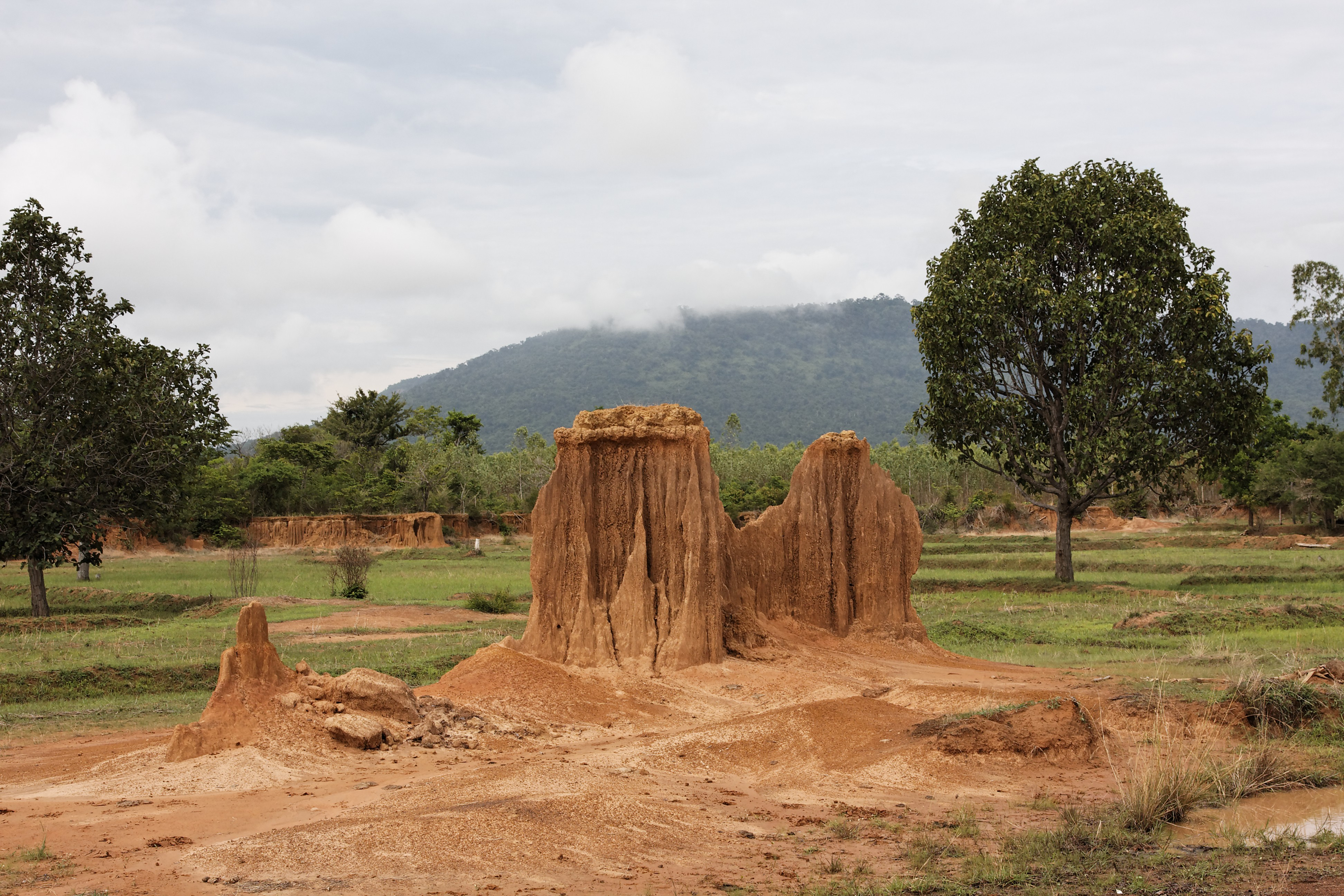
- (Clockwise from top left) Ban Klong Luk Border railway station next to Rong Kluea market, Prasat Sdok Kok Thom, Aerial view of Sakaeo Crown Prince Hospital, Boot shops in Rong Kluea market, Lalu

- Flag Seal
- Motto: ชายแดนเบื้องบูรพา ป่างามน้ำตกสวย มากด้วยรอยอารยธรรมโบราณ ย่านการค้าไทย-เขมร ("The Eastern border. Beautiful forests and waterfalls. Rich in ancient history. The Thai-Khmer commercial area.")
- Map of Thailand highlighting Sa Kaeo province
- Country: Thailand
- Capital: Sa Kaeo

Government
  - Governor: Parinya Phothisat (since 2021)

Area
  - Total: 6,831 km^{2} (2,637 sq mi)
  - Rank: 28th

Population (2024)
  - Total: ▼562,242
  - Rank: 45th
  - Density: 82/km^{2} (210/sq mi)
  - Rank: 61st

Human Achievement Index
  - HAI (2022): 0.6207 "low" Ranked 66th

GDP
  - Total: baht 45 billion (US$1.6 billion) (2019)
- Time zone: UTC+7 (ICT)
- Postal code: 27xxx
- Calling code: 037
- ISO 3166 code: TH-27
- Website: sakaeo.go.th

Sa Kaeo Provincial Administrative Organization องค์การบริหารส่วนจังหวัดสระแก้ว
- Provincial Administrative Organization
- Interactive map of Sa Kaeo Provincial Administrative Organization

Government
  - Type: Local administrative divisions
  - Body: Sa Kaeo Provincial Administrative Organization
  - President: Tarnis Thienthong
- Website: sakaeopao.go.th

Sa Kaeo (Thai: สระแก้ว, pronounced [sàʔ kɛ̂ːw]) is one of the 76 provinces (changwat) and lies in eastern Thailand about 200 km from Bangkok. Neighboring provinces are (from south clockwise) Chanthaburi, Chachoengsao, Prachinburi, Nakhon Ratchasima, and Buriram.

Four Sanskrit and Khmer inscriptions of the sixth and seventh centuries come from the province, among them the Khao Rang inscription of 639 and the stones from Khao Noi and Ban Kut Tae. Sa Kaeo was separated from Prachinburi in 1993, and it borders Cambodia at Aranyaprathet. To the east it borders Banteay Meanchey and Battambang of Cambodia.

== History ==
The Khao Rang inscription (K. 505), dated 561 śaka, that is 639 CE, was found near the Thai-Cambodian border in what is now this province. It commemorates gifts to a Buddhist vihāra. Nicolas Revire cites it among the evidence for Buddhists living in the Chenla sphere in the seventh and eighth centuries. Chaowanee Lekkla lists three further inscriptions from the province among twenty-four referred to Zhēnlà. Chong Sa Chaeng, Pch. 5, stands by brick ruins and a brick pond on a pass over the Banthat range, 400 km north-west of Sambor Prei Kuk. Khao Noi, Pch. 16, is dated 637, and Ban Kut Tae, Pch. 26, is dated 635 to 640 and was probably moved from the Khao Noi hill. A sixth-century lintel stands on the northern shrine of Prasat Khao Noi.

Later inscriptions carry the record into the Angkorian period. K. 957, from Ban Phang Phuay, is dated 941 and issued in the name of Rajendravarman; K. 232, of 1016, is cut on the door frame of Prasat Khao Lon; and K. 235, of 1052, is the Sdok Kok Thom stone, cut in the reign of Udayadityavarman II. Patcharaporn Ngernkerd and colleagues read that group, with K. 233, K. 999 and K. 1152, as evidence that Ta Phraya in the north of the province was administered directly from Angkor. In their survey of fifteen moated sites in eastern Thailand, Mueang Phai in Aranyaprathet district is one of four central towns, measuring 1.28 km² within its moat and rectangular with rounded corners in plan.

Sa Kaeo became a province in 1993, when the six districts Sa Kaeo, Khlong Hat, Wang Nam Yen, Aranyaprathet, Ta Phraya, and Watthana Nakhon of Prachinburi province were elevated to provincial status. It is thus one of the four newest provinces of Thailand, together with Amnat Charoen, Nong Bua Lamphu, and most recently, Bueng Kan.

The province is overwhelmingly Theravada Buddhist (99.4 percent).

In 1979 Sa Kaeo Refugee Camp was established northwest of Sa Kaeo town. It closed in 1989, but the legacy of the border clashes of the 1970s, 1980s, and 1990s is ever present. The largest land mine field in the world was planted along the Thai-Cambodia border according to some experts. Almost 4,000 people have been injured or killed by landmines in Thailand since the border battles, 19 of them in 2017 alone. According to a survey conducted in 2001, 27 of Thailand's 76 provinces were plagued with land mines, impacting more than 530 communities and some 500,000 people. Thailand still has approximately 409 km^{2} of mined area to clear scattered around the country. With an annual clearance rate of about one km^{2} between 2011 and 2015 the problem will not soon disappear.

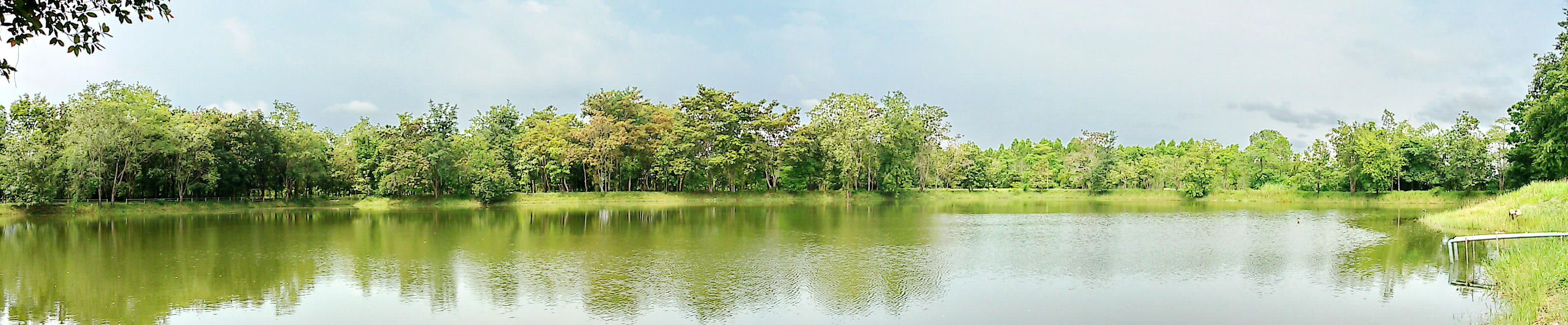
Sa Kaeo Sa Khwan

The name Sa Kaeo, literally 'crystal pond', refers to two ponds (Sa Kaeo Sa Khwan) containing water thought to be sacred once used for the coronation ceremony. The name of the province originated with this place, now the ponds lie inside a public park next to Mueang Sa Kaeo Municipality Office.

== Geography ==
The north of the province is covered with the forested mountains of the Sankamphaeng Range and the Dangrek Mountains. The total forest area in 2021 is 1,506 km^{2} (581 sq mi) or 22 percent of provincial area. To the south are the foothills of the Cardamom Mountains, which are mostly deforested.

=== National parks ===
There are two national parks, along with two other national parks, make up region 1 (Prachinburi) of Thailand's protected areas. (Visitors in fiscal year 2024)

Pang Sida National Park	844 km^{2} (326 sq mi)	(49,915)
Ta Phraya National Park	594 km^{2} (229 sq mi)	(5,662)

== Symbols ==
The provincial seal shows the sun rising over archaeological ruins, Prasat Khao Noi Si Chompu, a significant Khmer temple. The rising sun symbolizes the location of the province in the east. In the front is a Buddha image in a pond with lotus flowers.

The provincial tree is Phyllanthus emblica. The provincial flower is the Orange Jessamine (Murraya paniculata). The provincial aquatic life is Leptobarbus hoevenii.

The provincial slogan is "Frontier of the east, beautiful forests, splendid waterfalls, ancient civilisations, Thai-Cambodian commerce".

== Administrative divisions ==
Map of Sa Kaeo with 9 districts

=== Provincial government ===
Sa Kaeo is divided into nine districts (amphoe). The districts are further divided into 59 subdistricts (tambons) and 619 villages (mubans).

1. Mueang Sa Kaeo
2. Khlong Hat
3. Ta Phraya
4. Wang Nam Yen
5. Watthana Nakhon
6. Aranyaprathet
7. Khao Chakan
8. Khok Sung
9. Wang Sombun

=== Local government ===
As of 26 November 2019 the province had one Provincial Administration Organisation (PAO) (ongkan borihan suan changwat) and 16 municipalities (thesaban): Sa Kaeo, Aranyaprathet, and Wang Nam Yen had town (thesaban mueang) status, with a further 13 subdistrict municipalities (thesaban tambon). (Non-municipal areas are administered by 49 Subdistrict Administrative Organisations (SAO) (ongkan borihan suan tambon).

== Human achievement index 2022 ==
Health	Education	Employment	Income
44	55	62	62
Housing	Family	Transport	Participation
5	49	75	44
Province Sa Kaeo, with an HAI 2022 value of 0.6207 is "low", occupies place 66 in the ranking.

Since 2003, United Nations Development Programme (UNDP) in Thailand has tracked progress on human development at sub-national level using the Human achievement index (HAI), a composite index covering all the eight key areas of human development. National Economic and Social Development Board (NESDB) has taken over this task since 2017.

Rank	Classification
1 - 13	"high"
14 - 29	"somewhat high"
30 - 45	"average"
46 - 61	"somewhat low"
62 - 77	"low"

Map with provinces and HAI 2022 rankings
