= Chonburi provincial and local government =

The Chonburi provincial government is divided into three systems of local government: provincial and local government. Pattaya, as Thailand's largest tourist-oriented city, has a special local government.

== Chonburi provincial government ==
Chonburi province

Chonburi province, with a registered population as of 31 December 2019 of 1,558,301, is led by a governor and is divided into 11 districts (amphoe). Each district is led by a district chief (nai amphoe). Governor, district chiefs, and district clerks are appointed by the central government. There are 92 subdistricts (tambon), each led by a subdistrict chief (kamnan); these are further divided into 711 villages (muban), each led by a village chief (phu yai ban). Subdistrict chiefs and village chiefs are elected by local citizens.

Districts Chonburi province	#	Name	Thai
	1	Mueang Chonburi	เมืองชลบุรี
	2	Ban Bueng	บ้านบึง
	3	Nong Yai	หนองใหญ่
	4	Bang Lamung	บางละมุง
	5	Phan Thong	พานทอง
	6	Phanat Nikhom	พนัสนิคม
	7	Si Racha	ศรีราชา
	8	Ko Si Chang	เกาะสีชัง
	9	Sattahip	สัตหีบ
	10	Bo Thong	บ่อทอง
	11	Ko Chan	เกาะจันทร์

=== Mueang Chonburi district ===
#	Subdistrict	Population	Villages
1	Ban Suan	66,261	10
2	Na Pa	40,899	12
3	Saen Suk	38,776	-
4	Samet	35,813	8
5	Huai Kapi	24,496	7
6	Nong Ri	16,334	14
7	Bang Pla Soi	14,538	-
8	Nong Mai Daeng	12,975	7
9	Don Hua Lo	12,584	7

#	Subdistrict	Population	Villages
10	Bang Sai	12,136	6
11	Ban Puek	9,100	7
12	Khlong Tamru	8,172	6
13	Mueang district	6,970	5
14	Nong Khang Khok	6,469	7
15	Ban Khot	6,050	-
16	Ang Sila	5,873	5
17	Makham Yong	5,725	-
18	Samnak Bok	5,705	6
	Total population	328,876	107

=== Ban Bueng district ===
#	Subdistrict	Population	Villages
1	Ban Bueng	33,782	5
2	Nong Irun	16,264	12
3	Khlong Kao	18,214	9
4	Nong Chak	10,850	4

#	Subdistrict	Population	Villages
5	Nong Phai Kaeo	9,658	5
6	Map Phai	6,405	6
7	Nong Samsak	6,182	5
8	Nong Bon Daeng	5,820	6
	Total population	107,175	52

=== Nong Yai district ===
#	Subdistrict	Population	Villages
1	Nong Yai	8,492	6
2	Nong Suea Chang	4,237	5
3	Khlong Plu	3,973	4

#	Subdistrict	Population	Villages
4	Khao Sok	3,662	4
5	Hang Sung	3,443	5
	Total population	23,807	24

=== Bang Lamung district ===
#	Subdistrict	Population	Villages
1	Nong Prue	153,040	14
2	Na Kluea	49,129	7
3	Huai Yai	30,277	13
4	Bang Lamung	25,690	9

#	Subdistrict	Population	Villages
5	Takhian Tia	23,541	5
6	Nong Pla Lai	22,674	9
7	Pong	10,233	10
8	Khao Mai Kaeo	7,250	5
	Total population	321,834	72

=== Phan Thong district ===
#	Subdistrict	Population	Villages
1	Nong Tamleung	13,076	9
2	Phan Thong	12,711	10
3	Map Pong	9,595	10
4	Bang Nang	7,362	9
5	Nong Hong	7,333	6
6	Nong Kakha	6,520	5

#	Subdistrict	Population	Villages
7	Ban Kao	5,714	7
8	Khok Khi Non	3,203	5
9	Na Pradu	2,742	5
10	Ko Loi	2,573	6
11	Bang Hak	1,153	4
	Total population	69,102	76

=== Phanat Nikhom district ===
#	Subdistrict	Population	Villages
1	Nong Hiang	14,095	16
2	Mon Nang	13,661	12
3	Phanat Nikhom	10,296	-
4	Na Reuk	9,662	15
5	Na Wang Hin	7,596	11
6	Sra Siheliym	7,055	11
7	Kut Ngong	7,001	6
8	Ban Chang	6,441	7
9	Ban Set	5,897	8
10	Nong Prue	5,700	10

#	Subdistrict	Population	Villages
11	Na Phra That	5,431	11
12	Hua Thanon	5,156	9
13	Thung Khwang	4,491	10
14	Nong Khayat	4,209	8
15	Rai Lak Thong	3,597	11
16	Na Matum	3,243	7
17	Tha Kham	3,155	7
18	Wat Bot	2,903	11
19	Khok Pla	2,792	8
20	Wat Luang	2,681	7
	Total population	125,061	185

=== Si Racha district ===
#	Subdistrict	Population	Villages
1	Surasak	68,293	10
2	Nong Kham	47,192	11
3	Bueng	45,724	10
4	Thung Sukhla	41,580	12

#	Subdistrict	Population	Villages
5	Bo Win	40,825	8
6	Bang Phra	31,301	12
7	Si Racha	23,927	-
8	Khao Khan Song	10,491	10
	Total population	309,333	73

=== Ko Si Chang district ===
#	Subdistrict	Population	Villages
1	Tha Thewa Wong	4,538	7

=== Sattahip district ===
#	Subdistrict	Population	Villages
1	Sattahip	75,195	9
2	Plu Ta Luang	41,226	8
3	Bang Saray	25,054	11

#	Subdistrict	Population	Villages
4	Na Chom Thian	17,348	9
5	Samae San	6,456	4
	Total population	165,091	41

=== Bo Thong district ===
#	Subdistrict	Population	Villages
1	Bo Thong	14,121	9
2	Phluang Thong	8,043	7
3	That Thong	7,761	9

#	Subdistrict	Population	Villages
4	Kaset Suwan	6,987	7
5	Bo Kwang Thong	6,970	8
6	Wat Suwan	6,322	7
	Total population	50,204	47

=== Ko Chan district ===
#	Subdistrict	Population	Villages
1	Tha Bun Mi	18,893	12
2	Ko Chan	18,853	15
	Total population	37,746	27

== Pattaya City special local government ==
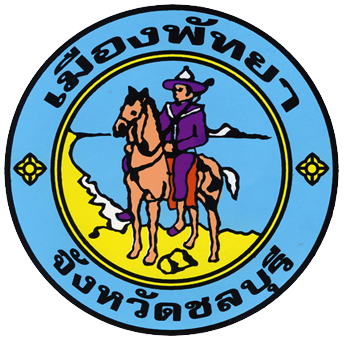
Pattaya City

Pattaya City Administrative Organisation is a special local government since 30 October 1978. The executive branch is led by the Mayor of Pattaya (Nayok Mueang Pattaya) and the legislative branch is led by the Council of Pattaya (Sapha Mueang Pattaya). The Mayor of Pattaya and the Councillors of Pattaya are directly elected by the citizens of Pattaya. There is no subdivision of Pattaya City Administrative Organisation. But there are 42 communities, although not directly chosen, which have an advisory role.

=== Pattaya city ===
Pattaya city municipality	Population	Villages
Subdistrict Nong Prue	67,846	7
Subdistrict Na Kluea	49,129	7
Subdistrict Nong Pla Lai	2,403	3
Subdistrict Huai Yai	154	1
Total population	119,532	

Municipality	Communities	Groups
Pattaya city.	42	-

== Chonburi local government ==
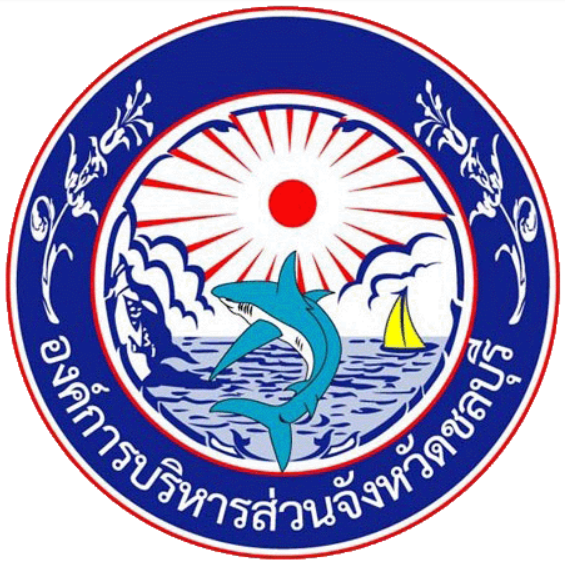
Chonburi PAO

There is one Chonburi Provincial Administrative Organisation - CPAO (ongkan borihan suan changwat chonburi, อบจ.ชลบุรี). There are 49 municipalities, which are divided into 2 city municipalities (thesaban nakhon), 10 town municipalities (thesaban mueang) and 37 subdistrict municipalities (thesaban tambon). Further for the local communities, which are not connected to a thesaban, there are 46 subdistrict administrative organisations - SAO (ongkan borihan suan tambon). All mayors, chiefs and councillors are directly elected by the local citizens. Municipalities have communities (chumchon), although not directly chosen by the local citizens, which provide advice and recommendations to local administrative organisations. They also promote and support community participation and enterprises at the district level and subdistrict villages.

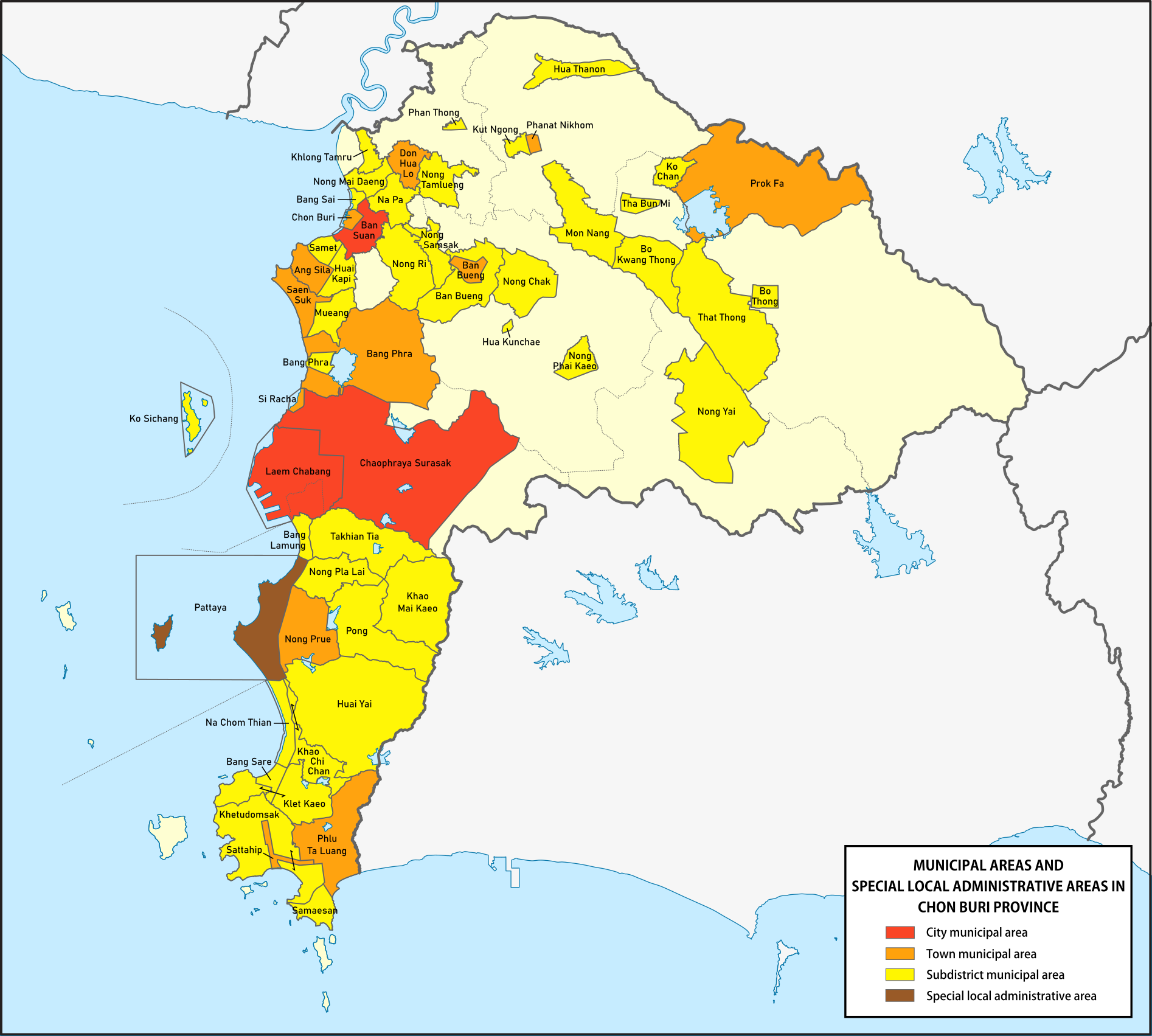

=== Mueang Chonburi district ===
Ban Suan town municipality	Population
Subdistrict Ban Suan	66,261
Subdistrict Nong Khang Khok	1,808
Subdistrict Nong Ri	1,229
Total population	69,298

Saen Suk town municipality	Population
Subdistrict Saen Suk	38,776
Subdistrict Huai Kapi	912
Total population	39,688

Ang Sila town municipality	Population
Subdistrict Samet	13,535
Subdistrict Ban Puek	9,100
Subdistrict Huai Kapi	7,547
Subdistrict Ang Sila	5,873
Total population	36,055

Mueang district town municipality	Population
Subdistrict Ban Pla Soi	14,538
Subdistrict Ban Khot	6,050
Subdistrict Makham Yong	5,725
Total population	26,313

Subdistrict municipalities	Population
Na Pa subdistrict municipality	40,899
Samet subdistrict municipality	22,278
Huai Kapi subdistrict municipality	16,037
Nong Mai Daeng subdistrict mun.	12,975

Subdistrict municipalities	Population
Bang Sai subdistrict municipality	12,136
Don Hua Lo subdistrict mun.	12,584
Mueang subdistrict municipality	6,970
Khlong Tamru subdistrict mun.	4,236

Subdistrict Adm.Org. - SAO	Population
Nong Ri SAO	15,105
Nong Khang Khok SAO	6,289
Samnak Bok SAO	5,705
Khlong Tamru SAO	3,936

Municipality	Communities	Groups
Saen Suk.	15	-
Ang Sila.	20	4
Mueang district.	18	4
Na Pa.	16	-
Bang Sai.	16	-
Don Hua Lo.	7	-

=== Ban Bueng district ===
Ban Bueng town municipality	21,088

Municipality	Communities	Groups
Ban Bueng.	59	-
Nong Chak.	12	-

Subdistrict municipalities	Population
Ban Bueng	12,694
Nong Chak	10,850
Nong Samsak	6,182
Hua Kunchae	2,744
Nong Phai Kaeo	2,343

Subdistrict Adm. Org. - SAO	Population
Nong Irun SAO	16,264
Khlong Kao SAO	15,470
Nong Phai Kaeo SAO	7,315
Map Phai SAO	6,405
Nong Bon Daeng SAO	5,820

=== Nong Yai district ===
Nong Yai subdistrict municipality	8,492
Subdistrict Adm. Org. - SAO	Population
Nong Suea Chang SAO	4,237

Subdistrict Adm. Org. - SAO	Population
Khlong Plu SAO	3,973
Khao Sok SAO	3,662
Hang Sung SAO	3,443

=== Bang Lamung district ===
Laem Chabang city municipality	14,464
Not in Bang Lamung district	73,807

Nong Prue town municipality	85,194

Subdistrict municipalities	Population
Huai Yai subdistrict municipality	30,123
Nong Pla Lai subdistrict mun.	20,271
Takhian Tia subdistrict mun.	23,410
Bang Lamung subdistrict mun.	12,111
Pong subdistrict municipality	10,233

Subdistrict Adm. Org. - SAO	Population
Khao Mai Kaeo SAO	7,250
Municipality	Communities
Laem Chabang.	23
Nong Prue.	44

=== Phan Thong district ===
Nong Tamleung subdistrict mun.	Population
Subdistrict Nong Tamleung	13,076
Subdistrict Nong Kakha	4,379
Subdistrict Map Thong	2,880
Total population	20,335

Phan Thong subdistrict mun.	6,228
Na Pradu subdistrict mun.	2,742
Municipality	Communities
Nong Tamlueng.	11
Na Pradu.	7

Subdistrict Adm. Org. - SAO	Population
Phan Thong + Nong Kakha SAO	8,624
Bang Nang SAO	7,362
Nong Hong SAO	7,333
Map Pong SAO	6,715

Subdistrict Adm. Org. - SAO	Population
Ban Kao SAO	5,714
Ko Loi + Bang Hak SAO	3,726
Khok Khi Non SAO	3,203

=== Phanat Nikhom district ===
Phanat Nikhom town mun.	10,296
Mon Nang subdistrict municipality	13,660
Kut Ngong subdistrict municipality	7,001
Hua Thanon subdistrict municipality	5,156

Municipality	Communities
Phanat Nikhom.	12
Mon Nang.	16

Subdistrict Adm. Org. - SAO	Population
Nong Hiang SAO	14,095
Na Reuk SAO	9,662
Na Wang Hin SAO	7,596
Sra Siheliym SAO	7,055
Ban Chang SAO	6,441
Ban Set SAO	5,897
Nong Prue SAO	5,700
Na Phra That SAO	5,431

Subdistrict Adm. Org. - SAO	Population
Thung Khwang SAO	4,491
Nong Khayat SAO	4,209
Rai Lak Thong SAO	3,597
Na Matum SAO	3,243
Tha Kham SAO	3,155
Wat Bot SAO	2,903
Khok Pla SAO	2,792
Wat Luang SAO	2,681

=== Si Racha district ===
Chao Phraya Surasak city mun.	Population
Subdistrict Surasak	63,279
Subdistrict Bueng	30,227
Subdistrict Nong Kham	30,120
Subdistrict Bo Win	15,830
Subdistrict Khao Khan Song	3,568
Total population	143,024

Laem Chabang city municipality	Population
Subdistrict Thung Sukhla	41,580
Subdistrict Bueng	15,497
Subdistrict Nong Kham	11,716
Subdistrict Surasak	5,014
Total population	73,807
Not in Si Racha district	14,464

Si Racha town municipality	23,927

Bang Phra subdistrict municipality	13,437

Subdistrict Adm. Org. - SAO	Population
Bo Win SAO	24,995
Bang Phra SAO	17,864
Khao Khan Song SAO	6,923
Nong Kham SAO	5,356

Municipality	Communities	Groups
Laem Chabang	23	-
Si Racha	12	-

=== Ko Si Chang district ===
Ko Si Chang subdistrict municipality	4,538

Municipality	Communities	Groups
Ko Si Chang.	7	-

=== Sattahip district ===
Sattahip town municipality	Population
Subdistrict Sattahip	19,145
Subdistrict Plu Ta Luang	3,627
Total population	22,772

Khet Udom Sak subdistrict mun.	Population
Subdistrict Sattahip	56,050
Klet Kaeo subdistrict mun.	Population
Subdistrict Bang Saray	13,539

Subdistrict municipalities	Population
Bang Saray subdistrict mun.	11,515
Na Chom Thian subdistrict mun.	8,167

Kao Chi Chan subdistrict mun.	Population
Subdistrict Na Chom Thian	9,181

Subdistrict Adm. Org. - SAO	Population
Plu Ta Luang SAO	37,599
Samae San SAO	6,268

Municipality	Communities
Bang Saray.	8
Klet Kaeo.	8

=== Bo Thong district ===
Subdistrict municipalities	Population
That Thong subdistrict mun.	7,761
Bo Kwang Thong subdistrict mun.	6,970
Bo Thong subdistrict mun.	4,295

Subdistrict Adm. Org. - SAO	Population
Bo Thong SAO	10,003
Phluang Thong SAO	8,043
Kaset Suwan SAO	6,987
Wat Suwan SAO	6,145

=== Ko Chan district ===
Prok Fa town municipality	14,121

Tha Bun Mi Subdistrict Adm. Org.	12,111

Subdistrict municipalities	Population
Tha Bun Mi subdistrict mun.	6,782
Ko Chan subdistrict mun.	4,732

Municipality	Communities
Prok Fa.	14

== Notes ==
The majority of the information for this wiki-article is based on "Population year 2019" from Bureau of the Registration Administration (BORA). Reference date is December 2019.
