= Don Si Non railway station =

Railway station in Thailand

Don Si Non ดอนสีนนท์
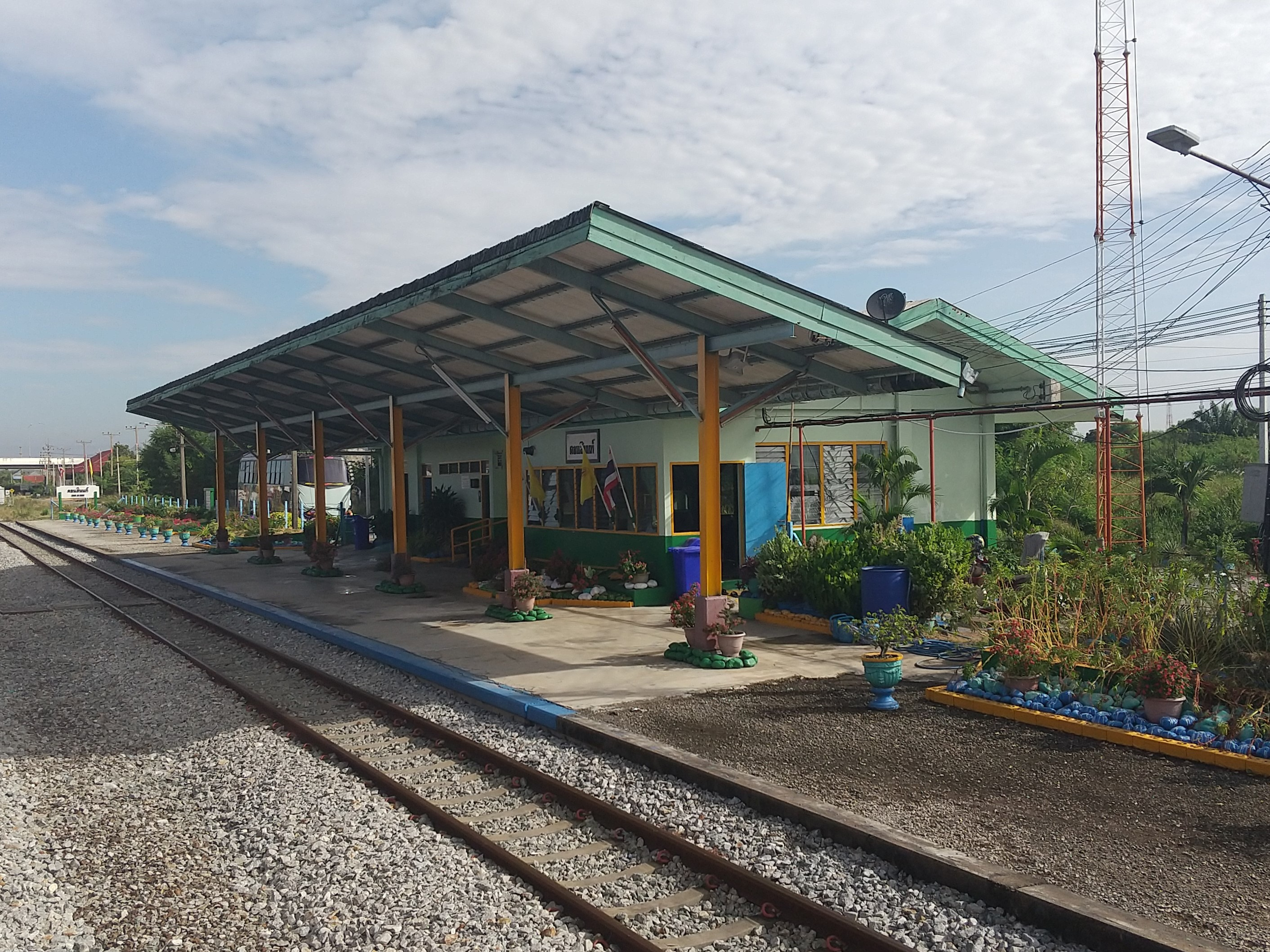

General information
- Location: Nong Tin Nok Subdistrict, Ban Pho District; Chachoengsao Province; Thailand
- Coordinates: 13.6010°N 101.1091°E
- Operator: State Railway of Thailand
- Manager: Ministry of Transport
- Line: Chuk Samet Main Line
- Platforms: 3
- Tracks: 3

Construction
- Structure type: At-grade

Other information
- Station code: ดอ.
- Classification: Class 3

History
- Opened: July 1989

Services
Preceding station	State Railway of Thailand	Following station
Paet Riu Halt towards Hua Lamphong	Eastern Line	Phan Thong towards Chuk Samet
Location

Don Si Non station (Thai: สถานีดอนสีนนท์) is a railway station located in Nong Tin Nok Subdistrict, Ban Pho District, Chachoengsao Province. It is a class 3 railway station located 75.97 km (47.2 mi) from Bangkok railway station.
