= Khlong Tha Lat =

Khlong (canal) in Chachoengsao Province, eastern Thailand

Coordinates: 13.740233°N 101.210741°E

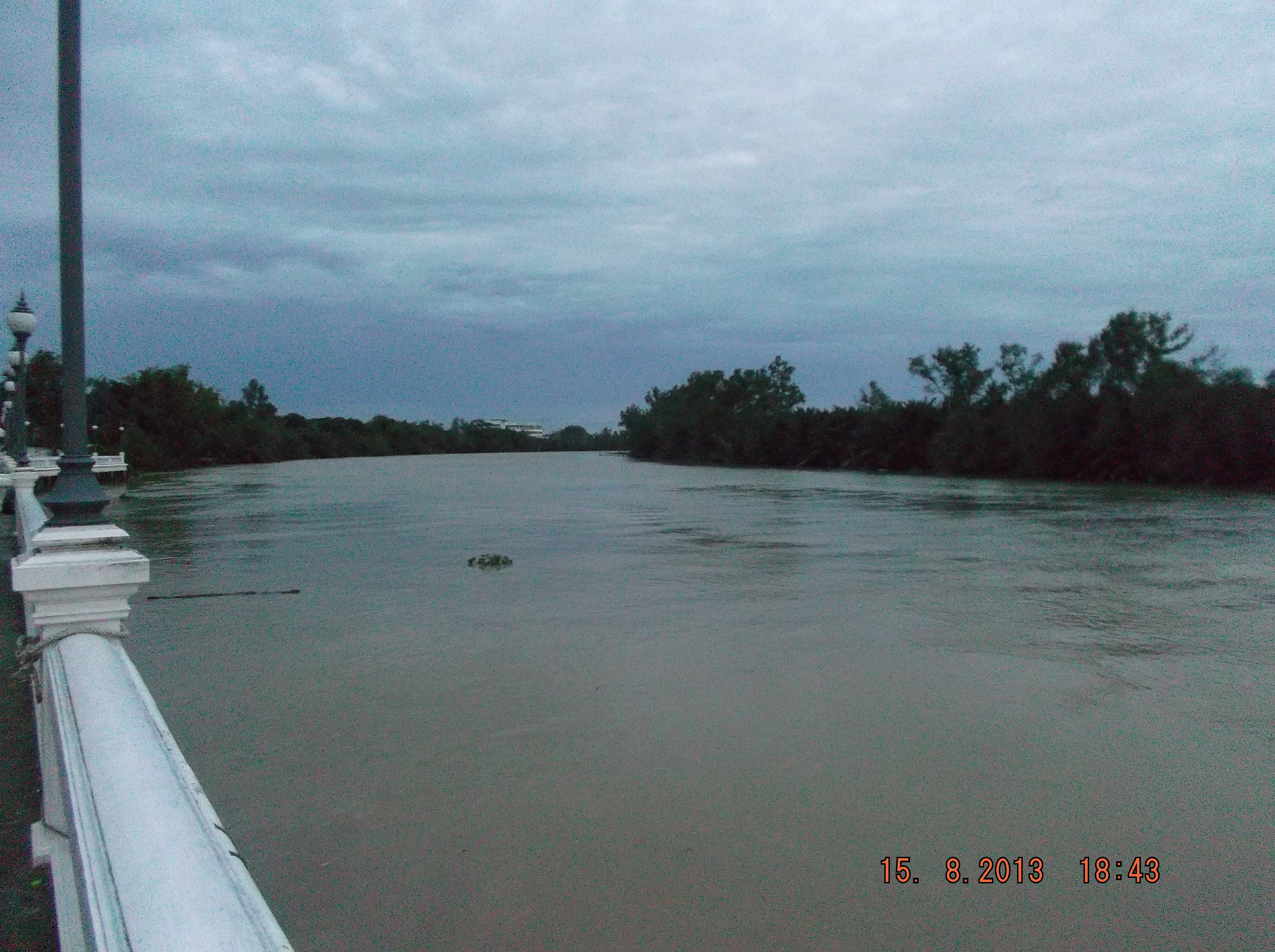
At the terminus of Khlong Tha Lat, in the area called Pak Nam Jolo

Khlong Tha Lat (Thai: คลองท่าลาด, pronounced [kʰlɔ̄ːŋ tʰâː lâːt]) is a natural khlong (canal) in Chachoengsao Province, eastern Thailand.

It originated from Khlong Si Yat and Khlong Rabom in the Chanthaburi Mountains in the area of Sanam Chai Khet District. Then it flows through Phanom Sarakham and Ratchasan Districts up till ends at the confluence the Bang Pakong River at Pak Nam Subdistrict, Bang Khla District, where it is referred to as the "Pak Nam Jolo" (ปากน้ำโจ้โล้, pronounced [pàːk náːm t͡ɕôː lóː]) or "Pak Nam Jaolo" (ปากน้ำเจ้าโล่, pronounced [pàːk náːm t͡ɕâːw lóː]) as spelled in the past.

The area where it merges the Bang Pakong River is the oldest community in Chachoengsao. It dates back to the Ayutthaya Kingdom, and may even predate it. During the second fall of Ayutthaya in 1767, the area was occupied by the Burmese army. Later, in the reign of King Rama I during the early Rattanakosin period, it became the capital district of Chachoengsao Province.

At present, a cetiya (pagoda) at Pak Nam Jolo commemorates King Taksin, the warrior king who repelled the Burmese army and established Thonburi as the new capital after the fall of Ayutthaya. Local belief holds that he once led Ayutthaya's troops to fight the Burmese in this area after escaping from the old capital. However, according to reliable historical evidence from the Fine Arts Department, this event did not actually take place here.
