= Plaeng Yao district =

Plaeng Yao แปลงยาว
- District
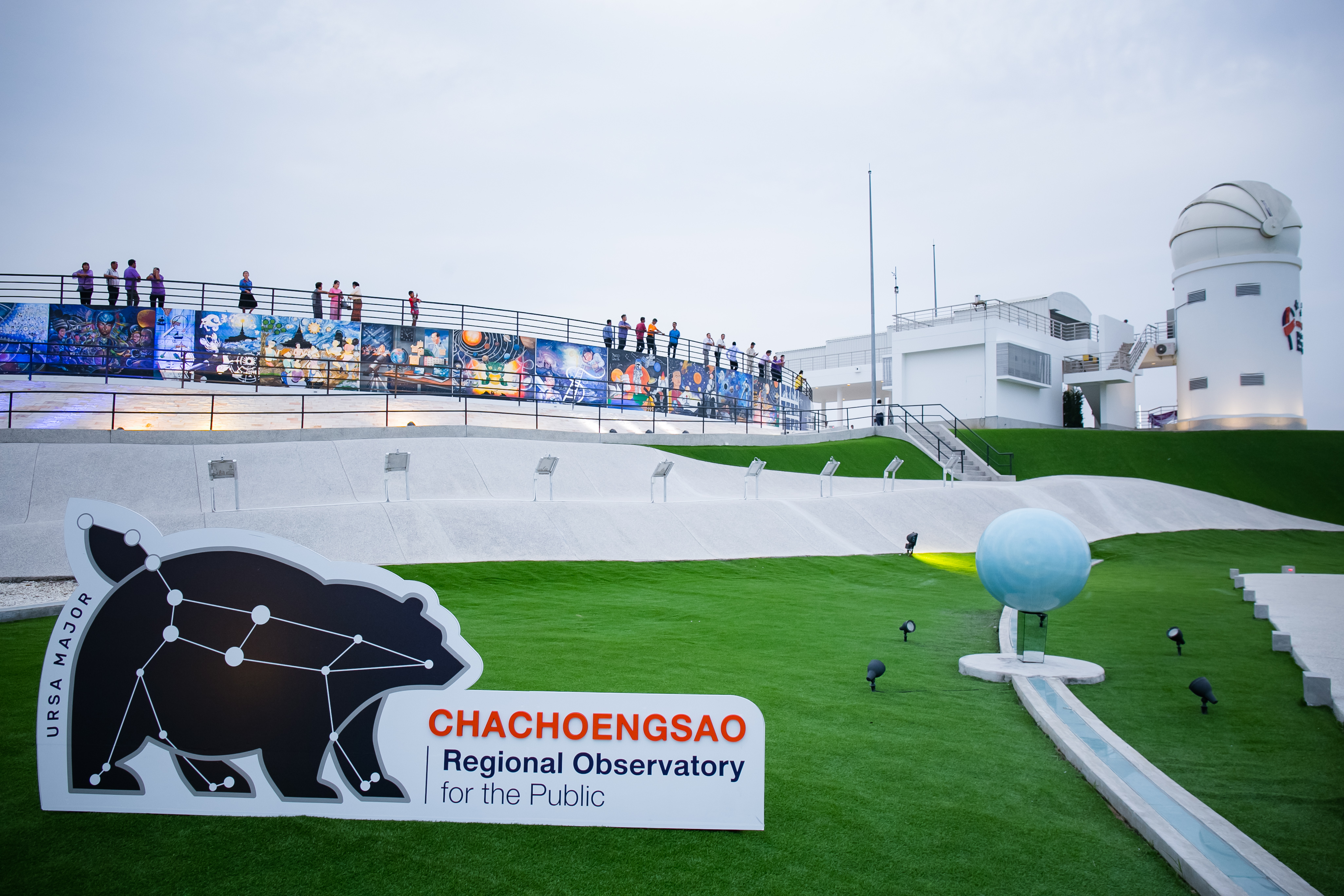
- Regional observatory for the public Chachoengsao

- District location in Chachoengsao province
- Coordinates: 13°35′5″N 101°17′3″E
- Country: Thailand
- Province: Chachoengsao
- Seat: Wang Yen

Area
  - Total: 237.23 km^{2} (91.60 sq mi)

Population (2017)
  - Total: 44,706
  - Density: 188.45/km^{2} (488.1/sq mi)
- Time zone: UTC+7 (ICT)
- Postal code: 24190
- Geocode: 2409

Plaeng Yao (Thai: แปลงยาว, pronounced [plɛ̄ːŋ jāːw]) is a district (amphoe) of Chachoengsao province, central Thailand.

== History ==
The minor district (king amphoe) Plaeng Yao was established on 16 October 1978 with the three tambons: Plaeng Yao, Hua Samrong, and Wang Yen from Bang Khla district. It was upgraded to a full district on 15 March 1985.

== Geography ==
Neighboring districts are (from the west clockwise): Ban Pho, Bang Khla, Ratchasan, Phanom Sarakham, and Sanam Chai Khet of Chachoengsao Province; and Ko Chan, Phanat Nikhom, and Phan Thong of Chonburi province.

== Economy ==
Plaeng Yao is home to Toyota's Gateway Assembly Plant. It has been used to manufacture the Prius model.

== Administration ==
=== Central administration ===
Plaeng Yao district is divided into four sub-districts (tambons), which are further subdivided into 48 administrative villages (mubans).

No.	Name	Thai	Villages	Pop.
1.	Plaeng Yao	แปลงยาว	13	10,724
2.	Wang Yen	วังเย็น	11	13,716
3.	Hua Samrong	หัวสำโรง	12	11,514
4.	Nong Mai Kaen	หนองไม้แก่น	12	7,470

=== Local administration ===
There are four sub-district municipalities (thesaban tambons) in the district:

- Thung Sadao (Thai: เทศบาลตำบลทุ่งสะเดา) consisting of parts of sub-districts Plaeng Yao and Wang Yen.
- Plaeng Yao (Thai: เทศบาลตำบลแปลงยาว) consisting of parts of sub-districts Plaeng Yao and Wang Yen.
- Hua Samrong (Thai: เทศบาลตำบลหัวสำโรง) consisting of parts of sub-district Hua Samrong.
- Wang Yen (Thai: เทศบาลตำบลวังเย็น) consisting of parts of sub-district Wang Yen.

There are three sub-district administrative organizations (SAO) in the district:

- Plaeng Yao (Thai: องค์การบริหารส่วนตำบลแปลงยาว) consisting of parts of sub-district Plaeng Yao.
- Hua Samrong (Thai: องค์การบริหารส่วนตำบลหัวสำโรง) consisting of parts of sub-district Hua Samrong.
- Nong Mai Kaen (Thai: องค์การบริหารส่วนตำบลหนองไม้แก่น) consisting of sub-district Nong Mai Kaen.
