= Phanat Nikhom district =

Phanat Nikhom พนัสนิคม
- District
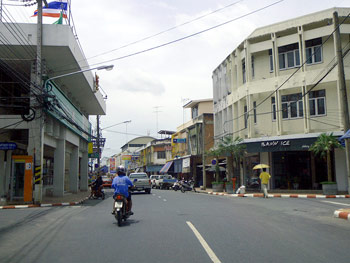
- Typical atmosphere of Phanat Nikhom

- District location in Chonburi province
- Coordinates: 13°27′8″N 101°10′38″E
- Country: Thailand
- Province: Chonburi
- Seat: Phanat Nikhom
- Tambon: 20

Area
  - Total: 450.9 km^{2} (174.1 sq mi)

Population (2015)
  - Total: 123,213
  - Density: 273.26/km^{2} (707.7/sq mi)
- Time zone: UTC+7 (ICT)
- Postal code: 20140
- Geocode: 2006

Phanat Nikhom (Thai: พนัสนิคม, pronounced [pʰā.nát ní(ʔ).kʰōm]) is a district (amphoe) in the northern part of Chonburi province, eastern Thailand.

== History ==
Phanat Nikhom is an ancient city dating back to Dvaravati period, called Mueang Phra Rot. Archaeologists found a fortress and city walls within the district area. Patcharaporn Ngernkerd and colleagues make Mueang Phra Rot one of four central towns in a survey of fifteen moated sites of eastern Thailand, measuring 1.19 km² within its moat and rectangular with rounded corners in plan. They place it on a former shoreline of the Gulf of Thailand, occupied since at least the sixth century, and record a late Dvaravati stupa outside the moats and a vanaspati. On their reading the town seems to have been under the rule of Si Mahosot in Prachin Buri, a larger moated town of the same group. In the Rattanakosin era, King Nangklao, Rama III established city, called Mueang Phanat Nikhom in 1828. It was changed to be a district of Mueang Chon Buri by King Chulalongkorn, Rama V in 1904. Phanat Nikhom was divided into new five districts: Phan Thong, Nong Yai, Bo Thong, Ko Chan and Nong Irun, Nong Chak, Nong Bon Daeng sub-district in Ban Bueng.

In Mon Nang sub-district, there is a shrine to the Twelve Sisters with the rock they used as pillow when they wandered in the wilderness, as well as a Carissa carandas tree related to the legend.

== Geography ==
Neighboring districts are (from east clockwise), Ko Chan, Bo Thong, Ban Bueng, Phan Thong of Chonburi Province, Ban Pho and Plaeng Yao of Chachoengsao province).

== Administration ==
The district is divided into 20 sub-districts (tambons), which are further subdivided into 185 villages (mubans). The town (thesaban mueang) Phanat Nikhom covers the whole tambon Phanat Nikhom. Each of the other 19 tambons is led by a tambon administrative organization (TAO).

No.	Name	Thai	Pop.
1.	Phanat Nikhom	พนัสนิคม	11,912
2.	Na Phrathat	หน้าพระธาตุ	4,840
3.	Wat Luang	วัดหลวง	2,781
4.	Ban Soet	บ้านเซิด	3,369
5.	Na Roek	นาเริก	8,821
6.	Mon Nang	หมอนนาง	13,614
7.	Sa Si Liam	สระสี่เหลี่ยม	6,772
8.	Wat Bot	วัดโบสถ์	3,054
9.	Kut Ngong	กุฎโง้ง	5,283
10.	Hua Thanon	หัวถนน	4,890
11.	Tha Kham	ท่าข้าม	2,882
13.	Nong Prue	หนองปรือ	5,232
14.	Nong Khayat	หนองขยาด	4,028
15.	Thung Khwang	ทุ่งขวาง	4,158
16.	Nong Hiang	หนองเหียง	12,924
17.	Na Wang Hin	นาวังหิน	7,047
18.	Ban Chang	บ้านช้าง	5,936
20.	Khok Phlo	โคกเพลาะ	2,746
21.	Rai Lak Thong	ไร่หลักทอง	3,386
22.	Na Matum	นามะตูม	2,764

Missing numbers are tambon which now form Ko Chan District.
