= Phan Thong railway station =

Railway station in Chonburi, Thailand

Phan Thong พานทอง
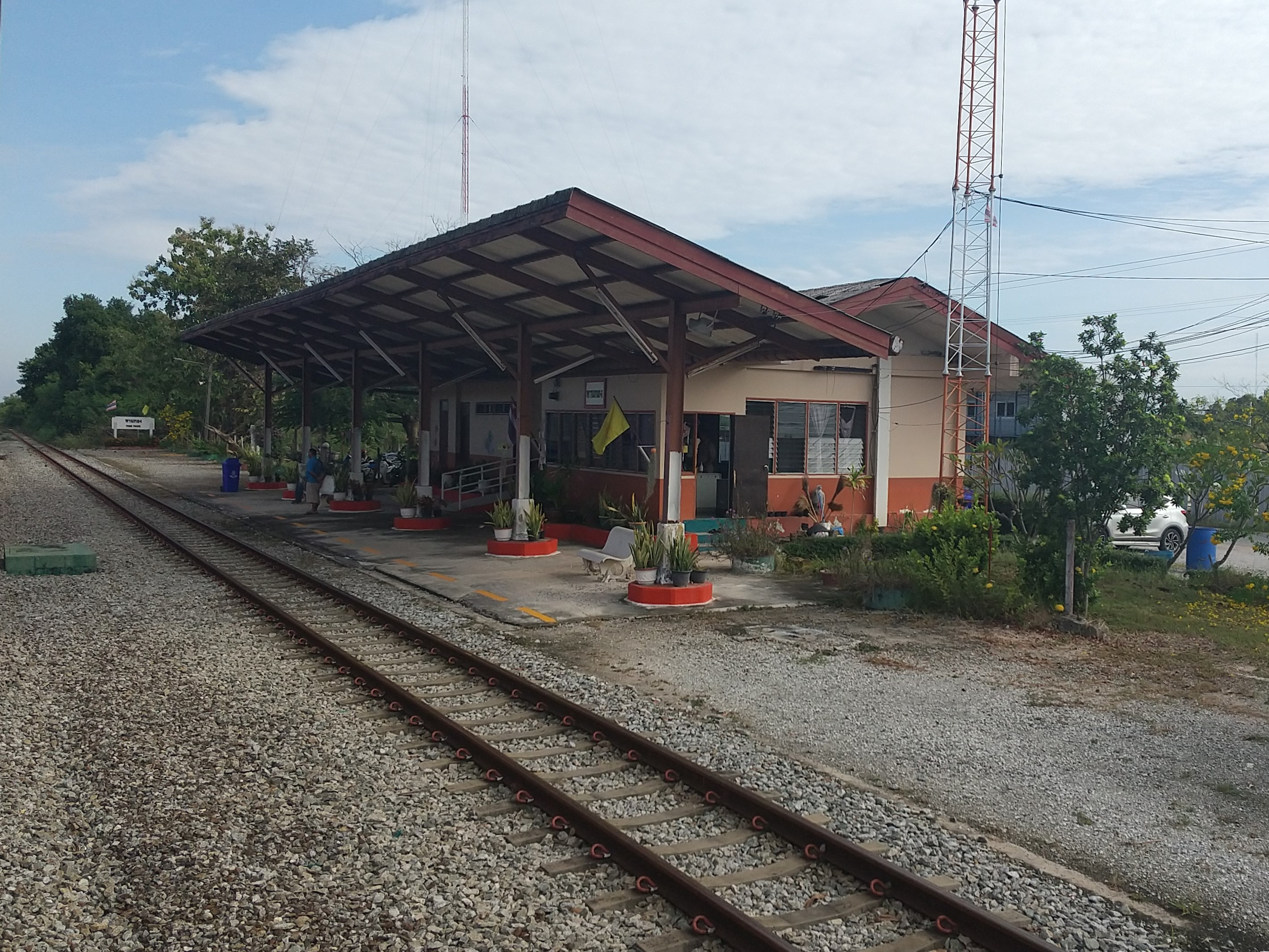

General information
- Location: Phan Thong Subdistrict, Phan Thong District; Chonburi Province; Thailand
- Coordinates: 13.4630°N 101.0813°E
- Operator: State Railway of Thailand
- Manager: Ministry of Transport
- Line: Chuk Samet Main Line
- Platforms: 3
- Tracks: 3

Construction
- Structure type: At-grade

Other information
- Station code: งท.
- Classification: Class 3

History
- Opened: July 1989

Services
Preceding station	State Railway of Thailand	Following station
Don Si Non towards Hua Lamphong	Eastern Line	Chonburi towards Chuk Samet
Location

Phan Thong railway station is a railway station located in Phan Thong Subdistrict, Phan Thong District, Chonburi Province. It is a class 3 railway station located 91.53 km (56.9 mi) from Bangkok railway station.
