= Ban Bueng =

Ban Bueng บ้านบึง
- Town Municipality
- Location in Thailand
- Coordinates: 13°18′51″N 101°6′41″E
- Country: Thailand
- Province: Chonburi
- District: Ban Bueng

Population (2014)
  - Total: 19,346
- Time zone: UTC+7 (ICT)
- Postcode: 20170
- Area code: (+66) 38

Ban Bueng (Thai: บ้านบึง) is a town (thesaban mueang) in the Ban Bueng district (amphoe) of Chonburi province in eastern Thailand. In 2014, it had a population of 19,346.
