= Phanom Sarakham district =

Phanom Sarakham พนมสารคาม
- District
- District location in Chachoengsao province
- Coordinates: 13°44′41″N 101°20′50″E
- Country: Thailand
- Province: Chachoengsao
- Seat: Phanom Sarakham

Area
  - Total: 550.0 km^{2} (212.4 sq mi)

Population (2017)
  - Total: 82,380
  - Density: 149.78/km^{2} (387.9/sq mi)
- Time zone: UTC+7 (ICT)
- Postal code: 24120
- Geocode: 2406

Phanom Sarakham (Thai: พนมสารคาม, pronounced [pʰā.nōm sǎː.rā.kʰāːm]) is a district (amphoe) in the central part of Chachoengsao province, central Thailand.

== History & toponymy ==
Mueang Phanom Sarakham was a city of Ayutthaya Kingdom, contemporaneous with Mueang Phanat Nikhom and Sanam Chai Khet. It became Phanom Sarakham District in 1894. In 1937 the district office was moved from Ban Mueang Mai, Phanom Sarakham Subdistrict to Ban Nong Ri, Mueang Kao Subdistrict.

The original name of the district should be spelled as "Phanom Salakham" (พนมสาลคาม, pronounced [pʰā.nōm śāla kʰāːm]). The word "Sala" (शाल) is Pali means sal tree (Shorea robusta) or resin tree (Dipterocarpus alatus). Phanam San is a name that corresponds to the geography that is full of resin trees. The word "Phanam San" means "grove of resin trees".

== Geography ==
Neighbouring districts are (from the east clockwise): Sanam Chai Khet, Plaeng Yao, Ratchasan of Chachoengsao Province; Si Mahosot and Si Maha Phot of Prachinburi province.

The important water resource is the Khlong Tha Lat.

== Economy ==
Ko Khanun Subdistrict has become a centre for recycling potentially hazardous electronic waste (e-waste), despite a June 2018 ban on imports of foreign e-waste to Thailand. China banned the import of foreign e-waste in 2018 also. Since the e-waste ban, 28 new recycling factories, most dealing with e-waste, have started in Chachoengsao Province, where Ko Khanun is located. In 2019, 14 businesses in Chachoengsao were granted licenses to process electronic waste, six of them in Ko Khanun in Phanom Sarakham District. An official of the Basel Action Network, which campaigns against dumping waste in poor countries, said, "E-waste has to go somewhere, and the Chinese are simply moving their entire operations to Southeast Asia. The only way to make money is to get huge volume with cheap, illegal labour and pollute the hell out of the environment," he added.

== Administration ==
=== Central administration ===
The district is divided into eight sub-districts (tambons), which are further subdivided into 87 administrative villages (mubans).

No.	Name	Thai	Villages	Pop.
1.	Ko Khanun	เกาะขนุน	15	15,999
2.	Ban Song	บ้านซ่อง	14	10,160
3.	Phanom Sarakham	พนมสารคาม	3	9,989
4.	Mueang Kao	เมืองเก่า	7	2,936
5.	Nong Yao	หนองยาว	12	9,256
6.	Tha Than	ท่าถ่าน	7	8,223
7.	Nong Nae	หนองแหน	15	9,919
8.	Khao Hin Son	เขาหินซ้อน	14	15,898

=== Local administration ===
There are five sub-district municipalities (thesaban tambons) in the district:

- Ban Song (Thai: เทศบาลตำบลบ้านซ่อง) consisting of sub-district Ban Song.
- Tha Than (Thai: เทศบาลตำบลท่าถ่าน) consisting of sub-district Tha Than.
- Ko Khanun (Thai: เทศบาลตำบลเกาะขนุน) consisting of parts of sub-district Ko Khanun.
- Khao Hin Son (Thai: เทศบาลตำบลเขาหินซ้อน) consisting of parts of sub-district Khao Hin Son.
- Phanom Sarakham (Thai: เทศบาลตำบลพนมสารคาม) consisting of parts of sub-district Phanom Sarakham.

There are six sub-district administrative organizations (SAO) in the district:

- Ko Khanun (Thai: องค์การบริหารส่วนตำบลเกาะขนุน) consisting of parts of sub-district Ko Khanun.
- Phanom Sarakham (Thai: องค์การบริหารส่วนตำบลพนมสารคาม) consisting of parts of sub-district Phanom Sarakham.
- Mueang Kao (Thai: องค์การบริหารส่วนตำบลเมืองเก่า) consisting of sub-district Mueang Kao.
- Nong Yao (Thai: องค์การบริหารส่วนตำบลหนองยาว) consisting of sub-district Nong Yao.
- Nong Nae (Thai: องค์การบริหารส่วนตำบลหนองแหน) consisting of sub-district Nong Nae.
- Khao Hin Son (Thai: องค์การบริหารส่วนตำบลเขาหินซ้อน) consisting of parts of sub-district Khao Hin Son.
