= Bo Thong district =

Bo Thong บ่อทอง
- District
- District location in Chonburi province
- Coordinates: 13°16′43″N 101°26′25″E
- Country: Thailand
- Province: Chonburi
- Seat: Bo Thong
- Tambon: 6

Area
  - Total: 781.6 km^{2} (301.8 sq mi)

Population (2015)
  - Total: 49,623
  - Density: 63.48/km^{2} (164.4/sq mi)
- Time zone: UTC+7 (ICT)
- Postal code: 20270
- Geocode: 2010

Bo Thong (Thai: บ่อทอง, pronounced [bɔ̀ː tʰɔ̄ːŋ]) is a district (amphoe) in Chonburi province, Thailand.

== History ==
Bo Thong was originally a tambon of Phanat Nikhom district. On 16 December 1978 the minor district (king amphoe) was created. On 16 March 1985 it was upgraded to a full district.

== Geography ==
Neighboring districts are (from the north clockwise) Ko Chan of Chonburi Province, Tha Takiap of Chachoengsao province, Kaeng Hang Maeo of Chanthaburi province, Khao Chamao and Wang Chan of Rayong province, and Nong Yai, Ban Bueng and Phanat Nikhom of Chonburi.

Khao Cha-ang (เขาชะอางค์) is an isolated limestone mountain standing on a plain in Bo Thong District. It is an important source of gold and antimony.

== Administration ==
The district is divided into six sub-districts (tambons), which are further subdivided into 47 villages (mubans). Bo Thong is a sub-district municipality (thesaban tambon) which covers parts of the tambons Bo Thong and Wat Suwan. That Thong is a sub-district municipality which covers the whole same-named sub-district. There are a further five tambon administrative organizations (TAO).

No.	Name	Thai	Villages	Pop.
1.	Bo Thong	บ่อทอง	9	13,509
2.	Wat Suwan	วัดสุวรรณ	7	6,185
3.	Bo Kwang Thong	บ่อกวางทอง	8	6,513
4.	That Thong	ธาตุทอง	9	7,500
5.	Kaset Suwan	เกษตรสุวรรณ	7	6,631
6.	Phluang Thong	พลวงทอง	7	7,850

== Economy ==
Bo Thong is the largest district of Chonburi. More than half of the area is greenspace. Therefore, there are no industrial plants in the area. The main occupation of residents is agriculture.
