= Tha Takiap district =

Tha Takiap ท่าตะเกียบ
- District
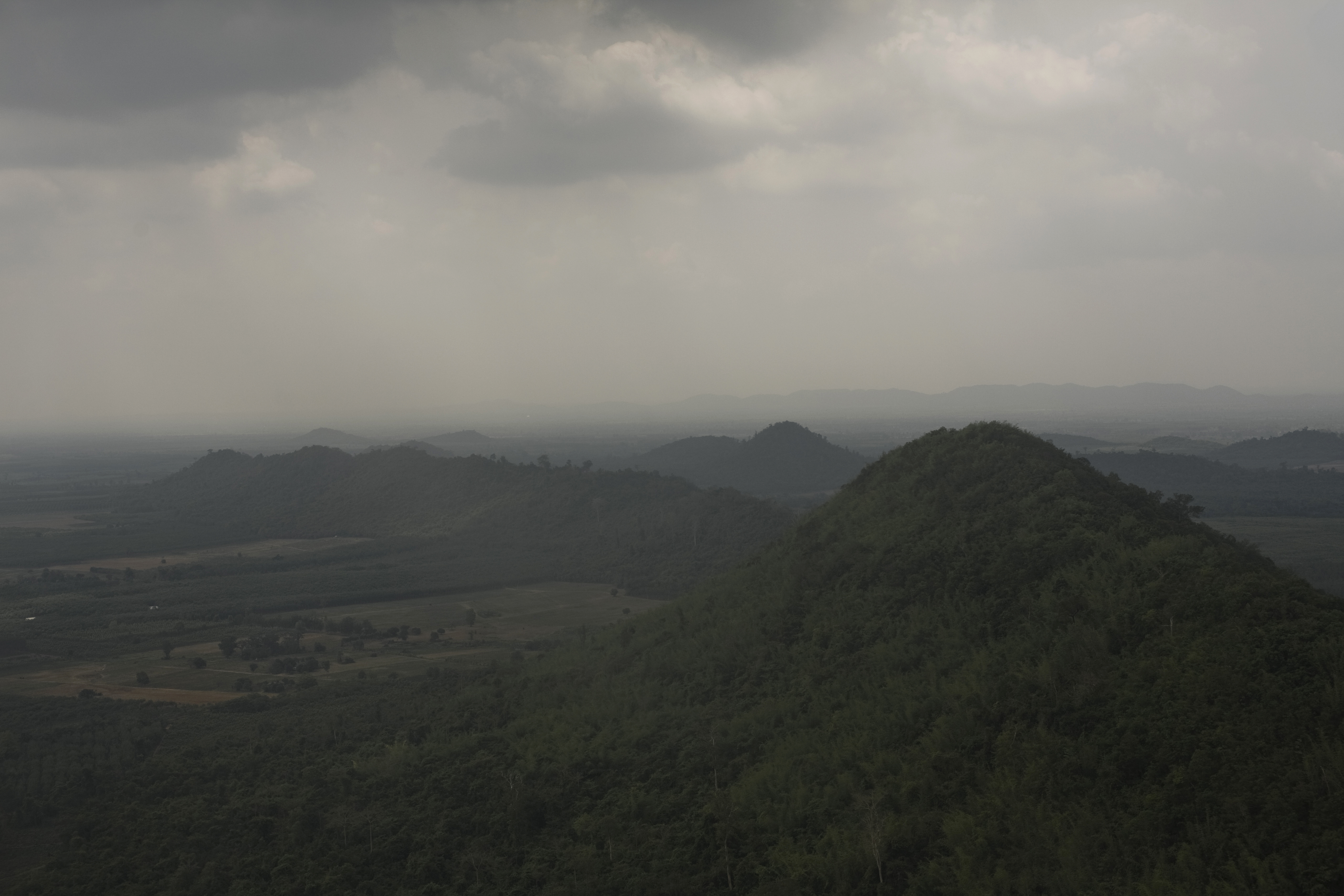
- Khao Ang Rue Nai Wildlife Sanctuary

- District location in Chachoengsao province
- Coordinates: 13°26′41″N 101°36′40″E
- Country: Thailand
- Province: Chachoengsao
- Seat: Tha Takiap

Area
  - Total: 1,521.54 km^{2} (587.47 sq mi)

Population (2017)
  - Total: 46,603
  - Density: 44.18/km^{2} (114.4/sq mi)
- Time zone: UTC+7 (ICT)
- Postal code: 24160
- Geocode: 2410

Tha Takiap (Thai: ท่าตะเกียบ, pronounced [tʰâː tā.kìa̯p]) is the easternmost district (amphoe) of Chachoengsao province, central Thailand.

== History ==
The minor district (king amphoe) Tha Takiap was established on 1 April 1991 by splitting off two tambons from Sanam Chai Khet district. It was upgraded to a full district on 5 December 1996.

== Geography ==
Neighboring districts are (from the north clockwise): Sanam Chai Khet of Chachoengsao Province; Khao Chakan, Wang Nam Yen, and Wang Sombun of Sa Kaeo province; Kaeng Hang Maeo of Chanthaburi province; and Bo Thong and Ko Chan of Chonburi province.

== Administration ==
=== Central administration ===
Tha Takiap is divided into two sub-districts (tambons), which are further subdivided into 47 administrative villages (mubans).

No.	Name	Thai	Villages	Pop.
1.	Tha Takiap	ท่าตะเกียบ	22	19,357
2.	Khlong Takrao	คลองตะเกรา	25	27,246

=== Local administration ===
There are two sub-district administrative organizations (SAO) in the district:

- Tha Takiap (Thai: องค์การบริหารส่วนตำบลท่าตะเกียบ) consisting of sub-district Tha Takiap.
- Khlong Takrao (Thai: องค์การบริหารส่วนตำบลคลองตะเกรา) consisting of sub-district Khlong Takrao.
