= Ratchasan district =

Ratchasan ราชสาส์น
- District
- District location in Chachoengsao province
- Coordinates: 13°46′56″N 101°16′54″E
- Country: Thailand
- Province: Chachoengsao
- Seat: Bang Kha

Area
  - Total: 134.9 km^{2} (52.1 sq mi)

Population (2017)
  - Total: 12,809
  - Density: 94.95/km^{2} (245.9/sq mi)
- Time zone: UTC+7 (ICT)
- Postal code: 24120
- Geocode: 2407

Ratchasan (Thai: ราชสาส์น, pronounced [râːt.t͡ɕʰā.sǎːn]) is a district (amphoe) in the central part of Chachoengsao province, central Thailand.

== History ==
The area of Ratchasan was separated from Phanom Sarakham district and became a minor district (king amphoe) on 16 February 1977. It was upgraded to a full district on 4 July 1994.

== Geography ==
Neighboring districts are (from the east clockwise): Phanom Sarakham, Plaeng Yao, and Bang Khla of Chachoengsao Province; and Ban Sang of Prachinburi province.

The important water resource is the Khlong Tha Lat.

== Administration ==
=== Central administration ===
Ratchasan is divided into three sub-districts (tambons), which are further subdivided into 31 administrative villages (mubans).

No.	Name	Thai	Villages	Pop.
1.	Bang Kha	บางคา	6	2,132
2.	Mueang Mai	เมืองใหม่	9	3,146
3.	Dong Noi	ดงน้อย	16	7,531

=== Local administration ===
There are three sub-district administrative organizations (SAO) in the district:

- Bang Kha (Thai: องค์การบริหารส่วนตำบลบางคา) consisting of sub-district Bang Kha.
- Mueang Mai (Thai: องค์การบริหารส่วนตำบลเมืองใหม่) consisting of sub-district Mueang Mai.
- Dong Noi (Thai: องค์การบริหารส่วนตำบลดงน้อย) consisting of sub-district Dong Noi.

== Economy ==
Palmyrum is a local important industrial crop. Ratchasan is famous for its palm sap.
