= Bang Khla district =

Bang Khla บางคล้า
- District
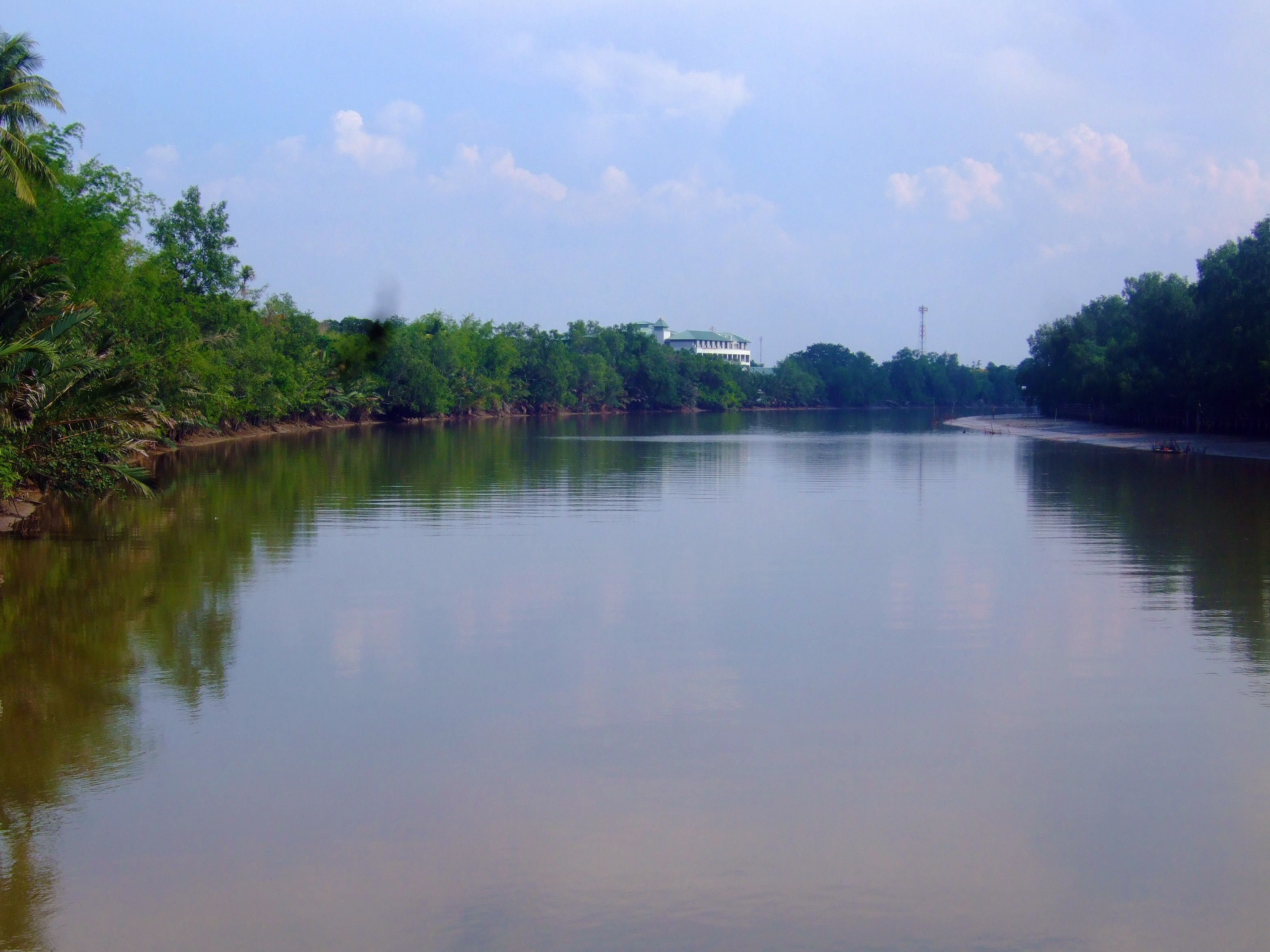
- The Bang Pakong River at the point where it confluences with Khlong Tha Lat, near the King Taksin Memorial in Pak Nam, Bang Khla

- District location in Chachoengsao province
- Coordinates: 13°43′41″N 101°12′29″E
- Country: Thailand
- Province: Chachoengsao

Area
  - Total: 227.9 km^{2} (88.0 sq mi)

Population (2017)
  - Total: 45,671
  - Density: 200.39/km^{2} (519.0/sq mi)
- Time zone: UTC+7 (ICT)
- Postal code: 24110
- Geocode: 2402

Bang Khla (Thai: บางคล้า, pronounced [bāːŋ kʰláː]) is a district (amphoe) of Chachoengsao province, central Thailand.

== History ==
Its history dates back to the late Ayutthaya period. Shortly before Ayutthaya's second fall in 1766, Bang Khla was a place where Phraya Tak (later King Taksin) and his troops passed through and stayed overnight.

During the early Rattanakosin period, before the reign of King Rama III, Bang Khla served as the administrative center of Chachoengsao, until the town was relocated to its present location.

The name "Bang Khla" roughly translates as "place of Khla". Khla is a type of mangrove plant (Calathea) that once grew abundantly along the banks of the Bang Pakong River. In addition, according to independent historian Sujit Wongthes, Bang Khla was formerly informally known as "Rong Khlao" (โรงเหล้า, lit. 'liquor factory') because several breweries were located there.

Bang Khla district was officially established in 1901. The district office was in Wat Mai Bang Khla, and in 2019 in Ban Suan Subdistrict. Bang Khla is the name of the village Ban Bang Khla, which is on the khlong ('canal') Bang Khla. As the district office was not in the center of the district area, the government moved it to Tao Sura, five kilometres from the old site. Later they changed the name of the tambon to Bang Khla to match the district name.

Bang Khla is also known for its mangoes. It is considered the original area for jasmine rice; however, due to changes in administrative boundaries, the area now recognized as the origin of jasmine rice is located in the neighboring Ban Pho district.

== Geography ==
Neighbouring districts are (from the east clockwise): Ratchasan, Plaeng Yao, Ban Pho, Mueang Chachoengsao, Khlong Khuean of Chachoengsao Province; and Ban Sang of Prachinburi province.

The important water resource is the Bang Pakong River.

== Administration ==
=== Central administration ===
Bang Khla is divided into nine subdistricts (tambons), which are further subdivided into 56 administrative villages (mubans).

No.	Name	Thai	Villages	Pop.
1.	Bang Khla	บางคล้า	-	9,412
4.	Bang Suan	บางสวน	4	2,050
8.	Bang Krachet	บางกระเจ็ด	9	4,519
9.	Pak Nam	ปากน้ำ	12	5,545
10.	Tha Thonglang	ท่าทองหลาง	6	4,665
11.	Sao Cha-ngok	สาวชะโงก	6	3,076
12.	Samet Nuea	เสม็ดเหนือ	6	4,920
13.	Samet Tai	เสม็ดใต้	6	5,248
14.	Hua Sai	หัวไทร	7	6,236

Missing numbers are the tambons which now form the Khlong Khuean District.

=== Local administration ===
There are two subdistrict municipalities (thesaban tambons) in the district:

- Bang Khla (Thai: เทศบาลตำบลบางคล้า) consisting of subdistrict Bang Khla.
- Pak Nam (Thai: เทศบาลตำบลปากน้ำ) consisting of subdistrict Pak Nam.

There are seven subdistrict administrative organizations (SAO) in the district:

- Bang Suan (Thai: องค์การบริหารส่วนตำบลบางสวน) consisting of subdistrict Bang Suan.
- Bang Krachet (Thai: องค์การบริหารส่วนตำบลบางกระเจ็ด) consisting of subdistrict Bang Krachet.
- Tha Thonglang (Thai: องค์การบริหารส่วนตำบลท่าทองหลาง) consisting of subdistrict Tha Thonglang.
- Sao Cha-ngok (Thai: องค์การบริหารส่วนตำบลสาวชะโงก) consisting of subdistrict Sao Cha-ngok.
- Samet Nuea (Thai: องค์การบริหารส่วนตำบลเสม็ดเหนือ) consisting of subdistrict Samet Nuea.
- Samet Tai (Thai: องค์การบริหารส่วนตำบลเสม็ดใต้) consisting of subdistrict Samet Tai.
- Hua Sai (Thai: องค์การบริหารส่วนตำบลหัวไทร) consisting of subdistrict Hua Sai.

== Sources ==
- Bang Khla district history (Thai)
