= Bang Pakong district =

Bang Pakong บางปะกง
- District
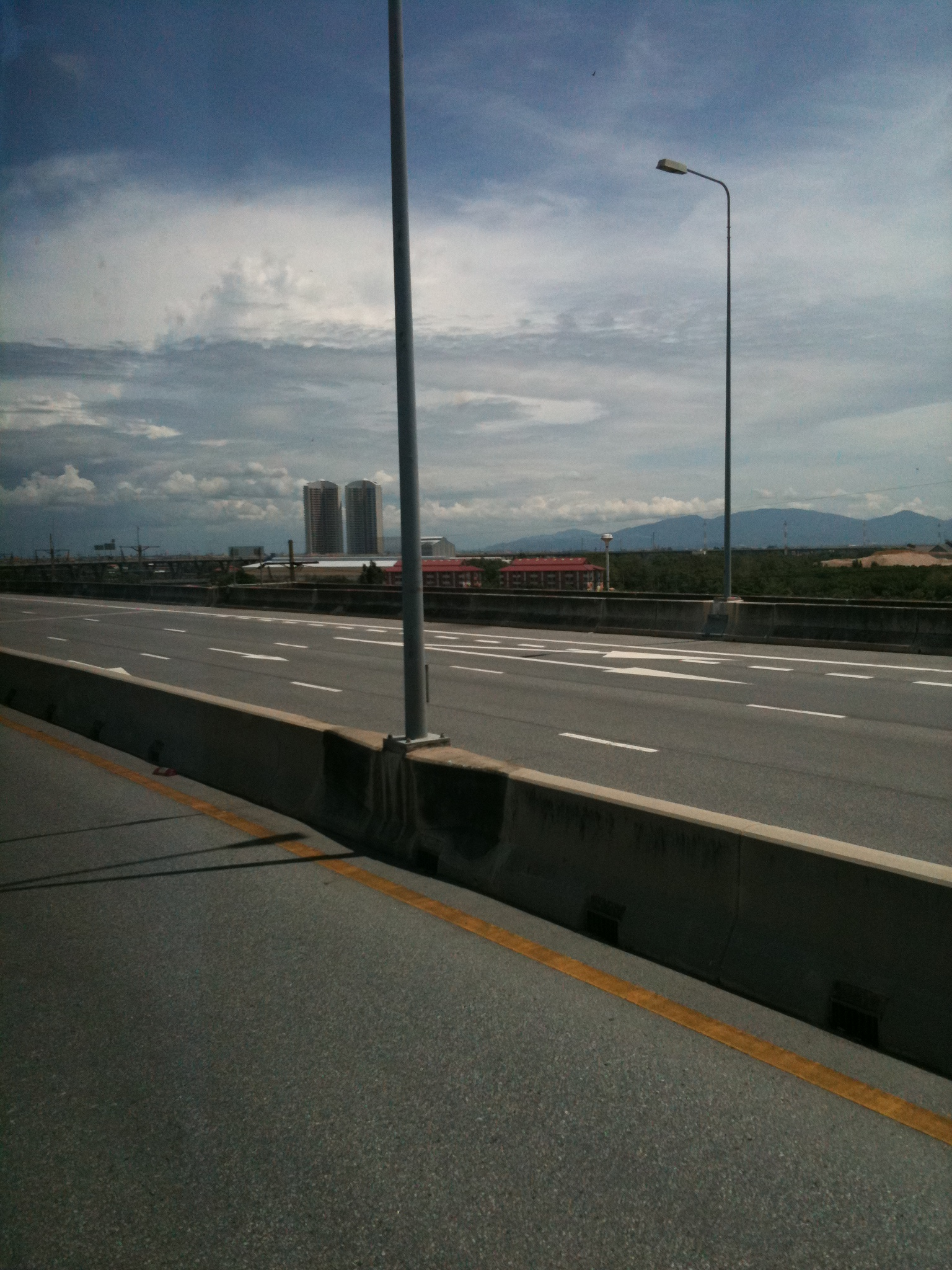
- View from Bang Na - Chonburi Expy Tool Road

- District location in Chachoengsao province
- Coordinates: 13°32′34″N 100°59′38″E
- Country: Thailand
- Province: Chachoengsao
- Seat: Tha Sa-an

Area
  - Total: 257.893 km^{2} (99.573 sq mi)

Population (2017)
  - Total: 90,775
  - Density: 351.98/km^{2} (911.6/sq mi)
- Time zone: UTC+7 (ICT)
- Postal code: 24130
- Geocode: 2404

Bang Pakong (Thai: บางปะกง, pronounced [bāːŋ pā.kōŋ]) is a district (amphoe) in the western part of Chachoengsao province in central Thailand.

Bang Pakong District's name comes from the Bang Pakong River. The area has many industrial estates, including the huge gas- and oil-fired Bang Pakong Power Station, and a 180 rai Carabao energy drink production center.

== History ==
Bang Pakong district was established in 1907. The first temporary district office was a building within the Wat Bon Khongkharam. In 1908 the government moved the office to the bank of the Bang Pakong River in Tambon Tha Sa-an, which is still the location today.

== Geography ==
Neighboring districts are (from the north clockwise): Ban Pho of Chachoengsao Province, Phan Thong and Mueang Chon Buri of Chon Buri province, the Bay of Bangkok, and Samut Prakan province.

The important water resource is the Bang Pakong River, which empties into the Bay of Bangkok. The Bang Na-Trat Highway runs through the district.

== Environment ==
The Marine Department of Thailand's Transport Ministry commissioned a 6.9 million baht study in 2019 which focuses on dredging a section of the 231 kilometre-long Bang Pakong River in the district. The study is to be completed by January 2020. The purpose of the proposed development is to enable the shipment of goods from Prachinburi and Sa Kaeo as part of the Eastern Economic Corridor (EEC) project.

== Economy ==
Carabao Group completed work on a new energy drink production center in Bang Pakong District in mid-2018. The 8.7 billion baht, 180 rai facility includes a glass bottle plant, an aluminum can plant, and a bottling plant. Bottle production will increase to 1.6 billion bottles per year, up from 1 billion, and can production will increase from 800 million per year to 1.5 billion. Future plans include a fourth factory on the site.

== Administration ==
=== Central administration ===
Bang Pakong is divided into 12 sub-districts (tambons), which are further subdivided into 99 administrative villages (muban).

No.	Name	Thai	Villages	Pop.
1.	Bang Pakong	บางปะกง	10	14,975
2.	Tha Sa-an	ท่าสะอ้าน	8	8,624
3.	Bang Wua	บางวัว	14	12,873
4.	Bang Samak	บางสมัคร	9	15,903
5.	Bang Phueng	บางผึ้ง	7	2,188
6.	Bang Kluea	บางเกลือ	7	4,219
7.	Song Khlong	สองคลอง	10	9,551
8.	Nong Chok	หนองจอก	9	3,689
9.	Phimpha	พิมพา	4	3,331
10.	Tha Kham	ท่าข้าม	8	7,672
11.	Hom Sin	หอมศีล	6	5,174
12.	Khao Din	เขาดิน	7	2,576

=== Local administration ===
There are 10 sub-district municipalities (thesaban tambons) in the district:

- Bang Pakong Phrom Thep Rangsan (Thai: เทศบาลตำบลบางปะกงพรหมเทพรังสรรค์) consisting of parts of sub-district Bang Pakong.
- Bang Samak (Thai: เทศบาลตำบลบางสมัคร) consisting of parts of sub-district Bang Samak.
- Bang Phueng (Thai: เทศบาลตำบลบางผึ้ง) consisting of the sub-district Bang Phueng.
- Tha Kham (Thai: เทศบาลตำบลท่าข้าม) consisting of the sub-district Tha Kham.
- Tha Sa-an (Thai: เทศบาลตำบลท่าสะอ้าน) consisting of parts of sub-district Tha Sa-an.
- Hom Sin (Thai: เทศบาลตำบลหอมศีล) consisting of parts of sub-district Hom Sin.
- Bang Pakong (Thai: เทศบาลตำบลบางปะกง) consisting of parts of sub-district Bang Pakong.
- Bang Wua (Thai: เทศบาลตำบลบางวัว) consisting of parts of the sub-districts Bang Wua, Bang Samak, Bang Kluea.
- Phimpha (Thai: เทศบาลตำบลพิมพา) consisting of the sub-district Phimpha.
- Bang Wua Khana Rak (Thai: เทศบาลตำบลบางวัวคณารักษ์) consisting of parts of sub-district Bang Wua.

There are six sub-district administrative organizations (SAO) in the district:

- Tha Sa-an (Thai: องค์การบริหารส่วนตำบลท่าสะอ้าน) consisting of parts of sub-district Tha Sa-an.
- Bang Kluea (Thai: องค์การบริหารส่วนตำบลบางเกลือ) consisting of parts of sub-district Bang Kluea.
- Song Khlong (Thai: องค์การบริหารส่วนตำบลสองคลอง) consisting of sub-district Song Khlong.
- Nong Chok (Thai: องค์การบริหารส่วนตำบลหนองจอก) consisting of sub-district Nong Chok.
- Hom Sin (Thai: องค์การบริหารส่วนตำบลหอมศีล) consisting of parts of sub-district Hom Sin.
- Khao Din (Thai: องค์การบริหารส่วนตำบลเขาดิน) consisting of sub-district Khao Din.
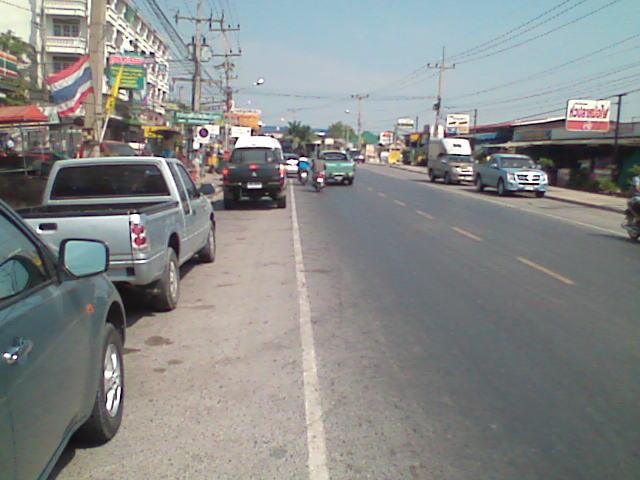
Downtown Bang Pakong

Bangwua Street, Bang Pakong

Bangna-Bangpakong Road, Bang Pakong

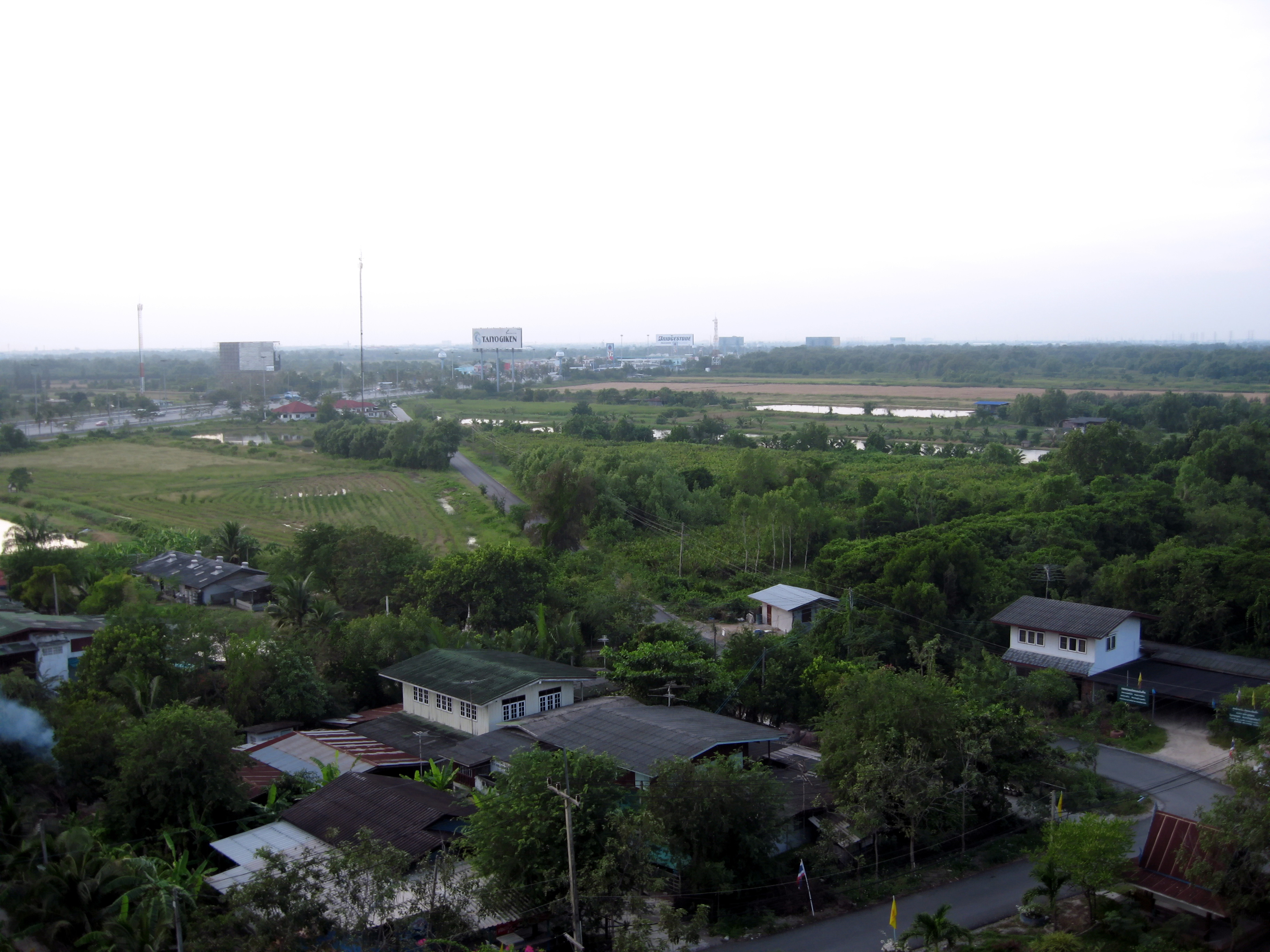
Tambon Khao Din and Motorway 7
