= Ko Chan district =

Ko Chan เกาะจันทร์
- District
- District location in Chonburi province
- Coordinates: 13°25′3″N 101°20′4″E
- Country: Thailand
- Province: Chonburi
- Seat: Ko Chan
- Tambon: 2

Area
  - Total: 248.8 km^{2} (96.1 sq mi)

Population (2015)
  - Total: 37,113
  - Density: 149.16/km^{2} (386.3/sq mi)
- Time zone: UTC+7 (ICT)
- Postal code: 20240
- Geocode: 2011

Ko Chan (Thai: เกาะจันทร์, pronounced [kɔ̀ʔ t͡ɕān]) is a district (amphoe) in the Chonburi Province, Thailand.

== History ==
A minor district was created on 18 May 2000 by splitting the eastern part off from Phanat Nikhom district.

The Thai government on 15 May 2007 upgraded all 81 minor districts to full districts. With publication in the Royal Gazette on 24 August the upgrade became official.

== Geography ==
Neighboring districts are (from the north clockwise) Plaeng Yao, Sanam Chai Khet and Tha Takiap of Chachoengsao province and Bo Thong and Phanat Nikhom of Chonburi Province.

== Administration ==
The district is divided into two sub-districts (tambons), which are further subdivided into 27 villages (mubans). Ko Chan and Tha Bunmi are both sub-district municipalities (thesaban tambons) which each cover parts of the same-named tambons. There are a further two tambon administrative organizations (TAO).

No.	Name	Thai name	Villages	Pop.
1.	Ko Chan	เกาะจันทร์	15	18352
2.	Tha Bun Mi	ท่าบุญมี	12	16549
