= Khlong Khuean district =

Khlong Khuean คลองเขื่อน
- District
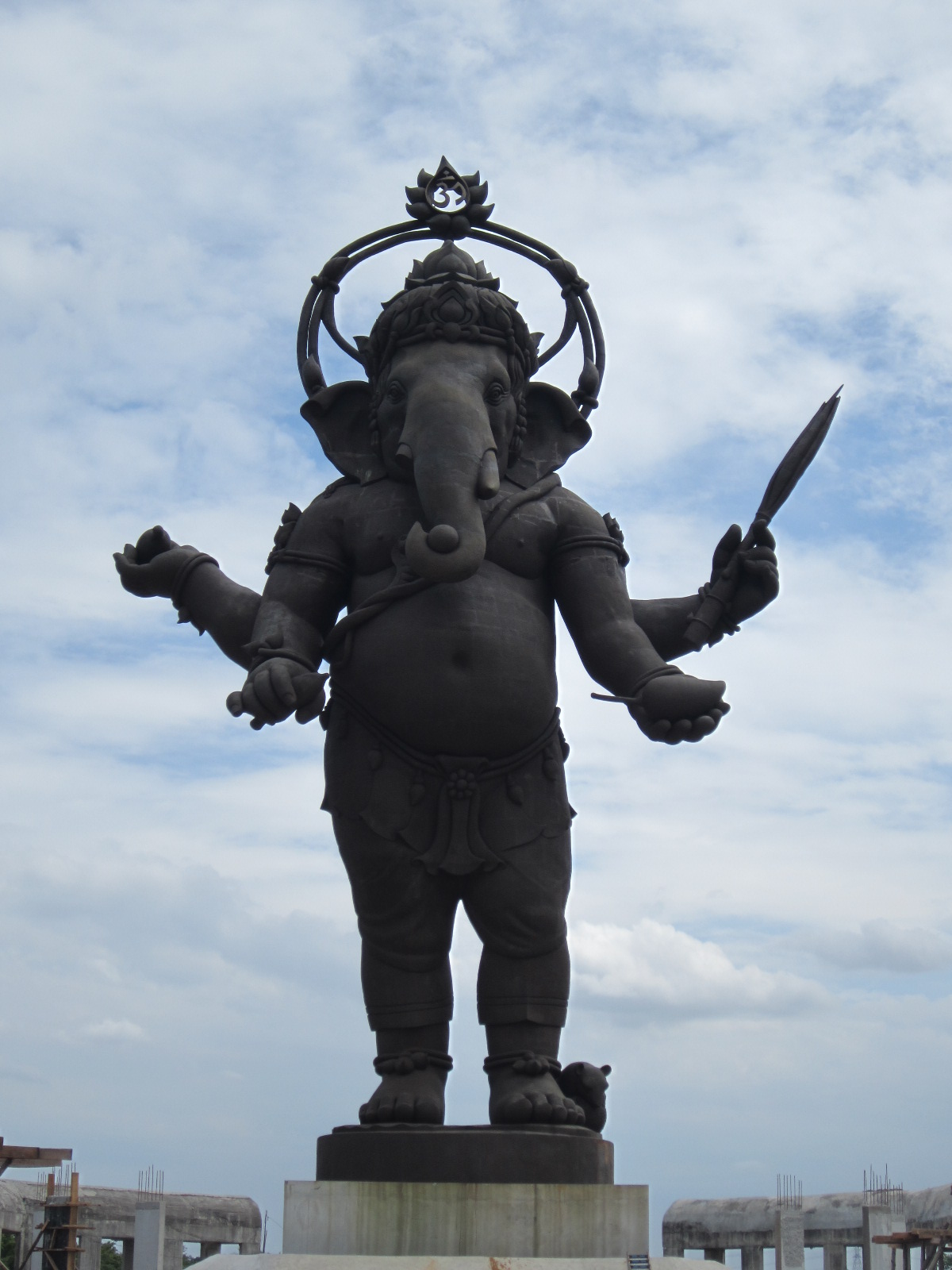
- Bronze Ganesh at the Khlong Khuean Ganesh International Park

- District location in Chachoengsao province
- Coordinates: 13°47′29″N 101°9′47″E
- Country: Thailand
- Province: Chachoengsao
- Seat: Khlong Khuean

Area
  - Total: 127.4 km^{2} (49.2 sq mi)

Population (2017)
  - Total: 13,065
  - Density: 102.55/km^{2} (265.6/sq mi)
- Time zone: UTC+7 (ICT)
- Postal code: 24000
- Geocode: 2411

Khlong Khuean (Thai: คลองเขื่อน, pronounced [kʰlɔ̄ːŋ kʰɯ̀a̯n]) is a district (amphoe) of Chachoengsao province, central Thailand.

== Etymology ==
Khlong means 'canal' or 'river'. Khuean means 'dam'. Khlong Khuean and the Chachoengsao area are on the banks of Bang Pakong River. Thus, Khlong Khuean means the 'dam on the river'.

== History ==
The district was created on 31 May 1993 by splitting it from Bang Khla district.

On 15 May 2007, all 81 minor districts were upgraded to full districts. On 24 August the upgrade became official.

== Geography ==
Neighboring districts are (from the east clockwise): Bang Khla, Mueang Chachoengsao, and Bang Nam Priao of Chachoengsao Province and Ban Sang of Prachinburi province.

The important water resource is the Bang Pakong River.

== Administration ==
=== Central administration ===
Khlong Khuean is divided into five sub-districts (tambons), which are further subdivided into 32 administrative villages (mubans).

No.	Name	Thai	Villages	Pop.
1.	Kon Kaeo	ก้อนแก้ว	6	3,106
2.	Khlong Khuean	คลองเขื่อน	6	3,537
3.	Bang Lao	บางเล่า	6	1,943
4.	Bang Rong	บางโรง	7	2,240
5.	Bang Talat	บางตลาด	7	2,239

=== Local administration ===
There are five sub-district administrative organizations (SAO) in the district:

- Kon Kaeo (Thai: องค์การบริหารส่วนตำบลก้อนแก้ว) consisting of sub-district Kon Kaeo.
- Khlong Khuean (Thai: องค์การบริหารส่วนตำบลคลองเขื่อน) consisting of sub-district Khlong Khuean.
- Bang Lao (Thai: องค์การบริหารส่วนตำบลบางเล่า) consisting of sub-district Bang Lao.
- Bang Rong (Thai: องค์การบริหารส่วนตำบลบางโรง) consisting of sub-district Bang Rong.
- Bang Talat (Thai: องค์การบริหารส่วนตำบลบางตลาด) consisting of sub-district Bang Talat.
