= Sanam Chai Khet district =

Sanam Chai Khet สนามชัยเขต
- District
- District location in Chachoengsao province
- Coordinates: 13°39′30″N 101°26′20″E
- Country: Thailand
- Province: Chachoengsao
- Seat: Khu Yai Mi

Area
  - Total: 1,666.0 km^{2} (643.2 sq mi)

Population (2017)
  - Total: 74,613
  - Density: 44.78/km^{2} (116.0/sq mi)
- Time zone: UTC+7 (ICT)
- Postal code: 24160
- Geocode: 2408

Sanam Chai Khet (Thai: สนามชัยเขต, pronounced [sā.nǎːm t͡ɕʰāj kʰèːt]) is a district (amphoe) in the eastern part of Chachoengsao province, central Thailand.

== History ==
Mueang Sanam Chai Khet was a city of the Ayutthaya Kingdom, a contemporary of neighboring Mueang Phanat Nikhom and Phanom Sarakham.

Being part of Phanom Sarakham district, on 6 January 1966 the three tambons, Khu Yai Mi, Tha Kradan, and Tha Takiap, were split off to form the minor district (king amphoe) Sanam Chai (สนามไชย). It was renamed Sanam Chai Ket on 14 December 1972, and upgraded to a full district on 28 June 1973.

== Geography ==
Neighboring districts are (from the west clockwise): Plaeng Yao and Phanom Sarakham of Chachoengsao Province; Si Maha Phot and Kabin Buri of Prachinburi province; Khao Chakan of Sa Kaeo province; Tha Takiap of Chachoengsao Province; and Ko Chan of Chonburi province.

== Administration ==
=== Central administration ===
Sanam Chai Khet is divided into four sub-districts (tambons), which are further subdivided into 70 administrative villages (mubans).

No.	Name	Thai	Villages	Pop.
1.	Khu Yai Mi	คู้ยายหมี	17	16,459
2.	Tha Kradan	ท่ากระดาน	23	30,861
3.	Thung Phraya	ทุ่งพระยา	19	16,516
5.	Lat Krathing	ลาดกระทิง	11	10,777

Missing numbers are tambon which now form Tha Takiap.

=== Local administration ===
There is one sub-district municipality (thesaban tambon) in the district, Sanam Chai Khet (Thai: เทศบาลตำบลสนามชัยเขต) consisting of parts of sub-district Khu Yai Mi.

There are four sub-district administrative organizations (SAO) in the district:

- Khu Yai Mi (Thai: องค์การบริหารส่วนตำบลคู้ยายหมี) consisting of parts of sub-district Khu Yai Mi.
- Tha Kradan (Thai: องค์การบริหารส่วนตำบลท่ากระดาน) consisting of sub-district Tha Kradan.
- Thung Phraya (Thai: องค์การบริหารส่วนตำบลทุ่งพระยา) consisting of sub-district Thung Phraya.
- Lat Krathing (Thai: องค์การบริหารส่วนตำบลลาดกระทิง) consisting of sub-district Lat Krathing.
