= Ban Pho district =

Ban Pho บ้านโพธิ์
- District
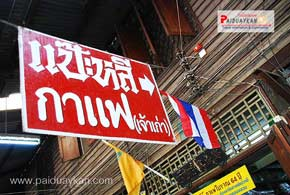
- Sign of Pae Li, an old-fashioned coffee shop in Khlong Suan Market, an old riverside market straddling both Samut Prakan (Bang Bo) and Chachoengsao (Ban Pho)

- District location in Chachoengsao province
- Coordinates: 13°35′59″N 101°4′43″E
- Country: Thailand
- Province: Chachoengsao

Area
  - Total: 217.593 km^{2} (84.013 sq mi)

Population (2017)
  - Total: 52,525
  - Density: 241.39/km^{2} (625.2/sq mi)
- Time zone: UTC+7 (ICT)
- Postal code: 24140
- Geocode: 2405

Ban Pho (Thai: บ้านโพธิ์, pronounced [bâːn pʰōː]) is a district (amphoe) in the western part of Chachoengsao province, central Thailand.

== History ==
The district was established by separating part of Mueang Chachoengsao District in 1903, then named Sanam Chan (สนามจันทร์) by Prince Marubhongse Siribhadhana, the governor of Monthon Prachinburi. In the past Sanam Chan Subdistrict was on both banks of the Bang Pakong River. Around 1906 the government split the area on the left bank where the district office was located to create Ban Pho Subdistrict.

Later, when King Vajiravudh (Rama VI) built the Sanam Chan Palace in Nakhon Pathom in 1911, as the district name was pronounced the same as the Sanam Chan Palace, the government changed the district name to Khao Din District on 20 July 1914. Later they changed to be Ban Pho district in 1917.

The name Ban Pho refers to 'home of bodhi tree'.

== Geography ==
Neighboring districts are (from the north clockwise): Mueang Chachoengsao, Bang Khla, Plaeng Yao of Chachoengsao Province; Phanat Nikhom, Phan Thong of Chon Buri province; Bang Pakong of Chachoengsao Province; and Bang Bo of Samut Prakan province.

The important water resource is the Bang Pakong River.

== Administration ==
=== Central administration ===
Ban Pho is divided into 17 subdistricts (tambons), which are further subdivided into 73 administrative villages (mubans).

No.	Name	Thai	Villages	Pop.
1.	Ban Pho	บ้านโพธิ์	4	2,886
2.	Ko Rai	เกาะไร่	5	4,473
3.	Khlong Khut	คลองขุด	4	2,258
4.	Khlong Ban Pho	คลองบ้านโพธิ์	4	1,950
5.	Khlong Prawet	คลองประเวศ	3	3,430
6.	Don Sai	ดอนทราย	4	3,008
7.	Theppharat	เทพราช	6	6,121
8.	Tha Phlap	ท่าพลับ	4	1,297
9.	Nong Tin Nok	หนองตีนนก	5	3,012
10.	Nong Bua	หนองบัว	4	2,324
11.	Bang Son	บางซ่อน	3	1,447
12.	Bang Krut	บางกรูด	3	1,970
13.	Laem Pradu	แหลมประดู่	6	3,431
14.	Lat Khwang	ลาดขวาง	4	4,153
15.	Sanam Chan	สนามจันทร์	6	2,337
16.	Saen Phu Dat	แสนภูดาษ	3	4,492
17.	Sip Et Sok	สิบเอ็ดศอก	5	3,936

=== Local administration ===
There are four subdistrict municipalities (thesaban tambons) in the district:

- Lat Khwang (Thai: เทศบาลตำบลลาดขวาง) consisting of subdistrict Lat Khwang.
- Saen Phu Dat (Thai: เทศบาลตำบลแสนภูดาษ) consisting of subdistrict Saen Phu Dat.
- Theppharat (Thai: เทศบาลตำบลเทพราช) consisting of parts of subdistricts Ko Rai and Theppharat.
- Ban Pho (Thai: เทศบาลตำบลบ้านโพธิ์) consisting of subdistrict Ban Pho.

There are 12 subdistrict administrative organizations (SAO) in the district:

- Ko Rai (Thai: องค์การบริหารส่วนตำบลเกาะไร่) consisting of parts of subdistrict Ko Rai.
- Khlong Khut (Thai: องค์การบริหารส่วนตำบลคลองขุด) consisting of subdistrict Khlong Khut.
- Khlong Ban Pho (Thai: องค์การบริหารส่วนตำบลคลองบ้านโพธิ์) consisting of subdistrict Khlong Ban Pho, Bang Son.
- Khlong Prawet (Thai: องค์การบริหารส่วนตำบลคลองประเวศ) consisting of subdistrict Khlong Prawet.
- Don Sai (Thai: องค์การบริหารส่วนตำบลดอนทราย) consisting of subdistrict Don Sai.
- Theppharat (Thai: องค์การบริหารส่วนตำบลเทพราช) consisting of parts of subdistrict Theppharat.
- Nong Tin Nok (Thai: องค์การบริหารส่วนตำบลหนองตีนนก) consisting of subdistrict Nong Tin Nok.
- Nong Bua (Thai: องค์การบริหารส่วนตำบลหนองบัว) consisting of subdistrict Tha Phlap, Nong Bua.
- Bang Krut (Thai: องค์การบริหารส่วนตำบลบางกรูด) consisting of subdistrict Bang Krut.
- Laem Pradu (Thai: องค์การบริหารส่วนตำบลแหลมประดู่) consisting of subdistrict Laem Pradu.
- Sanam Chan (Thai: องค์การบริหารส่วนตำบลสนามจันทร์) consisting of subdistrict Sanam Chan.
- Sip Et Sok (Thai: องค์การบริหารส่วนตำบลสิบเอ็ดศอก) consisting of subdistrict Sip Et Sok.
