= Ban Bueng district =

Ban Bueng บ้านบึง
- District
- District location in Chonburi province
- Coordinates: 13°18′41″N 101°6′44″E
- Country: Thailand
- Province: Chonburi
- Seat: Ban Bueng
- Tambon: 8

Area
  - Total: 646.3 km^{2} (249.5 sq mi)

Population (2015)
  - Total: 103,904
  - Density: 160.76/km^{2} (416.4/sq mi)
- Time zone: UTC+7 (ICT)
- Postal code: 20170
- Geocode: 2002

Ban Bueng (Thai: บ้านบึง, pronounced [bâːn bɯ̄ŋ]) is a district (amphoe) of Chonburi province, Thailand.

== Geography ==
The district is in the center of Chonburi Province in the Khao Khiao Massif area.

Neighbouring districts are (from the north clockwise) Phan Thong, Phanat Nikhom, Bo Thong, Nong Yai, Si Racha and Mueang Chonburi.

== History ==
The district was created in 1921 as a minor district (king amphoe). 1938 it was elevated to full district status.

== Administration ==
The district is divided into eight sub-districts (tambons), which are further subdivided into 52 villages (mubans). Ban Bueng itself has town (thesaban mueang) status and covers parts of tambon Ban Bueng. Nong Phai Kaeo and Khlong Kio each have township (thesaban tambon) status, both townships covering parts of the same-named tambon.

No.	Name	Thai name	Villages	Pop.
1.	Ban Bueng	บ้านบึง	5	23,509
2.	Khlong Kio	คลองกิ่ว	9	18,955
3.	Map Phai	มาบไผ่	6	4,914
4.	Nong Samsak	หนองซ้ำซาก	4	5,386
5.	Nong Bon Daeng	หนองบอนแดง	6	5,566
6.	Nong Chak	หนองชาก	5	9,408
7.	Nong Irun	หนองอิรุณ	12	16,217
8.	Nong Phai Kaeo	หนองไผ่แก้ว	5	9,446

== Notable people ==
- Tanin Manoonsilp: Model and actor.
- Ratthapark Wilairot: Motorcycle road racer.
- Udom Taepanich: Comedian, Artist and Writer.
