= Nong Yai district =

Nong Yai หนองใหญ่
- District
- District location in Chonburi province
- Coordinates: 13°9′24″N 101°22′0″E
- Country: Thailand
- Province: Chonburi
- Seat: Nong Yai
- Tambon: 5

Area
  - Total: 397.5 km^{2} (153.5 sq mi)

Population (2015)
  - Total: 23,609
  - Density: 59.39/km^{2} (153.8/sq mi)
- Time zone: UTC+7 (ICT)
- Postal code: 20190
- Geocode: 2003

Nong Yai (Thai: หนองใหญ่, pronounced [nɔ̌ːŋ jàj]) is a district (amphoe) in the province Chonburi, Thailand.

== History ==
The minor district (king amphoe) Nong Yai was created on 1 December 1975. The three tambons, Nong Yai, Khlong Phlu, and Nong Suea Chang were split off from Ban Bueng district. It was upgraded to a full district on 13 July 1981.

== Geography ==
Neighboring districts are (from the south clockwise) Wang Chan and Pluak Daeng of Rayong province, Si Racha, Ban Bueng and Bo Thong of Chonburi Province.

== Administration ==
The district is divided into five sub-districts (tambons), which are further subdivided into 24 villages (mubans). Nong Yai is a township (thesaban tambon) which covers the whole tambon Nong Yai. There are a further four tambon administrative organizations (TAO).

No.	Name	Thai name	Villages	Pop.
1.	Nong Yai	หนองใหญ่	6	7,530
2.	Khlong Phlu	คลองพลู	4	3,645
3.	Nong Suea Chang	หนองเสือช้าง	5	4,106
4.	Hang Sung	ห้างสูง	5	3,333
5.	Khao Sok	เขาซก	4	3,370
