= Phan Thong district =

Phan Thong พานทอง
- District
- District location in Chonburi province
- Coordinates: 13°28′14″N 101°5′49″E
- Country: Thailand
- Province: Chonburi
- Seat: Phan Thong
- Tambon: 11
- Muban: 76

Area
  - Total: 173.0 km^{2} (66.8 sq mi)

Population (2015)
  - Total: 62,593
  - Density: 361.8/km^{2} (937/sq mi)
- Time zone: UTC+7 (ICT)
- Postal code: 20160
- Geocode: 2005

Phan Thong (Thai: พานทอง, pronounced [pʰāːn tʰɔ̄ːŋ]) is a district (amphoe) of the province of Chonburi in Thailand.

Neighbouring districts are (from north clockwise) Bang Pakong, Ban Pho (both Chachoengsao province), Phanat Nikhom, Ban Bueng and Mueang Chonburi.

== History & toponymy ==
The district is home to a large Catholic community. The community owns 10,000 rai of land in Ban Hua Pai of Tambon Khok Ki Non where the St Philip and St James Catholic Church is located. The church was founded by Francois Marie Guego, a French missionary who arrived in Thailand in 1867. His mission was to spread the Gospel in Chachoengsao. Today, more than 3,000 Catholics reside on the land. The community, the largest landholder in the area, is under pressure from developers to sell the property to feed the industrialization fostered by the Eastern Economic Corridor.

Its name Phan Thong literally translates to "golden pedestal tray". It is said that its name is distorted from the name of a local hunter (phran in Thai) "Thong", who led warlord Phraya Tak to flee the Burmese army from Ayutthaya to the eastern region during the second fall of Ayutthaya, before the counterattack and established himself as a new king Taksin the Great.

== Administration ==
=== Central administration ===
Phan Thong is divided into 11 sub-districts (tambons), which are further subdivided into 76 administrative villages (mubans).

No.	Name	Thai	Villages	Pop.
1.	Phan Thong	พานทอง	10	10,160
2.	Nong Tamlueng	หนองตำลึง	9	10,191
3.	Map Pong	มาบโป่ง	10	8,137
4.	Nong Kakha	หนองกะขะ	5	5,888
5.	Nong Hong	หนองหงษ์	6	5,999
6.	Khok Khi Non	โคกขี้หนอน	5	3,189
7.	Ban Kao	บ้านเก่า	7	3,597
8.	Na Pradu	หน้าประดู่	5	2,655
9.	Bang Nang	บางนาง	9	6,571
10.	Ko Loi	เกาะลอย	6	2,614
11.	Bang Hak	บางหัก	4	1,195

=== Local administration ===
There are two sub-district municipalities (thesaban tambons) in the district:

- Phan Thong (Thai: เทศบาลตำบลพานทอง) consisting of parts of sub-district Phan Thong.
- Nong Tamlueng (Thai: เทศบาลตำบลหนองตำลึง) consisting of sub-district Nong Tamlueng and parts of sub-districts Map Pong and Nong Kakha.

There are eight subdistrict administrative organisations (SAO) in the district:

- Phan Thong Nong Kakha (Thai: องค์การบริหารส่วนตำบลพานทองหนองกะขะ) consisting of parts of sub-districts Phan Thong and Nong Kakha.
- Map Pong (Thai: องค์การบริหารส่วนตำบลมาบโป่ง) consisting of parts of sub-district Map Pong.
- Nong Hong (Thai: องค์การบริหารส่วนตำบลหนองหงษ์) consisting of sub-district Nong Hong.
- Khok Khi Non (Thai: องค์การบริหารส่วนตำบลโคกขี้หนอน) consisting of sub-district Khok Khi Non.
- Ban Kao (Thai: องค์การบริหารส่วนตำบลบ้านเก่า) consisting of sub-district Ban Kao.
- Na Pradu (Thai: องค์การบริหารส่วนตำบลหน้าประดู่) consisting of sub-district Na Pradu.
- Bang Nang (Thai: องค์การบริหารส่วนตำบลบางนาง) consisting of sub-district Bang Nang.
- Ko Loi Bang Hak (Thai: องค์การบริหารส่วนตำบลเกาะลอยบางหัก) consisting of sub-districts Ko Loi and Bang Hak.
