= Chachoengsao province =

Province of Thailand

Coordinates: 13°41′15″N 101°04′13″E

Chachoengsao ฉะเชิงเทรา
- Province

Other transcription(s)
  - Chinese: 北柳 p˭ǎ li̯ù (Teochew Peng'im) pak liú (Hokkien POJ); Běiliǔ (Mandarin Pinyin)
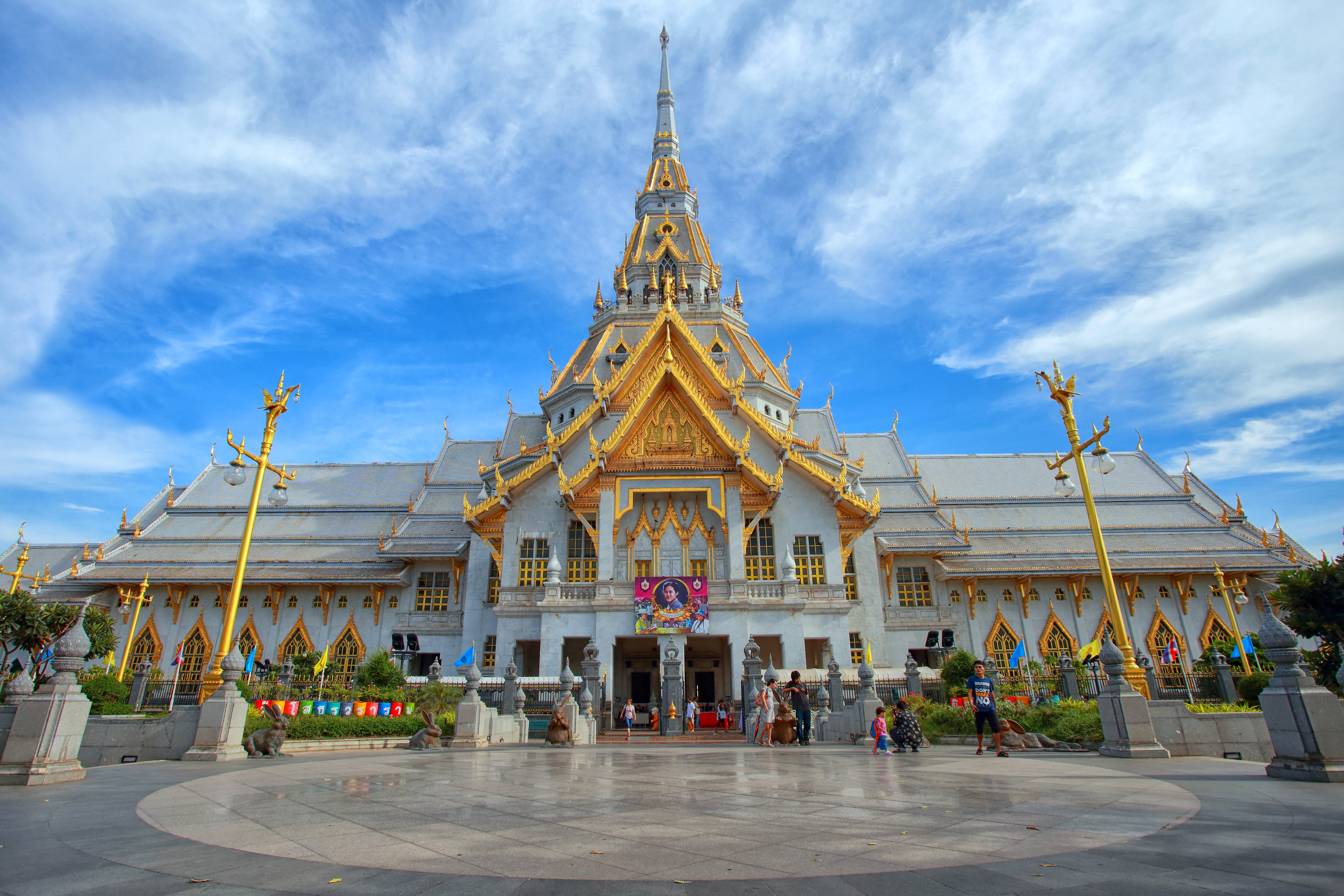
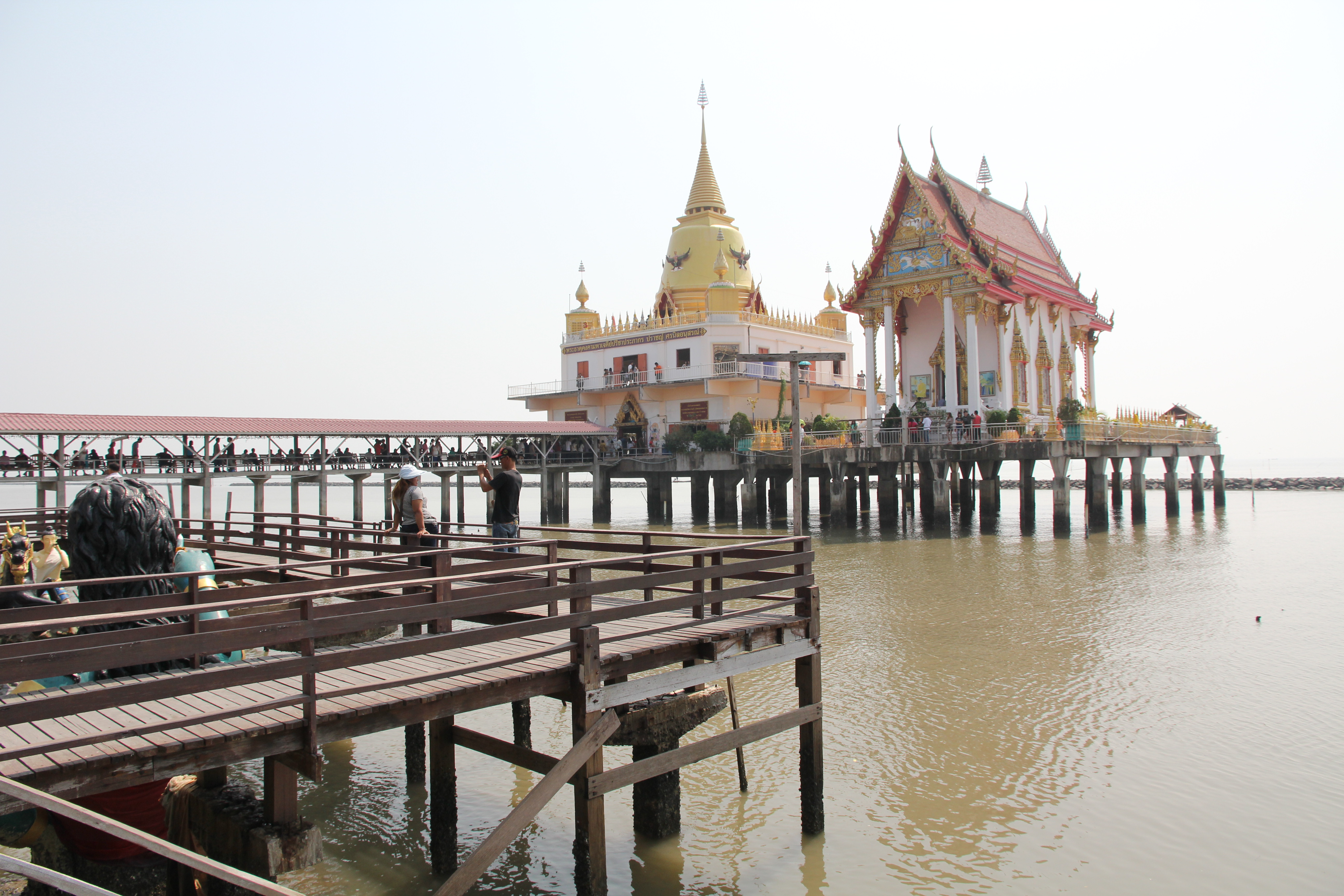
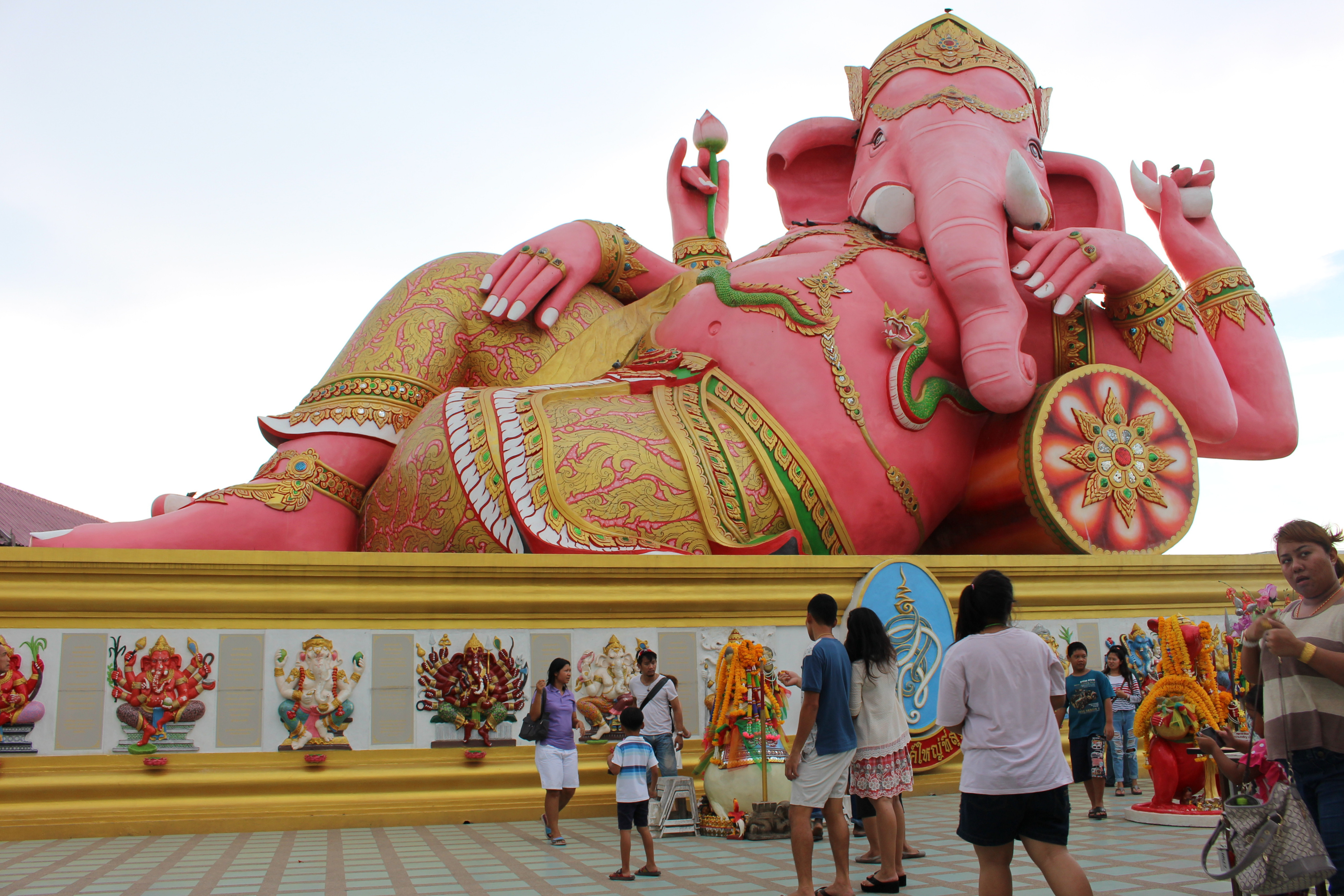
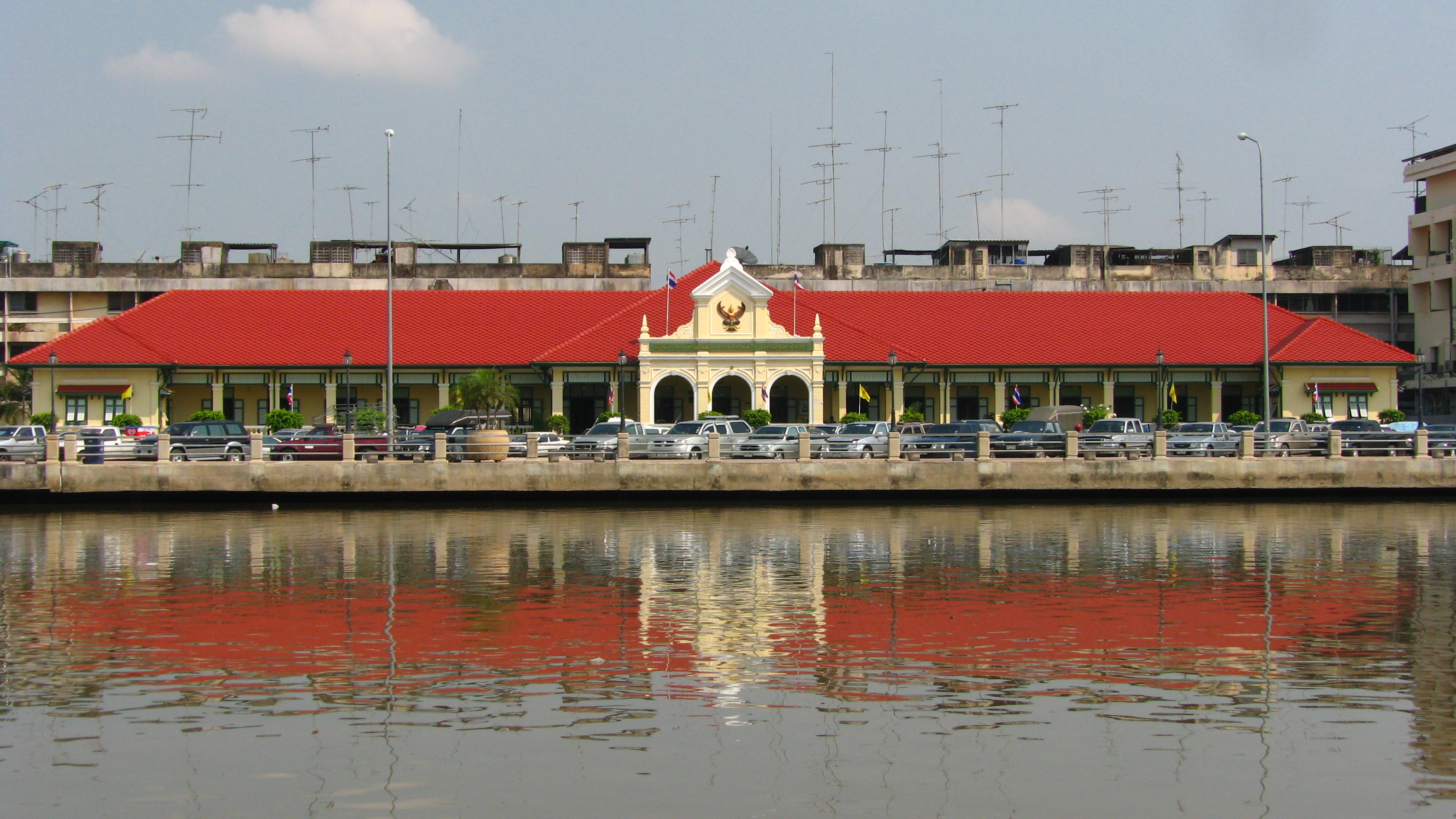
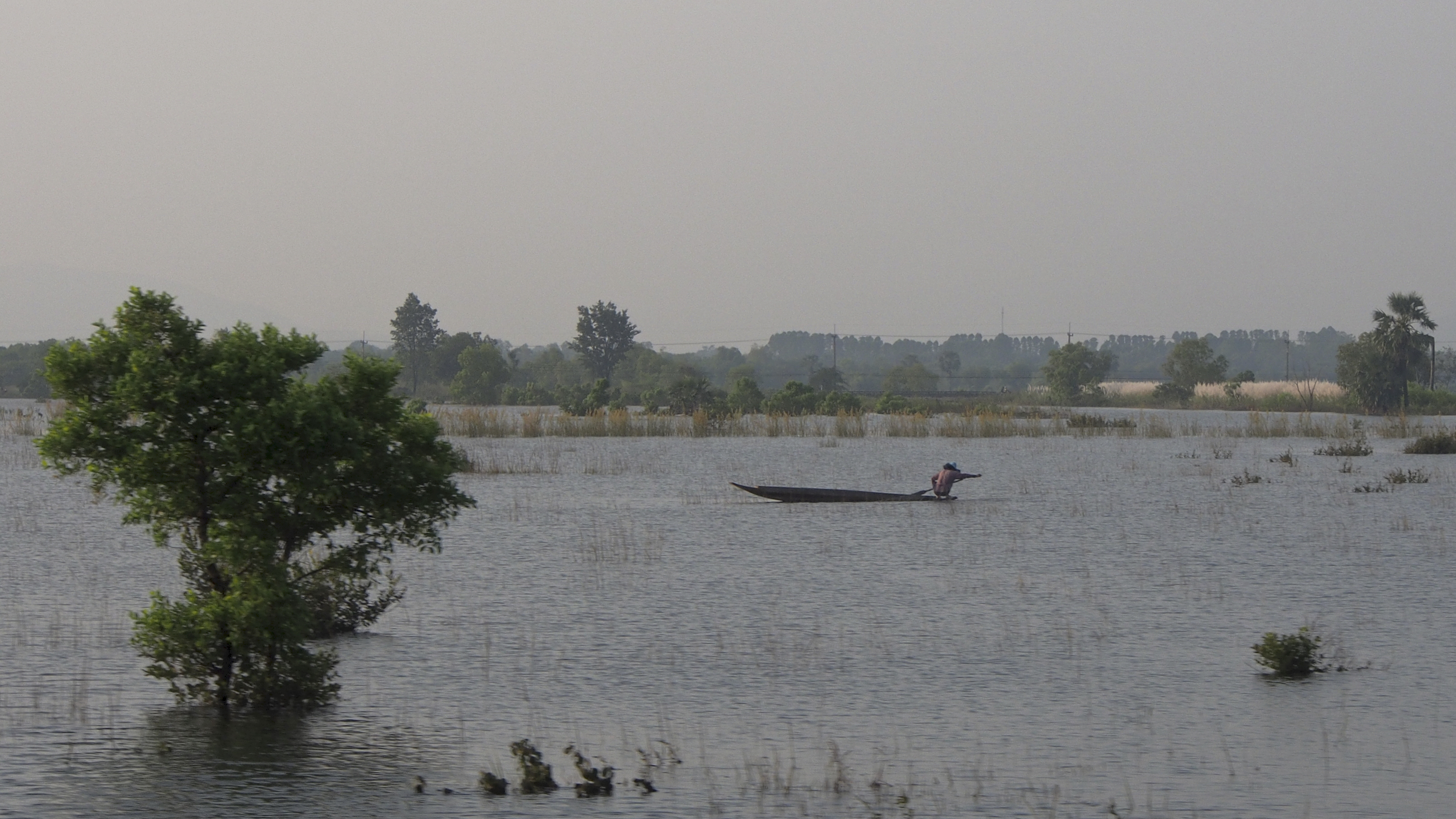
- (clockwise from upper left) Wat Sothonwararam, Ganesha of Wat Saman Rattanaram, view of Chachoengsao from the Eastern Railway, the old provincial hall, Wat Hong Thong

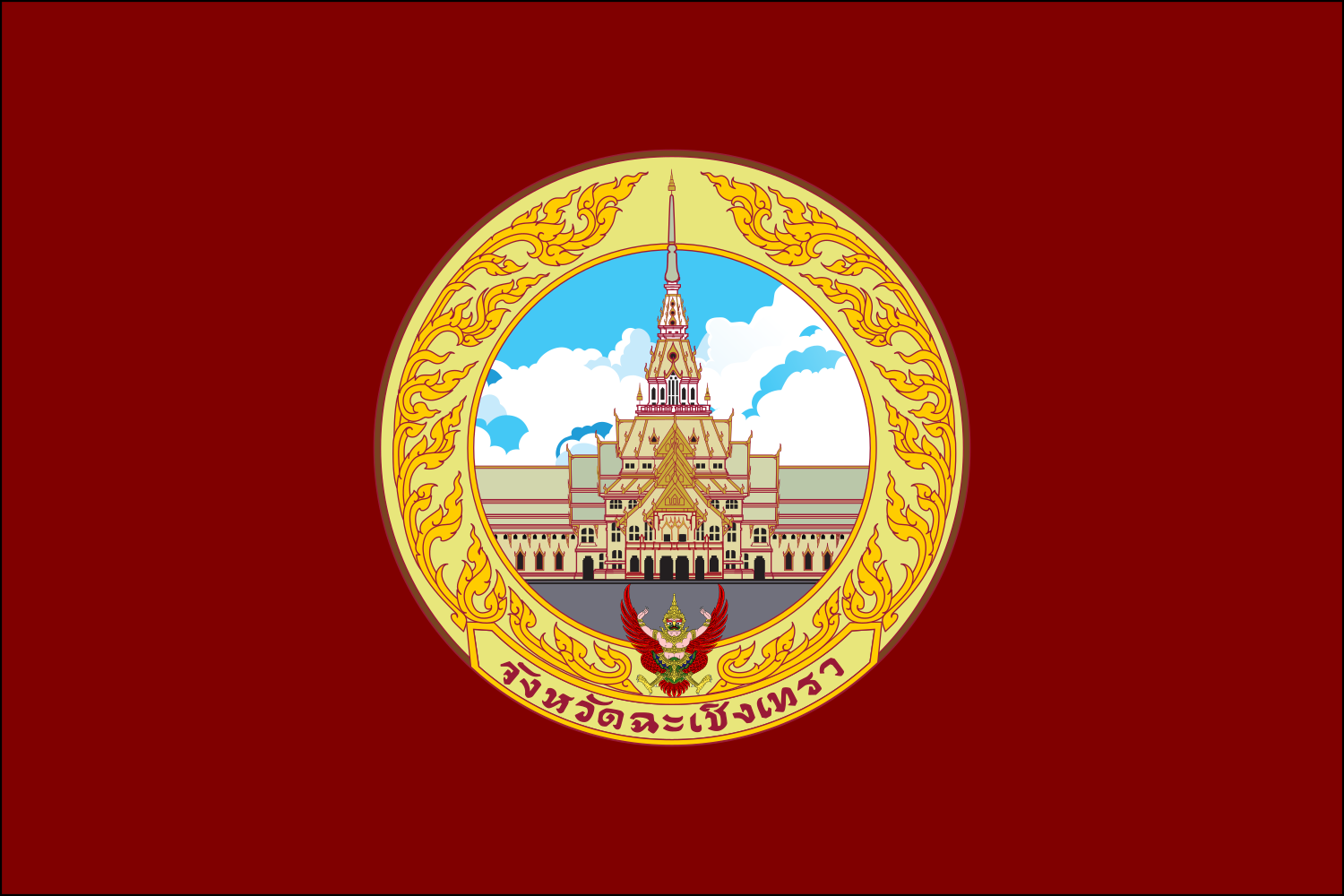
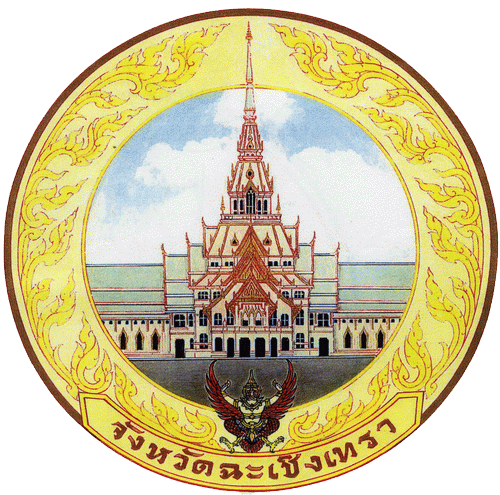
- Flag Seal
- Nickname: Paet Riu (Thai: แปดริ้ว)
- Mottoes: แม่น้ำบางปะกงแหล่งชีวิต พระศักดิ์สิทธิ์หลวงพ่อโสธร พระยาศรีสุนทรปราชญ์ภาษาไทย อ่างฤๅไนป่าสมบูรณ์ ("The bountiful Bang Pakong River. The sacred image of Luang Pho Sothon. Phraya Sri Sunthon, the scholar of Thai language. The rich forests of Ang Rue Nai.")
- Map of Thailand highlighting Chachoengsao province
- Country: Thailand
- Capital: Chachoengsao town

Government
  - Type: Province and Provincial Administrative Organization
  - Body: Chachoengsao Province and Chachoengsao Provincial Administrative Organization
  - Governor: Kajonkiet Rakpanitmanee
  - PAO Chief Executive: Kolayuth Chaisang

Area
  - Total: 5,169 km^{2} (1,996 sq mi)
  - Rank: 44th

Population (2024)
  - Total: ▼733,131
  - Rank: 34th
  - Density: 142/km^{2} (370/sq mi)
  - Rank: 28th

Human Achievement Index
  - HAI (2022): 0.6676 "high" Ranked 8th

GDP
  - Total: baht 341 billion (US$12 billion) (2019)
- Time zone: UTC+7 (ICT)
- Postal code: 24xxx
- Calling code: 038
- ISO 3166 code: TH-24
- Website: chachoengsao.go.th cpao.go.th

Chachoengsao (Thai: ฉะเชิงเทรา, pronounced [t͡ɕʰàʔ.t͡ɕʰɤ̄ːŋ.sāw]) is one of Thailand's seventy-seven provinces (changwat), located in eastern Thailand.

== History ==
Chachoengsao or Paet Riu ('eight stripes') is a province in eastern Thailand. It has a history dating back to the reign of King Borommatrailokkanat in the mid-Ayutthaya period. People originally settled by the Bang Pakong River and along canals. Chachoengsao, Paet Riu, has a history dating back to the reign of King Borommatrailokkanat in the Ayutthaya period. Most people have settled by the Bang Pakong River and along canals. "Luangpho Phuttha Sothon" is a centre of faith of the people of Paet Riu. In the past, Chachoengsao was a fourth class city under the ministry of defence. During the reign of King Rama I, it was attached to the ministry of the interior. During the reign of King Rama V, who changed the administration system, Chachoengsao became a city in the Prachin Buri Circle. In 1916, its status was changed from a city to a province. "Chachoengsao" is a Chong word which means "deep canal". The name "Paet Riu" comes from the story that the city once teemed with giant snakehead fish; up to eight cuts were required on the sides in the making of sun-dried fish.

== Geography ==
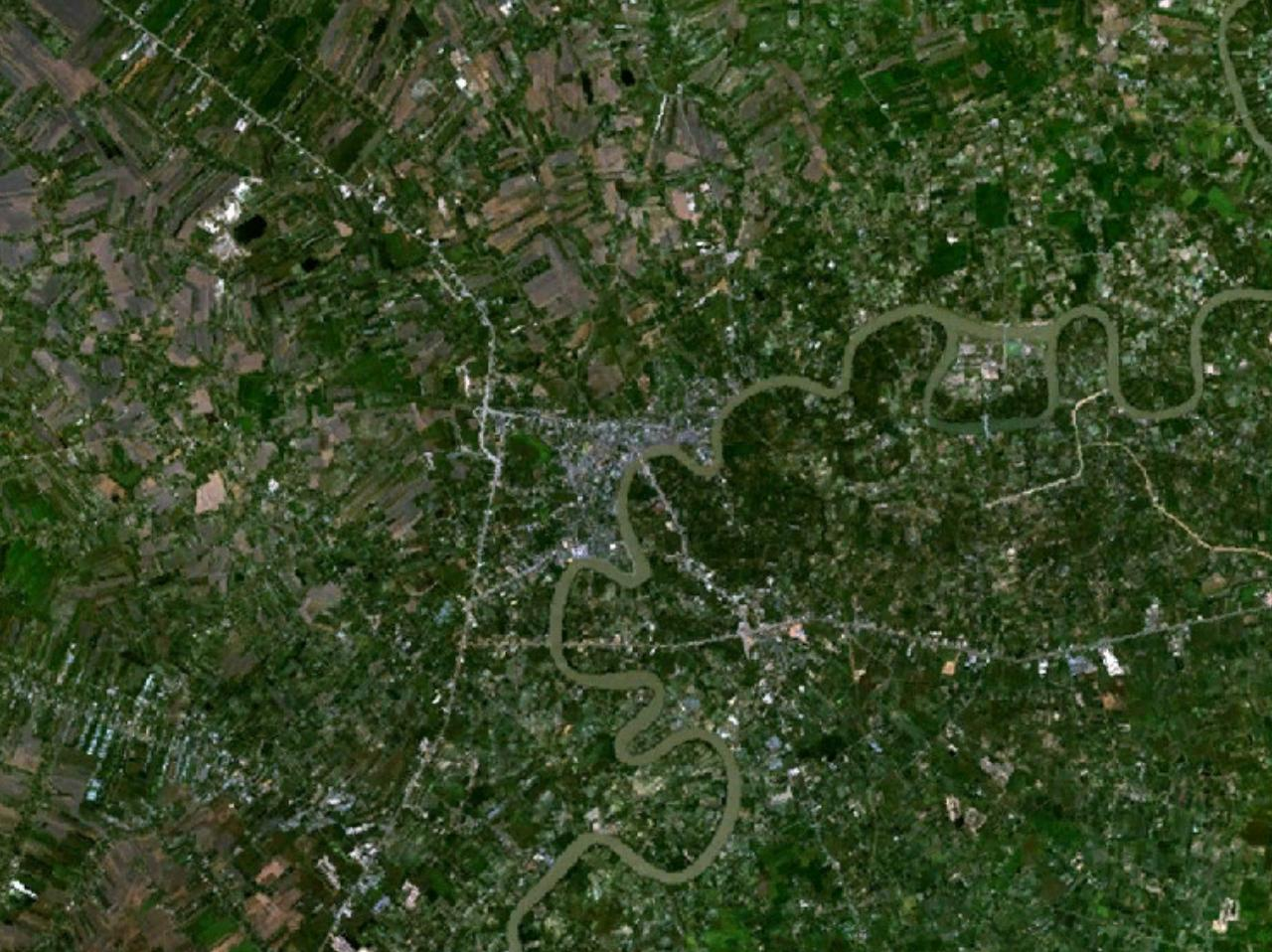
Chachoengsao province

Neighboring provinces are (from north clockwise) Prachinburi, Sa Kaeo, Chanthaburi, Chonburi, Samut Prakan, Bangkok, Pathum Thani, and Nakhon Nayok. It has a short coastline on the Gulf of Thailand.

The western part of the province is the low river plain of the Bang Pa Kong River, which is used extensively for farming rice. To the east is hillier terrain, with an average elevation of more than 100 metres. In Tha Takiap District is the Khao Ang Rue Nai Wildlife Sanctuary with an area of 674,352 rai ~ 1,078 km^{2} (416 sq mi). The total forest area in the province is 804 km^{2} (310 sq mi) or 15.5 percent of provincial area.

=== Wildlife sanctuary ===
There is one wildlife sanctuary, along with three other wildlife sanctuaries, make up region 2 (Si Racha) of Thailand's protected areas.

- Khao Ang Rue Nai Wildlife Sanctuary, 1,078 km^{2} (416 sq mi)

== Economy ==
The province has gained a reputation as a centre for recycling potentially hazardous electronic waste (e-waste), despite a June 2018 ban on imports of foreign e-waste to Thailand. China banned the import of foreign e-waste in 2018 also. Since the e-waste ban, 28 new recycling factories, most dealing with e-waste, have started in Chachoengsao province, particularly in the Ko Khanun Subdistrict of Phanom Sarakham District. In 2019, 14 businesses in Chachoengsao were granted licenses to process electronic waste, six of them in Ko Khanun. An official of the Basel Action Network, which campaigns against dumping waste in poor countries, said, "E-waste has to go somewhere, and the Chinese are simply moving their entire operations to Southeast Asia. The only way to make money is to get huge volume with cheap, illegal labour and pollute the hell out of the environment," he added.

In 2024, Thailand is actively progressing towards the establishment of a special economic zone (SEZ) in Chachoengsao province. This SEZ initiative specifically aims to advance clean energy development and support the production of electric vehicles (EVs). The SEZ, designed as an industrial estate, will attract investments in battery plants, clean energy technologies, and electricity infrastructure.

Chachoengsao province is expected to play a significant role in Thailand's growing EV industry. Domestic sales of battery electric vehicles experienced an impressive surge of 603% in 2020, driven by government subsidies provided to EV purchasers ranging from 70,000 to 150,000 THB (1,900-4,160 USD). Despite a reduction in subsidies for the current year, the trend of EV adoption is expected to continue.

The boundaries of the SEZ and investment privileges for businesses will be determined by Thailand's Policy Committee. This initiative adds to the existing special economic zones within the Eastern Economic Corridor (EEC), which encompass various sectors such as high-speed rail, digital industry, innovation, medical innovation, aviation, genomics, and digital innovation and advanced technology. The establishment of the SEZ in Chachoengsao province is anticipated to contribute significantly to Thailand's objectives of promoting clean energy, supporting the growth of the EV industry, and fostering economic development in the region.

== Symbols ==
The provincial seal shows the main hall of the Wat Sothonwararam. In this hall is the most important Buddha image of the province, known as Luangpho Phutthasothon.

The provincial tree is Peltophorum dasyrachis. The tree was assigned to the province by Queen Sirikit on the 50th anniversary of the coronation of King Rama IX in 2000. The provincial flower is the Yellow Flamboyant (Peltophorum pterocarpum). The provincial fish is the barramundi (Lates calcarifer).

The provincial slogan is "The bountiful Bang Pakong River. The sacred image of Luang Pho Sothon. Phraya Sri Sunthon, the scholar of Thai language. The rich forests of Ang Rue Nai."

== Administrative divisions ==
=== Provincial government ===
Map of eleven districts of Chachoengsao

The province is divided into 11 districts (amphoes). These are further divided into 93 subdistricts (tambons) and 859 villages (mubans).

1. Mueang Chachoengsao
2. Bang Khla
3. Bang Nam Priao
4. Bang Pakong
5. Ban Pho
6. Phanom Sarakham
7. Ratchasan
8. Sanam Chai Khet
9. Plaeng Yao
10. Tha Takiap
11. Khlong Khuean

=== Local government ===
As of 26 November 2019 there are: one Chachoengsao Provincial Administration Organisation (ongkan borihan suan changwat) and 34 municipal (thesaban) areas in the province. Chachoengsao has town (thesaban mueang) status. Further 33 subdistrict municipalities (thesaban tambon). The non-municipal areas are administered by 74 Subdistrict Administrative Organisations - SAO (ongkan borihan suan tambon).

== Health ==
Chachoengsao's main hospital is Buddhasothorn Hospital, operated by the Ministry of Public Health.

Kasemrad Chachoengsao Hospital

Ruampat Chachoengaso Hospital

Home Hospital Chachoengsao

== Education ==
=== Universities ===
- Rajabhat Rajanagarindra University (Public)
- Chalermkanchana University (Private)

=== Schools ===
- Benchamaracharungsarit School
- Saint Louis School (Chachoengsao)
- Datdaruni School
- Pracharuek Sombun School

== Transport ==
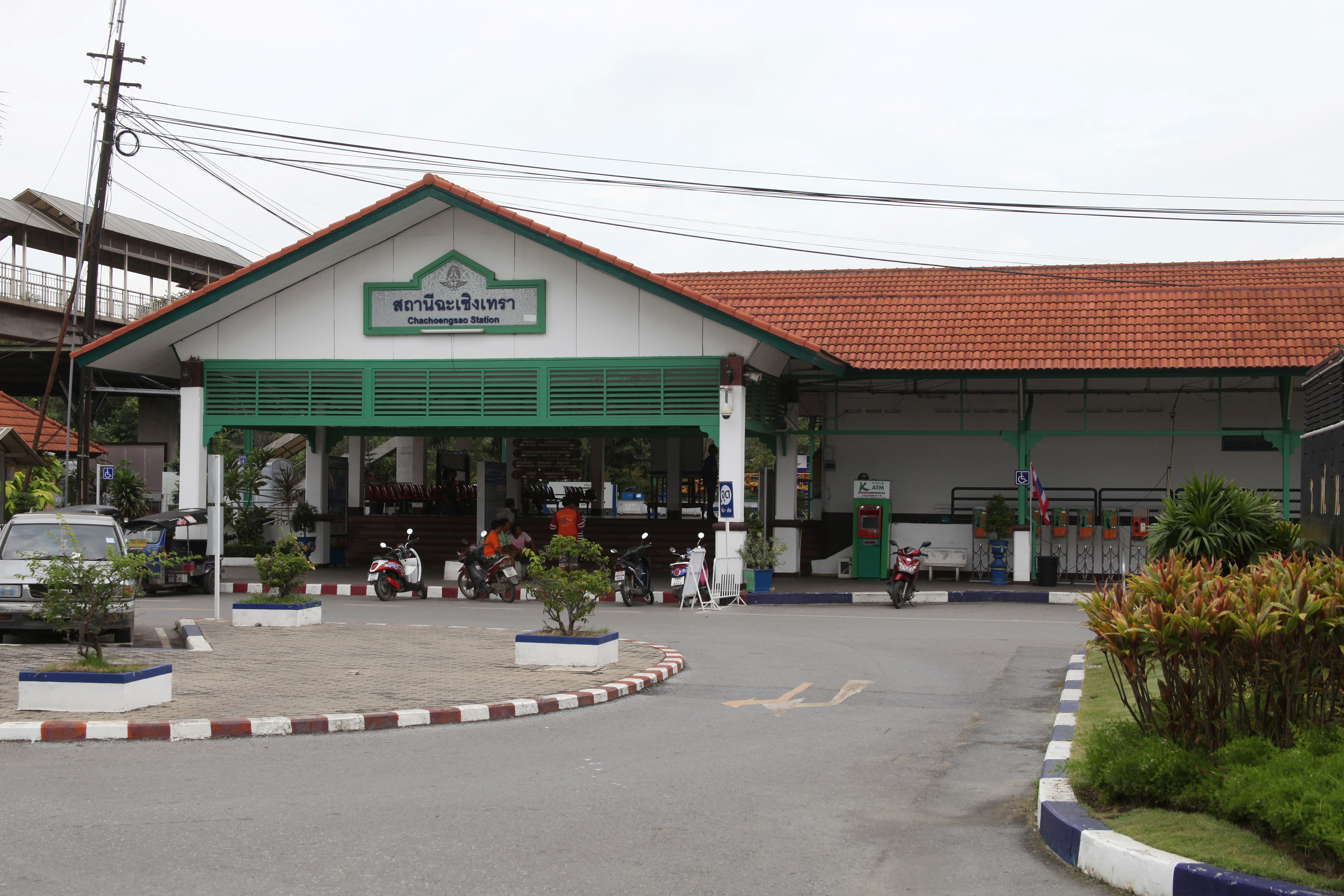
Chachoengsao railway station

Chachoengsao's main rail stop is Chachoengsao Junction railway station.

== Religion ==
Religion in Chachoengsao
1. Buddhism (92.7%)
2. Islam (6.48%)
3. Christianity (0.67%)
4. Confucianism, Sikhism, and others (0.05%)
5. Hinduism (0.03%)

== Human achievement index 2022 ==
Health	Education	Employment	Income
17	21	9	1
Housing	Family	Transport	Participation
66	39	66	36
province Chachoengsao, with an HAI 2022 value of 0.6676 is "high", occupies place 8 in the ranking.

Since 2003, the United Nations Development Programme (UNDP) in Thailand has tracked progress on human development at the sub-national level using the Human achievement index (HAI), a composite index covering eight key areas of human development. The National Economic and Social Development Board (NESDB) has taken over this task since 2017.

Rank	Classification
1–13	"High"
14–29	"Somewhat high"
30–45	"Average"
46–61	"Somewhat low"
62–77	"Low"

Map with provinces and HAI 2022 rankings
