= Mae Charim National Park =

National park in Thailand

- อุทยานแห่งชาติแม่จริม
- IUCN category II (national park)
- Location within Thailand
- Location: Thailand
- Nearest city: Nan
- Coordinates: 18°36′N 100°58′E
- Area: 432 km^{2} (167 sq mi)
- Established: 2007
- Visitors: 10,086 (in 2019)
- Governing body: Department of National Park, Wildlife and Plant Conservation

Mae Charim National Park (Thai: อุทยานแห่งชาติแม่จริม), also known as Mae Jarim, is a protected area in the Luang Prabang Range, Nan Province, Northern Thailand. The Wa River, a popular river for white water rafting between July and December, flows through the park area. The park was established on 6 July 2007 with an area of 270,000 rai ~ 432 square kilometres (167 sq mi). Mae Charim National Park is part of the Luang Prabang montane rain forests ecoregion.

1,652 m high Doi Khun Lan is the highest peak within the park perimeter. There are said to be yetis in the area.

== Location ==
Mae Charim National Park in overview PARO 13 (Phrae)

5) Mae Charim National Park in overview PARO 13 (Phrae)

	National park
1	Doi Pha Klong
2	Doi Phu Kha
3	Khun Nan
4	Khun Sathan
5	Mae Charim
6	Mae Yom
7	Nanthaburi
8	Si Nan
9	Tham Sakoen
10	Wiang Kosai

	Wildlife sanctuary
11	Doi Luang
12	Lam Nam Nan Fang Khwa
	Non-hunting area
13	Chang Pha Dan
14	Phu Fa

	Forest park
15	Doi Mon Kaeo–Mon Deng
16	Pha Lak Muen
17	Phae Mueang Phi
18	Tham Pha Tub

== See also ==
- Thai highlands
- List of national parks of Thailand
- DNP - Mae Charim National Park
- List of Protected Areas Regional Offices of Thailand
