= Khun Nan National Park =

- อุทยานแห่งชาติขุนน่าน
- IUCN category II (national park)
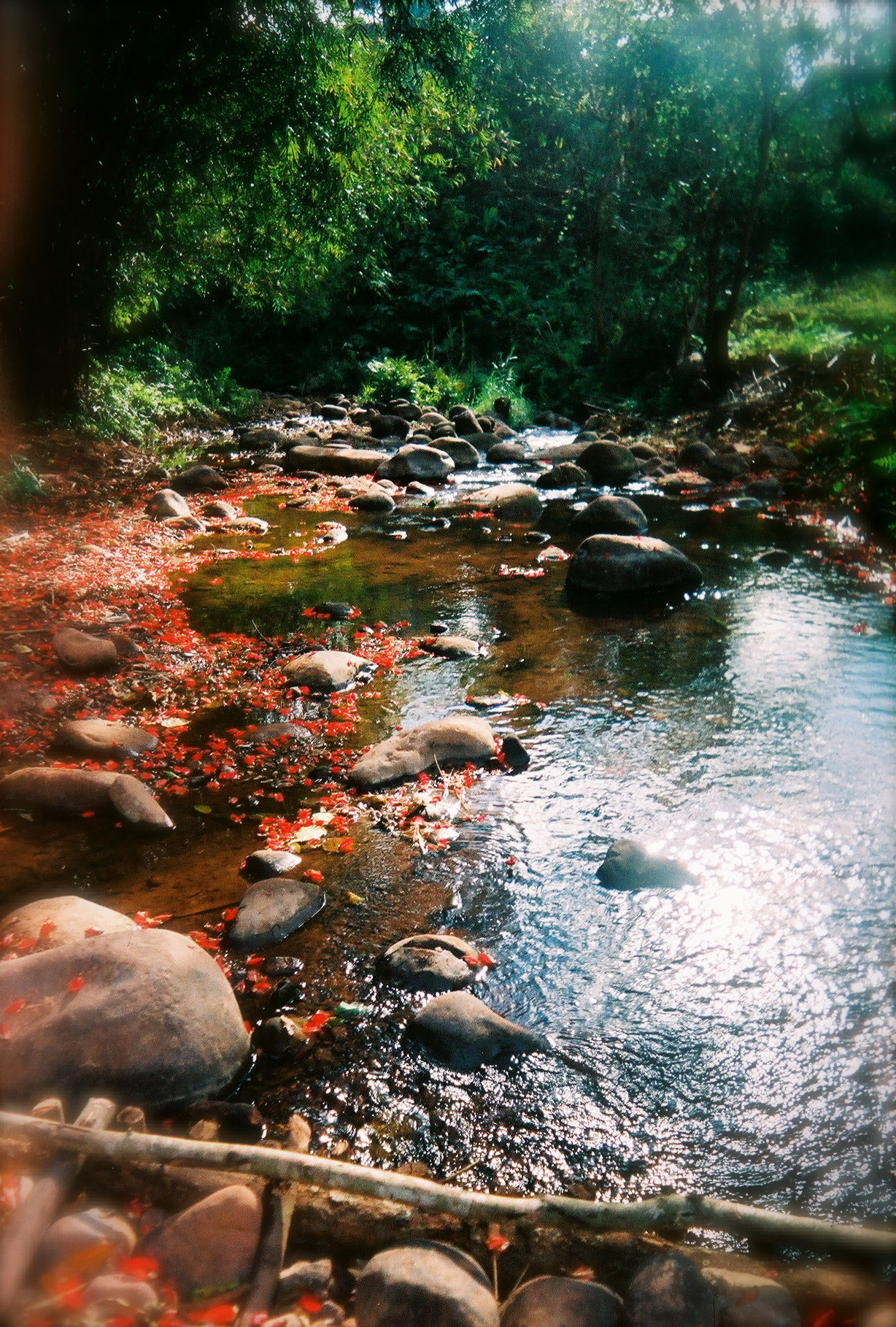
- A stream inside the park

- Location within Thailand
- Location: Thailand
- Nearest city: Nan
- Coordinates: 19°10′59″N 101°10′39″E
- Area: 249 km^{2} (96 sq mi)
- Established: 2009
- Visitors: 2,645 (in 2019)
- Governing body: Department of National Park, Wildlife and Plant Conservation

Khun Nan National Park (Thai: อุทยานแห่งชาติขุนน่าน) is a protected area on the western side of the Luang Prabang Range in the Thailand-Laos border area, on the Thai side of the ridge. It is named after Khun Nan subdistrict (tambon) of Chaloem Phra Kiat District of Nan Province and includes parts located in Bo Kluea District. The park is located north of the Doi Phu Kha National Park and was established in 2009 with an area of 153,982 rai ~ 249 square kilometres (96 sq mi).

Khun Nan National Park is part of the Luang Prabang montane rain forests ecoregion. Sapan Waterfall, located near the Lao border, is the most important waterfall in the park; Huai Ha waterfall runs throughout the year. Other waterfalls within the perimeter of the park are Huai Ti and Ban Den. 1,745 m high Doi Phi Pan Nam is the tallest peak within the park. The Wa River has its sources in the mountains of the park and flows through it.

== Location ==
Khun Nan National Park in overview PARO 13 (Phrae)

3) Khun Nan National Park in overview PARO 13 (Phrae)

	National park
1	Doi Pha Klong
2	Doi Phu Kha
3	Khun Nan
4	Khun Sathan
5	Mae Charim
6	Mae Yom
7	Nanthaburi
8	Si Nan
9	Tham Sakoen
10	Wiang Kosai

	Wildlife sanctuary
11	Doi Luang
12	Lam Nam Nan Fang Khwa
	Non-hunting area
13	Chang Pha Dan
14	Phu Fa

	Forest park
15	Doi Mon Kaeo–Mon Deng
16	Pha Lak Muen
17	Phae Mueang Phi
18	Tham Pha Tub

== See also ==
- Thai highlands
- List of national parks of Thailand
- DNP - Khun Nan National Park
- List of Protected Areas Regional Offices of Thailand
