= Mae Yom National Park =

National park of Thailand

Mae Yom National Park อุทยานแห่งชาติแม่ยม
- IUCN category II (national park)
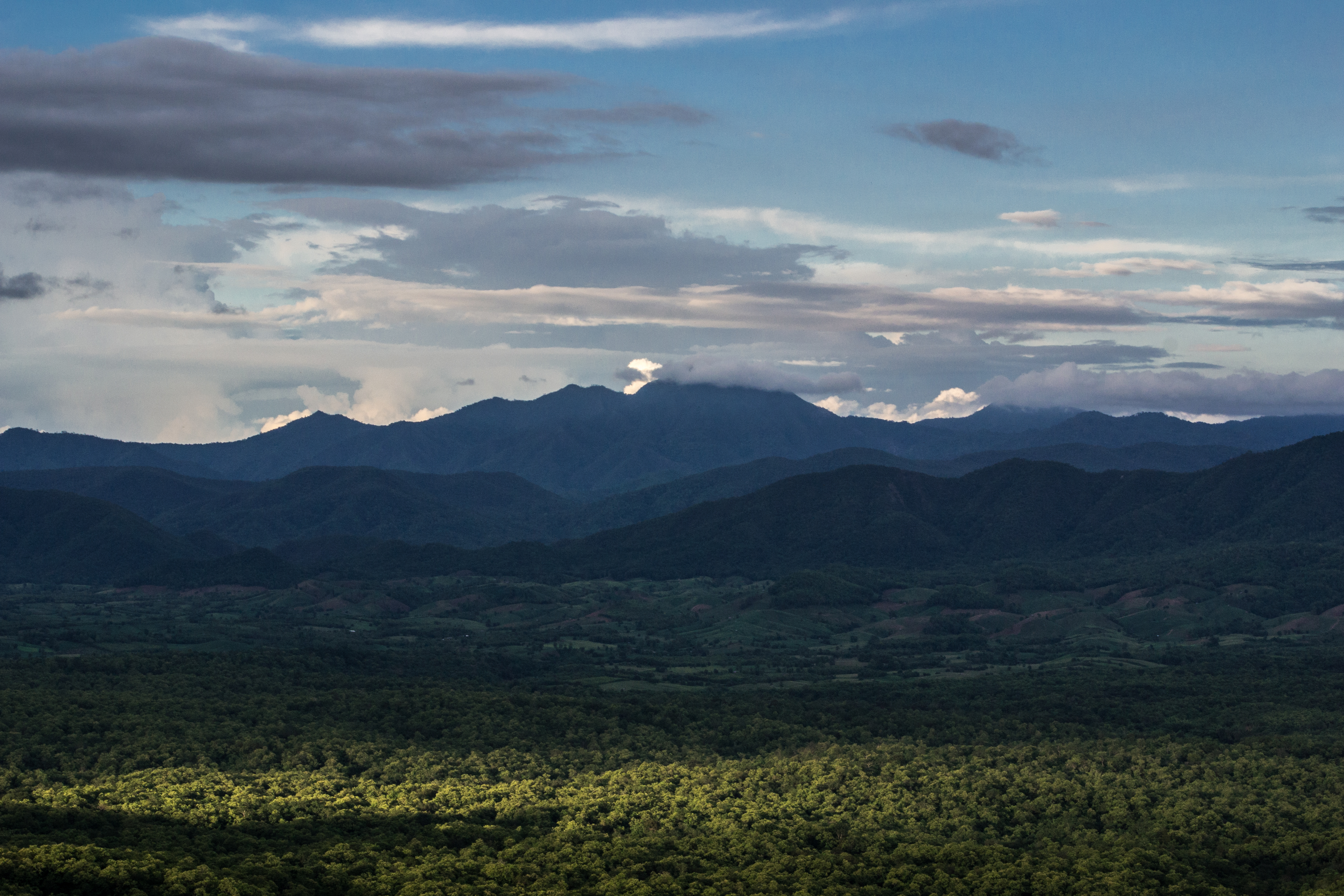
- From Kaeng Suea Ten viewpoint

- Location within Thailand
- Location: Phrae Province, Thailand
- Coordinates: 18°44′45″N 100°11′45″E
- Area: 455 km^{2} (176 sq mi)
- Established: 1 March 1986
- Visitors: 6,738 (in 2019)
- Governing body: Department of National Park, Wildlife and Plant Conservation

Mae Yom National Park is a national park in Phrae Province, Thailand. The Yom River flows through the park. The land is mountainous and fertile, and there are naturally grown teak trees.

== Flora ==
The park is in the mountains of the Phi Pan Nam Range. It includes sections of moist evergreen forest, hill evergreen forest, mixed deciduous forest, and teak forest.

The site of the controversial Kaeng Suea Ten Dam on the Yom River, a dam that would destroy large areas of forest, is close to the southern edge of the park area.

== Fauna ==
The park, with an area of 284,218 rai ~ 455 square kilometres (176 sq mi) is home to elephant, barking deer, Sumatran Serow, black bear, Wild Boar and hare species.

== Attractions ==
- Dong Sak Ngam
- Kaeng Sua Ten
- Lom Dong

== Facilities ==
The park offers accommodations. There is also a visitor center and a grocery store.

== Location ==
Mae Yom National Park in overview PARO 13 (Phrae)

6) Mae Yom National Park in overview PARO 13 (Phrae)

	National park
1	Doi Pha Klong
2	Doi Phu Kha
3	Khun Nan
4	Khun Sathan
5	Mae Charim
6	Mae Yom
7	Nanthaburi
8	Si Nan
9	Tham Sakoen
10	Wiang Kosai

	Wildlife sanctuary
11	Doi Luang
12	Lam Nam Nan Fang Khwa
	Non-hunting area
13	Chang Pha Dan
14	Phu Fa

	Forest park
15	Doi Mon Kaeo–Mon Deng
16	Pha Lak Muen
17	Phae Mueang Phi
18	Tham Pha Tub

== See also ==
- List of national parks of Thailand
- DNP - Mae Yom National Park
- List of Protected Areas Regional Offices of Thailand
