= Northern Thailand–Laos moist deciduous forests =

Ecoregion in Northern Thailand and Laos

Ecoregion: Northern Thailand–Laos moist deciduous forests
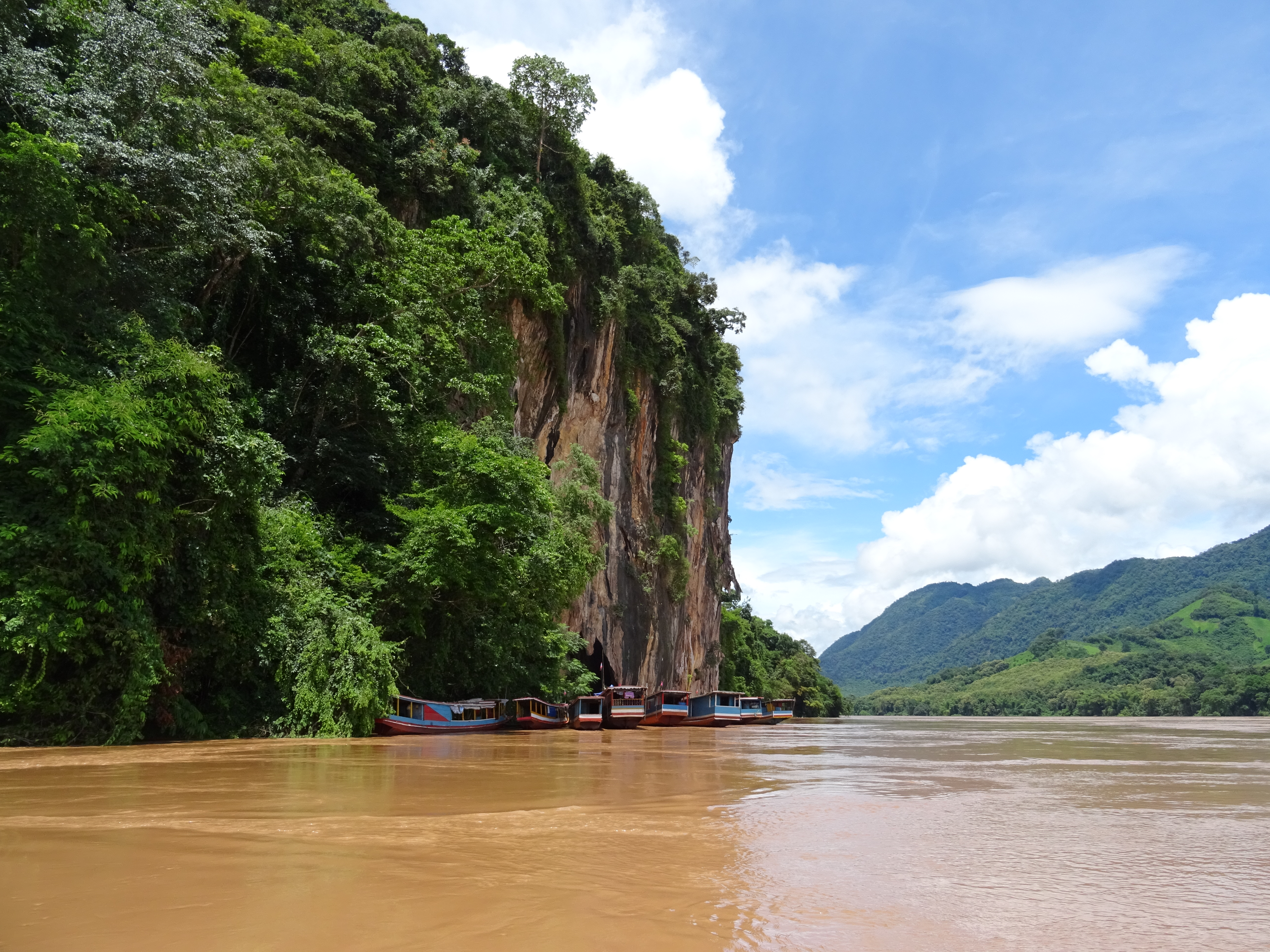
- Mekong River and Pak Ou Caves in Laos

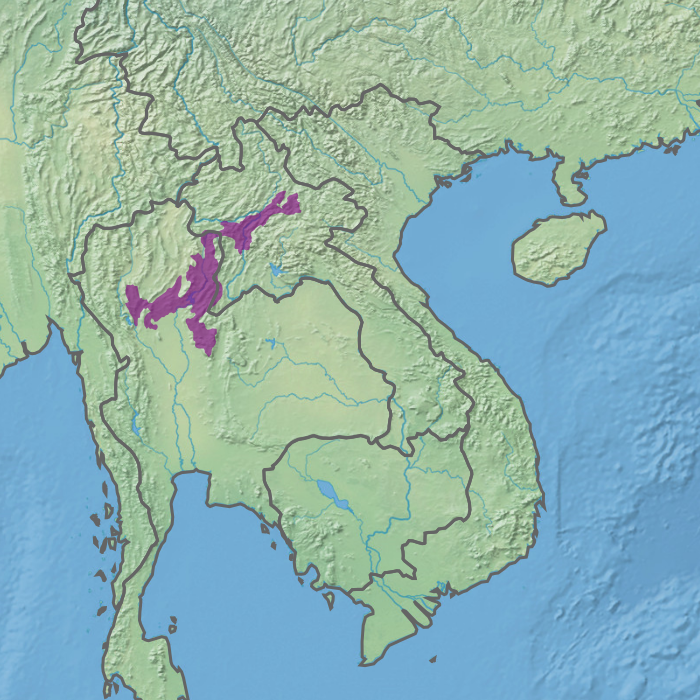
- Ecoregion territory (in purple)

Ecology
- Realm: Indomalayan
- Biome: Tropical and subtropical moist broadleaf forests

Geography
- Area: 29,526 km^{2} (11,400 sq mi)
- Country: Thailand, Laos
- Coordinates: 18.75°N 100.75°E

The Northern Thailand–Laos moist deciduous forests ecoregion (WWF ID:IM0139) follows the upper course of the Nan River in northern Thailand and the Mekong River in Laos. This area has the highest proportion of tree cover in Thailand, with many forests dominated by Teak (Tectona grandis). The river valleys have been under pressure from human use: agriculture, teak plantations, and hunting have reduce plant and animal presence.

== Location and description ==
The valleys in northern Thailand run north–south between a series a mountain ranges; this ecoregion's middle section covers the easternmost of these. The extensions to the west follow a west–east bend in the mountains, and the extension in the north follows the west–east course of the Mekong River in Laos. The valley floors are at 200–400 meters above sea level, and the transition to a montane ecosystem occurs around 800–1,000 meters. the highest point in the ecoregion is 1,606 metres (5,269 ft). The long, thin ridges of the ecoregion form a transition zone between the Luang Prabang montane rain forests to the south, the Northern Indochina subtropical forests to the north, and the Central Indochina dry forests to the west.

== Climate ==
The climate of the ecoregion is Tropical savanna climate - dry winter (Köppen climate classification (Aw)). This climate is characterized by relatively even temperatures throughout the year, and a pronounced dry season. The driest month has less than 60 mm of precipitation, and is drier than the average month. Mean annual precipitation in the region is 1,000-1,200 mm.

== Flora and fauna ==
About 75% of the region is closed forest, a mixture of deciduous broadleaf and evergreen types on the steep slopes. Another 10% is open forest. The forest has been degraded by human pressures, with selective logging taking much of the largest trees. The flat river valleys are mostly under cultivation. A study of a representative area of forest in Mae Yom National Park recorded 27% of the trees as Teak (Tectona grandis), 11% as Mai daeng (Xylia xylocarpa), 10% as Burma padauk (Pterocarpus macrocarpus), and 7% as Millettia (Millettia brandisiana). Bamboo is common in disturbed areas. Large mammals had been mostly eliminated in the wild by the early 1970s, and riverine habitats were disturbed by the construction of the Bhumibol Dam in the 1960s. Still, the ecoregion has one of the highest forest coverage rates in Southeast Asia, and the protected areas may support rare species.

== Protected areas ==
Officially protected areas cover about 20% of the ecoregion, and include:

- Mae Yom National Park, a mountainous area of the eastern Phi Pan Nam Range in northern Thailand.
- Si Satchanalai National Park, at the far western edge of the ecoregion.
- Thung Salaeng Luang National Park, in the middle section of the region in Thailand, on the Wang Thong River.
- Wiang Kosai National Park, in the west of the region, home to the Mae Koeng Waterfalls.
- Nam Et-Phou Louey National Park is in Laos at the eastern end of the ecoregion.

== See also ==
- List of trees of northern Thailand
