= Phi Pan Nam (disambiguation) =

Phi Pan Nam may refer to:

- Phi Pan Nam Range, a mountain range in Thailand
- Doi Phi Pan Nam, a 1,950 m mountain of the Luang Prabang Range located in the Thai-Lao border area
- Another name for Phu Khe, a 2,079 m mountain of the Luang Prabang Range, also located in the Thai-Lao border area
