= Si Nan National Park =

National park in Thailand

- อุทยานแห่งชาติศรีน่าน
- IUCN category II (national park)
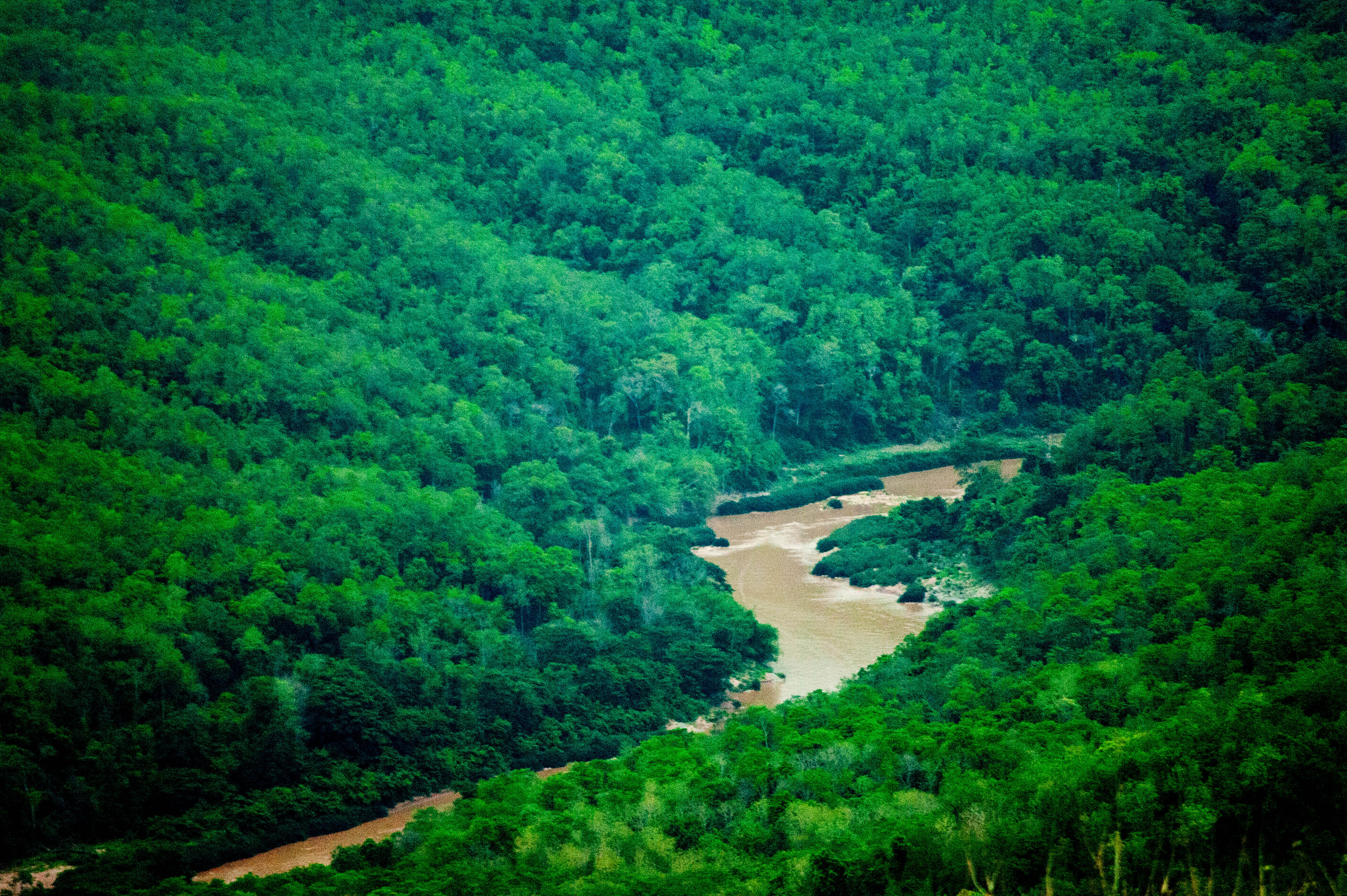

- Location within Thailand
- Location: Thailand
- Nearest city: Nan
- Coordinates: 18°22′4″N 100°50′15″E
- Area: 1,024 km^{2} (395 sq mi)
- Established: 25 May 2007
- Visitors: 115,358 (in 2019)
- Governing body: Department of National Parks, Wildlife and Plant Conservation

Si Nan National Park (Thai: อุทยานแห่งชาติศรีน่าน) is a national park in Thailand's Nan Province. This mountainous park is home to steep cliffs and a long section of the Nan River. It was established on May 25, 2007.

== Geography ==
Si Nan National Park is about 80 kilometres (50 mi) south of the town of Nan in the Wiang Sa, Na Noi, and Na Muen districts of Nan Province. The park's area is 640,237 rai ~ 1,024 square kilometres (395 sq mi). The park's highest point is the Khao Khun Huai Huek peak at 1,234 metres (4,049 ft). The Nan River flows for about 60 kilometres (40 mi) through the park.

== Attractions ==
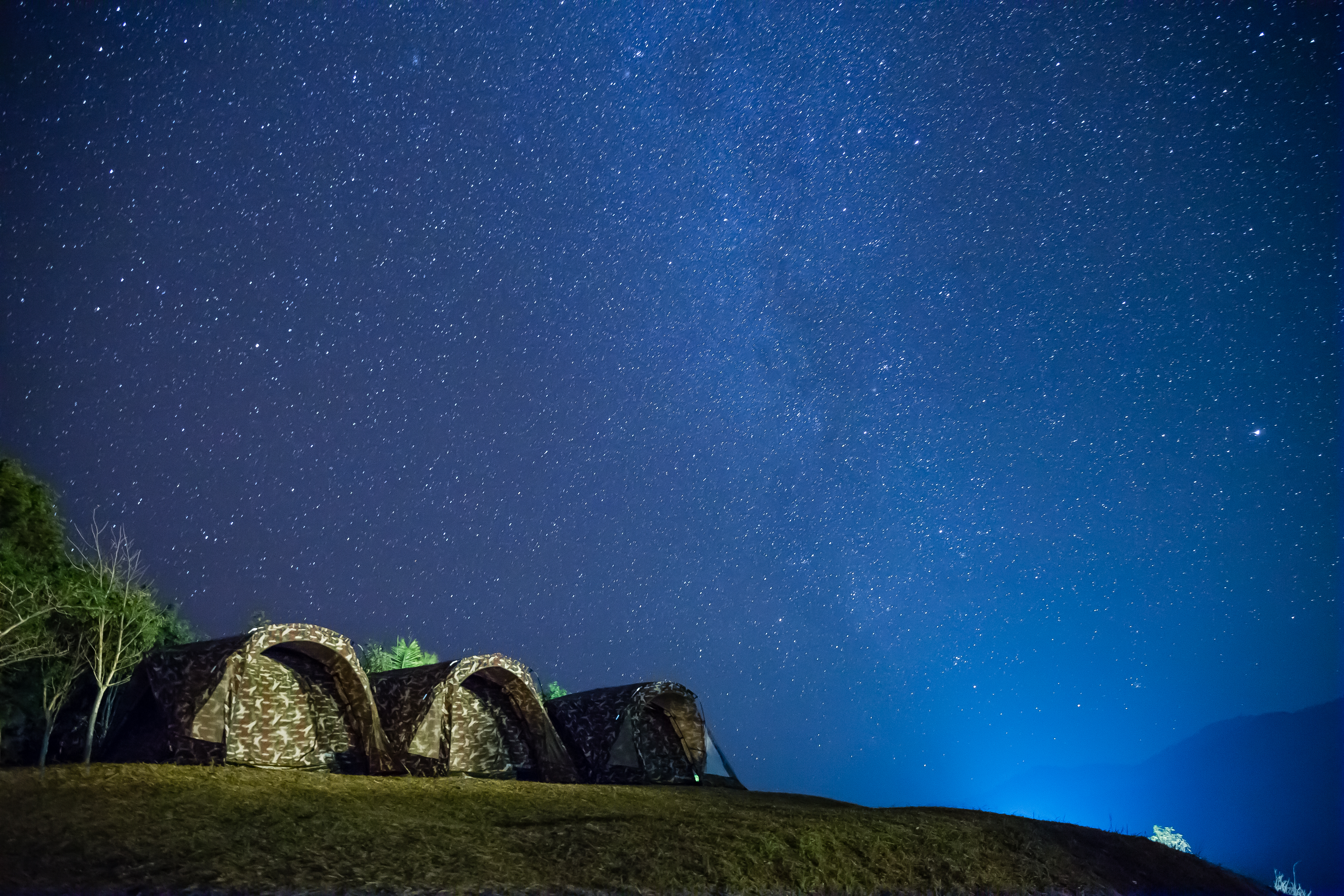
Night sky at Doi Samer Dow

Pha Chu, Pha Hua Sing, and Doi Samer Dao offer scenic views of the park's mountainous terrain. Kaeng Luang is a popular rafting spot along the Nan River.

== Flora and fauna ==
The park features forest types including deciduous and mixed. Tree species include Irvingia malayana, krabak, Malabar ironwood, makha, Xylia xylocarpa, Dalbergia oliveri and Vitex pinnata.

Park animals, some of which are endangered species, include tiger, leopard, fishing cat, wild boar, mouse deer, masked palm civet, Asiatic wild dog (dhole) and treeshrew.

== Location ==
Si Nan National Park in overview PARO 13 (Phrae)

8) Si Nan National Park in overview PARO 13 (Phrae)

	National park
1	Doi Pha Klong
2	Doi Phu Kha
3	Khun Nan
4	Khun Sathan
5	Mae Charim
6	Mae Yom
7	Nanthaburi
8	Si Nan
9	Tham Sakoen
10	Wiang Kosai

	Wildlife sanctuary
11	Doi Luang
12	Lam Nam Nan Fang Khwa
	Non-hunting area
13	Chang Pha Dan
14	Phu Fa

	Forest park
15	Doi Mon Kaeo–Mon Deng
16	Pha Lak Muen
17	Phae Mueang Phi
18	Tham Pha Tub

== See also ==
- List of national parks of Thailand
- DNP - Si Nan National Park
- List of Protected Areas Regional Offices of Thailand
