= Doi Phu Kha National Park =

Natural area in Northern Thailand

- อุทยานแห่งชาติดอยภูคา
- IUCN category II (national park)
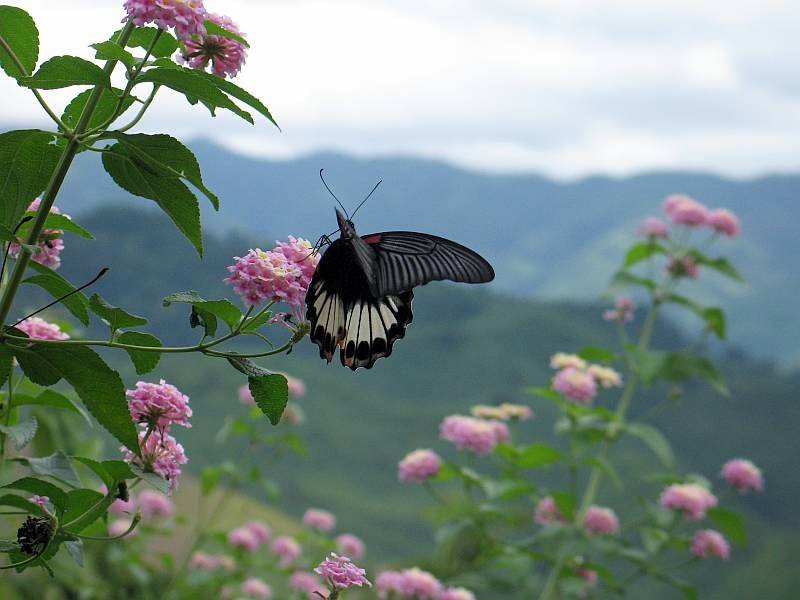

- Location within Thailand
- Location: Nan Province, Thailand
- Nearest city: Nan
- Coordinates: 19°12′2″N 101°4′5″E
- Area: 1,704 km^{2} (658 sq mi)
- Established: June 17, 1999
- Visitors: 63,102 (in 2019)
- Governing body: Department of National Park, Wildlife and Plant Conservation

Doi Phu Kha National Park (Thai: อุทยานแห่งชาติดอยภูคา) covers parts of 8 districts in the Luang Prabang Range, Nan Province, Northern Thailand and has rich natural resources. It is Northern Thailand's largest National park and rivers such as Nan River and Pua River, have their sources within the area of the range under the protection of the park limits. Khun Nan National Park is located north of the park area.

1,980 m high Doi Phu Kha, located within the parks perimeter, gives its name to the park. There are many caves in the park area. The park is named after chomphu phu kha (Thai: ชมพูภูคา Bretschneidera sinensis), a tree with attractive pink flower bunches, which together with Caryota gigas and Acer wilsonii, are rare species of plant which in Thailand can be found only in this park. There are natural rock formations on 1,837 m high Doi Phu Wae peak. The ascent takes 3 days and 2 nights. The scenery of the sea of mist and the mountain range is the reward for the trekkers who can reach Phu Wae peak.

The park was established on June 17, 1999 with an area of 1,065,000 rai ~ 1,704 square kilometres (658 sq mi). Doi Phu Kha National Park is part of the Luang Prabang montane rain forests ecoregion.

King Bhumibol Adulyadej has blamed the destruction of Thailand's forested areas on the greed of some state officials. This is evident in large zones of Doi Phu Kha National Park that were formerly covered with virgin forest and that have been deforested even while having national park status.

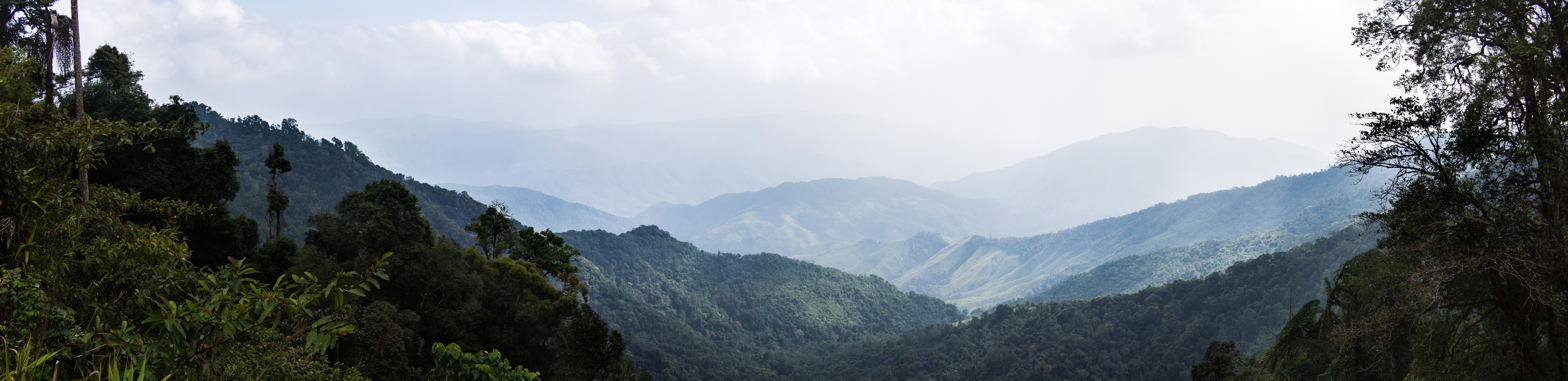
A panoramic image of the mountains on the south-side of the park

== Location ==
Doi Phu Kha National Park in overview PARO 13 (Phrae)

2) Doi Phu Kha National Park in overview PARO 13 (Phrae)

	National park
1	Doi Pha Klong
2	Doi Phu Kha
3	Khun Nan
4	Khun Sathan
5	Mae Charim
6	Mae Yom
7	Nanthaburi
8	Si Nan
9	Tham Sakoen
10	Wiang Kosai

	Wildlife sanctuary
11	Doi Luang
12	Lam Nam Nan Fang Khwa
	Non-hunting area
13	Chang Pha Dan
14	Phu Fa

	Forest park
15	Doi Mon Kaeo–Mon Deng
16	Pha Lak Muen
17	Phae Mueang Phi
18	Tham Pha Tub

== See also ==
- Thai highlands
- List of national parks in Thailand
- DNP - Doi Phu Kha National Park
- List of Protected Areas Regional Offices of Thailand
