= List of Protected Areas Regional Offices of Thailand =

Since the beginning a century ago, forest management in Thailand has undergone many changes, in form of reclassifications, name changes and management changes. All this has resulted in a division of 16 regions with 5 branches in 2002. Five regions in Central-East with 28 national parks, four regions in the South with 39 national parks, four regions in the Northeast with 23 national parks and eight regions in the North with 65 national parks.

== History ==
Royal Forest Department was reclassified from the Ministry of Interior to the Ministry of Kasettrathikarn in 1921. A 1932 revision by Royal Forest Department divided the forests in Thailand into 17 regions. An improvement in 1940 divided the forests in Thailand into 11 regions. A further improvement in 1952 was intended to establish 21 districts across the country, called "Forest Districts".
A Royal Decree, no.119, issue 99kor, dated 2 October 2002 stated: Under the Ministry of Natural Resources and Environment, Royal Forest Department remains responsible for economic forestry work and a new Department of National Parks, Wildlife and Plant Conservation is further established, which is divided into 16 regions with 5 branches for the conservation, promotion and restoration of natural resources, wildlife and plant species in forest areas.

== Central-East ==
As of 2022 the central and east of Thailand is divided into five regions with 28 national parks.

Regional offices	National parks	Responsible for provinces
PARO 1 (Prachinburi)	4	Prachinburi, Nakhon Nayok, Sa Kaeo and Buriram
PARO 1 (Saraburi branch)	2	Lopburi and Saraburi
PARO 2 (Si Racha)	7	Chonburi, Chachoengsao, Rayong, Chanthaburi and Trat
PARO 3 (Ban Pong)	9	Kanchanaburi, Ratchaburi, Samut Sakhon and Suphan Buri
PARO 3 (Phetchaburi branch)	6	Phetchaburi and Prachuap Khiri Khan

Map of Central-East Thailand - PARO 1-3

=== Protected Areas Regional Office 1 (Prachinburi) ===
==== Management overview PARO 1 (Prachinburi) ====
	National park
1	Khao Yai
2	Pang Sida
3	Ta Phraya
4	Thap Lan

Management overview PARO 1 (Prachinburi)

==== Visitors to 4 national parks (2019) of PARO 1 (Prachinburi) ====
The total number of visitors to 4 national parks in 2019 is 1,669,000.
Khao Yai has the largest number of visitors with 1,551,000 (93%).
The next two national parks, with resp 58,000 and 57,000 visitors, have a total of 115,000 visitors (7%).
Ta Phraya only has 3,000 visitors (0.2%).

=== Protected Areas Regional Office 1 (Saraburi branch) ===
==== Management overview PARO 1 (Saraburi branch) ====
	National park
1	Namtok Chet Sao Noi
2	Namtok Sam Lan
	Wildlife sanctuary
3	Sap Langka

	Non-hunting area
4	Kaeng Khoi
5	Khao Erawan
6	Khao Somphot
7	Khao Wong Chan Daeng
8	Khuean Pasak Jolasid
9	Wat Phai Lom–Wat Amphu Wararam
10	Wat Tan En

	Botanical garden
11	Phu Kae

Management overview PARO 1 (Saraburi branch)

==== Visitors to 2 national parks (2019) of PARO 1 (Saraburi branch) ====
The total number of visitors to 2 national parks in 2019 is 435,000.
Namtok Chat Sao Noi has the largest number of visitors with 389,000 (90%).
Namtok Sam Lan has 46,000 visitors (10%).

=== Protected Areas Regional Office 2 (Si Racha) ===
==== Management overview PARO 2 (Si Racha) ====
	National park
1	Khao Chamao–Khao Wong
2	Khao Khitchakut
3	Khao Laem Ya–Mu Ko Samet
4	Khao Sip Ha Chan
5	Namtok Khlong Kaeo
6	Mu Ko Chang
7	Namtok Phlio

	Wildlife sanctuary
8	Khao Ang Rue Nai
9	Khao Khio– Khao Chomphu
10	Khao Soi Dao
11	Khlong Kruea Wai

	Non-hunting area
12	Bang Phra Reservoir
13	Khao Chi On
14	Khung Kraben
	Forest park
15	Khao Laem Sing
16	Namtok Khao Chao Bo Thong

Management overview PARO 2 (Si Racha)

==== Visitors to 7 national parks (2019) of PARO 2 (Si Racha) ====
The total number of visitors to 7 national parks in 2019 is 3,975,000.
Khao Laem Ya–Mu Ko Samet has the largest number of visitors with 1,620,000 (41%).
Khao Khitchakut has 1,180,000 visitors (30%).
Namtok Phlio has 671,000 visitors (17%).
The next two national parks with 218,000 to 250,000 individually, have a total of 468,000 visitors (11%).
The last two national parks with 10,000 to 26,000 individually, have a total of just 36,000 visitors (1%).

=== Protected Areas Regional Office 3 (Ban Pong) ===
==== Management overview PARO 3 (Ban Pong) ====
	National park
1	Thai Prachan
2	Chaloem Rattanakosin
3	Erawan
4	Khao Laem
5	Khuean Srinagarindra
6	Lam Khlong Ngu
7	Phu Toei
8	Sai Yok
9	Thong Pha Phum

	Wildlife sanctuary
10	Mae Nam Phachi
11	Salak Phra
12	Thung Yai Naresuan West
	Forest park
22	Phra Thaen Dong Rang
23	Phu Muang
24	Tham Khao Noi

	Non-hunting area
13	Bueng Kroengkawia– Nong Sam Sap
14	Bueng Chawak
15	Khao Pratap Chang
16	Phantai Norasing
17	Somdet Phra Srinagarindra
18	Tham Khang Khao– Khao Chong Phran
19	Tham Lawa– Tham Daowadueng
20	Wat Rat Sattha Kayaram
21	Wat Tham Rakhang– Khao Phra Non

Management overview PARO 3 (Ban Pong)

==== Visitors to 9 national parks (2019) of PARO 3 (Ban Pong) ====
The total number of visitors to 9 national parks in 2019 is 1,211,000.
Erawan national park has the largest number of visitors with 651,000 (54%).
The next three national parks with 112,000 to 145,000 individually, have a total of 374,000 visitors (31%).
The next two national parks with 66,000 and 75,000 individually, have a total of 141,000 visitors (11%).
The last three national parks with 4,000 to 32,000 individually, have a total of just 45,000 visitors (4%).

=== Protected Areas Regional Office 3 (Phetchaburi branch) ===
==== Management overview PARO 3 (Phetchaburi branch) ====
	National park
1	Ao Siam
2	Hat Wanakon
3	Kaeng Krachan
4	Khao Sam Roi Yot
5	Kui Buri
6	Namtok Huai Yang

	Wildlife sanctuary
7	Prince Chumphon North Park (upper)
	Non-hunting area
8	Cha-am
9	Khao Chaiyarat
10	Khao Krapuk– Khao Tao Mo

	Forest park
11	Cha-am
12	Huai Nam Sap
13	Khao Nang Phanthurat
14	Khao Ta Mong Lai
15	Klang Ao
16	Mae Ramphueng
17	Pran Buri
18	Thao Kosa

Management overview PARO 3 (Phetchaburi branch)

==== Visitors to 6 national parks (2019) of PARO 3 (Phetchaburi branch) ====
The total number of visitors to 6 national parks in 2019 is 379,000.
Khao Sam Roi Yot national park has the largest number of visitors with 165,000 (44%).
Kaen Krachan national park has 104,000 visitors (27%).
The last four national parks with 19,000 to 43,000 visitors individually, have a total of 110,000 visitors (29%).

== South ==
As of 2022 the south of Thailand is divided into four regions with 39 national parks.

Regional offices	National parks	Responsible for provinces
PARO 4 (Surat Thani)	11	Chumphon, Ranong and Surat Thani
PARO 5 (Nakhon Si Thammarat)	20	Krabi, Phang Nga, Phuket and Satun
PARO 6 (Songkhla)	3	Phatthalung, Songkhla and Trang
PARO 6 (Pattani branch)	5	Narathiwat, Pattani and Yala

=== Protected Areas Regional Office 4 (Surat Thani) ===
==== Management overview PARO 4 (Surat Thani) ====
	National park
1	Kaeng Krung
2	Khao Sok
3	Khlong Phanom
4	Laem Son
5	Lam Nam Kra Buri
6	Mu Ko Ang Thong
7	Mu Ko Chumphon
8	Mu Ko Ranong
9	Namtok Ngao
10	Tai Rom Yen
11	Than Sadet–Ko Pha-ngan

	Wildlife sanctuary
12	Khuan Mae Yai Mon
13	Khlong Nakha
14	Khlong Saeng
15	Khlong Yan
16	Prince Chumphon; North Park (lower)
17	Prince Chumphon; South Park
18	Thung Raya Na-Sak

	Non-hunting area
19	Khao Tha Phet
20	Nong Thung Thong
	Forest park
21	Namtok Kapo

Management overview PARO 4 (Surat Thani)

==== Visitors to 11 national parks (2019) of PARO 4 (Surat Thani) ====
The total number of visitors to 11 national parks in 2019 is 953,000.
Khao Sok national park has the largest number of visitors with 419,000 (44%).
The next three national parks with 126,000 to 158,000 individually, have a total of 418,000 visitors (44%).
The next four national parks with 14,000 and 53,000 individually, have a total of 113,000 visitors (12%).
The last three national parks with 500 to 2,000 individually, have a total of just 3,000 visitors (0.3%).

=== Protected Areas Regional Office 5 (Nakhon Si Thammarat) ===
==== Management overview PARO 5 (Nakhon Si Thammarat) ====
	National park
1	Ao Phang Nga
2	Hat Chao Mai
3	Hat Khanom–Mu Ko Thale Tai
4	Hat Noppharat Thara– Mu Ko Phi Phi
5	Khao Lak–Lam Ru
6	Khao Lampi–Hat Thai Mueang
7	Khao Luang
8	Khao Nan
9	Khao Phanom Bencha
10	Mu Ko Lanta
11	Mu Ko Phetra
12	Mu Ko Similan
13	Mu Ko Surin
14	Namtok Si Khit
15	Namtok Yong
16	Si Phang Nga
17	Sirinat
18	Tarutao
19	Thale Ban
20	Than Bok Khorani

	Wildlife sanctuary
21	Kathun
22	Khao Pra–Bang Khram
23	Khlong Phraya
24	Namtok Song Phraek

	Non-hunting area
25	Bo Lo
26	Khao Nam Phrai
27	Khao Phra Thaeo
28	Khao Pra–Bang Khram
29	Khlong Lam Chan
30	Laem Talumpuk
31	Ko Libong
32	Nong Plak Phraya– Khao Raya Bangsa
33	Thung Thale
	Forest park
34	Bo Namrong Kantang
35	Namtok Phan
36	Namtok Raman
37	Namtok Thara Sawan
38	Sa Nang Manora

Management overview PARO 5 Northwest (Nakhon Si Thammarat)

Management overview PARO 5 Northeast (Nakhon Si Thammarat)

Management overview PARO 5 Southwest (Nakhon Si Thammarat)

Management overview PARO 5 Southeast (Nakhon Si Thammarat)

==== Visitors to 20 national parks (2019) of PARO 5 (Nakhon Si Thammarat) ====
The total number of visitors to 20 national parks in 2019 is 4,177,000.
Hat Noppharat Thara–Mu Ko Phi Phi national park has the largest number of visitors with 1,142,000 (27%).
Ao Phang Nga national park has 999,000 visitors (24%).
Mu Ko Similan national park has 677,000 visitors (16%).
The next four national parks with 130,000 to 238,000 individually, have a total of 768,000 visitors (18%).
The next seven national parks with 50,000 to 98,000 individually, have a total of 493,000 visitors (13%).
The last six national parks with 7,000 to 24,000 individually, have a total of 98,000 visitors (2%).

=== Protected Areas Regional Office 6 (Songkhla) ===
==== Management overview PARO 6 (Songkhla) ====
	National park
1	Khao Nam Khang
2	Khao Pu–Khao Ya
3	San Kala Khiri
	Wildlife sanctuary
4	Khao Banthat
5	Ton Nga Chang

	Non-hunting area
6	Khao Pachang– Laem Kham
7	Khao Reng
8	Pa Krat
9	Phru Khangkhaw
10	Thale Luang
11	Thale Noi
12	Thale Sap

	Forest park
13	Khuan Khao Wang
14	Mueang Kao Chai Buri

Management overview PARO 6 (Songkhla)

==== Visitors to 3 national parks (2019) of PARO 6 (Songkhla) ====
The total number of visitors to 3 national parks in 2019 is 177,000.
Khao Pu–Khao Ya national park has the largest number of visitors with 167,000 (94%).
San Kala Khiri national park has 8,000 visitors (5%).
Khao Nam Khang national park has 2,000 visitors (1%).

=== Protected Areas Regional Office 6 (Pattani branch) ===
==== Management overview PARO 6 (Pattani branch) ====
	National park
1	Ao Manao–Khao Tanyong
2	Bang Lang
3	Budo-Su-ngai Padi
4	Namtok Sai Khao
5	Namtok Si Po

	Wildlife sanctuary
6	Hala-Bala
7	Somdet Phra Thepparat

	Non-hunting area
8	Pa Phru

Management overview PARO 6 (Pattani branch)

==== Visitors to 5 national parks (2019) of PARO 6 (Pattani branch) ====
The total number of visitors to 5 national parks in 2019 is 274,000.
Namtok Sai Khao national park has the largest number of visitors with 105,000 (38%).
Ao Manao-Khao Ranyong national park has 96,000 visitors (35%).
The next two national parks with 26,000 and 36,000 visitors individually, total 62,000 visitors (23%).
Bang Lang national park has 11,000 visitors (4%).

== Northeast ==
As of 2022 the northeast of Thailand is divided into four regions with 23 national parks.

Regional offices	National parks	Responsible for provinces
PARO 7 (Nakhon Ratchasima)	4	Buriram, Chaiyaphum and Nakhon Ratchasima
PARO 8 (Khon Kaen)	6	Kalasin, Khon Kaen and Loei
PARO 9 (Ubon Ratchathani)	6	Amnat Charoen, Mukdahan, Sisaket, Surin and Ubon Ratchathani, Yasothon
PARO 10 (Udon Thani)	7	Bueng Kan, Nakhon Phanom, Nong Bua Lamphu and Nong Khai, Sakon Nakhon, Udon Thani

Map of Northeast Thailand - PARO 7-10

=== Protected Areas Regional Office 7 (Nakhon Ratchasima) ===
==== Management overview PARO 7 (Nakhon Ratchasima) ====
	National park
1	Pa Hin Ngam
2	Phu Laenkha
3	Sai Thong
4	Tat Ton
	Wildlife sanctuary
5	Dong Yai
6	Pha Phueng
7	Phu Khiao

	Non-hunting area
8	Angkepnam Huai Chorakhe Mak
9	Angkepnam Huai Talat
10	Angkepnam Sanambin
11	Bueng Lahan
12	Khao Phaeng Ma
13	Lam Nang Rong
14	Nong Waeng
15	Pa Khao Phu Luang
16	Phu Khao Fai Kradong

	Forest park
17	Khao Kradong

Management overview PARO 7 (Nakhon Ratchasima)

==== Visitors to 4 national parks (2019) of PARO 7 (Nakhon Ratchasima) ====
The total number of visitors to 4 national parks in 2019 is 640,000.
Tat Ton has the largest number of visitors with 389,000 (61%).
The next two national parks, with 94,000 and 106,000 visitors, have a total of 200,000 visitors (31%).
Sai Thong has a total of 51,000 visitors (8%).

=== Protected Areas Regional Office 8 (Khon Kaen) ===
==== Management overview PARO 8 (Khon Kaen) ====
	National park
1	Nam Phong
2	Phu Kradueng
3	Phu Pha Man
4	Phu Ruea
5	Phu Suan Sai
6	Phu Wiang
	Wildlife sanctuary
7	Phu Kho–Phu Kratae
8	Phu Luang

	Non-hunting area
9	Dun Lamphan
10	Lam Pao
11	Tham Pha Nam Thip

	Forest park
12	Chi Long
13	Harirak
14	Kosamphi
15	Namtok Ba Luang
16	Namtok Huai Lao
17	Pha Ngam
18	Phu Bo Bit
19	Phu Faek
20	Phu Han–Phu Ra-Ngam
21	Phu Pha Lom
22	Phu Pha Wua
23	Phu Phra
24	Tham Saeng–Tham Phrommawat

Management overview PARO 8 West (Khon Kaen)

Management overview PARO 8 East (Khon Kaen)

==== Visitors to 6 national parks (2019) of PARO 8 (Khon Kaen) ====
The total number of visitors to 6 national parks in 2019 is 350,000.
Phu Ruea has the largest number of visitors with 170,000 (49%).
The next two national parks, with 68,000 and 86,000 visitors, have a total of 154,000 visitors (44%).
The last three national parks, with 6,000 to 10,000 visitors, only have a total of 26,000 visitors (7%).

=== Protected Areas Regional Office 9 (Ubon Ratchathani) ===
==== Management overview PARO 9 (Ubon Ratchathani) ====
	National park
1	Kaeng Tana
2	Khao Phra Wihan
3	Pha Taem
4	Phu Chong–Na Yoi
5	Phu Pha Thoep
6	Phu Sa Dok Bua

	Wildlife sanctuary
7	Buntharik–Yot Mon
8	Huai Sala
9	Huai Thap Than– Huai Samran
10	Phanom Dong Rak
11	Phu Si Than
12	Yot Dom

	Forest park
13	Dong Bang Yi
14	Namtok Pha Luang
15	Pason Nong Khu
16	Phanom Sawai
17	Phu Sing–Phu Pha Phueng

Management overview PARO 9 (Ubon Ratchathani)

==== Visitors to 6 national parks (2019) of PARO 9 (Ubon Ratchathani) ====
The total number of visitors to 6 national parks in 2019 is 550,000.
Khao Phra Wihan national park has the largest number of visitors with 203,000 (37%).
Pha Taem national park has 180,000 visitors (33%).
The next two national parks, with 48,000 and 86,000 visitors, have a total of 134,000 visitors (25%).
The last two national parks, with 2,000 and 31,000 visitors, only have a total of 33,000 visitors (5%).

=== Protected Areas Regional Office 10 (Udon Thani) ===
==== Management overview PARO 10 (Udon Thani) ====
	National park
1	Na Yung–Nam Som
2	Phu Hin Chom That–Phu Phra Bat
3	Phu Kao–Phu Phan Kham
4	Phu Langka
5	Phu Pha Lek
6	Phu Phan
7	Phu Pha Yon
	Wildlife sanctuary
8	Phu Wua

	Non-hunting area
9	Bueng Khong Long
10	Kutting
11	Nong Han Kumphawapi
12	Nong Hua Khu

	Forest park
13	Bua Ban
14	Namtok Khoi Nang
15	Namtok Than Thip
16	Phu Khao Suan Kwang
17	Phu Pha Daen
18	Phu Pha Daeng
19	Phu Phra Bat Bua Bok
20	Wang Sam Mo

Management overview PARO 10 (Udon Thani)

==== Visitors to 7 national parks (2019) of PARO 10 (Udon Thani) ====
The total number of visitors to 7 national parks in 2019 is 59,000.
Phu Langka national park has the largest number of visitors with 24,000 (41%).
The next two national parks, with 8,000 and 12,000 visitors, have a total of 20,000 visitors (34%).
The last four national parks, with 5,000 to 1,000 visitors, only have a total of 15,000 visitors (25%).

== North ==
As of 2022 the north of Thailand is divided into eight regions with 65 national parks.

Regional offices	National parks	Responsible for provinces
PARO 11 (Phitsanulok)	10	Phetchabun, Phitsanulok and Uttaradit
PARO 12 (Nakhon Sawan)	3	Kamphaeng Phet, Nakhon Sawan, Phichit and Uthai Thani
PARO 13 (Phrae)	10	Nan and Phrae
PARO 13 ( Lampang branch)	6	Lampang and Lamphun
PARO 14 (Tak)	8	Sukhothai and Tak
PARO 15 (Chiang Rai)	8	Chiang Rai and Phayao
PARO 16 (Chiang Mai)	15	Chiang Mai and Lamphun
PARO 16 (Mae Sariang branch)	5	Mae Hong Son

Map of North Thailand - PARO 11-16

=== Protected Areas Regional Office 11 (Phitsanulok) ===
The Protected Areas Regional Office 11 (Phitsanulok) is a Thai government unit under the Department of National Parks, Wildlife and Plant Conservation, one of the Protected Areas Regional Offices of Thailand. Since the beginning one hundred years ago, forest management of office 11 (Phitsanulok) has undergone many changes, in form of reclassifications, name changes and management changes.

==== History of PARO 11 ====
===== 1901-2002 =====
In 1901, an agency called "Forest Region Phitsanulok" was established under the Royal Forest Department, Ministry of Interior, responsible for the following 7 provinces: Kamphaeng Phet, Phetchabun, Phichit, Phitsanulok, Sukhothai, Tak and Uttaradit. Royal Forest Department was reclassified from the Ministry of Interior to the Ministry of Kasettrathikarn in 1921.
"Office Forest Region Phitsanulok" was built near Chan Palace in 1924. A 1932 revision by Royal Forest Department divided the forests in Thailand into 17 regions, "Forest Region Phitsanulok" has 5 provinces to administer: Phetchabun, Phichit, Phitsanulok, Sukhothai and Uttaradit.
An improvement in 1940 divided the forests in Thailand into 11 regions, "Forest Region Phitsanulok" was responsible for 7 provinces: Kamphaeng Phet, Phetchabun, Phichit, Phitsanulok, Sukhothai, Tak and Uttaradit.
Further improvement in 1941 renamed "Forest Region Phitsanulok" to "Forest District Phitsanulok", responsible for 4 provinces: Phetchabun, Phichit, Phitsanulok and Uttaradit. A further improvement in 1952 was intended to establish 21 districts across the country, called "Forest Districts", "Forest District Phitsanulok" was still responsible for the 4 original provinces in 1952. In 1975, "Forest District Phitsanulok" was renamed "Forest District Office Phitsanulok".

===== 2002-present =====
A Royal Decree, no.119, issue 99kor, dated 2 October 2002 stated: Under the Ministry of Natural Resources and Environment, Royal Forest Department remains responsible for economic forestry work and a new Department of National Parks, Wildlife and Plant Conservation is further established, which is divided into 16 regions with 5 branches for the conservation, promotion and restoration of natural resources, wildlife and plant species in forest areas. The name changed to "Protected Areas Regional Office 11 (Phitsanulok), PARO 11.
DNP regulation no.1241/2547 dated 27 July 2004, determined that management office 11 is responsible for 4 provinces: Nan, Phetchabun, Phitsanulok and Uttaradit. DNP regulation no.1808/2547 dated 15 November 2004, restricted the main areas to 3 provinces: Phetchabun, Phitsanulok and Uttaradit.
Its management is divided into 3 entities: National Parks and Forest Parks, Wildlife Sanctuaries and Non-hunting Areas, Botanical Garden and Arboreta.

- Phitsanulok
- Phetchabun
- Uttaradit
- Phichit
- Sukhothai
- Kamphaeng Phet
- Tak
- Nan

==== Relocation ====
Since the Fine Arts Department has renovated the Chan Palace as a historical monument, PARO 11 (Phitsanulok) has to find a new place. On 23 June 2013, the foundation stone was laid for the new building in Tha Thong subdistrict, Mueang district, Phitsanulok province. Later on 25 January 2015 the Chan Palace area was abandoned and handed over to the Fine Arts Department. In Somdet Phra Naresuan the Great Army Camp, 4th Infantry Division, was the temporary office. The new, a typical Thai government building was inaugurated on 2 October 2017.

==== Management overview PARO 11 (Phitsanulok) ====
	National park
1	Khao Kho
2	Khwae Noi
3	Lam Nam Nan
4	Nam Nao
5	Namtok Chat Trakan
6	Phu Hin Rong Kla
7	Phu Soi Dao
8	Tat Mok
9	Thung Salaeng Luang
10	Ton Sak Yai
	Wildlife sanctuary
11	Mae Charim
12	Nam Pat
13	Phu Khat
14	Phu Miang–Phu Thong
15	Phu Pha Daeng
16	Tabo–Huai Yai

	Non-hunting area
17	Ban Yang
18	Bo Pho Thi–Pak Thong Chai
19	Dong Khlo–Huai Kapo
20	Huai Phueng–Wang Yao
21	Khao Kho
22	Khao Noi–Khao Pradu
23	Khao Phanom Thong
24	Khao Yai–Khao Na Pha Tang and Khao Ta Phrom
25	Phu San Khiao
26	Phutthabat Chon Daen
27	Song Khwae
28	Tha Daeng
29	Tham Pha Tha Phon
30	Wang Pong–Chon Daen

	Forest park
31	Bueng Sam Phan
32	Dong Charoen
33	Huai Nam Lee
34	Khao Phlueng–Ban Dan
35	Khao Rang
36	Namtok Mae Choey
37	Wang Tha Dee
	Botanical garden
38	Sakunothayan
	Arboretum
39	Ban Phae
40	Mueang Rat
41	Sap Chom Phu

Management overview PARO 11 (Phitsanulok)

==== Visitors to 10 national parks (2019) of PARO 11 ====
The total number of visitors to 10 national parks in 2019 is 496,000.
Phu Hin Rong Kla National Park has the largest number of visitors with 289,000 (58%).
The next four national parks, with 28,000 to 52,000 visitors individually, have a total of 146,000 visitors (30%).
The last five national parks, with 4,000 to 20,000 visitors individually, only have a total of 61,000 visitors (12%).

=== Protected Areas Regional Office 12 (Nakhon Sawan) ===
==== Management overview PARO 12 (Nakhon Sawan) ====
	National park
1	Khlong Lan
2	Khlong Wang Chao
3	Mae Wong
	Wildlife sanctuary
4	Huai Kha Khaeng
5	Khao Sanam Phriang

	Non-hunting area
6	Bueng Boraphet
7	Tham Phratun
	Forest park
8	Huai Khot
9	Khao Luang
10	Nakhon Chai Bowon
11	Tham Khao Wong
12	Tham Phet–Tham Thong

	Arboretum
13	Kanchana Kuman
14	Paisali

Management overview PARO 12 (Nakhon Sawan)

==== Visitors to 3 national parks (2019) of PARO 12 ====
The total number of visitors to 3 national parks in 2019 is 291,000.
Khlong Lan National Park has the largest number of visitors with 206,000 (71%).
Mae Wong National Park has 52,000 visitors (18%).
Khlong Wang Chao National Park has 33,000 visitors (11%).

=== Protected Areas Regional Office 13 (Phrae) ===
==== Management overview PARO 13 (Phrae) ====
	National park
1	Doi Pha Klong
2	Doi Phu Kha
3	Khun Nan
4	Khun Sathan
5	Mae Charim
6	Mae Yom
7	Nanthaburi
8	Si Nan
9	Tham Sakoen
10	Wiang Kosai

	Wildlife sanctuary
11	Doi Luang
12	Lam Nam Nan Fang Khwa
	Non-hunting area
13	Chang Pha Dan
14	Phu Fa

	Forest park
15	Doi Mon Kaeo–Mon Deng
16	Pha Lak Muen
17	Phae Mueang Phi
18	Tham Pha Tub

Management overview PARO 13 (Phrae)

==== Visitors to 10 national parks (2019) of PARO 13 ====
The total number of visitors to 10 national parks in 2019 is 273,000.
Si Nan National Park has the largest number of visitors with 115,000 (42%).
Doi Phu Kha National Park has 63,000 visitors (23%).
The next two national parks, with 22,000 and 32,000 visitors, have a total of 54,000 visitors (20%).
The last six national parks, with 3,000 to 12,000 visitors, have a total of 41,000 visitors (15%)

=== Protected Areas Regional Office 13 (Lampang branch) ===
==== Management overview PARO 13 (Lampang branch) ====
	National park
1	Chae Son
2	Doi Chong
3	Doi Khun Tan
4	Khelang Banphot
5	Mae Wa
6	Tham Pha Thai

	Wildlife sanctuary
7	Doi Pha Mueang
	Non-hunting area
8	Doi Phra Bat
9	Mae Mai

	Forest park
10	Mon Phraya Chae

Management overview PARO 13 (Lampang branch)

==== Visitors to 6 national parks (2019) of PARO 13 (Lampang branch) ====
The total number of visitors to 6 national parks in 2019 is 315,000.
Chae Son National Park has the largest number of visitors with 248,000 (80%).
The next two national parks, with 16,000 and 34,000 visitors, have a total of 50,000 visitors (15%).
The last three national parks, with 2,000 to 9,000 visitors, have a total of 17,000 visitors (5%)

=== Protected Areas Regional Office 14 (Tak) ===
==== Management overview PARO 14 (Tak) ====
	National park
1	Doi Soi Malai
2	Khun Phawo
3	Lan Sang
4	Mae Moei
5	Namtok Pha Charoen
6	Ramkhamhaeng
7	Si Satchanalai
8	Taksin Maharat

	Wildlife sanctuary
9	Mae Tuen
10	Tham Chao Ram
11	Thung Yai Naresuan East
12	Umphang
	Non-hunting area
13	Tham Chao Ram

	Forest park
14	Namtok Pa La Tha
15	Phra Tat Huai Luek
16	Tham Lom–Tham Wang
17	Tham Ta Kho Bi

Management overview PARO 14 (Tak)

==== Visitors to 8 national parks (2019) of PARO 14 (Tak) ====
The total number of visitors to 8 national parks in 2019 is 302,000.
Namtok Pha Charoen National Park has the largest number of visitors with 152,000 (50%).
The next four national parks, with 23,000 and 39,000 visitors, have a total of 120,000 visitors (40%).
The last three national parks, with 9,000 to 11,000 visitors, have a total of 30,000 visitors (10%)

=== Protected Areas Regional Office 15 (Chiang Rai) ===
==== Management overview PARO 15 (Chiang Rai) ====
	National park
1	Doi Luang
2	Doi Phu Nang
3	Khun Chae
4	Lam Nam Kok
5	Mae Puem
6	Phu Chi Fa
7	Phu Sang
8	Tham Luang– Khun Nam Nang Non
	Wildlife sanctuary
9	Doi Pha Chang
10	Wiang Lo

	Non-hunting area
11	Chiang Saen
12	Doi Insi
13	Don Sila
14	Khun Nam Yom
15	Mae Chan
16	Mae Tho
17	Nong Bong Khai
18	Nong Leng Sai
19	Thap Phaya Lo
20	Wiang Chiang Rung
21	Wiang Thoeng

	Forest park
22	Doi Hua Mae Kham
23	Huai Nam Chang
24	Huai Sai Man
25	Namtok Huai Mae Sak
26	Namtok Huai Tat Thong
27	Namtok Khun Nam Yab
28	Namtok Mae Salong
29	Namtok Nam Min
30	Namtok Si Chomphu
31	Namtok Tat Khwan
32	Namtok Tat Sairung
33	Namtok Tat Sawan
34	Namtok Wang Than Thong
35	Phaya Phiphak
36	Rong Kham Luang
37	San Pha Phaya Phrai
38	Tham Pha Lae

Management overview PARO 15 (Chiang Rai)

==== Visitors to 8 national parks (2019) of PARO 15 (Chiang Rai) ====
The total number of visitors to 7 national parks in 2019 is 605,000.
Phu Chi Fa National Park has the largest number of visitors with 290,000 (48%).
The next two national parks, with 105,000 and 111,000 visitors, have a total of 216,000 visitors (35%).
The next two national parks, with 35,000 and 41,000 visitors, have a total of 76,000 visitors (13%).
The last two national parks, with 11,000 and 12,000 visitors, have a total of 23,000 visitors (4%).

- Due to the hype of the Tham Luang cave rescue operation, the number of visitors for Tham Luang–Khun Nam Nang Non National Park was 1,573,000.

=== Protected Areas Regional Office 16 (Chiang Mai) ===
==== Management overview PARO 16 (Chiang Mai) ====
	National park
1	Doi Inthanon
2	Doi Pha Hom Pok
3	Doi Suthep–Pui
4	Doi Wiang Pha
5	Huai Nam Dang
6	Khun Khan
7	Mae Ping
8	Mae Takhrai
9	Mae Tho
10	Mae Wang
11	Namtok Bua Tong– Namphu Chet Si
12	Op Khan
13	Op Luang
14	Pha Daeng
15	Si Lanna

	Wildlife sanctuary
16	Chiang Dao
17	Mae Lao–Mae Sae
18	Omkoi
19	Samoeng
	Non-hunting area
20	Doi Suthep
21	Mae Lao–Mae Sae
22	Nanthaburi
23	Pa Ban Hong
	Forest park
24	Doi Wiang Kaeo

Management overview PARO 16 (Chiang Mai)

==== Visitors to 15 national parks (2019) of PARO 16 (Chiang Mai) ====
The total number of visitors to 15 national parks in 2019 is 2,009,000.
Doi Inthanon National Park has the largest number of visitors with 874,000 (44%).
Doi Suthep–Pui National Park has 329,000 visitors (16%)
The next two national parks, with 164,000 and 168,000 visitors, have a total of 332,000 visitors (17%).
The next four national parks, with 62,000 to 91,000 visitors, have a total of 315,000 visitors (16%).
The last seven national parks, with 1,000 to 45,000 visitors, have a total of 159,000 visitors (7%).

=== Protected Areas Regional Office 16 (Mae Sariang branch) ===
==== Management overview PARO 16 (Mae Sariang branch) ====
	National park
1	Mae Ngao
2	Mae Sariang
3	Namtok Mae Surin
4	Salawin
5	Tham Pla–Namtok Pha Suea
	Wildlife sanctuary
6	Doi Wiang La
7	Lum Nam Pai
8	Mae Yuam Fang Khwa
9	Salawin
10	San Pan Daen

	Non-hunting area
11	Lum Nam Pai Fang Sai
	Forest park
12	Kaeo Komon
13	Mai sak Yai
14	Namtok Huai Mae Saed
15	Namtok Klo Kho
16	Namtok Mae Sawan Noi
17	Namtok Mae Yuam Luang
18	Namtok Mai Sang Nam
19	Pha Hin Tang
20	Tham Tara Lod
21	Thung Bua Tong

	Arboretum
22	Doi Mak Hin Hom
23	Huai Chom Phu
24	Mae Surin
25	Pong Khae

Management overview PARO 16 (Mae Sariang branch)

==== Visitors to 5 national parks (2019) of PARO 16 (Mae Sariang branch) ====
The total number of visitors to 5 national parks in 2019 is 102,000.
Tham Pla–Namtok Pha Suea has the largest number of visitors with 89,000 (87%).
The next two national parks, with 5,000 and 6,000 visitors, have a total of 11,000 visitors (11%).
Salawin national park has a total of 2,000 visitors (2%).
Mae Sariang national park was still not selling tickets in 2019.

== See also ==
- List of national parks of Thailand
- List of forest parks of Thailand
