= Wiang Kosai National Park =

National park of Thailand

- อุทยานแห่งชาติเวียงโกศัย
- IUCN category II (national park)
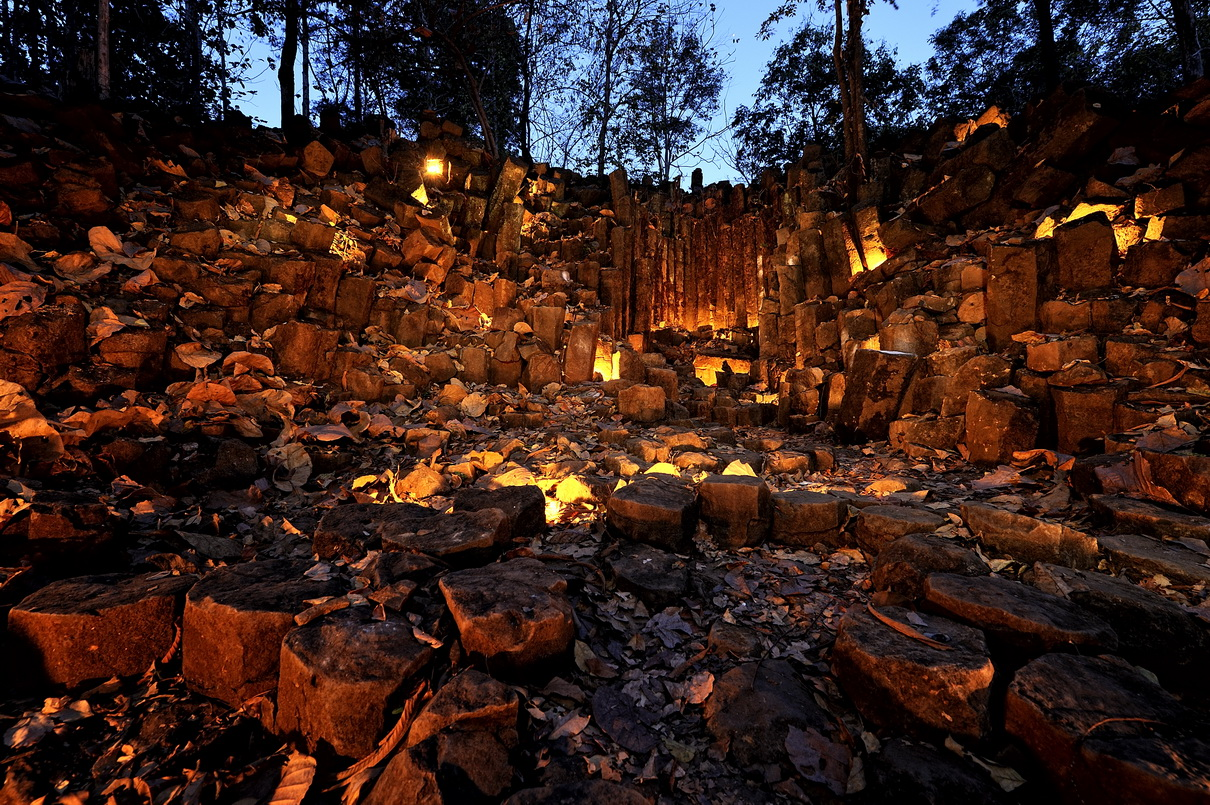
- Columnar basalt formations in park

- Location within Thailand
- Location: Lampang and Phrae Provinces
- Coordinates: 17.93°N 99.55°E
- Area: 410 km^{2} (160 sq mi)
- Established: 1981
- Visitors: 22,060 (in 2019)
- Governing body: Department of National Park, Wildlife and Plant Conservation

Wiang Kosai National Park (Thai: อุทยานแห่งชาติเวียงโกศัย) is a national park in Northern Thailand. It covers parts of the Wang Chin District of Phrae Province and Mae Tha, Thoen and Sop Prap Districts of Lampang Province.

== Description ==
Wiang Kosai National Park, with an area of 256,115 rai ~ 410 square kilometres (160 sq mi) is located in one of the mountain chains of the Phi Pan Nam Range, with the highest peak, Doi Mae Tom, reaching 1,267 m. The sources of many rivers, such as Mae Koeng, Mae Chok, Mae Sin and Mae Pak, are in these mountains. The park has two famous waterfalls, Mae Koeng Luang and Mae Koeng Noi, as well as the Mae Chok hot spring.

== Flora and fauna ==
The mountains are largely covered with dry evergreen and mixed deciduous forest. The park used to be one of the few protected areas in Thailand where Asian elephants roamed in their natural habitat; formerly Tigers were also abundant in the mountains, but there have been no sightings in recent years. Currently animals in the park area include the Indian Muntjac, the Tree Shrew and the Indochinese Flying Squirrel.

== Location ==
Wiang Kosai National Park in overview PARO 13 (Phrae)

10) Wiang Kosai National Park in overview PARO 13 (Phrae)

	National park
1	Doi Pha Klong
2	Doi Phu Kha
3	Khun Nan
4	Khun Sathan
5	Mae Charim
6	Mae Yom
7	Nanthaburi
8	Si Nan
9	Tham Sakoen
10	Wiang Kosai

	Wildlife sanctuary
11	Doi Luang
12	Lam Nam Nan Fang Khwa
	Non-hunting area
13	Chang Pha Dan
14	Phu Fa

	Forest park
15	Doi Mon Kaeo–Mon Deng
16	Pha Lak Muen
17	Phae Mueang Phi
18	Tham Pha Tub

== See also ==
- List of national parks of Thailand
- DNP - Wiang Kosai National Park
- List of Protected Areas Regional Offices of Thailand
