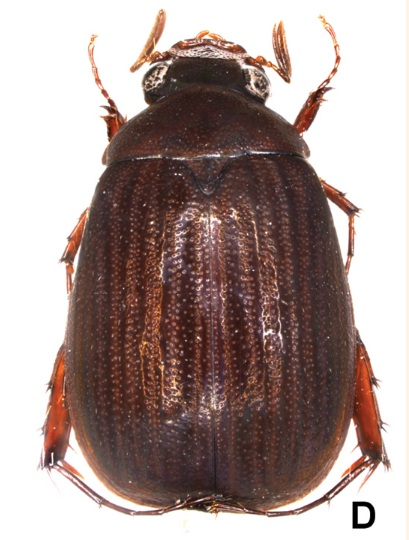

Scientific classification
- Kingdom: Animalia
- Phylum: Arthropoda
- Clade: Pancrustacea
- Class: Insecta
- Order: Coleoptera
- Suborder: Polyphaga
- Infraorder: Scarabaeiformia
- Family: Scarabaeidae
- Genus: Tetraserica
- Species: T. doiphukhaensis

Binomial name
- Tetraserica doiphukhaensis Fabrizi, Dalstein & Ahrens, 2019

= Tetraserica doiphukhaensis =

Species of beetle

Tetraserica doiphukhaensis is a species of beetle of the family Scarabaeidae. It is found in Thailand.

== Description ==
Adults reach a length of about 8.8 mm. The surface of the labroclypeus and the disc of the frons are glabrous. The smooth area anterior to the eye is twice as wide as long.

== Etymology ==
The species is named after the type locality, the Doi Phu Kha National Park.
