= Phu Fa waterfall =

Coordinates: 19°00′10″N 101°12′58″E

Phu Fa Waterfall
- Interactive map of Phu Fa Waterfall
- Location: Mae Charim District, Nan Province, Thailand

Phu Fa is a waterfall in the deep jungle of the Luang Prabang Range near the Laos border. It is located in the protected area of Doi Phu Kha National Park, Mae Charim District. Phu Fa waterfall is the biggest and the tallest waterfall in Nan Province.

The waterfall has 12 tiers made of multi level stone cliffs, giving the impression of a giant stair. At the bottom is a big vast pool with deep water; from there one can see clearly the first, the second and the third tier, which together are over 100 metres high. Beyond that one needs to trek up stone cliffs to view this beauty. At the 5th and the 6th tier, water channels down from high cliff then divides into two waterfalls. On the 10th, water forms a curtain that spans the big wide rock face. On the top tier, the 12th, tremendous water thunders down from sky-high cliff.

Phu Fa waterfall is accessible by foot and there is a jungle tour that takes 4 days and 3 nights. Alternately the walk can be combined with boat trip and may only take 3 days and 2 nights.

== See also ==
- List of waterfalls
