= I Promise I Will Come Back =

- ฉันคอยเธอ
- Genre: Boys' love; Romance drama
- Screenplay by: TK & SD
- Directed by: Kajakampanat; Kreangsak Muangsaen (เกรียงศักดิ์ เมืองแสน); Tinnakorn Puwasakdiwong (ทินกร ภูวศักดิวงศ์)
- Starring: Tinnakorn Puwasakdiwong; Noratape Nontarat; Hsia Chen En; Hsia Chen Te
- Country of origin: Thailand
- Original language: Thai
- No. of episodes: 8

Production
- Executive producer: Tinnakorn Puwasakdiwong
- Producer: Tinnakorn Puwasakdiwong
- Running time: 47 minutes

Original release
- Network: Channel 7, WeTV
- Release: May 19 – July 7, 2025

I Promise I Will Come Back (ฉันคอยเธอ) is a Thai romance and boys' love television series produced by Passakom Klomklom. Directed by Kajakampanat, Kreangsak Muangsaen and Tinnakorn Puwasakdiwong, the series stars Tinnakorn Puwasakdiwong, Noratape Nontarat, Hsia Chen En and Hsia Chen Te. It originally aired on Channel 7 from May 19 to July 7, 2025, and was later made available on WeTV.

The series is inspired by the legend of Chao Nang Aranyanee, a traditional tale from Phrae province, and combines romance, fantasy and elements of northern Thai culture.

== Synopsis ==
TK is a young man living in northern Thailand whose quiet life changes after meeting Victor, a foreign traveller visiting the region. What begins as a chance encounter gradually develops into a close relationship bound by a promise to meet again.

Inspired by a local legend, the story follows several characters connected through love, friendship and longing, exploring how events from the past continue to shape the present. Throughout the series, TK and Victor face personal challenges while trying to keep the promise they made to one another.

== Cast ==
=== Main ===
- Tinnakorn Puwasakdiwong as TK
- Hsia Chen En as Victor
- Noratape Nontarat as Nan Krai
- Hsia Chen Te as San Lian

=== Recurring ===
- Ploypimpha Phatchindasin as Som-O
- Thirasak Kaewyoddee as Marc
- Kreangsak Muangsaen as Dan
- Penpak Sirikul as Khun Jamnian
- Wannasa Thongviset as Chao Nang

== Production ==
The series was produced by Passakom Klomklom, with a screenplay by TK & SD and direction by Kajakampanat, Kreangsak Muangsaen and Tinnakorn Puwasakdiwong.

The story is based on the legend of Chao Nang Aranyanee, a traditional tale from Phrae province centred on love and devotion that served as the inspiration for the series.

Principal photography was officially launched on January 17, 2025, during a blessing ceremony held at Tham Pha Nang Khoi Cave in Phrae Province. The event was attended by provincial officials, members of the cast and production crew. According to the organisers, the project also aimed to promote tourism and showcase the province's cultural heritage through audiovisual media.

== Release ==
I Promise I Will Come Back premiered on May 19, 2025, airing on Mondays on Channel 7, with subsequent streaming availability on WeTV.

In November 2025, the series returned to Channel 7HD for a Saturday-night rebroadcast.

== Awards and nominations ==
Year	Award	Category	Result
2025	Thailand Y Content Awards	Outstanding Thai Cultural Promotion	Nominated
2025	Thailand Y Content Awards	Outstanding Thai Tourism Promotion	Nominated
