= Luang Prabang montane rain forests =

Ecoregion in Central Laos and Northeast Thailand

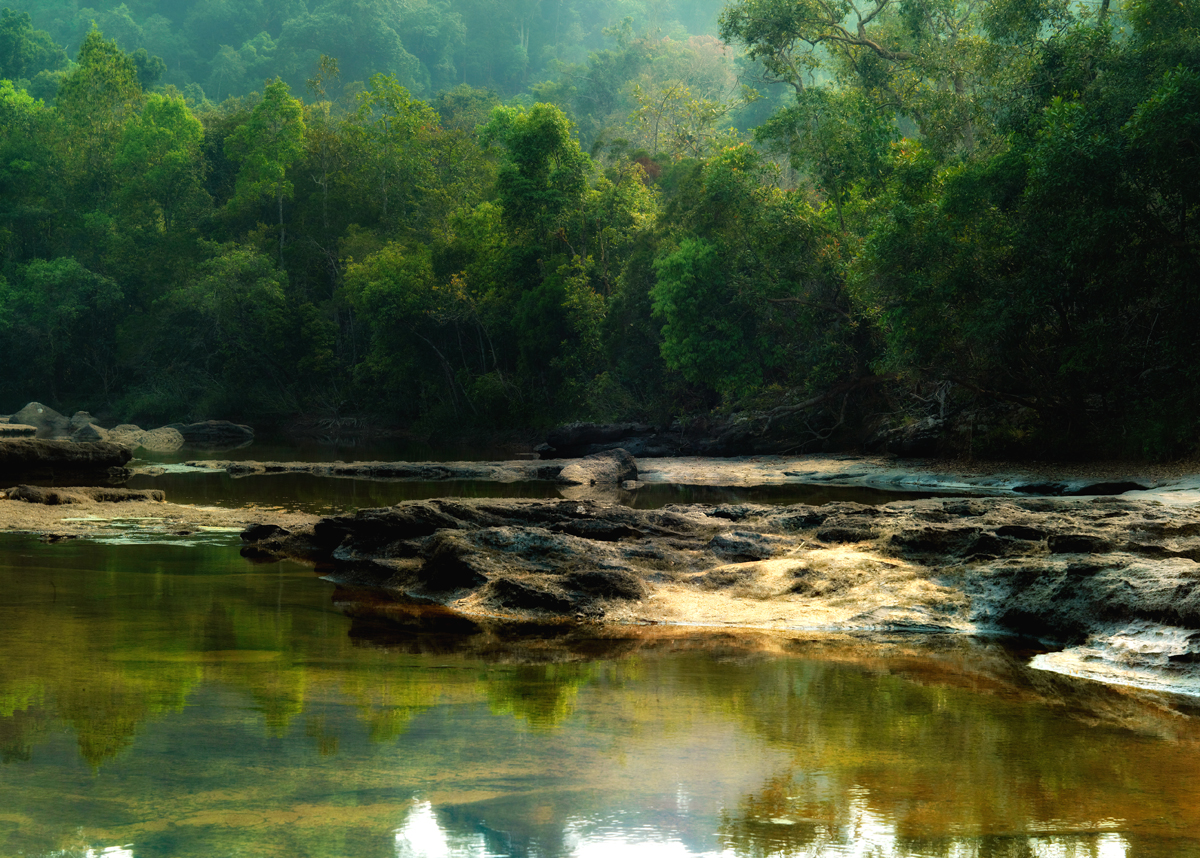
- Landscape in Phou Khao Khouay National Conservation Area

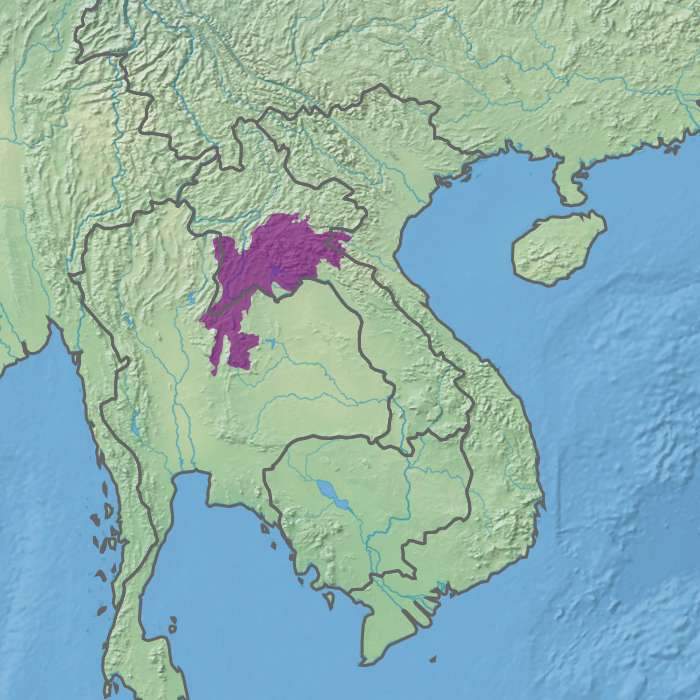
- Ecoregion territory (in purple)

Ecology
- Realm: Indomalayan
- Biome: Tropical and subtropical moist broadleaf forests
- Borders: List: Central Indochina dry forests; Northern Annamites rain forests; Northern Indochina subtropical forests; Northern Khorat Plateau moist deciduous forests; Northern Thailand–Laos moist deciduous forests

Geography
- Area: 71,743 km^{2} (27,700 sq mi)
- Country: Thailand, Laos, Vietnam
- Coordinates: 19°N 103°E

Conservation
- Protected: 18.9%

The Luang Prabang montane rain forests ecoregion (WWF ID: IM0121) covers elevations over 800 meters in the Luang Prabang mountains that straddle the border between northern Thailand and north-central Laos, and the highlands that stretch eastward across north-central Laos. While much of the forest cover has been degraded, there are still large areas of relatively untouched forest.

== Location and description ==
The Luang Prabang Range is the easternmost of the north-south mountain ranges of northern Thailand. Together with the highlands of north-central Laos they form an ecoregion of very high rainfall (2,000-3,000 mm/year) during the May to October rainy season, and a relatively long dry season during the rest of the year.

The ecoregion grades into the montane Northern Indochina subtropical forests to the northeast and the Northern Annamites rain forests to the east. dry forests covers the lower-elevation Khorat Plateau to the south and the Chao Phraya lowlands to the west. The Northern Khorat Plateau moist deciduous forests are a transition between the Luang Prabang forests and the Khorat Plateau's dry forests, and the Northern Thailand-Laos moist deciduous forests cover the foothills and river valleys to the north and west of the Luang Prabang forests.

== Climate ==
The climate of the ecoregion is Tropical monsoon climate (Köppen climate classification (Aw)). This climate is characterized by relatively even temperatures throughout the year (all months being greater than 18 °C (64 °F) average temperature), and a pronounced dry season. The driest month has less than 60 mm of precipitation, but more than (100-(monthly average)/25) mm. The dry month usually at or right after the winter solstice in the Northern Hemisphere. Rainfall in the mountains of northern Laos can average 2,000-3,000 mm/year.

== Flora ==
There is not one single type of rainforest in the ecoregion. Rather, there are many different forest communities reflecting location, elevation, and local climate. Starting at 800 meters elevation, the lower tropical seasonal rainforest becomes the montane rainforest, with a dominant canopy of Dipterocarpus turbinatus (source of keruing wood), and Wax tree (Toxicodendron succedaneum). Also present at this transitional level are palm trees such as the Sugar palm (Arenga pinnata). At elevations of 1,500 meters, broadleaf evergreen forests of Castanopsis hystrix are found. The low, open nature of the forest may be due to past clearing or fire. At these levels there are also conifer hardwood forests of Quercus griffithii (an oak with an oblong crown) and Keteleeria (Keteleeria evelyniana). Thinner soils support Engelhardia on granitic soils, or Khasi pine (Pinus kesiya) on clay or sandstone.

== Fauna ==
Due to the relative isolation of the area, there are significant populations of rare large mammals including the critically endangered Red-shanked douc, the endangered Asian elephant, and the endangered Eld's deer. Over 540 bird species are known to have territory extending into the ecoregion.

== Protected areas ==
18.9% of the ecoregion is in protected areas. Protected areas in the ecoregion include:

- Nam Phouy National Biodiversity Conservation Area, home to the largest population of wild elephants in Laos. (2,000 km^{2})
- Khun Nan National Park, on the Thai side of the Luang Prabang, known for its waterfalls and streams. (249 km^{2})
- Phou Khao Khouay National Park, 40 km north of Vientiane in Laos, with three large rivers flowing into the Mekong River. (1920 km^{2})
- Phu Luang Wildlife Sanctuary, in northern Thailand, supports a population of 100 wild Asian elephants. (897 km^{2}).
- Nam Nao National Park, in the Luang Prabang of northern, supporting Thailand different forest types, deciduous and evergreen. (1,000 km^{2})
- Nam Et-Phou Louey National Park is in the northeast of the ecoregion, and also protects portions of the Northern Indochina subtropical forests and Northern Thailand–Laos moist deciduous forests ecoregions.
- Doi Phukha National Park
- Khlong Tron National Park
- Mae Charim National Park
- Namtok Chat Trakan National Park
- Phu Hin Rong Kla National Park
- Phu Kradueng National Park
- Phu Pha Man National Park
- Phu Rua National Park
- Phu Soi Dao National Park
- Si Nan National Park
- Taad Moak National Park
- Thung Salaeng Luang National Park
