= Northern Khorat Plateau moist deciduous forests =

Ecoregion in Northern Khorat Plateau

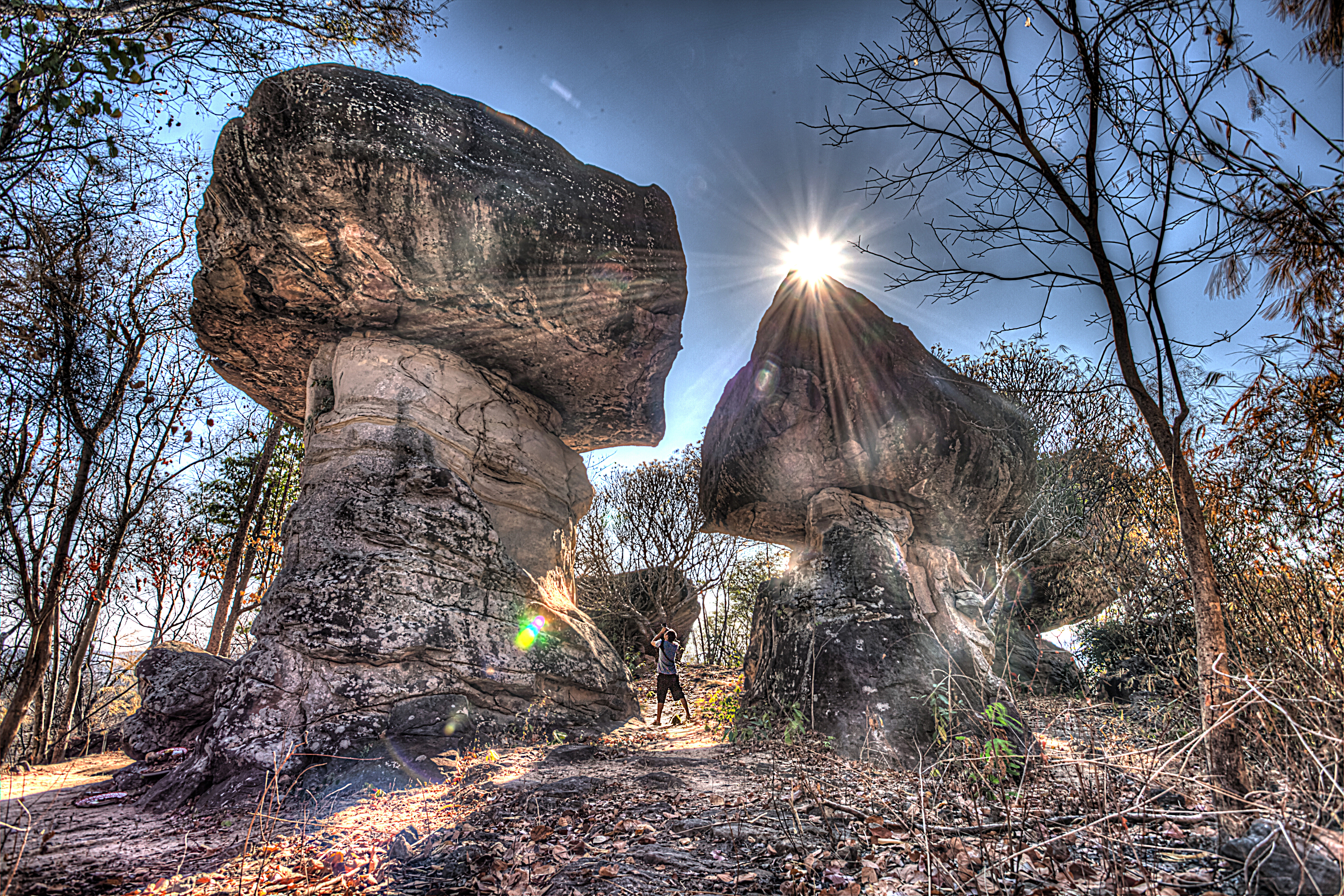
- Rock formation in Phu Kao–Phu Phan Kham National Park

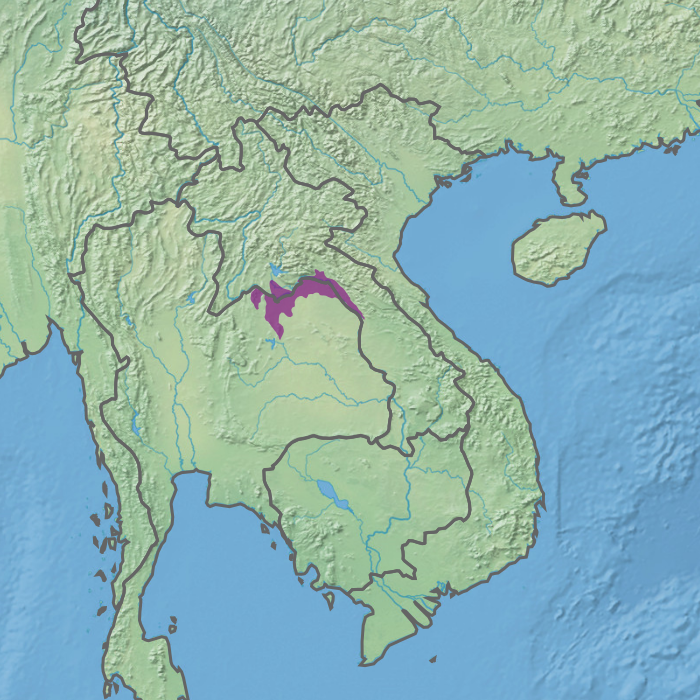
- Ecoregion territory (in purple)

Ecology
- Realm: Indomalayan
- Biome: Tropical and subtropical moist broadleaf forests
- Borders: Central Indochina dry forests; Luang Prabang montane rain forests; Northern Annamites rain forests

Geography
- Area: 16,835 km^{2} (6,500 sq mi)
- Country: Laos, Thailand
- Coordinates: 18.25°N 103.75°E

Conservation
- Protected: 2.35%

The Northern Khorat Plateau moist deciduous forests ecoregion (WWF ID: IM0138) covers a small area on the border between northeastern Thailand and Laos, in the transition zone between the drier Khorat Plateau to the south and the wetter Annamite Range and Luang Prabang Range mountains to the north. Much of the ecoregion has been converted to agriculture along the floodplain of the middle course of the Mekong River.

== Location and description ==
The ecoregion follows the floodplain of the Mekong River for 350 km along the border between Thailand and Laos. Vientiane, the capital city of Laos, is near the western edge of the region. The river through this region cuts through a number of low mountain ridges that reach to 800 meters, although the majority of the ecoregion is on the river plain averaging 200 meters.

== Climate ==
The climate of the ecoregion is Tropical monsoon climate (Köppen climate classification (Aw)). This climate is characterized by relatively even temperatures throughout the year (all months being greater than 18 °C (64 °F) average temperature), and a pronounced dry season. The driest month has less than 60 mm of precipitation, but more than (100-(average/25) mm. This climate is mid-way between a tropical rainforest and a tropical savannah. The dry month usually at or right after the winter solstice in the Northern Hemisphere. Precipitation in this ecoregion has averaged 1,629 mm/year in recent years.

== Flora and fauna ==
About 42% is given over to agriculture, about 50% is closed or open forest, and the remainder is urbanized, scrub, or water. Most of the forest is semi-evergreen deciduous trees, characterized by Lagerstroemia angustifolia (a species of myrtle tree), Afzelia xylocarpa, Xylia xylocarpa (a hardwood with bright yellow flowers), Peltophorum dasyrrhachis (another deciduous tree with yellow flowers), and the Burma padauk (Pterocarpus macrocarpus).

Within the forests of this ecoregion, the dry evergreen portion contain more species of mammals than the deciduous forest which produces less suitable food. Mammal species include the endangered Pileated gibbon (Hylobates pileatus) and the endangered wild Asian elephant (Elephas maximus). There are also sites of high biodiversity along the banks of the Mekong River, with extensive habitat of shifting sand bars and exposed bedrock. A popular cover in these riverine habitats is willow-leaved water croton (Homonoia riparia) which grows in wet soils near the river.

== Protected areas ==
2.35% of the ecoregion is in protected areas. Protected areas include:

- Phou Khao Khouay National Park, a mixture of river plain and mountainous territory 40 km northeast of Vientiane, Laos.
- Phou Pha Nang National Protected Area in Laos
- Phu Kao–Phu Phan Kham National Park, a mountainous region in Thailand south of Vientiane.
- Phu Langka National Park in Thailand
- Phu Wua Wildife Sanctuary in Thailand
