= Doi Phu Kha =

Mountain in northern Thailand

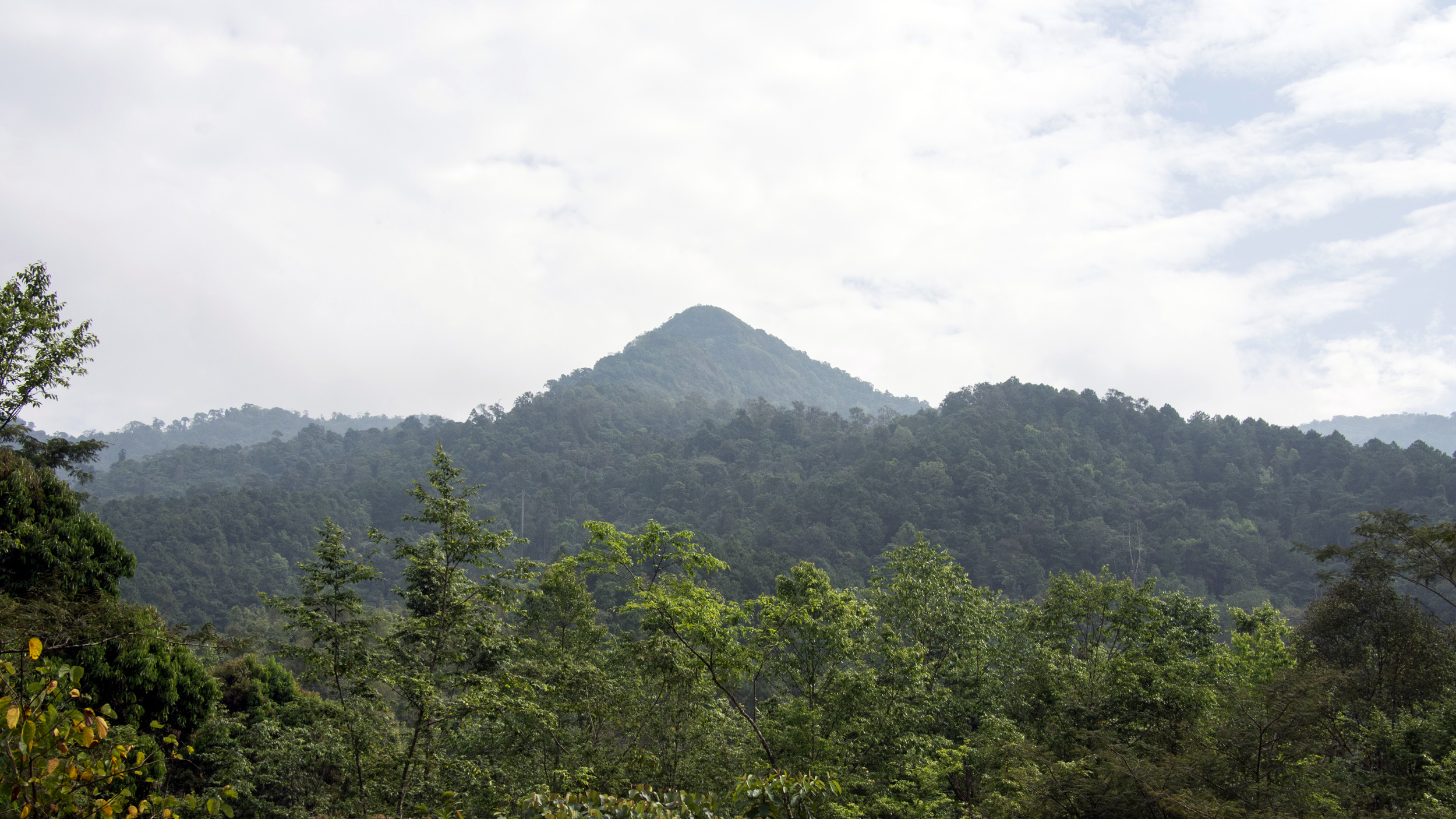
- The top of Doi Phu Kha as seen from the park headquarters

Highest point
- Elevation: 1,910 m (6,270 ft)
- Coordinates: 19°11′35″N 101°06′21″E

Geography
- Location within Thailand
- Location: Thailand
- Parent range: Luang Prabang Range

Climbing
- First ascent: unknown

Doi Phu Kha (Thai: ดอยภูคา) is a mountain that is part of the Luang Prabang Range (ทิวเขาหลวงพระบาง) in Southeast Asia.

It is a rugged mountain in a forested area of Nan Province, at the east end of the Thai highlands, 18 km (11 mi) west of the border between Laos and Thailand. The Doi Phu Kha National Park, Northern Thailand's largest national park, is in the area surrounding the mountain.

== See also ==
- Doi Phu Kha National Park
- List of mountains in Thailand
