= Phrae province =

Province of Thailand

Coordinates: 18°8′42″N 100°8′26″E

Phrae แพร่ ᨻᩯᩖ᩵
- Province
- จังหวัดแพร่ · ᨧᩢ᩠ᨦᩉ᩠ᩅᩢᨻᩯᩖ᩵
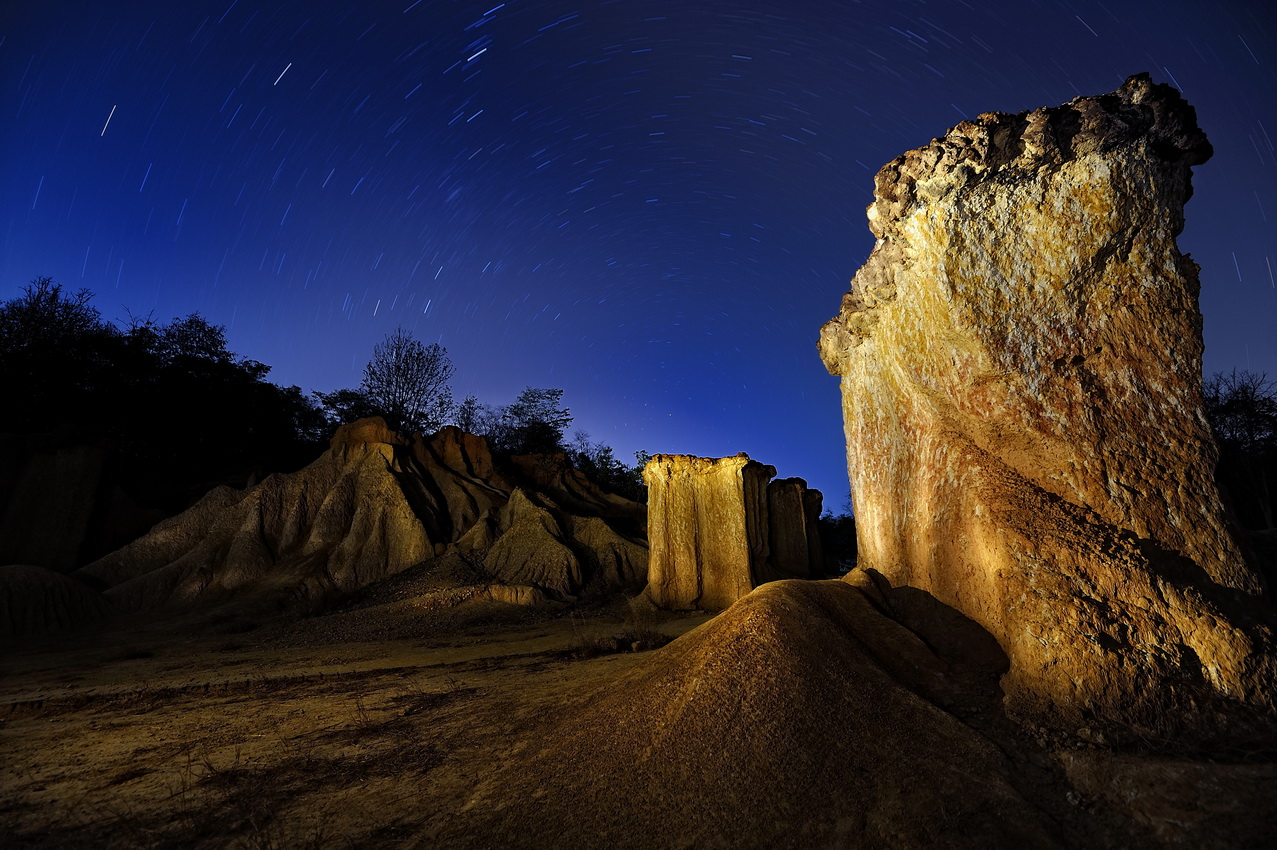
- Phae Mueang Phi (Ghost Canyon) - Thailand's "Grand Canyon" near Phrae

- Flag Seal
- Mottoes: หม้อห้อมไม้สัก ถิ่นรักพระลอ ช่อแฮศรีเมือง ลือเลื่องแพะเมืองผี คนแพร่นี้ใจงาม ("Mo hom fabric and teak wood. Place of Phra Lo's love. Home of (Phra That) Cho Hae. Famed Phae Mueang Phi. The generous people of Phrae.")
- Map of Thailand highlighting Phrae province
- Country: Thailand
- Capital: Phrae

Government
  - Governor: Somchai Lertprasitthiphan

Area
  - Total: 6,483 km^{2} (2,503 sq mi)
  - Rank: 32nd

Population (2024)
  - Total: ▼421,745
  - Rank: 62nd
  - Density: 65/km^{2} (170/sq mi)
  - Rank: 67th

Human Achievement Index
  - HAI (2022): 0.6552 "somewhat high" Ranked 19th

GDP
  - Total: baht 28 billion (US$1.0 billion) (2019)
- Time zone: UTC+7 (ICT)
- Postal code: 54xxx
- Calling code: 054
- ISO 3166 code: TH-54
- Website: phrae.go.th

Phrae Provincial Administrative Organization องค์การบริหารส่วนจังหวัดแพร่
- Provincial Administrative Organization
- Interactive map of Phrae Provincial Administrative Organization

Government
  - Type: Local administrative divisions
  - Body: Phrae Provincial Administrative Organization
  - President: Anuwat Wongwan
- Website: phraepao.go.th

Phrae province
- "Phrae" in Thai language (top) and Northern Thai with Tai Tham script (bottom)

Thai name
- Thai: แพร่
- RTGS: Phrae

Northern Thai name
- Northern Thai: ᨻᩯᩖ᩵ (Phae)

Phrae (Thai: แพร่, pronounced [pʰrɛ̂ː]; Northern Thai: ᨻᩯᩖ᩵, pronounced [pɛ̂ː]) is one of Thailand's seventy-six Provinces (changwat) and lies in upper northern Thailand. Neighboring provinces are (clockwise from north) Phayao, Nan, Uttaradit, Sukhothai, and Lampang.

== Geography ==
Phrae is in the valley of the Yom River. The Phi Pan Nam Range runs across the province from north to south in the west. The Phlueng Range is in the east. The total forest area is 4,204 km^{2} (1,623 sq mi) or 64.8 percent of provincial area.

=== National parks ===
There are four national parks, of which three in region 13 (Phrae) and Lam Nam Nan in region 11 (Phitsanulok), they are the protected areas in Phrae province. (Visitors in fiscal year 2024)

Lam Nam Nan National Park	999 km^{2} (386 sq mi)	(37,174)
Mae Yom National Park	455 km^{2} (176 sq mi)	(5,445)
Wiang Kosai National Park	410 km^{2} (160 sq mi)	(16,616)
Doi Pha Klong National Park	189 km^{2} (73 sq mi)	(2,553)

=== Wildlife sanctuaries ===
There are two wildlife sanctuaries in region 13 (Phrae) and they are the protected areas in Phrae province.

Lam Nam Nan Fang Khwa Wildlife Sanctuary	235 km^{2} (91 sq mi)
Doi Luang Wildlife Sanctuary	97 km^{2} (37 sq mi)

=== Location protected areas ===
Overview of protected areas of Phrae

Phrae protected areas

	National park
1	Doi Pha Klong
2	Lam Nam Nan
3	Mae Yom
4	Wiang Kosai

	Wildlife sanctuary
5	Doi Luang
6	Lam Nam Nan Fang Khwa

== History ==
The earliest dated object from the province is the Wat Bang Sanuk inscription, C.107, found at Wang Chin in the early 1940s and dated by Hans Penth to Thursday 28 March 1219. It names no overlord, and gives its ruler only the title khun, which in the 13th century could denote the head of an independent principality. David K. Wyatt read the two places it names, Müang Trōk Salōp and Chæ Ngun, as a paired polity somewhere in the upper Yom valley between Si Satchanalai and Phrae, on the model of Sukhothai and Si Satchanalai rather than as an old and a new name for one town. Wyatt sets the peopling of the upper Yom beside that of the Nan and the Ping: from Phrae, Phayao and Chiang Rai families moved down the Yom, as others moved down the Nan from the U River valley and down the Ping from Lampang and Lamphun. The Wat Bang Sanuk inscription is also one of a small group of early Tai inscriptions using the northern sixty-year cycle of days and years, a reckoning Wyatt describes as unique to Tai-language texts and in the other examples named as Thai in contradistinction to Khōm. Chusak Satienpattanodom places Müeang Trōk Salōp more narrowly, at modern Wang Chin, and describes it as a frontier town of Si Satchanalai that stood outside Sukhothai's control at times.

A relic chronicle of the province, the Tamnan Phra That Doi Pu Phu Thap, Mueang Long lae Laem Ri of Long district, was first written down about 1638. It tells of a lord of Lavo who came to Thung Yang and raised a Buddha image from the river. The history of Phrae is also traced back to the Haripunchai kingdom of the Mon.

Phrae was contested between Sukhothai and Lan Na through the 14th century. Khamfu of Lan Na attacked it without success, and Lithai of Sukhothai took it in 1359 and removed fifteen households to Si Satchanalai as servants of Wat Pa Daeng. In 1393 the ruler of Phrae was one of four kinsmen who swore an alliance with Sai Lue Thai of Sukhothai, the others being the rulers of Nan, Ngao and Phlua. It became part of Lan Na in 1443, when King Tilokaraj was on an expedition to capture Nan.

Phrae had no river of its own running south, and its traffic left over the Khao Phlueng pass to the Nan. Traders from Phrae crossed on foot to the market at Tha Sao, above Uttaradit, where goods shipped up the Nan from Bangkok were exchanged for those carried overland. The same pass carried armies. Phiset Jiajanphong suggested that Tilokaraj used it in the opposite direction for his first campaign southward, after Phrae and Nan were secured, though the chronicle does not say. In 1852 Krom Luang Wongsathirat Sanit massed the royal army at Tha It for a month, then crossed Khao Phlueng into Phrae on the way to Kengtung. The contrast between the river route and the overland one shows in the reception of Chulalongkorn at Uttaradit in October 1901. The lord of Nan came by boat, the lords of Lampang and Phrae by land.

== Symbols ==
Provincial seal: According to legend the two cities of Phrae and Nan were once ruled by brothers. When they met to divide the land between them the one from Phrae rode on a horse, the one from Nan on a buffalo to the meeting point on top of a mountain. Hence Phrae uses a horse in their seal, while Nan uses a buffalo. When the provincial government proposed the seal in 1940, the Fine Arts Department suggested adding a historic building to the seal in addition to the horse, thus it now has the stupa of Phra Tat Cho Hae on the back of the horse. This temple is about nine kilometers southeast of the city of Phrae.

The provincial flower and tree is the Burmese Almondwood (Chukrasia tabularis). The provincial fish is black sharkminnow (Labeo chrysophekadion).

== Transportation ==
The main road through Phrae is Route 101, which begins in Nan to the north, passes through Phrae, and leads to Sawankhalok, Sukhothai, and finally Kamphaeng Phet.

Phrae Airport is a small airport in Mueang Mo, on the east side of town. It handles only domestic flights from Don Mueang (DMK).

The provincial railway station is Den Chai in Den Chai District, 24 km (14.9 mi) from Phrae town, since the town of Phrae does not have a rail to reach.

== Tourism ==
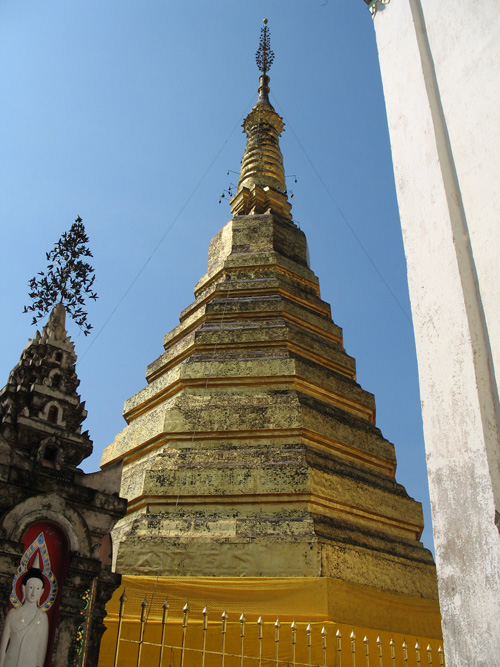
Phra That Cho Hae, the symbol of Phrae province

Wiang Kosai National Park (อุทยานแห่งชาติเวียงโกศัย) contains two waterfalls, the Mae Koeng Luang (น้ำตกแม่เกิ๋งหลวง), and the Mae Koeng Noi (น้ำตกแม่เกิ๋งน้อย). Streams from the falls flow into the Yom River. Tham Pha Nang Khoi Cave (ถ้ำผานางคอย). At the end of the cave is a stalagmite shaped like a woman holding a small child. In front of the Nang Koi (waiting woman) stone is a heart-shaped stalactite. They are the source of the legend of the love of a woman who waited for her lover until she turned to stone.

Mae Yom National Park and well-known Phae Mueang Phi Forest Park.

In addition, Phrae is also a province full of historic buildings. These buildings, all over 100 years old, were built in the Rattanakosin period or being used in the wood trading business that was once prosperous in the past.

== Administrative divisions ==
Map of eight districts

=== Provincial government ===
The province is divided into eight districts (amphoes). These are further divided into 78 subdistricts (tambons) and 645 villages (mubans).

1. Mueang Phrae
2. Rong Kwang
3. Long
4. Sung Men
5. Den Chai
6. Song
7. Wang Chin
8. Nong Muang Khai

=== Local government ===
As of 26 November 2019 there are: one Phrae Provincial Administration Organisation (ongkan borihan suan changwat) and 26 municipal (thesaban) areas in the province. Phrae has town (thesaban mueang) status. Further 25 subdistrict municipalities (thesaban tambon). The non-municipal areas are administered by 57 Subdistrict Administrative Organisations - SAO (ongkan borihan suan tambon).

== Human achievement index 2022 ==
Health	Education	Employment	Income
75	18	57	48
Housing	Family	Transport	Participation
18	34	16	5
Province Phrae, with an HAI 2022 value of 0.6552 is "somewhat high", occupies place 19 in the ranking.

Since 2003, United Nations Development Programme (UNDP) in Thailand has tracked progress on human development at sub-national level using the Human achievement index (HAI), a composite index covering all the eight key areas of human development. National Economic and Social Development Board (NESDB) has taken over this task since 2017.

Rank	Classification
1–13	"High"
14–29	"Somewhat high"
30–45	"Average"
46–61	"Somewhat low"
62–77	"Low"

Map with provinces and HAI 2022 rankings
