= Tham Pha Nang Khoi =

Cave in Phrae province, Thailand

- Tham Nang Khoi
- Location within Thailand
- Coordinates: 18°22′08.02″N 100°21′04.03″E
- Length: 1.6 kilometres (1 mile)
- Geology: Karst cave

Tham Pha Nang Khoi (Thai: ถ้ำผานางคอย, lit. 'Cliff Cave of the Waiting Princess', Thai pronunciation: [tʰâm pʰāː nāːŋ kʰɔɔy]) is a karst cave in the Rong Kwang District of Phrae Province, in northern Thailand.

== Description ==
The cave's main entrance chamber is 150 metres (492 feet) long and is located on a cliff. The cave resembles a zigzag winding through 1.6 kilometres (1 mile) of limestone strata. There are many strangely formed stalagmites and stalactites, near the end of the cave there is a clump of stalagmites which resemble a woman holding a child.

== Folklore ==
The name of the cave comes from a legend, that there was a king who had a very beautiful and kind daughter named "Princess Aranyani". The princess was traveling on a boat when it suddenly capsized, but a soldier saved her and they fell in love. Princess Aranyani got pregnant to which her father became enraged and he imprisoned the princess. The soldier freed the princess and then they escaped together, but the king ordered his men to go and capture them. The king's men trailed behind until they caught up to them at a valley. One of the king's men shot an arrow which hit the princess, the soldier and the princess then fled into a cave to treat her wounds. The princess saw that the king's men were coming so she alerted the soldier and told him to run away and that she would wait for him in the cave.
