= Doi Phi Pan Nam =

Mountain in Laos and Thailand

- Location within Laos

Highest point
- Elevation: 1,745 m (5,725 ft)
- Listing: List of mountains in Thailand
- Coordinates: 19°07′33″N 101°15′22″E

Geography
- Location: Lao – Thai border
- Parent range: Luang Prabang Range

Climbing
- First ascent: unknown
- Easiest route: hike

Doi Phi Pan Nam, Thai: ดอยผีปันน้ำ, is a 1,745 m high mountain of the Luang Prabang Range (ทิวเขาหลวงพระบาง) in Southeast Asia.

It is at the east end of the Thai highlands, on the Laos-Thailand border. The Wa River has its source beneath this mountain.

== See also ==
- Khun Nan National Park
- List of mountains in Thailand
