= Phou Khe =

Mountain in Thailand

Phu Khe
- Location within Thailand

Highest point
- Elevation: 2,079 m (6,821 ft)
- Prominence: 1,646 m (5,400 ft)
- Listing: Ultra; Ribu
- Coordinates: 19°19′28″N 101°14′27″E

Geography
- Location: Lao – Thai border
- Parent range: Luang Prabang Range

Climbing
- First ascent: unknown

Phou Khe (Thai: ภูเข้, RTGS: Phu Khe, pronounced [pʰūː kʰêː]) is a mountain in Southeast Asia, part of the Luang Prabang Range (ทิวเขาหลวงพระบาง).

It is at the east end of the Thai highlands, on the border between Laos and Thailand. The mountain lies straddles the border of Nan Province, Thailand and Sainyabuli Province, Laos. With a height of 2,079 metres and a prominence of 1,646 metres, Phou Khe is one of the ultra prominent peaks of Southeast Asia.

== See also ==
- List of ultras of Southeast Asia
- List of mountains in Thailand
- Nan Province
