= Mae Koeng Waterfalls =

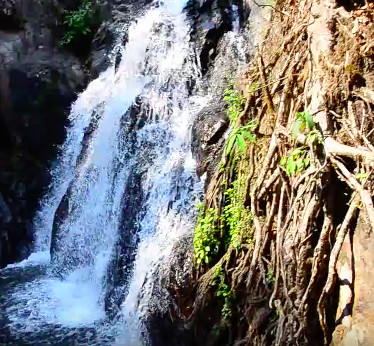
The Grand Mae Koeng

Mae Koeng Waterfalls (Thai: น้ำตกแม่เกิ๋ง) are a part of Wiang ko sai National Park in Northern Thailand, Wang chin District of Phrae province and Mae tha, Toen, Sop prab District of Lampang Province.

== Description ==
Mae Koeng is a large waterfall. The water flows all years. Water flows terracing resemble like a step from Mae Koeng mountain. The word "Mae Koeng" is a dialect language, meaning "steps of a ladder". There are 7 levels of waterfall. You can see the water route in a middle of mountain. The grand Mae Koeng is away from the office about 1 kilometer and the little Mae Koeng walk about 2 kilometers from the office. Distance from layer 1 to layer 7 is approximately 200 meter. Mae Koeng waterfalls has a climbing route which allows people to visit the elegant waterfalls. Some of the levels have fresh basins for swimming. Both the grand Mae Koeng and the little Mae Koeng flow down into the Yom river at Sop Koeng, Wang chin District.

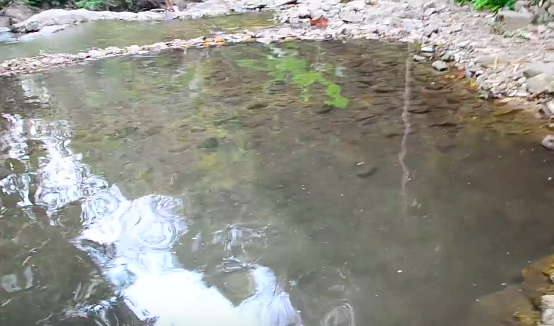
Fresh basins

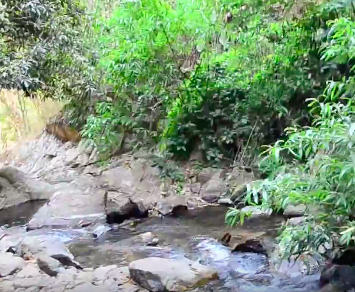
The Little Mae Koeng

== Location ==
The location of Mae Koeng Waterfalls are Wiang ko sai National Park, Moo 7, Mae koeng, Wang chin District, Phrae Province and cover in Lampang Province.

== Facilities ==
Mae Koeng Waterfalls have 3 facilities, such as Official residence services, Convenient footpath for walk into a waterfall, Environment camping. And route to the waterfalls from Phrae Province follow 1023 highway, pass Long District and 11 square highway at Mae kam, approximately kilometer's 74 at Wiang kosai National Park, about 1 kilometer to office of Mae Koeng Waterfalls.
