= Luang Prabang Range =

Mountain range in northwestern Laos and northern Thailand

- ทิวเขาหลวงพระบาง
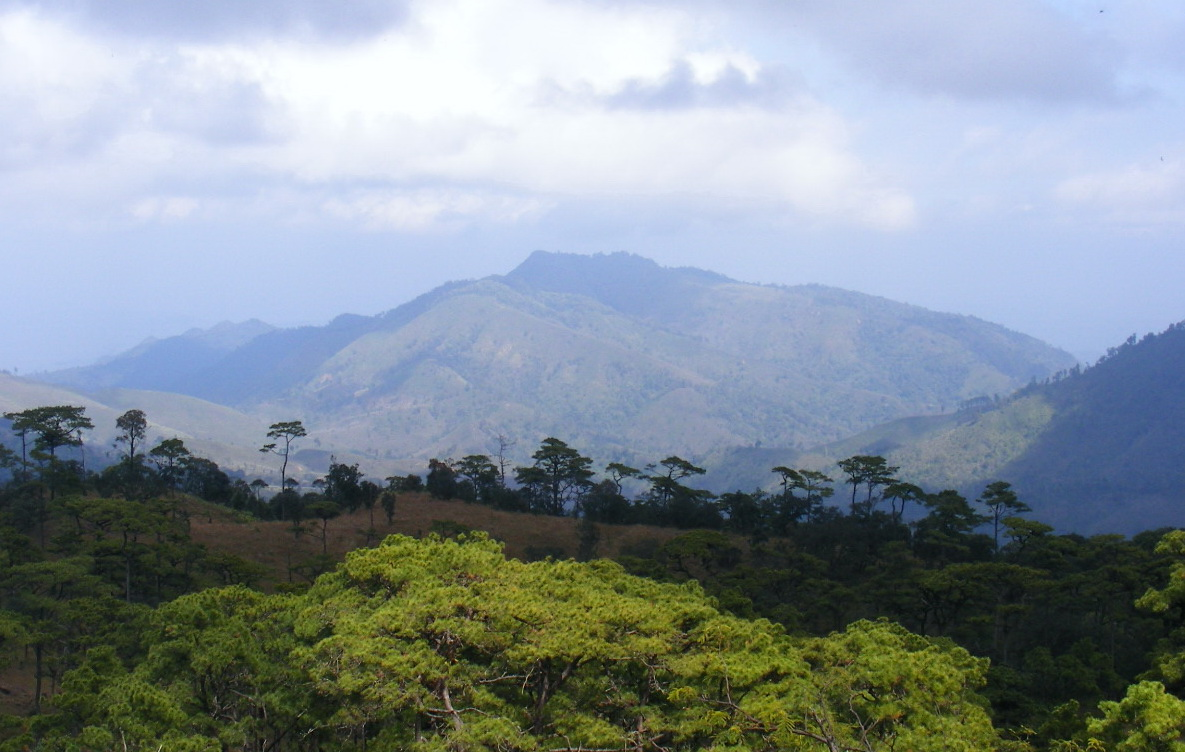
- Noen 1428 (Hill no. 1428), the battlefield of the Thai–Laotian Border War of 1988; view from Phu Soi Dao National Park, Phitsanulok Province, Thailand

Highest point
- Peak: Phu Soi Dao
- Elevation: 2,120 m (6,960 ft)
- Coordinates: 18°35′16″N 98°29′13″E

Dimensions
- Length: 280 km (170 mi) N/S
- Width: 85 km (53 mi) E/W

Geography
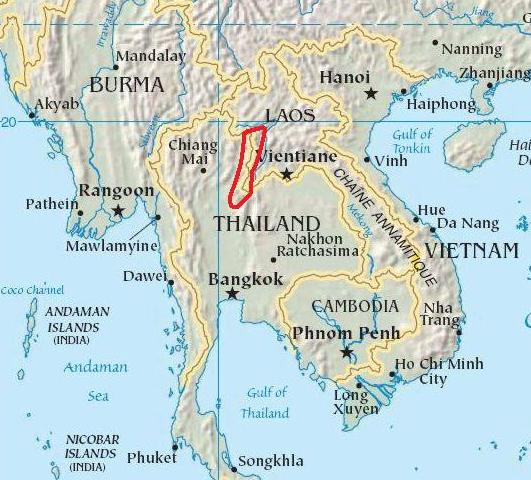
- Location of the Luang Prabang Range in Southeast Asia
- Countries: Thailand and Laos

Geology
- Rock age: Triassic
- Rock type(s): granite and sandstone

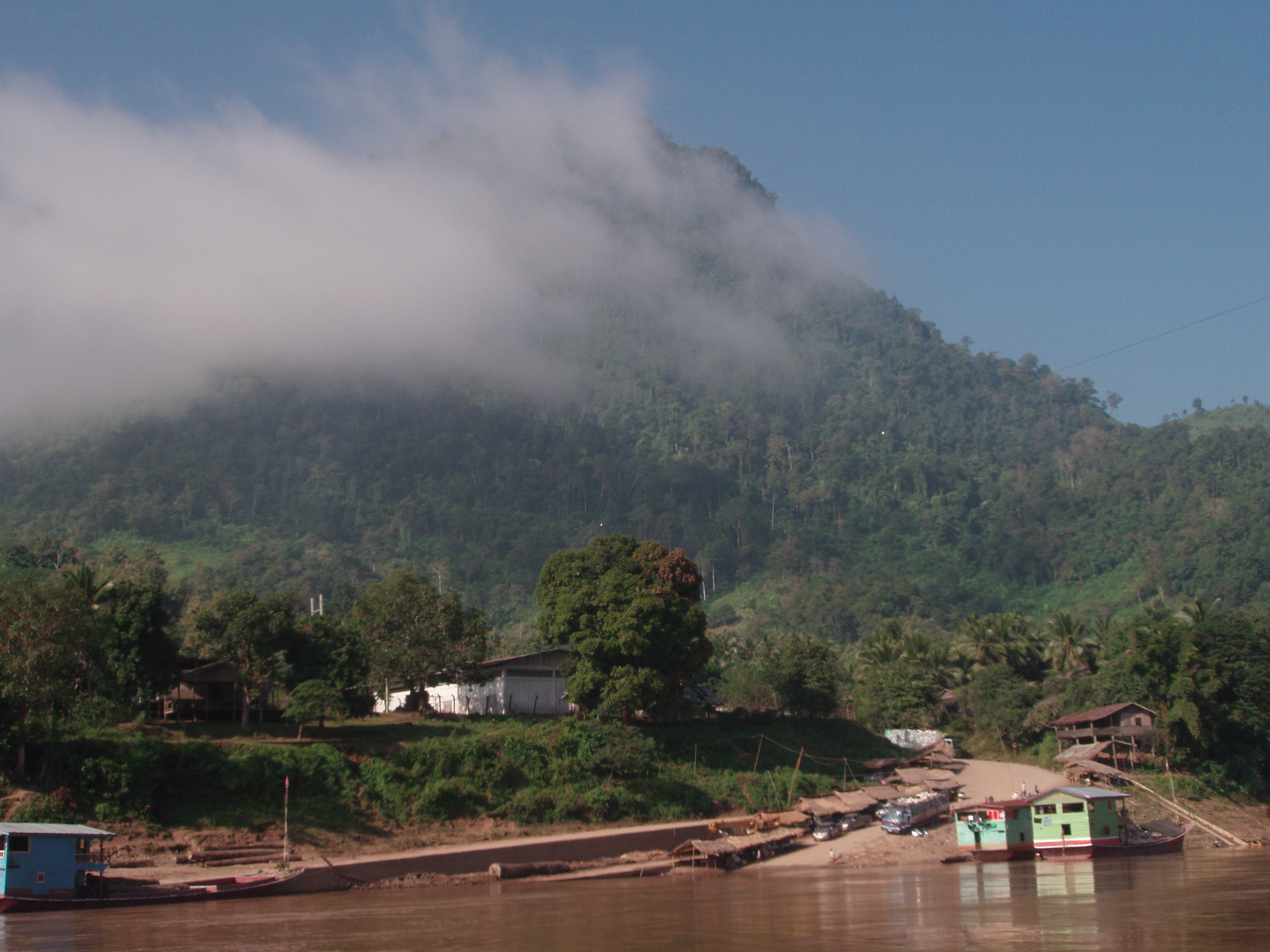
On the Laotian side, the mountains of the range reach the shores of the Mekong

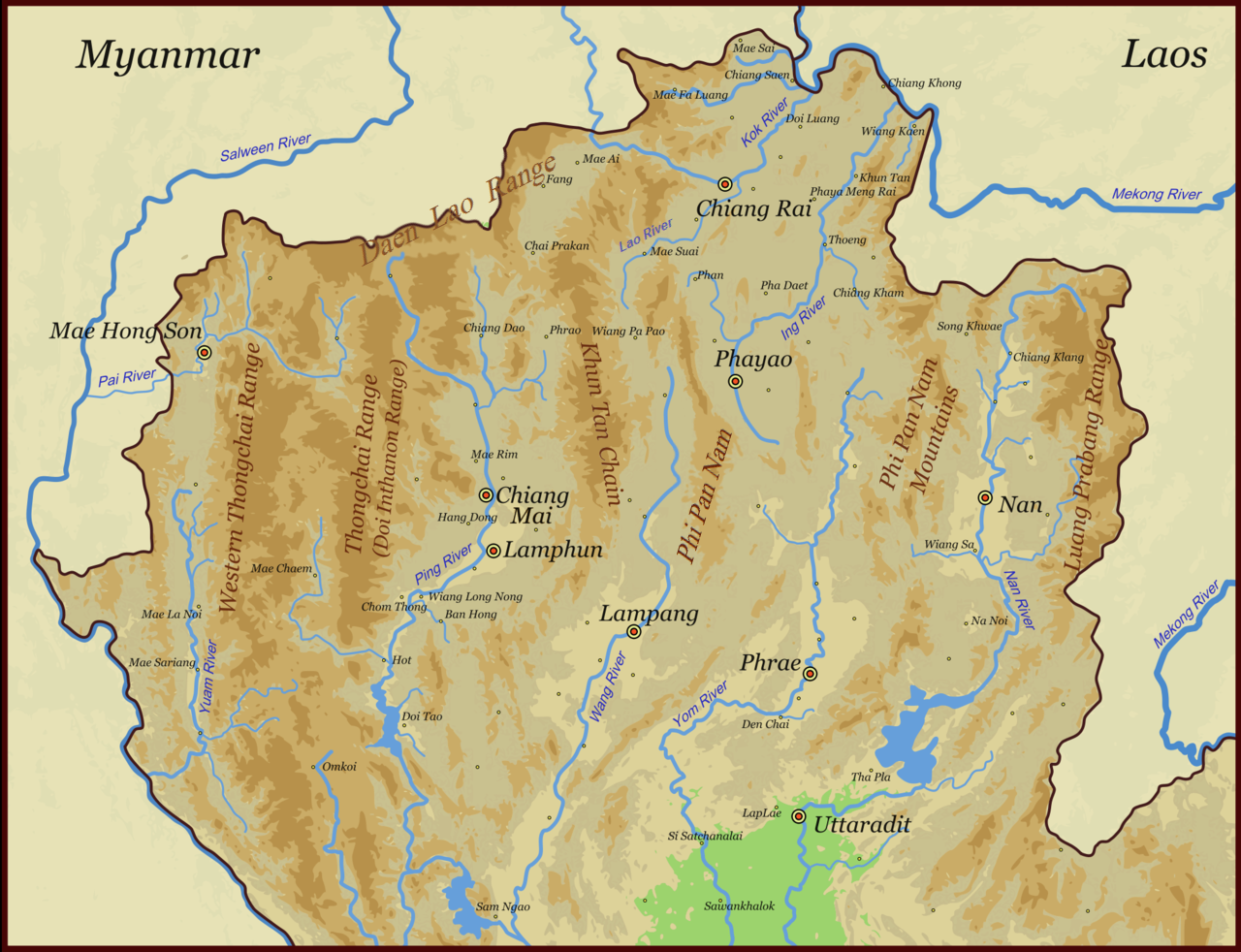
Map of the Thai highlands

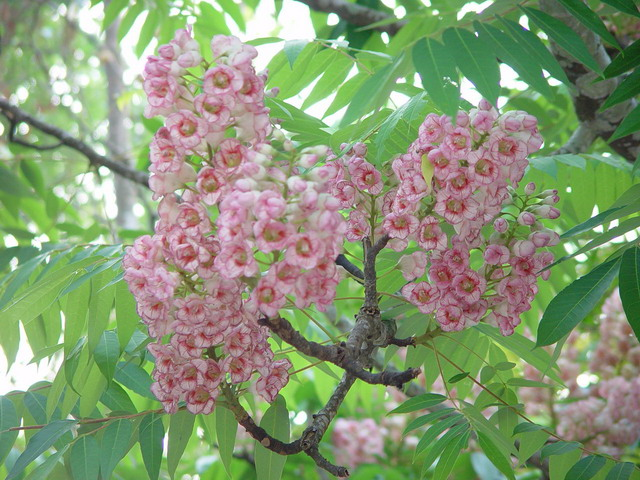
Bretschneidera sinensis (Thai: ชมพูภูคา Chompoo Phu Kha), a tree threatened by habitat loss that in Thailand is found only in this range

The Luang Prabang Range (Thai: ทิวเขาหลวงพระบาง, pronounced [tʰīw kʰǎw lǔaŋ pʰráʔ bāːŋ]), named after Luang Prabang, is a mountain range straddling northwestern Laos and Northern Thailand. Most of the range is located in Sainyabuli Province (Laos), as well as Nan and Uttaradit Provinces (Thailand), with small parts in Phitsanulok and Loei Provinces. Several rivers such as the Nan, Pua and Wa rivers, have their sources in this range. Phu Fa waterfall, the biggest and the tallest waterfall in Nan Province, is also located in these mountains. This range is part of the Luang Prabang montane rain forests ecoregion.

Geologically its composition is similar to that of the parallel Khun Tan Range and the Phi Pan Nam Range, both located further west.

== Geography ==
The Luang Prabang mountains are the easternmost range of the Thai highlands. The range runs roughly in a North/South direction between the Mekong and the Nan River. Its northern end begins in the area of Hongsa District, a stretch in Laos near Luang Prabang where the Mekong River flows from west to east; its southern end is about 260 km further south, at the western end of Loei Province in Thailand where the Phetchabun Mountains begin. The highest point of the range is 2,120 m high Phu Soi Dao. Other high peaks of the Luang Prabang Range are 2,079 m high Phu Khe, 1,980 m high Doi Phu Kha, 1,837 m high Doi Phu Wae and 1,745 m high Doi Phi Pan Nam; Phu Khe is one of the ultra prominent peaks of Southeast Asia. Many of the important peaks are located at the border.

The vegetation is evergreen hill forest on the highest altitudes of the range height and mostly dry deciduous forest below 1,000 m, with an abundance of teak trees, which has led to heavy deforestation. Like in most ranges of the area, a great proportion of the original forest cover has disappeared owing to shifting agricultural practices and illegal logging. The area is allegedly a heartland for military involvement in timber trade.

The Luang Prabang Range is practically devoid of vehicle roads on the Sainyabuli Province side, where there is only one north-south route extending from Sainyabuli, the provincial capital, to the Thai border opposite Thailand's Loei Province.

== History ==
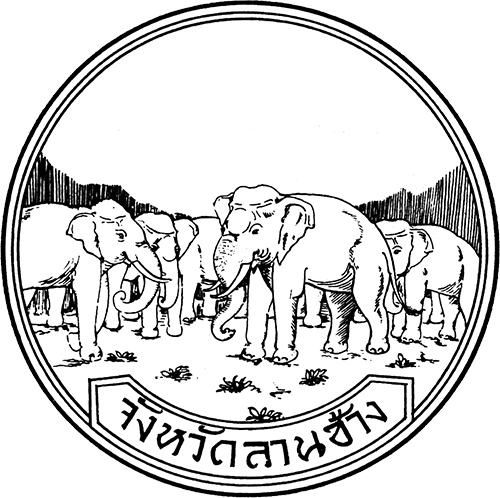
Seal of Lan Chang Province (1941-45)

In 1904 the Laotian area of the range was ceded from Siam to the French Indochina colony. Following the Franco-Thai War in 1941 it was annexed by Thailand again under the name Lan Chang (Million Elephants) Province, but returned to its pre-war status in 1946 following the 1946 Washington Accord.

Certain Hill tribe communities live in the range, like the Khmu and the Hmong, whose tribal villages are located on both sides of the mountain range. Since the Mekong isolated Sainyabuli from other Laotian provinces with Hmong villages, the warfare during the Quiet War which so badly affected other Hmong communities in Laos largely did not affect the Hmong in the Luang Prabang Range. Most Hmong villages in Sainyabuli Province did not see any fighting. However, later they were persecuted all the same by the Vietnamese and the Pathet Lao soldiers, who regarded them as traitors, thus many fled across the border. There are refugee camps on the Thai side of the range.

The southern part of the range saw some confrontation between December 1987 and February 1988 when Thai and Laotian forces engaged in cross-border fighting. Known as Thai–Laotian Border War, this short conflict was caused by a dispute involving the map made by French surveyors in 1907 to mark the borders between Siam and French Indochina. The Thai-Lao Joint Boundary Commission (JBC) was established in 1996 to clarify the 1,810-kilometre boundary and settle ownership of the disputed villages. Border demarcation is still going on.

Yetis are said to have been spotted in the remote Mae Charim area of the range.

== Tourism ==
Presently on the Thai side of the Luang Prabang Range some of the Hmong communities are regularly visited by organized tourist groups. River Wa is a popular river for white water rafting between July and December.

== Protected areas ==
There are large swathes of protected areas on the Thai side of the Luang Prabang Range. On the Lao side there is only one.

=== In Laos ===
The Nam Phouy National Biodiversity Conservation Area, a large protected area in Laos home to many wild elephants, is located in a forested sector close to the Thai border. The projected reservoir of Lower Nam Phoun dam, however, is partly within the Nam Phouy NBCA and a large zone of the protected area will be flooded in the future.

=== In Thailand ===
Khun Nan National Park, Doi Phu Kha National Park, Sinan National Park, Mae Charim National Park, Na Haeo National Park, Klong Tron National Park, Phu Suan Sai National Park and Phu Soi Dao National Park are located on the Thai side of the Luang Prabang Range. Phu Miang-Phu Thong Wildlife Sanctuary is another protected area on the Thai side.

== See also ==
- Deforestation in Laos
- Deforestation in Thailand
- Sainyabuli Province
- Thai highlands
- Southeast Asian Massif
- Khokmanh
- Ban Yang
- Ban Thapene
