= Phae Mueang Phi =

Rock formation in Thailand

- Rock formation
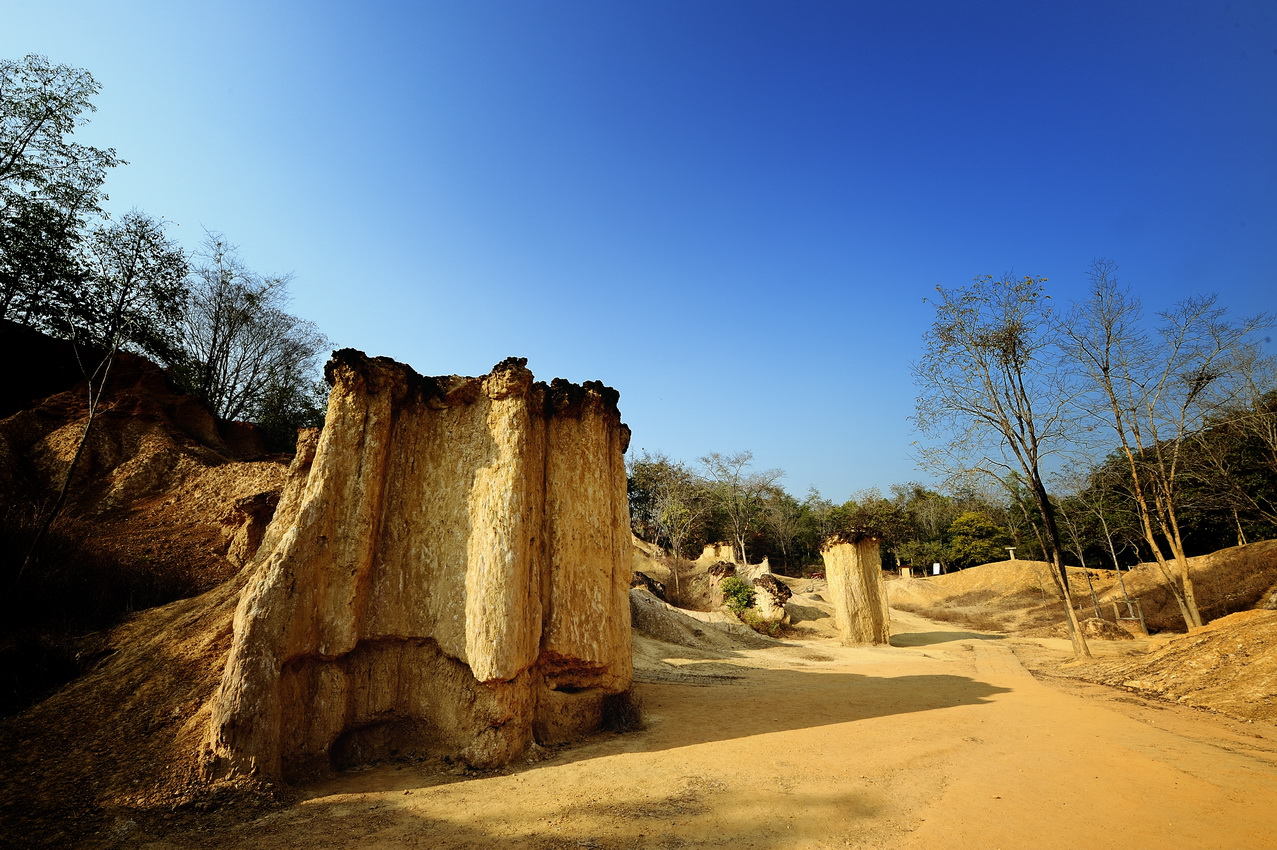

- Location within Thailand
- Coordinates: 18°11′07″N 100°12′38″E
- Location: Phrae, Thailand

Area
  - Total: 0.27 km²

Phae Mueang Phi (Thai: แพะเมืองผี, pronounced [pʰɛ́ʔ mɯ̄a̯ŋ pʰǐː]) is a place with original rock formations in the Phi Pan Nam Range, Thailand. It is about eight kilometres northeast of Phrae town in Mueang Phrae District, Phrae Province.

Named after the local ghosts (ผี), the zone of Phae Mueang Phi includes mushroom rocks and distinctive pillars shaped by natural erosive action.

The term Phae Mueang Phi is northern expression meaning 'ghost town grove' because the terrain is otherworldly.

== Protected area ==
Phae Mueang Phi Forest Park is a small protected area covering the site that was established on 8 March 1981. The name "forest park" is a category, for there is no forest as such at the site except for a few scattered trees. The protected zone covers an area of 0.27 km^{2}.

== See also ==
- List of rock formations
