= Doi Pha Klong National Park =

National park in Thailand

- IUCN category II (national park)

- Park location in Thailand
- Location: Thailand
- Nearest city: Phrae
- Coordinates: 18.16°N 100.00°E
- Area: 182 km^{2} (70 sq mi)
- Established: 2007
- Governing body: Department of National Parks, Wildlife and Plant Conservation

Doi Pha Klong National Park is a national park in Phrae province, Thailand. The park is home to mountains, caves and rock formations.

== Geography ==
Protected areas of Phrae province

Doi Pha Klong National Park is in Long, Sung Men and Mueang districts of Phrae province. The park headquarters is about 20 km (12 mi) west of the provincial capital Phrae. The park's total area is 182 km^{2} (70 sq mi). It is a source of tributaries of the Yom River.

== Attractions ==
The park's limestone geology makes for rock formations such as Suan Hin Maharat and the coral reef-like Khao Hin Pakarang. Erawan Cave is 200 m (660 ft) deep and features stalagmites and stalactites.

== Flora and fauna ==
The park is home to deciduous and dipterocarp forests. Species include Lagerstroemia calyculata, Dipterocarpus obtusifolius, Dipterocarpus tuberculatus, Shorea obtusa, Dalbergia oliveri, Hopea odorata, Wrightia arborea, Spondias bipinnata and Millettia brandisiana.

Park animals include serow, wild boar, cobra, muntjac, lesser oriental chevrotain, civet, Kloss's mole and northern treeshrew. Birds in the park include crested serpent eagle, greater flameback, white-rumped shama, scaly-breasted munia and coucal.
