= Lam Nam Nan Fang Khwa Wildlife Sanctuary =

Wildlife sanctuary in Northern Thailand

- เขตรักษาพันธุ์สัตว์ป่าลำน้ำน่านฝั่งขวา
- IUCN category IV (habitat/species management area)
- Location within Thailand
- Location: Uttaradit Province and Phrae Province, Thailand
- Coordinates: 17.76°N 100.48°E
- Area: 235 km^{2} (91 sq mi)
- Established: 2000
- Governing body: Department of National Parks, Wildlife and Plant Conservation

Lam Nam Nan Fang Khwa Wildlife Sanctuary (Thai: เขตรักษาพันธุ์สัตว์ป่าลำน้ำน่านฝั่งขวา) is a wildlife sanctuary in Northern Thailand, located across Uttaradit Province and Phrae Province.

== Geography ==
The sanctuary covers an area of approximately 235 km² (91 sq mi). It features a highly mountainous terrain forming part of the range dividing Phrae and Uttaradit provinces, with its highest peak being Khao Phraya Pho reaching 1,447 metres above sea level. The watershed area within the sanctuary serves as an important source feeding the Yom River on the Phrae side and the Sirikit Dam reservoir on the Nan River basin side.

The protected area borders the Lam Nam Nan National Park to its east. It is accessible via Thailand Route 11, which passes near the Khao Phlueng Viewpoint, a local tourist landscape managed within the sanctuary's boundaries.

== Ecology ==
Managed by the Protected Areas Regional Office 13 (Phrae), the sanctuary's dense forests consist primarily of mixed deciduous, dry evergreen, and deciduous dipterocarp woodlands. Periodic biological field surveys conducted by the Ministry of Natural Resources and Environment monitor the biodiversity in key sectors like the Huai Mae Man forest.

The sanctuary serves as an ecological habitat for approximately 34 mammalian species, 58 bird species, and various reptiles. Notably, it acts as a critical refuge for vulnerable or endangered fauna including the Asian black bear, mainland serow, and Kitti's hog-nosed bat.

== History ==
The sanctuary was formally established by royal decree on 11 October 2000, separating the land from surrounding national reserved forests including the Mae Phuak, Pa Mae Chua, Pa Huai Kiang Pha, and Lam Nam Nan Fang Khwa forests. The establishment was initially pushed forward via inter-provincial forestry survey initiatives to counteract illegal logging trends within the border woodland tracts of Phrae and Uttaradit.
