= Mae Wa National Park =

National park in Thailand

- อุทยานแห่งชาติแม่วะ
- IUCN category II (national park)
- Location within Thailand
- Location: Thailand
- Nearest city: Tak
- Coordinates: 17°22′19″N 99°15′32″E
- Area: 582 km^{2} (225 sq mi)
- Established: 17 November 2000
- Visitors: 5,878 (in 2019)
- Governing body: Department of National Parks, Wildlife and Plant Conservation

Mae Wa National Park (Thai: อุทยานแห่งชาติแม่วะ) is a national park in Thailand's Lampang and Tak provinces. This mountainous park features scenic mountain viewpoints, waterfalls and caves.

== Geography ==
Mae Wa National Park is located about 60 kilometres (40 mi) north of Tak in the Thoen and Mae Phrik districts of Lampang Province and the Sam Ngao and Ban Tak districts of Tak Province. The park's area is 364,173 rai ~ 582 square kilometres (225 sq mi). The northern section of the park consists of high mountains while the central and southern sections consist of a high mountain plain.

== Attractions ==
The park namesake Mae Wa waterfall is a 12-level waterfall originating from Doi Prae Luang mountain and whose waters eventually join the Wang River.

The park features numerous cave systems including Tham Phra Chedi, notable for hosting a pagoda-shaped stalagmite, and Tham Nampha Pha Ngam, a large cave also featuring stalagmites and stalactites.

== Flora and fauna ==
The park features numerous forest types, including deciduous, deciduous dipterocarp, evergreen and coniferous forest. Tree species include Burmese ebony, Lagerstroemia calyculata, Dalbergia oliveri, Afzelia xylocarpa, Takian, Anisoptera costata, Shorea obtusa, Shorea siamensis, Dipterocarpus obtusifolius, Tenasserim pine, and Khasi pine.

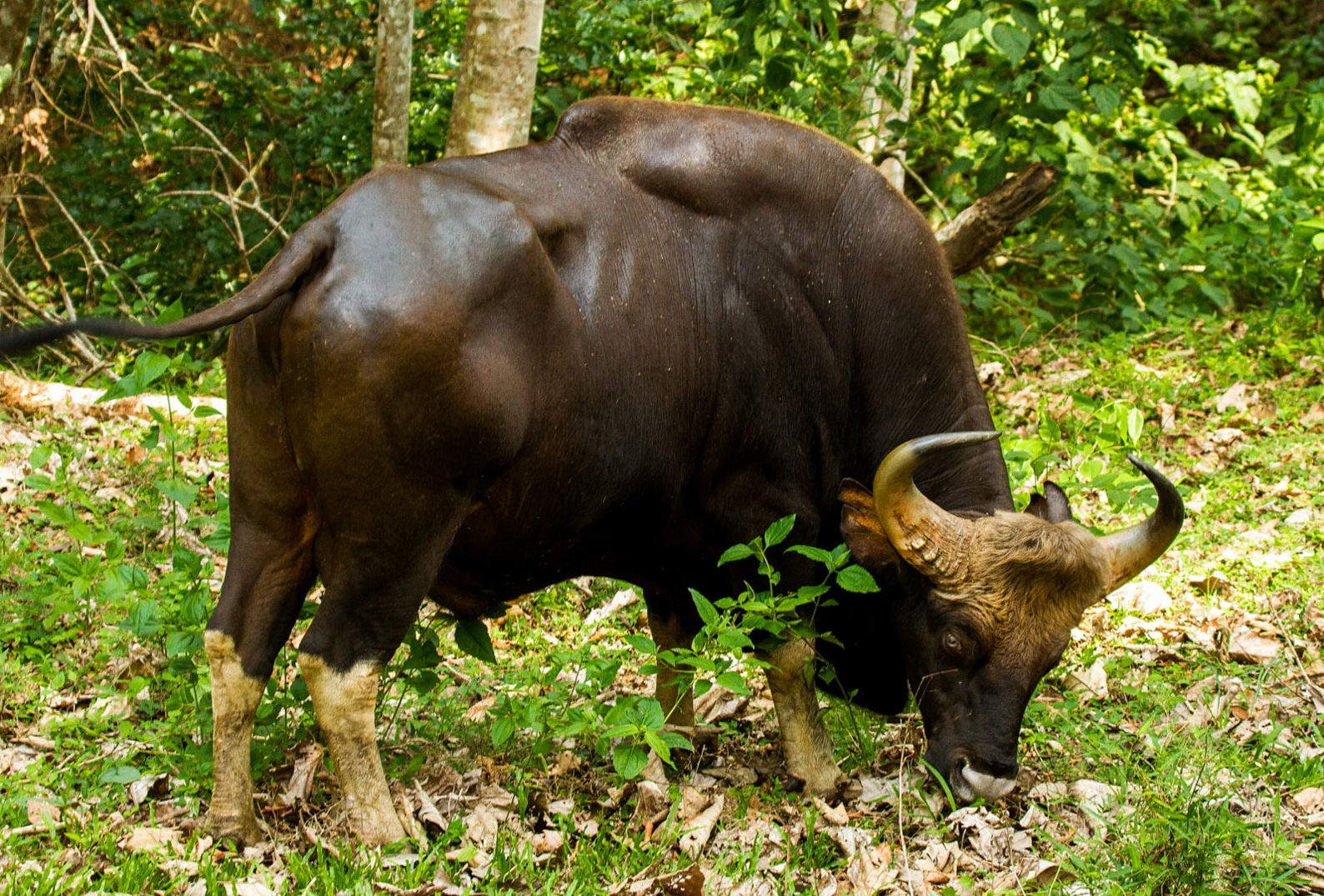
Gaur

Animals in the park include tiger, gaur, Asiatic black bear, sambar deer, barking deer, wild boar, Siamese hare and civet.

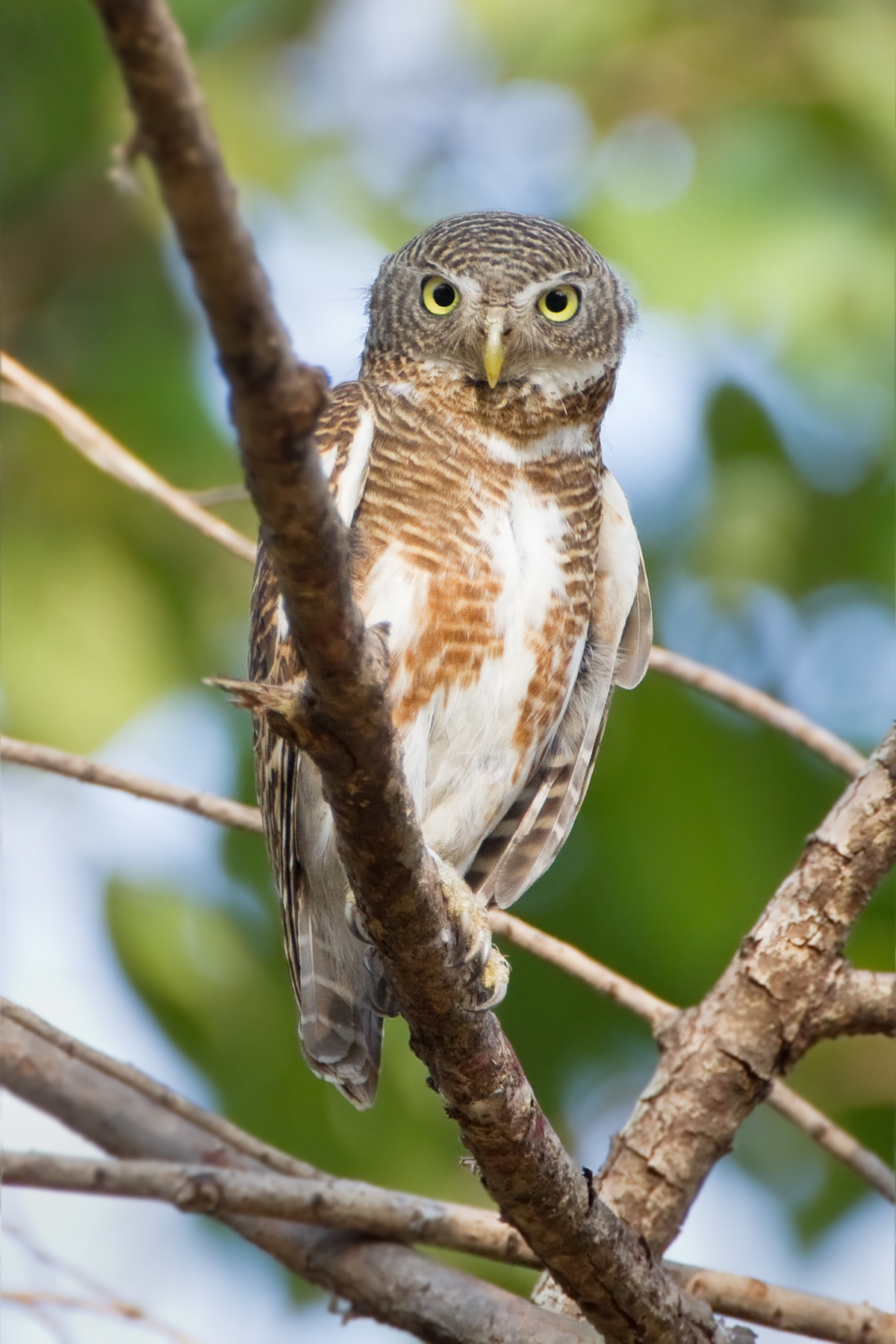
Asian barred owlet

Bird life includes Asian barred owlet and coucal.

== Location ==
Mae Wa National Park in overview PARO 13 (Lampang branch)

5) Mae Wa National Park in overview PARO 13 (Lampang branch)

	National park
1	Chae Son
2	Doi Chong
3	Doi Khun Tan
4	Khelang Banphot
5	Mae Wa
6	Tham Pha Thai

	Wildlife sanctuary
7	Doi Pha Mueang
	Non-hunting area
8	Doi Phra Bat
9	Mae Mai

	Forest park
10	Mon Phraya Chae

== See also ==
- List of national parks of Thailand
- DNP - Mae Wa National Park
- List of Protected Areas Regional Offices of Thailand
