= Chae Son National Park =

National park in Lampang Province, Thailand

- อุทยานแห่งชาติแจ้ซ้อน
- IUCN category II (national park)
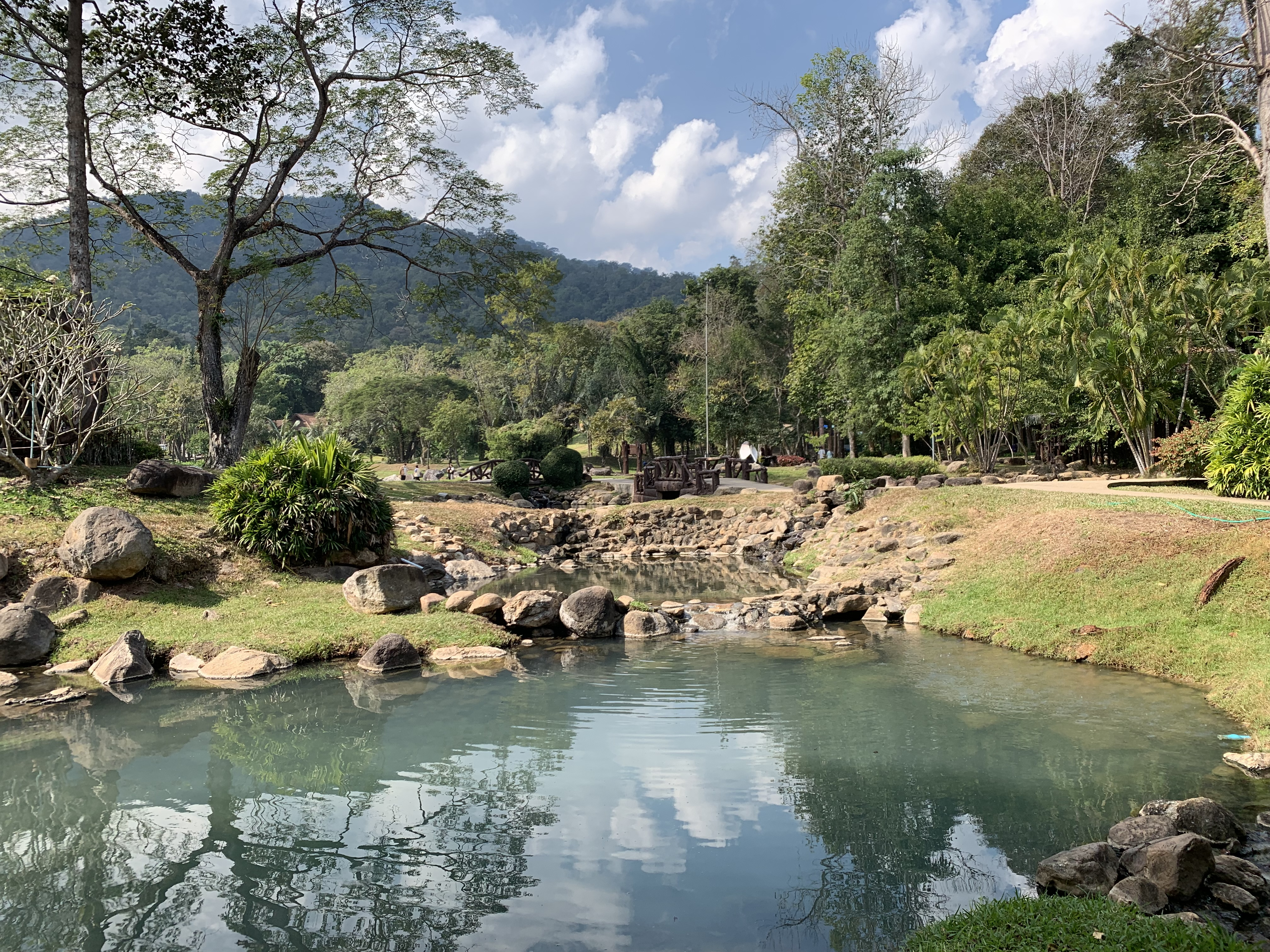
- A hot spring in the national park
- Interactive map of Chae Son National Park
- Location: Lampang Province, Thailand
- Nearest city: Lampang
- Coordinates: 18°50′11″N 99°28′14″E
- Area: 768 km^{2} (297 sq mi)
- Established: 28 July 1988
- Visitors: 248,381 (in 2019)
- Governing body: Department of National Park, Wildlife and Plant Conservation (DNP)

Chae Son National Park (Thai: อุทยานแห่งชาติแจ้ซ้อน) is a national park in Lampang Province, Thailand. Home to the namesake Chae Son waterfall, the park is also host to caves and hot springs.

== Geography ==
Chae Son National Park is located 75 kilometres (47 mi) north of Lampang town in Mueang Pan and Chae Hom districts. The park's area is 480,000 rai ~ 768 square kilometres (297 sq mi). Park mountains form part of the Khun Tan Range and are an important water source for the surrounding area. In places the park reaches elevations of 2,000 metres (6,600 ft).

== History ==
Originally a Forest Park, on 28 July 1988 Chae Son was designated Thailand's 58th National Park.

== Attractions ==
The park's main attraction is Chae Son Waterfall, a six-tiered waterfall 150 metres (490 ft) in height. Mae Peak is a three-tiered waterfall 100 metres (330 ft) in height. Other waterfalls include Mae Koon, also 100 metres (330 ft), and Mae Mawn.

Chae Son hot spring is an area of sulfurous pools from nine boreholes emitting waters at temperatures around 73 °C (163 °F). The park also has numerous cave systems including Pha-ngam, Mor, Luang and Loug Kae.

== Flora and fauna ==
The park's forests are mixed deciduous and deciduous dipterocarp. Tree species include Afzelia xylocarpa, Chukrasia velutina, Toona ciliata, Diospyros, Lagerstroemia calyculata, Dipterocarpus alatus, Dipterocarpus obtusifolius, Pinus latteri, Pinus kesiya, Pterocarpus macrocarpus, Shorea obtusa and Shorea siamensis.

Animals in the park include Phayre's leaf monkey, sambar deer, Asian golden cat, Southwest China serow, northern red muntjac (Muntiacus muntjak vaginalis), chevrotain, Siamese hare, Sunda flying lemur, Malayan porcupine, Finlayson's squirrel, wild boar and northern treeshrew.

Bird life in Chae Son includes white-rumped shama, red junglefowl, woodpecker, bulbul, barbet, tailorbird, green pigeon, warbler, babbler and dove.

== Location ==
Chae Son National Park in overview PARO 13 (Lampang branch)

1) Chae Son National Park in overview PARO 13 (Lampang)

	National park
1	Chae Son
2	Doi Chong
3	Doi Khun Tan
4	Khelang Banphot
5	Mae Wa
6	Tham Pha Thai

	Wildlife sanctuary
7	Doi Pha Mueang
	Non-hunting area
8	Doi Phra Bat
9	Mae Mai

	Forest park
10	Mon Phraya Chae

== See also ==
- List of national parks of Thailand
- DNP - Chae Son National Park
- List of Protected Areas Regional Offices of Thailand
