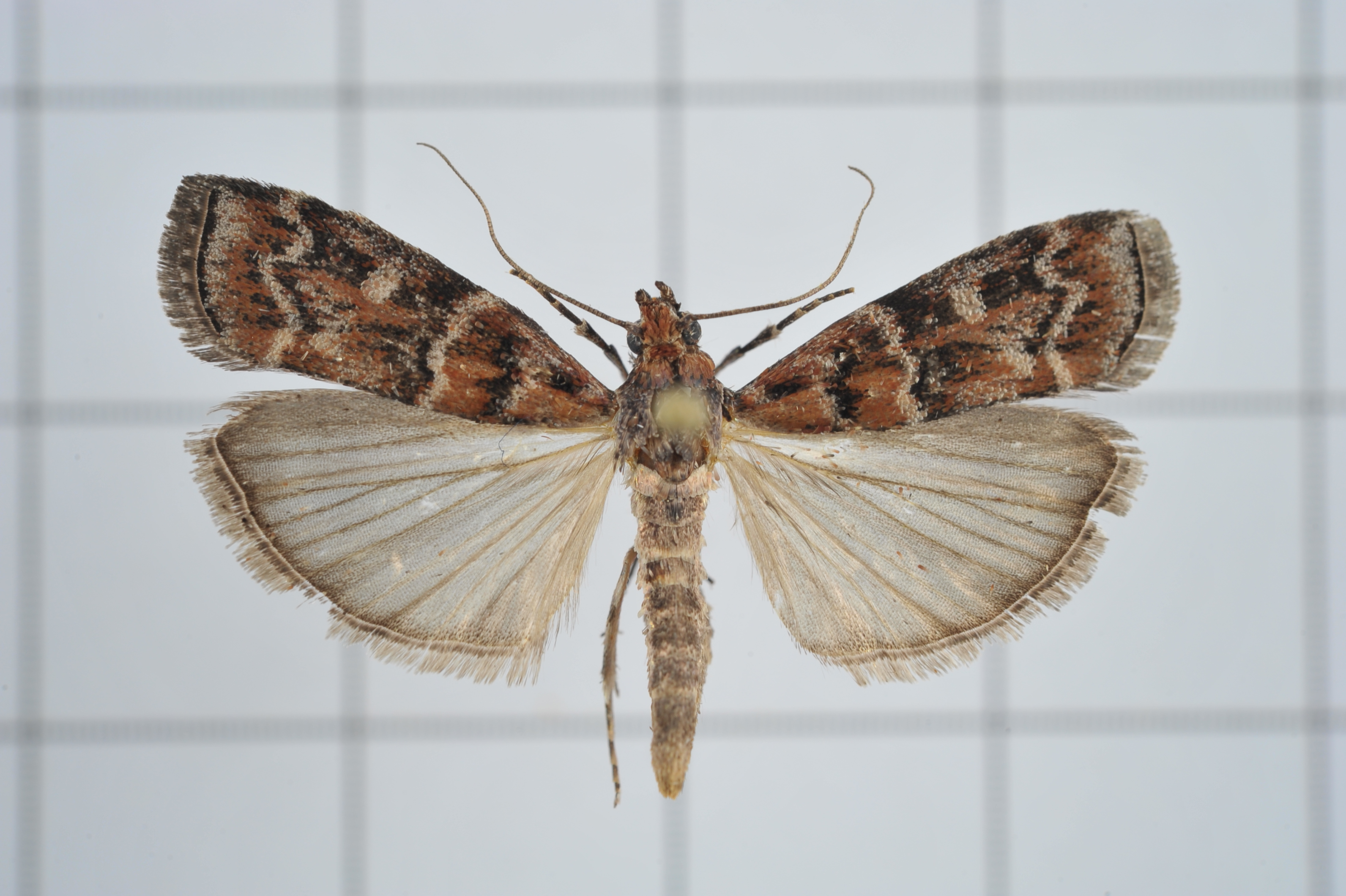

Scientific classification
- Kingdom: Animalia
- Phylum: Arthropoda
- Class: Insecta
- Order: Lepidoptera
- Family: Pyralidae
- Genus: Dioryctria
- Species: D. rubella

Binomial name
- Dioryctria rubella Hampson in Ragonot, 1891

= Dioryctria rubella =

Species of moth

Dioryctria rubella, the pine shoot moth, is a species of snout moth in the genus Dioryctria. It was described by George Hampson in 1891 and is known from south-east Asia, including China and the Philippines.

The larvae have been recorded feeding on Pinus kesiya, Pinus merkusii, Pinus caribaea, Pinus taeda, Pinus yunnanensis and Pinus massoniana.
