= Doi Khun Tan National Park =

National park of Thailand

Doi Khun Than National Park
- IUCN category II (national park)
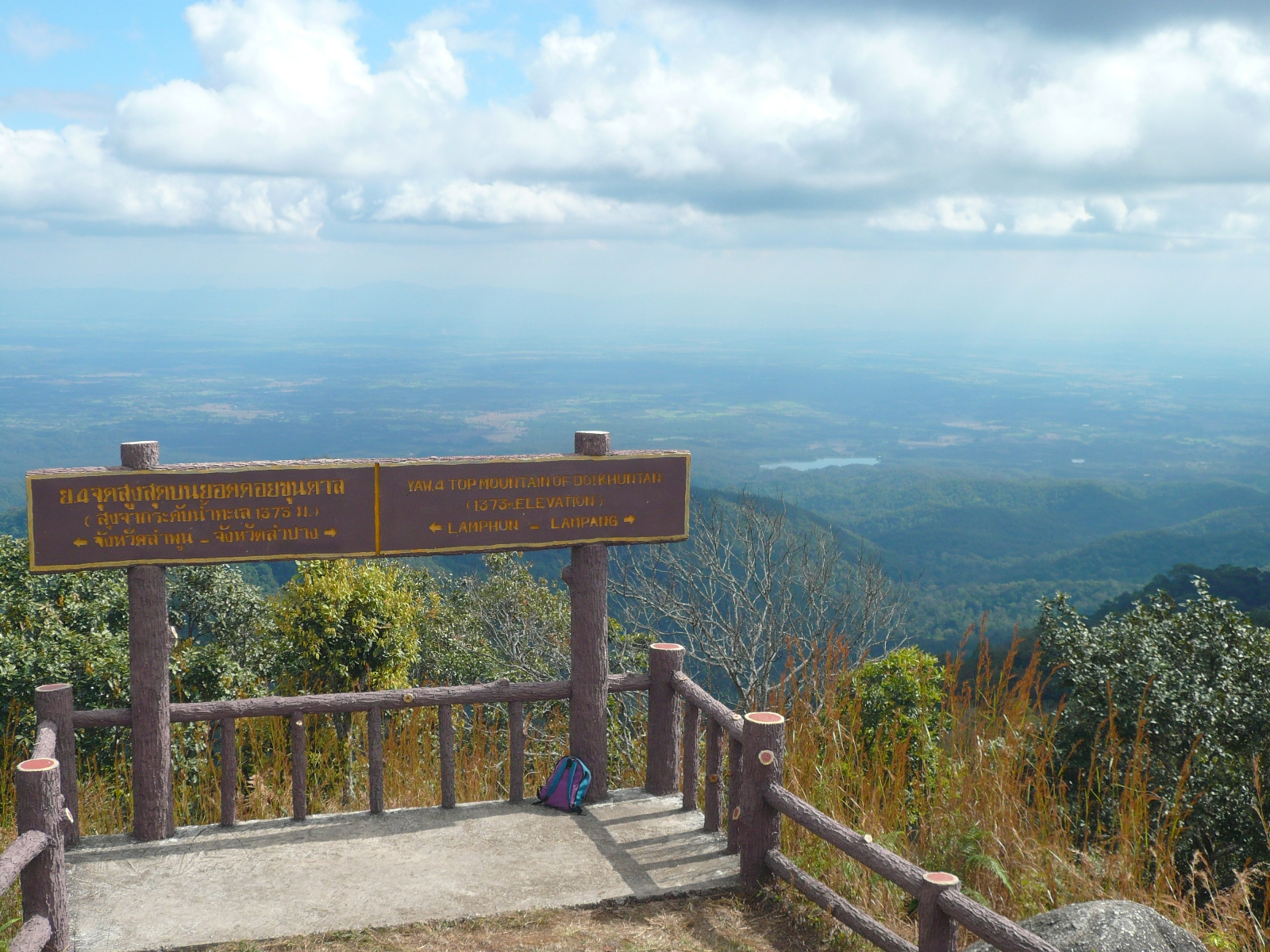
- At Doi Khun Tan peak

- Location within Thailand
- Location: Thailand
- Nearest city: Lampang
- Coordinates: 18°28′15″N 99°17′5″E
- Area: 255 km^{2} (98 sq mi)
- Established: 1975

Doi Khun Tan National Park (Thai: อุทยานแห่งชาติดอยขุนตาล) straddles the mountainous area of the Khun Tan Range in Lamphun and Lampang Provinces, northern Thailand.

Established in 1975 as Thailand's tenth national park, it is an IUCN Category V protected area measuring 159,556 rai ~ 255 square kilometres (98 sq mi). The park ranges in elevation from 325–1,373 m.

Its best known feature is Thailand's longest railroad tunnel, 1,352 m long.

== Climate ==
The three basic seasons are summer, from March–June; rainy season, from July–October; and winter, from November–February. The temperature varies from 38 degrees Celsius during the hot season to as cold as 5 degrees Celsius. Rainfall, which falls mostly during the rainy season, averages about 1,034 mm per year.

== Flora and fauna ==
Human encroachment has disturbed the forests of Doi Khun Tan and they have changed dramatically in the past century. The forests can be divided into three types, with distinct elevation ranges.

Lowland elevations (325–850 m). Originally a teak forest, lower elevations are composed of a degraded, mixed bamboo deciduous forest and deciduous Dipterocarp-oak forest.

Middle elevations (850-1,000 meter). This is a transitional area where the lowland deciduous forest and upland evergreen-pine forest mix to form a mixed evergreen and deciduous forest. There are only two species of pine trees in Thailand, a two–needle pine (Pinus latteri) and three-needle pine (Pinus kesiya), both of which can be found here.

Upland elevations (1,000-1,373 m). The forest here is composed mostly of evergreen hardwood trees and a minority of pine (Pinus latteri) to form an evergreen-pine forest. Much of the forest and watershed on the west side of the national park has been ravaged. More pristine conditions are found on the east side.

Doi Khun Tan offers year-round viewing of wild-flowers such as orchids and gingers. Doi Khun Tan is botanically very diverse, home to over 1,300 different vascular species. Numerous edible fungi are found in the park.

Some wildlife still exists in Doi Khun Tan, including the Siamese hare, porcupine, wild chicken, wild boar and weasel, as a variety of birds, reptiles, spiders and insects. The effects of hunting, logging, frequent fires, and human encroachment have greatly reduced their numbers. In the past, gibbons, tiger, elephants, bears, wild cattle, serow, slow loris, barking deer and many other species were also residents of Doi Khun Tan. Now they are all gone.

== Location ==
Doi Khun Tan National Park in overview PARO 13 (Lampang branch)

3) Doi Khun Tan National Park in overview PARO 13 (Lampang)

	National park
1	Chae Son
2	Doi Chong
3	Doi Khun Tan
4	Khelang Banphot
5	Mae Wa
6	Tham Pha Thai

	Wildlife sanctuary
7	Doi Pha Mueang
	Non-hunting area
8	Doi Phra Bat
9	Mae Mai

	Forest park
10	Mon Phraya Chae

== See also ==
- Khun Tan Tunnel
- Thai highlands
- List of national parks of Thailand
- DNP - Doi Khun Tan National Park
- List of Protected Areas Regional Offices of Thailand
