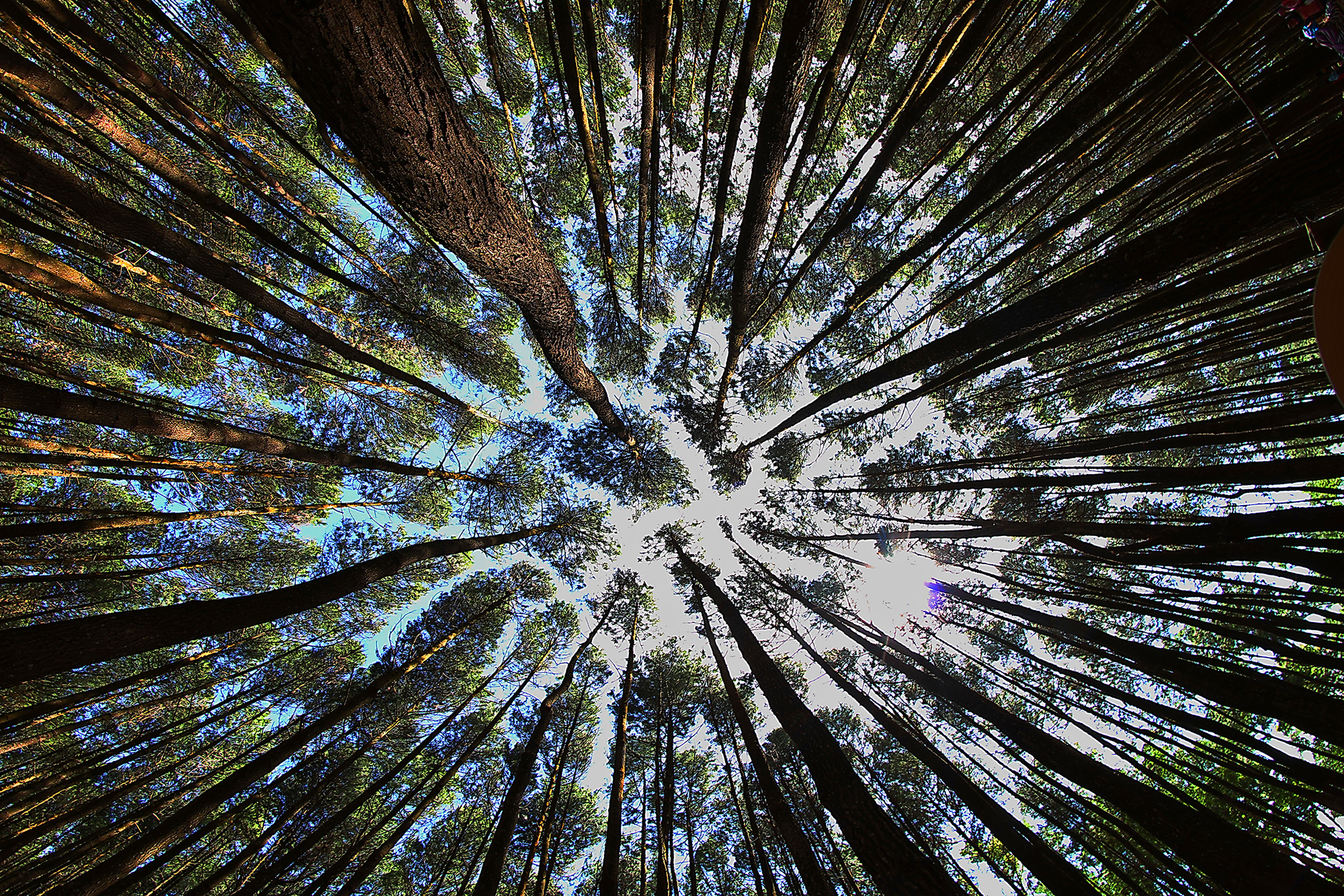

Conservation status
- Vulnerable (IUCN 3.1)

Scientific classification
- Kingdom: Plantae
- Clade: Tracheophytes
- Clade: Gymnosperms
- Division: Pinophyta
- Class: Pinopsida
- Order: Pinales
- Family: Pinaceae
- Genus: Pinus
- Subgenus: P. subg. Pinus
- Section: P. sect. Pinus
- Subsection: P. subsect. Pinus
- Species: P. merkusii

Binomial name
- Pinus merkusii Jungh. & de Vriese
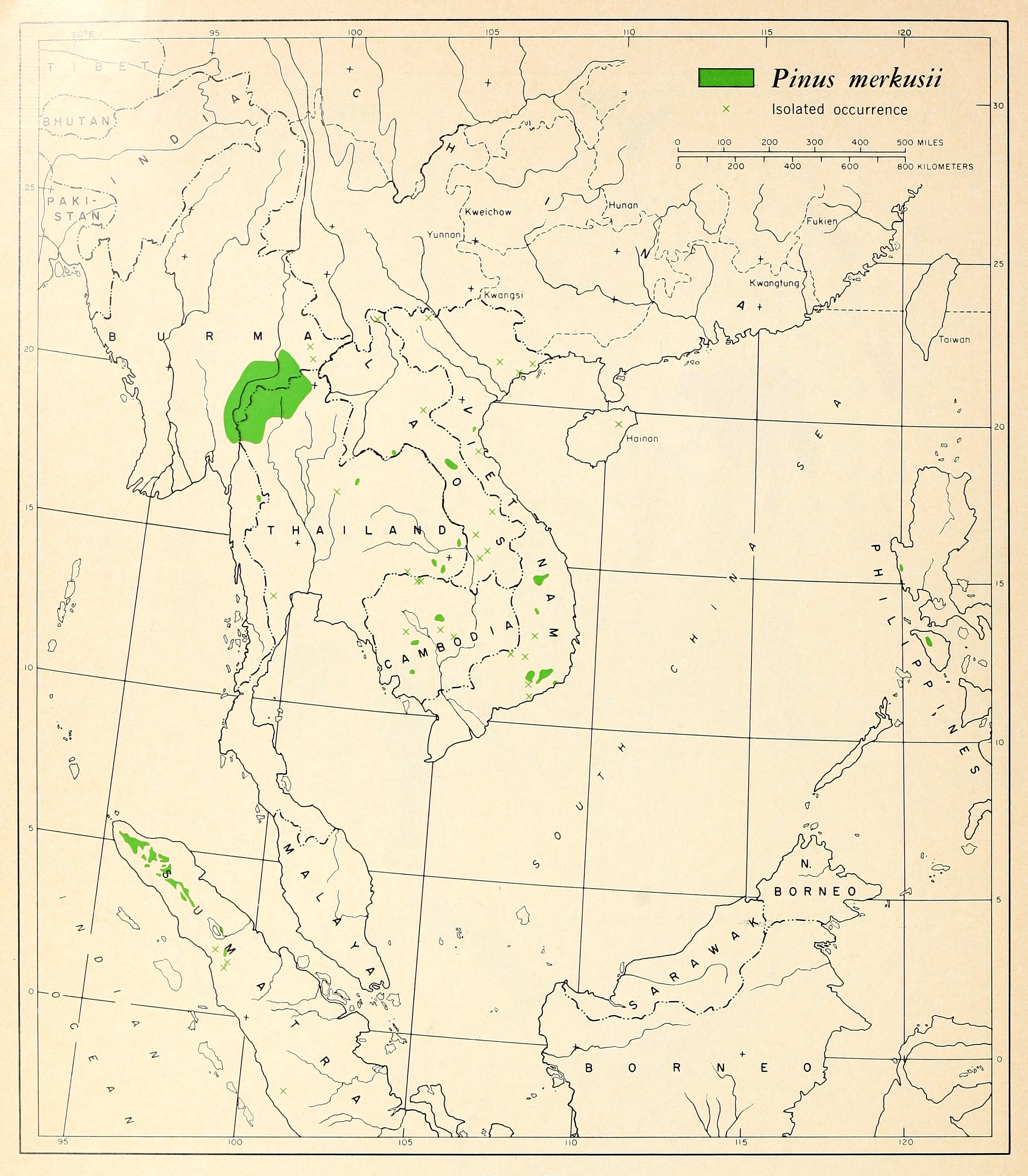
- Natural range of Pinus merkusii

= Pinus merkusii =

Species of conifer

Pinus merkusii, the Merkus pine or Sumatran pine, is a species of conifer in the family Pinaceae, a pine native to parts of southeast Asia, and the only member of its genus that occurs naturally south of the equator.

== Description ==
Pinus merkusii is a medium-sized to large tree, reaching 25–45 metres (80–150 feet) tall and with a trunk diameter of up to 1 m (3 ft 3 in). The bark is orange-red, thick and deeply fissured at the base of the trunk, and thin and flaky in the upper crown. The leaves ('needles') are in pairs, very slender, 15–20 centimetres (6–8 inches) long and less than 1 mm (1/32 in) thick, green to yellowish green.

The cones are narrow conic, 5–8 cm (2–3 1/4 in) long and 2 cm (3/4 in) broad at the base when closed, green at first, ripening glossy red-brown. They open to 4–5 cm (1 1/2–2 in) broad at maturity to release the seeds. The seeds are 5–6 mm (3/16–1/4 in) long, with a 15–20 mm (1/2–3/4 in) wing, and are wind-dispersed.

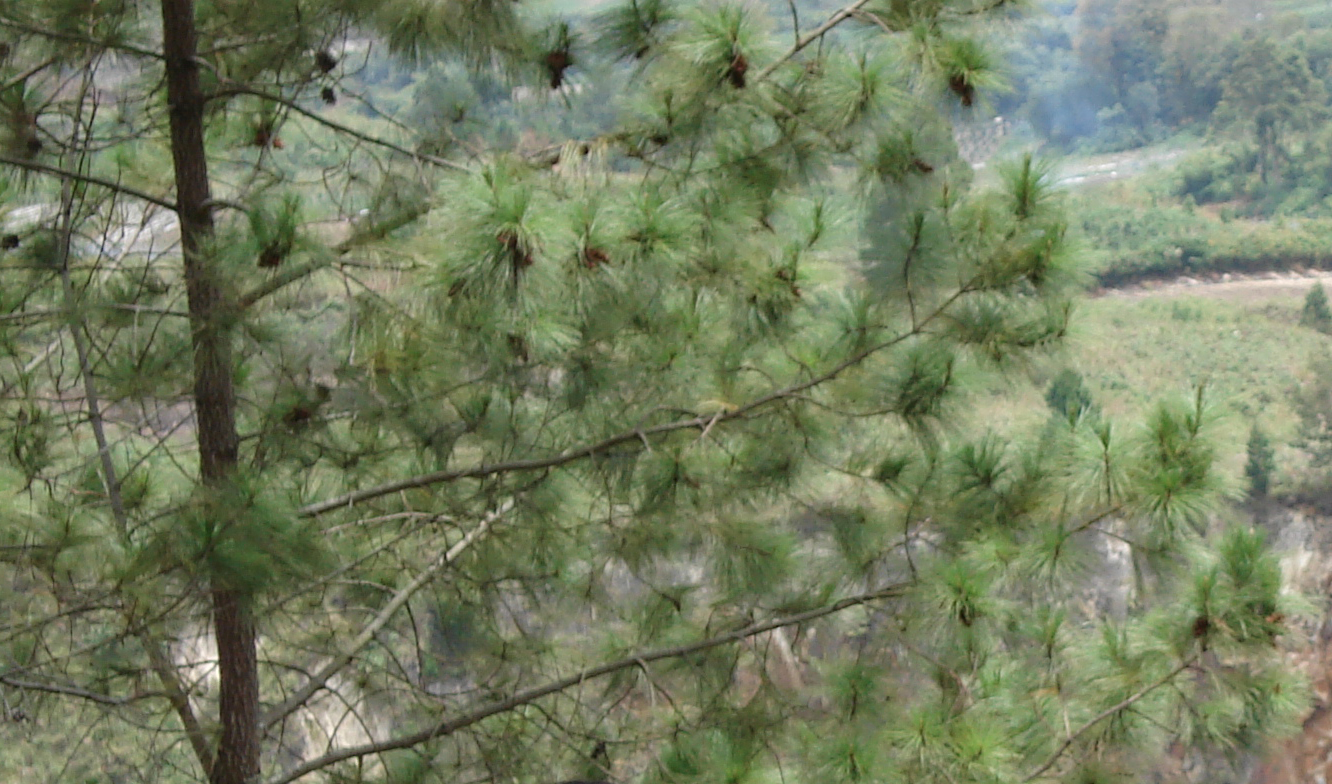
Branches with cones

=== Related species ===
Pinus merkusii is closely related to the Tenasserim pine (P. latteri), which occurs farther north in southeast Asia from Myanmar to Vietnam; some botanists treat the two as conspecific (under the name P. merkusii, which was described first), but P. latteri differs in longer (18–27 cm or 7–10 1/2 in) and stouter (over 1 mm or 1/32 in thick) leaves and larger cones with thicker scales, the cones often remaining closed for some time after maturity. It is also related to the group of Mediterranean pines including Aleppo pine and Turkish pine, which share many features with it.

== Distribution ==
It can be found mainly in Indonesia in the mountains of northern Sumatra, and with two outlying populations in central Sumatra on Mount Kerinci and Mount Talang, and in the Philippines on Mindoro and in the Zambales Mountains on western Luzon. Isolated populations of Pinus merkusii can be found in Mainland Southeast Asia, such as Kirirom National Park, on the Cardamom Mountains in Cambodia and Bidoup Núi Bà National Park on the Đà Lạt Plateau in Vietnam.

The population in central Sumatra, between 1° 40′ and 2° 06′ S latitude, is the only natural occurrence of any member of the Pinaceae south of the Equator. It generally occurs at moderate altitudes, mostly 400–1,500 m (1,300–4,900 ft), but occasionally as low as 90 m (300 ft) and up to 2,000 m (6,600 ft).
