= Lampang province =

Province of Thailand

Coordinates: 18°41′44.46″N 99°43′32.33″E

Lampang ลำปาง ᩃᩣᩴᨻᩣ᩠ᨦ
- Province
- จังหวัดลำปาง · ᨧᩢ᩠ᨦᩉ᩠ᩅᩢᨯᩃᩣᩴᨻᩣ᩠ᨦ
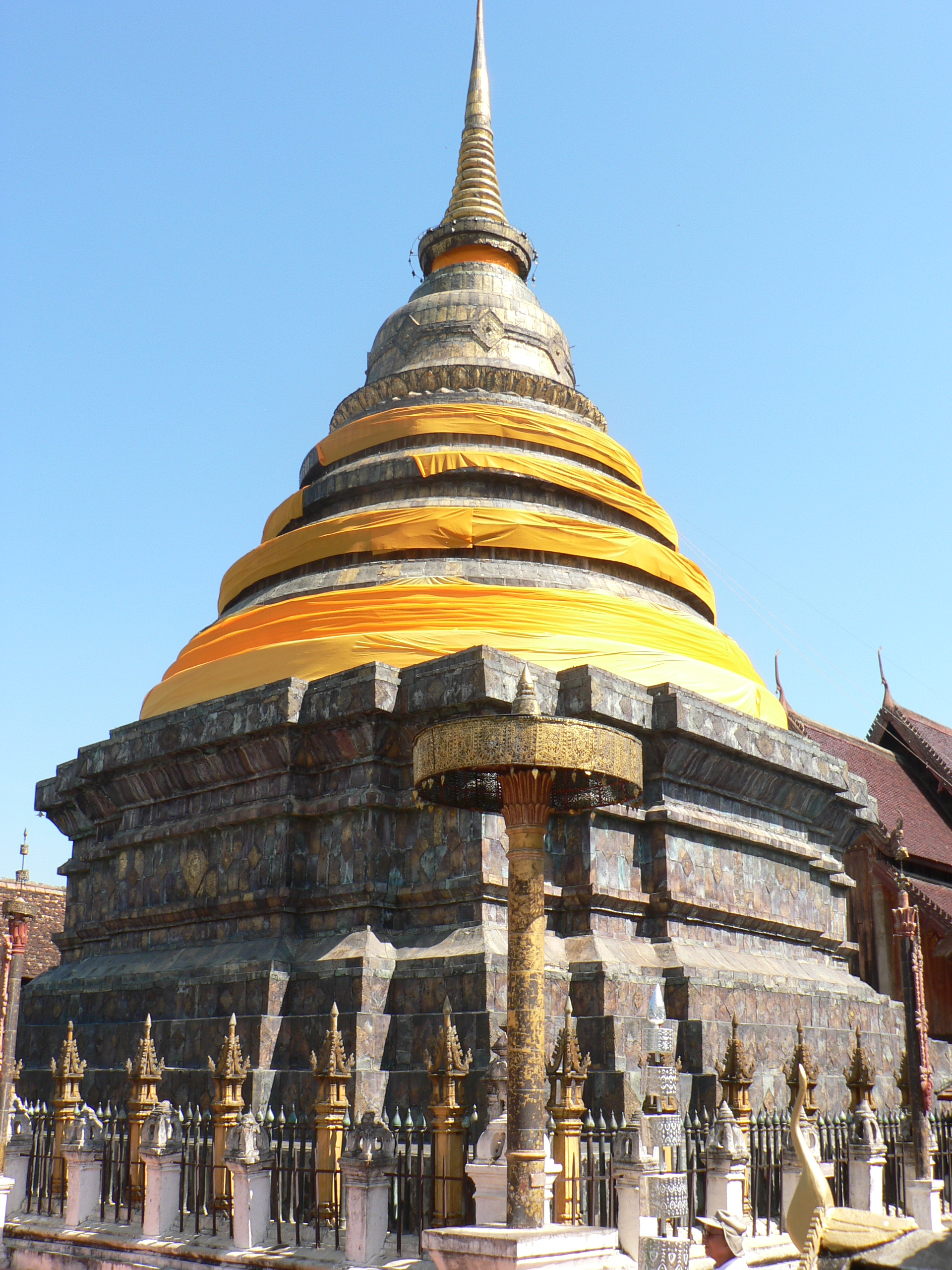
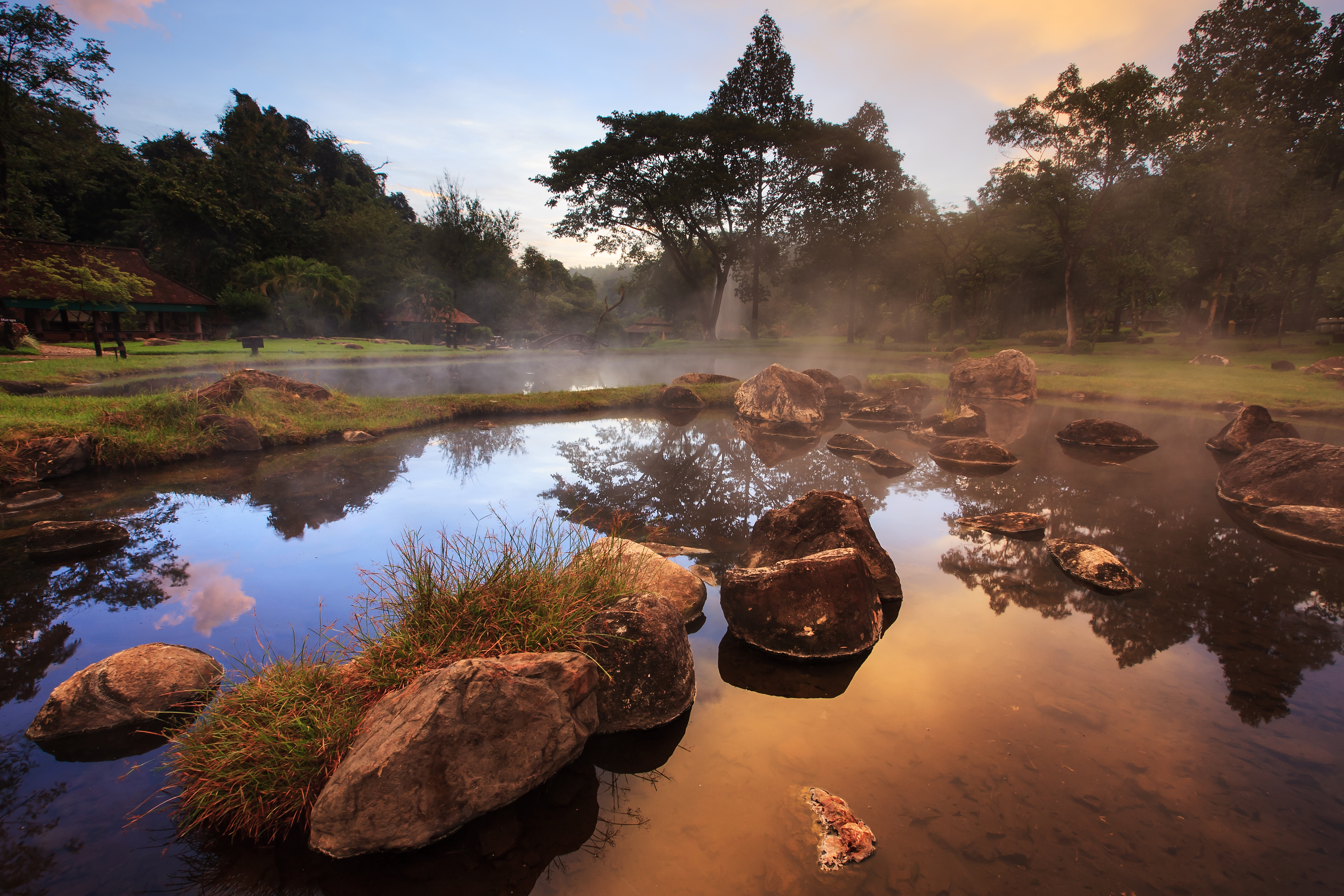
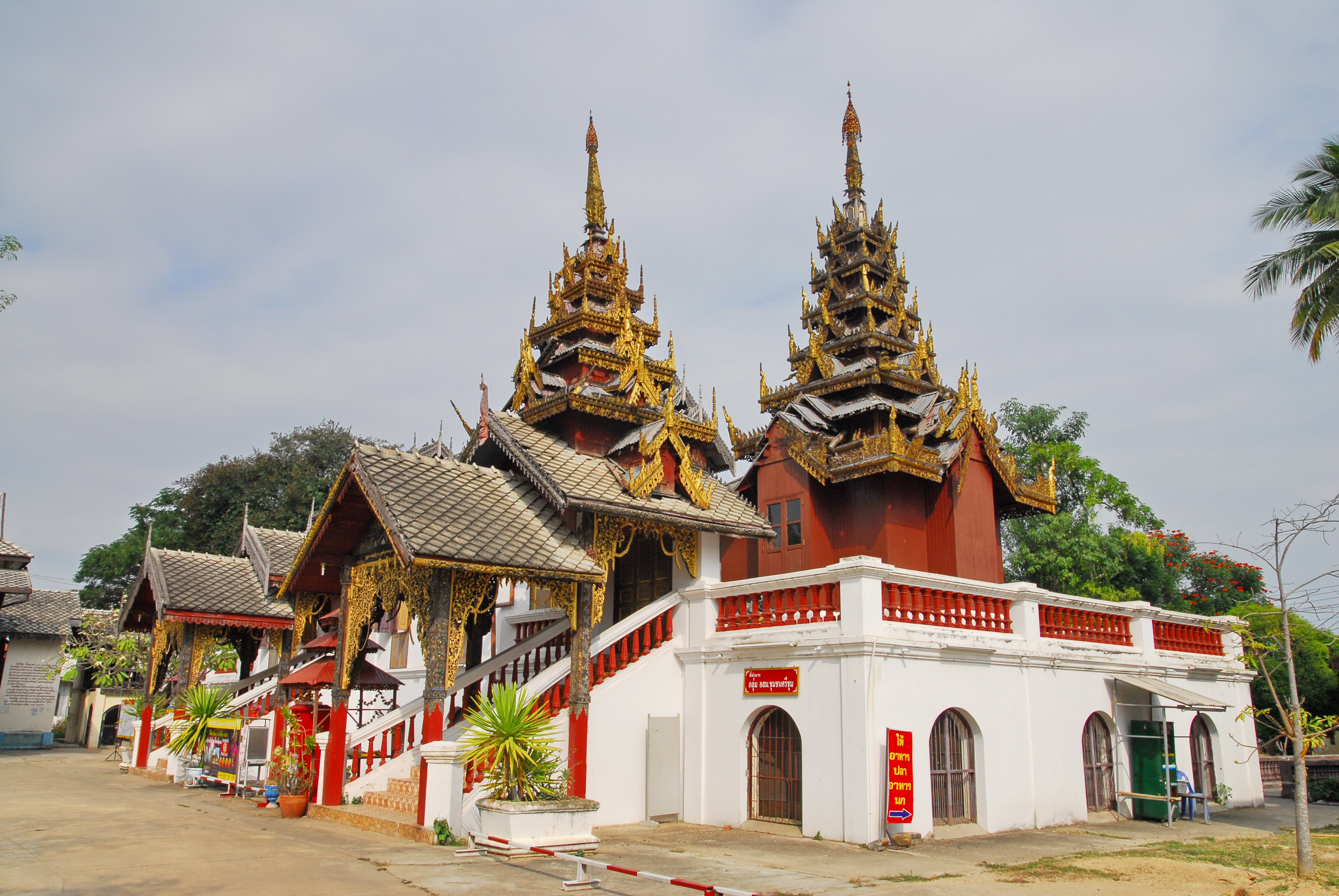
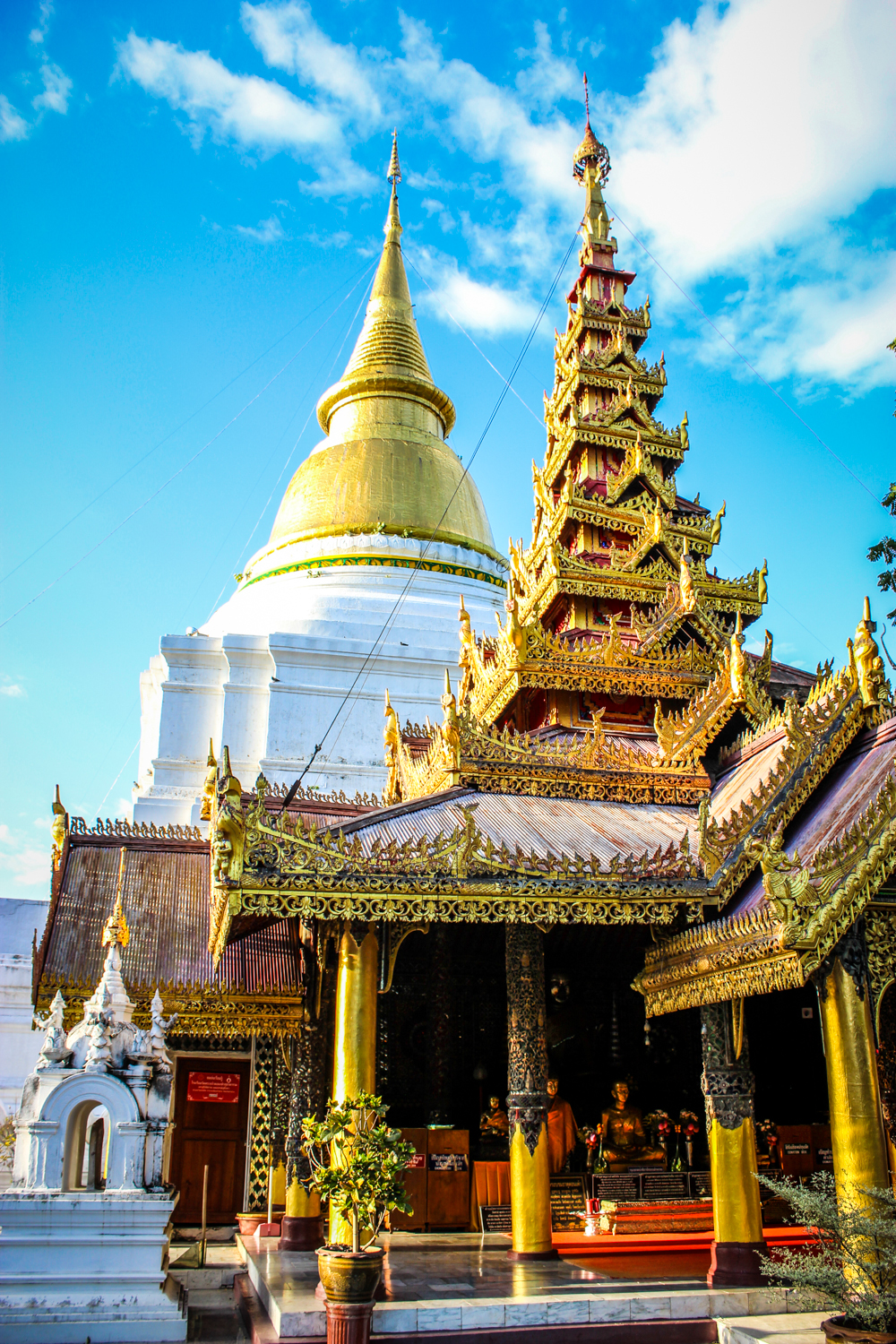
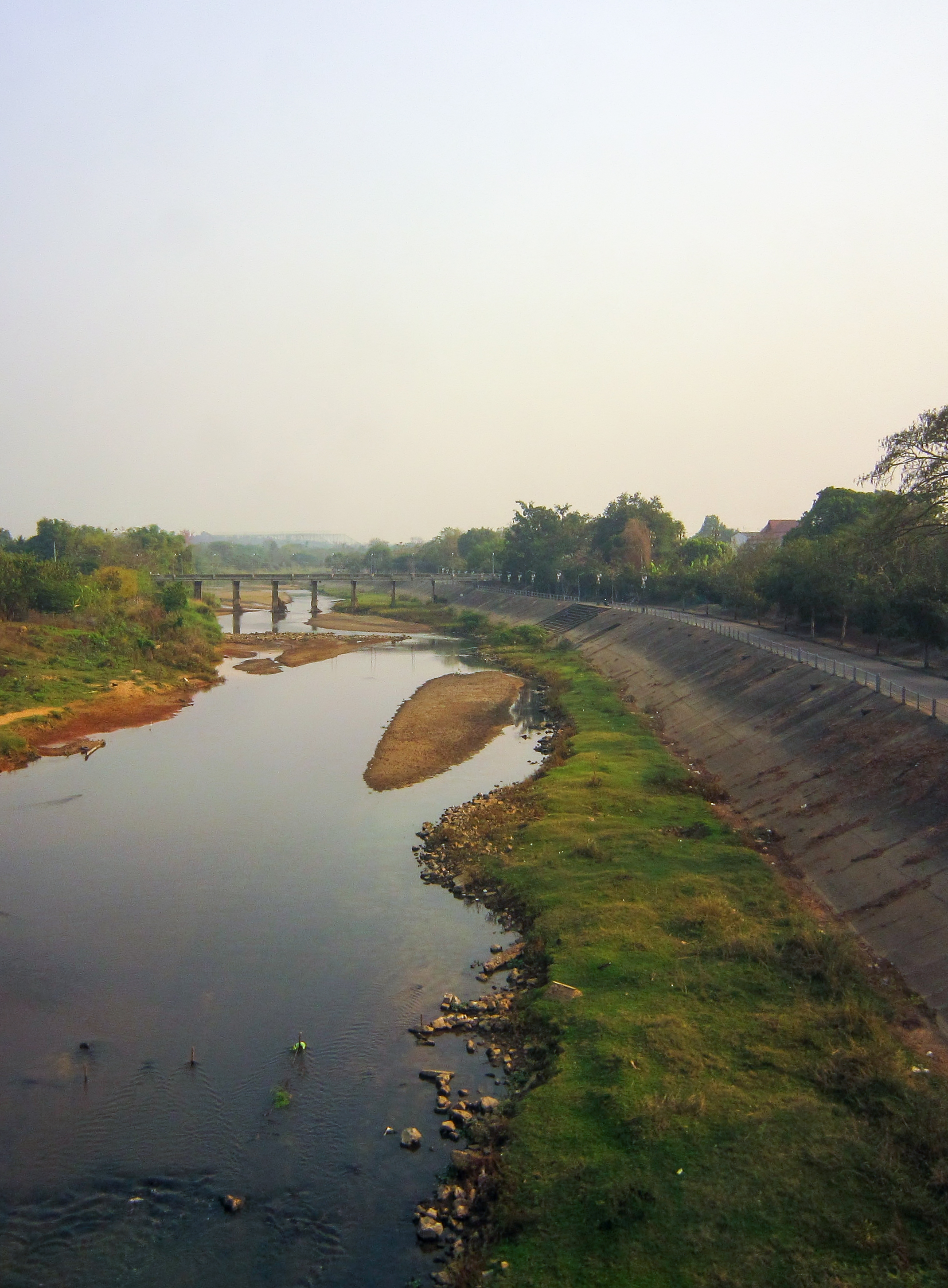
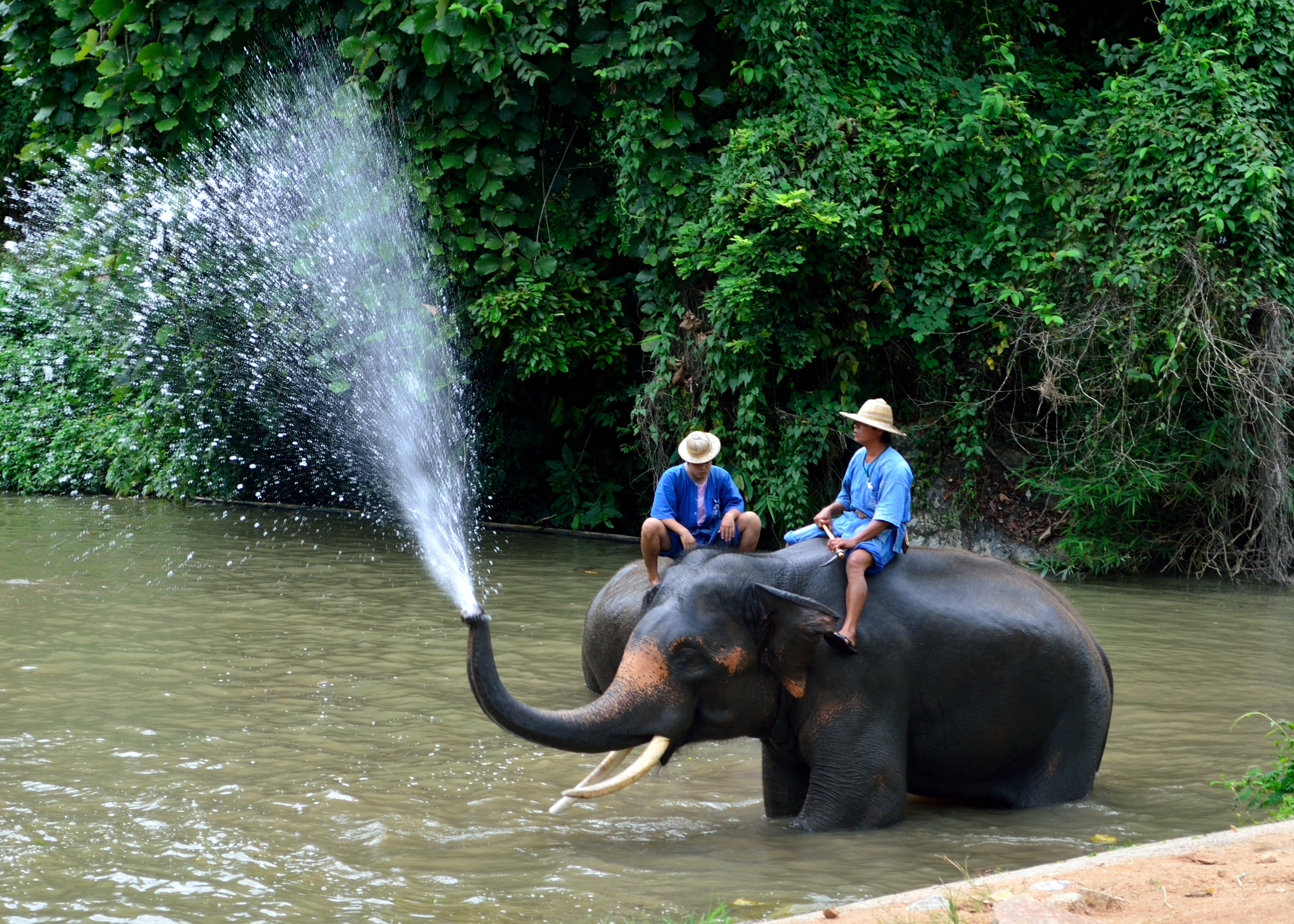
- From left to right, top to bottom : Wat Phra That Lampang Luang, Chae Son National Park, Wat Sri Chum, Wat Phra Kaeo Don Tao, Wang River, The Thai Elephant Conservation Center

- Flag Seal
- Nicknames: Khelang Nakhon (Thai: เขลางค์นคร); Kukuta Nakhon (white rooster city); Mueang Rot Ma (horse carriage city)
- Motto: ถ่านหินลือชา รถม้าลือลั่น เครื่องปั้นลือนาม งามพระธาตุลือไกล ฝึกช้างใช้ลือโลก ("Well-known coal. Renowned horse carriages. Celebrated pottery. The renowned beauty of Phra That (Lampang Luang). Internationally famed elephant training.")
- Map of Thailand highlighting Lampang province
- Country: Thailand
- Capital: Lampang

Government
  - Type: Province and Provincial Administrative Organization
  - Body: Lampang Province and Lampang Provincial Administrative Organization
  - Governor: Chutidej Meechan
  - PAO Chief Executive: Tuangrat Lohasunthon

Area
  - Total: 12,488 km^{2} (4,822 sq mi)
  - Rank: 9th

Population (2024)
  - Total: ▼704,126
  - Rank: 37th
  - Density: 56/km^{2} (150/sq mi)
  - Rank: 70th

Human Achievement Index
  - HAI (2022): 0.6390 "average" Ranked 42nd

GDP
  - Total: baht 68 billion (US$2.3 billion) (2019)
- Time zone: UTC+7 (ICT)
- Postal code: 52xxx
- Calling code: 054
- ISO 3166 code: TH-52
- Vehicle registration: ลำปาง
- Website: lampang.go.th

Lampang province
- "Lampang" in Thai language (top) and Northern Thai with Tai Tham script (bottom)

Thai name
- Thai: ลำปาง
- RTGS: Lampang

Northern Thai name
- Northern Thai: ᩃᩣᩴᨻᩣ᩠ᨦ (Lam phuang)

Lampang (Thai: ลำปาง, pronounced [lām.pāːŋ]; Northern Thai: ᩃᩣᩴᨻᩣ᩠ᨦ) is one of Thailand's seventy-six provinces (changwat), situated in upper northern Thailand. The old name of Lampang was Khelang Nakhon.

== Geography ==
Lampang is in the broad river valley of the Wang River, surrounded by mountains. In Mae Mo district lignite is found and mined in open pits. To the north of the province is the 1,697-metre (5,568 ft) high Doi Luang.

Within the province are Chae Son and Doi Khun Tan National Parks in the Khun Tan Range, as well as Tham Pha Thai, Doi Luang National Park, and the Huai Tak Teak Biosphere Reserve in the Phi Pan Nam Range. The total forest area is 8,747 km^{2} (3,377 sq mi) or 70 percent of provincial area.

=== National parks ===
There are nine national parks, of which six are in region 13 (Lampang branch), Doi Luang in region 15 (Chiang Rai), Wiang Kosai in region 13 (Phrae) and Si Satchanalai in region 14 (Tak), they are the protected areas in Lampang province. (Visitors in fiscal year 2024)

Tham Pha Thai National Park	1,200 km^{2} (460 sq mi)	(19,778)
Doi Luang National Park	1,169 km^{2} (451 sq mi)	(29,179)
Mae Wa National Park	582 km^{2} (225 sq mi)	(4,432)
Wiang Kosai National Park	410 km^{2} (160 sq mi)	(16,616)
Doi Chong National Park	336 km^{2} (130 sq mi)	(1.310)
Chae Son National Park	297 km^{2} (115 sq mi)	(171,423)
Doi Khun Tan National Park	255 km^{2} (98 sq mi)	(19,775)
Si Satchanalai National Park	213 km^{2} (82 sq mi)	(13,617)
Khelang Banphot National Park	80 km^{2} (31 sq mi)	(4,183)

=== Wildlife sanctuaries ===
There are two wildlife sanctuaries, Doi Pha Muang in region 13 (Lampang branch) and Tham Chao Ram in region 14 (Tak), they are the protected areas in Lampang province.

Doi Pha Muang Wildlife Sanctuary	687 km^{2} (265 sq mi)
Tham Chao Ram Wildlife Sanctuary	341 km^{2} (132 sq mi)

=== Location protected areas ===
Overview protected areas of Lampang

Lampang protected areas

	National park
1	Chae Song
2	Doi Chong
3	Doi Khun Tan
4	Doi Luang
5	Khelang Banphot
6	Mae Wa
7	Si Satchanalai
8	Tham Pha Thai
9	Wiang Kosai

	Wildlife sanctuary
10	Doi Pha Muang
11	Tham Chao Ram

== History ==
In Thoen district, at the southern edge of the province, archaeological survey has recorded the metal-working site of Den Pang Hang. The ranges there and along the boundary with Ban Dan Lan Hoi district in Sukhothai province hold tin, lead and iron, and are continuous with the mountains of Tak province to the west. Graves at Den Pang Hang and at other ridge sites nearby held iron machetes, chisels, axes and spears buried with the dead, of the same forms made at the smelting sites in the Mae Lamphan basin.

Starting in the 7th century Lampang was part of the Dvaravati period Hariphunchai Kingdom of the Mon. Mangrai of Lanna incorporated the whole of the Hariphunchai Kingdom into his own in 1292. Lampang or Nakhon Lampang or Lakhon, was under Burmese rule after the fall of Lanna Kingdom from the 16th century to 18th century. During the uprising against Burmese rule by Siam's new kings in the late-18th century, a local Lampang leader became Siam's ally. After the victory, the leader, Kawila, was named the ruler of Chiang Mai, the former center of Lanna, while his relative ruled Lampang. The city continues to be one of the important economic and political centers in the north. Lampang became a province of Thailand in 1892. Mon-speaking villages have also stood in the area of Lampang and Lamphun. McCormick and Jenny group them with the Thai Mon, communities thought to have originated in Burma in recent centuries.

== Transport ==
The city is an important highway hub, with a four lane highway link to Chiang Mai and Chiang Rai, as well as a major highway to Phrae and the eastern Lanna provinces. Lampang is roughly a 1.5 hour bus ride to Chiang Mai. Lampang is a stop for the Chiang Mai-bound train, approximately 10 hours from Bangkok.

Lampang Airport is served by Bangkok Airways (three flights daily to Suvarnabhumi Airport) and Nok air (four flights daily to Don Mueang) (Oct 2015).

== Health ==
The main hospital of Lampang is Lampang Hospital, operated by the Ministry of Public Health.

== Tourism ==
Lampang province is not visited by many tourists, only about 900,000 per year, most of them passing through. In early 2019, the provincial governor rolled out a program called "Lampang: Dream Destination" to raise the number of visitors to two million within two years.

== Economy ==
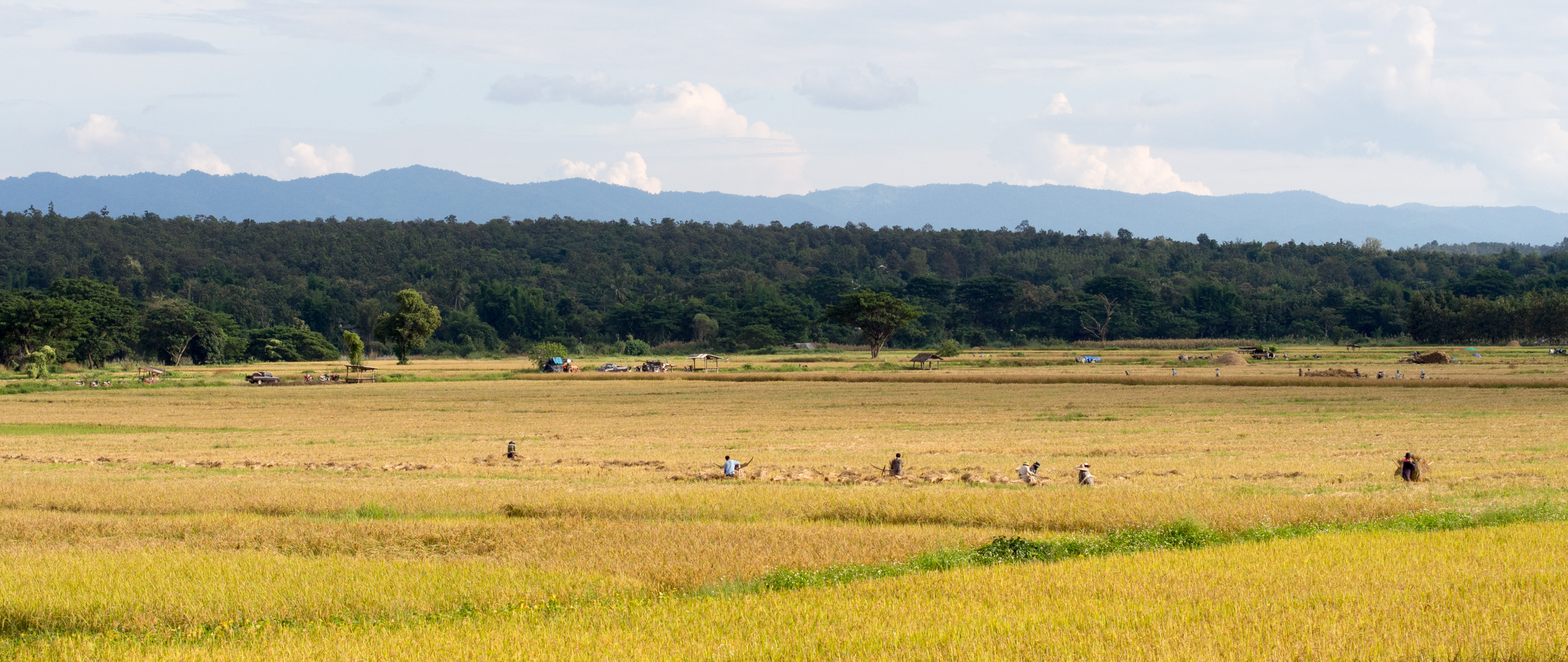
Rice harvest in Wang Nuea District with the mountains of the Phi Pan Nam Range in the distance

Lampang is known for the production of ceramic goods and its mining operations. A great deal of ball clay, china stone, and lignite are extracted from the surrounding mountains. There are more than 200 ceramic factories in and around Mueang Lampang District. Most are small- to medium-sized operations producing novelties (plant pots, dolls), tableware, and building materials (tiles, railings). The largest coal fired power plant in Southeast Asia is in Mae Mo District near the lignite mining area. The plant uses lignite as fuel. The largest concrete plant is also north of Mueang Lampang. This is also powered by lignite. Limestone is another abundant rock mined in Lampang. Agriculturally, the province produces rice and pineapples.

== Symbols ==
The provincial seal shows a white rooster inside the entrance to the Phra That Lampang Luang Temple. According to local legend, Buddha visited the province. The god Indra worried that the people would not wake up by themselves to show respect to Buddha, and therefore woke them by transforming himself into a white rooster.

The provincial flower is the Heliconia (Heliconia sp.), and the provincial tree is the Indian Elm (Holoptelea integrifolia). According to the legend, this tree was planted in the temple during Buddha's visit. The provincial aquatic life is the horseface locah (Acantopsis dialuzona).

== Administrative divisions ==
Map of 13 districts

=== Provincial government ===
The province is divided into 13 districts (amphoes). These are further divided into 100 subdistricts (tambons) and 855 villages (mubans).

1. Mueang Lampang
2. Mae Mo
3. Ko Kha
4. Soem Ngam
5. Ngao
6. Chae Hom
7. Wang Nuea
8. Thoen
9. Mae Phrik
10. Mae Tha
11. Sop Prap
12. Hang Chat
13. Mueang Pan

=== Local government ===
As of 26 November 2019 there are: one Lampang Provincial Administration Organisation (ongkan borihan suan changwat) and 42 municipal (thesaban) areas in the province. Lampang has city (thesaban nakhon) status. Khelang Nakhon, Lom Raet and Phichai have town (thesaban mueang) status. Further 38 subdistrict municipalities (thesaban tambon). The non-municipal areas are administered by 60 Subdistrict Administrative Organisations - SAO (ongkan borihan suan tambon).

== Human achievement index 2022 ==
Health	Education	Employment	Income
76	28	60	43
Housing	Family	Transport	Participation
22	58	54	3
Province Lampang, with an HAI 2022 value of 0.6390 is "average", occupies place 42 in the ranking.

Since 2003, United Nations Development Programme (UNDP) in Thailand has tracked progress on human development at sub-national level using the Human achievement index (HAI), a composite index covering all the eight key areas of human development. National Economic and Social Development Board (NESDB) has taken over this task since 2017.

Rank	Classification
1 - 13	"high"
14 - 29	"somewhat high"
30 - 45	"average"
46 - 61	"somewhat low"
62 - 77	"low"

Map with provinces and HAI 2022 rankings

== Gallery ==
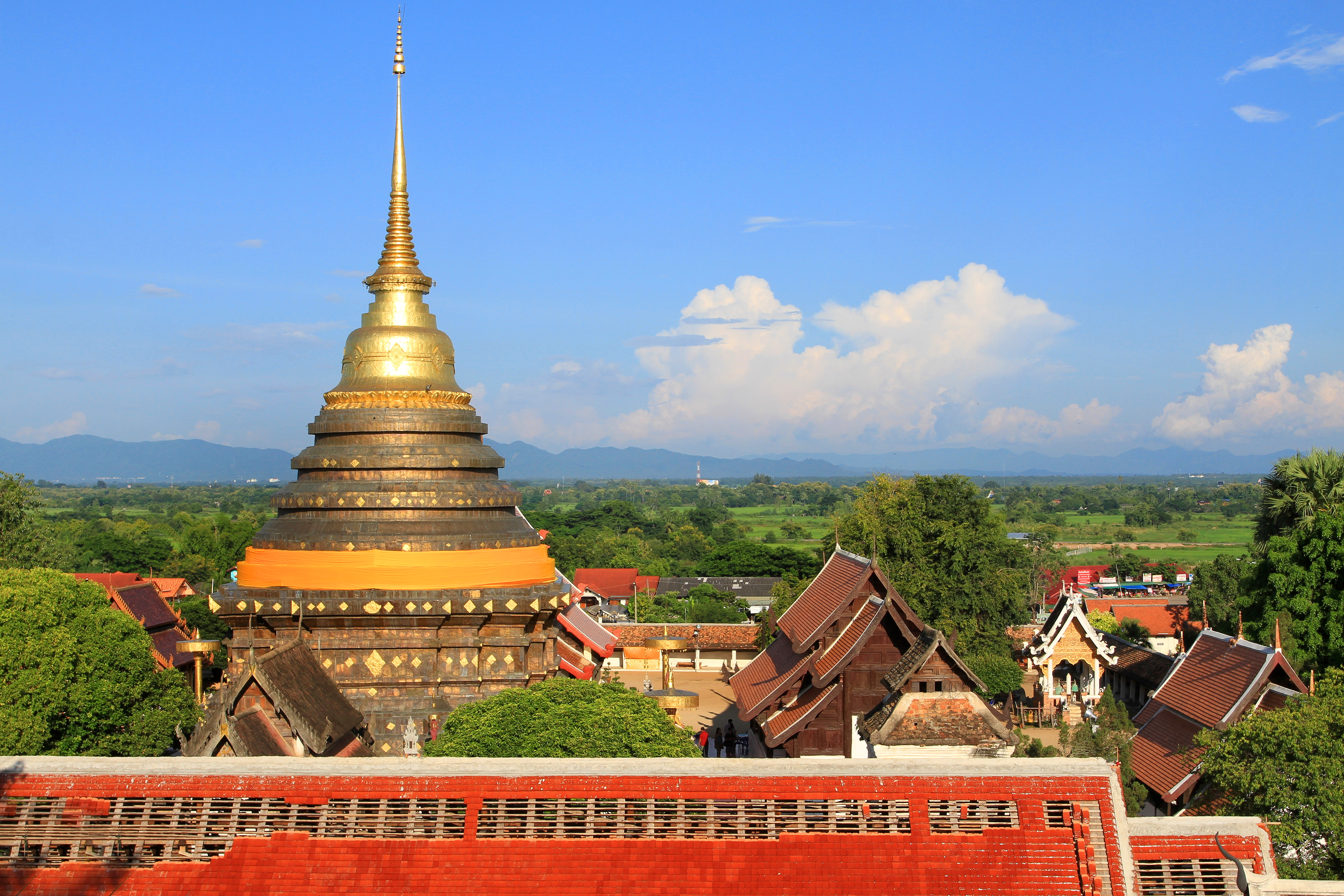
Wat Phra That Lampang Luang

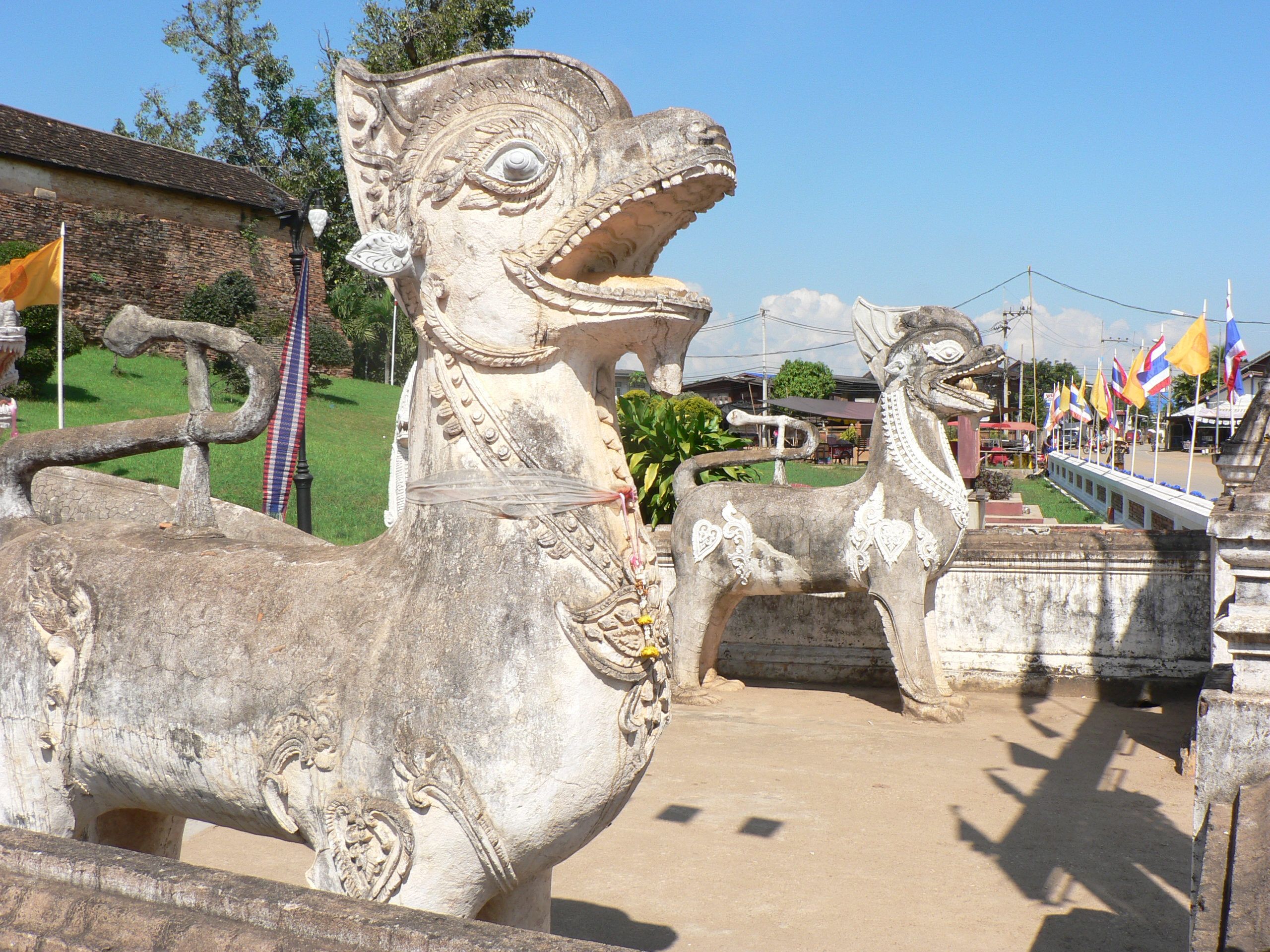
Singha Lanna

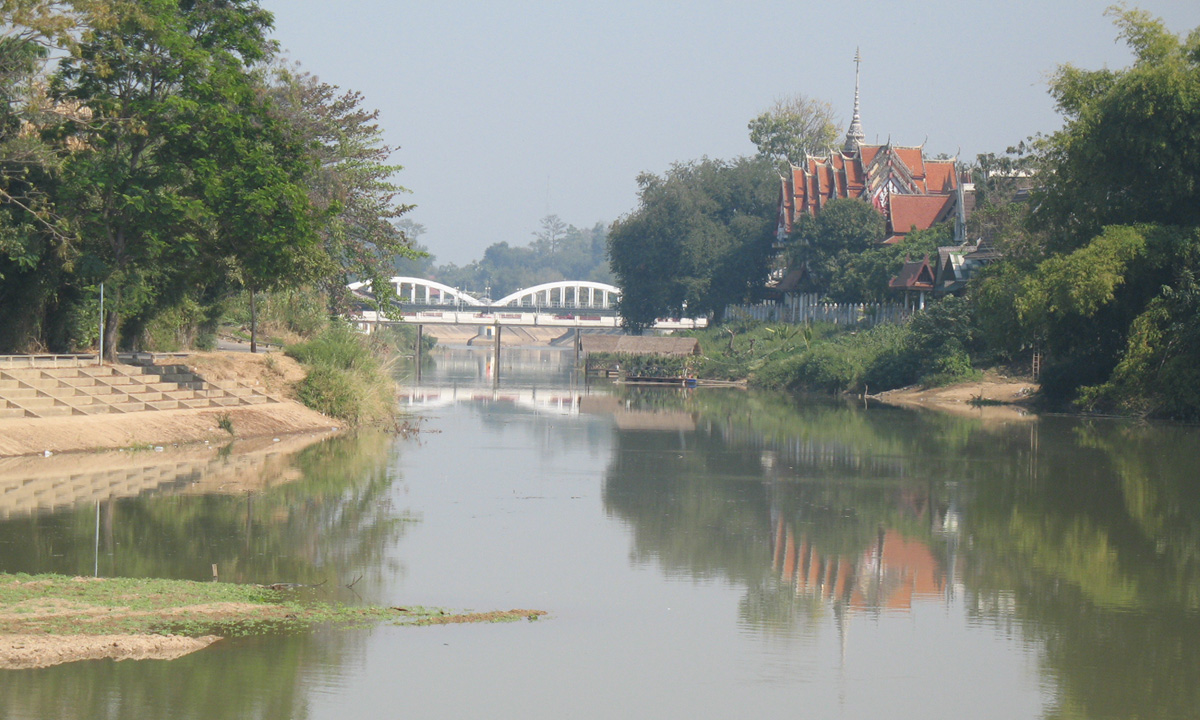
Wang River

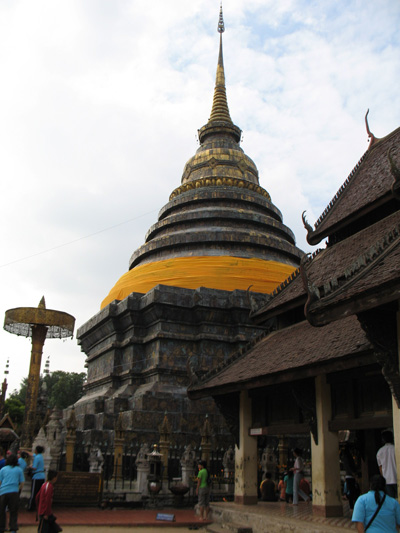
Phra That Lampang Luang

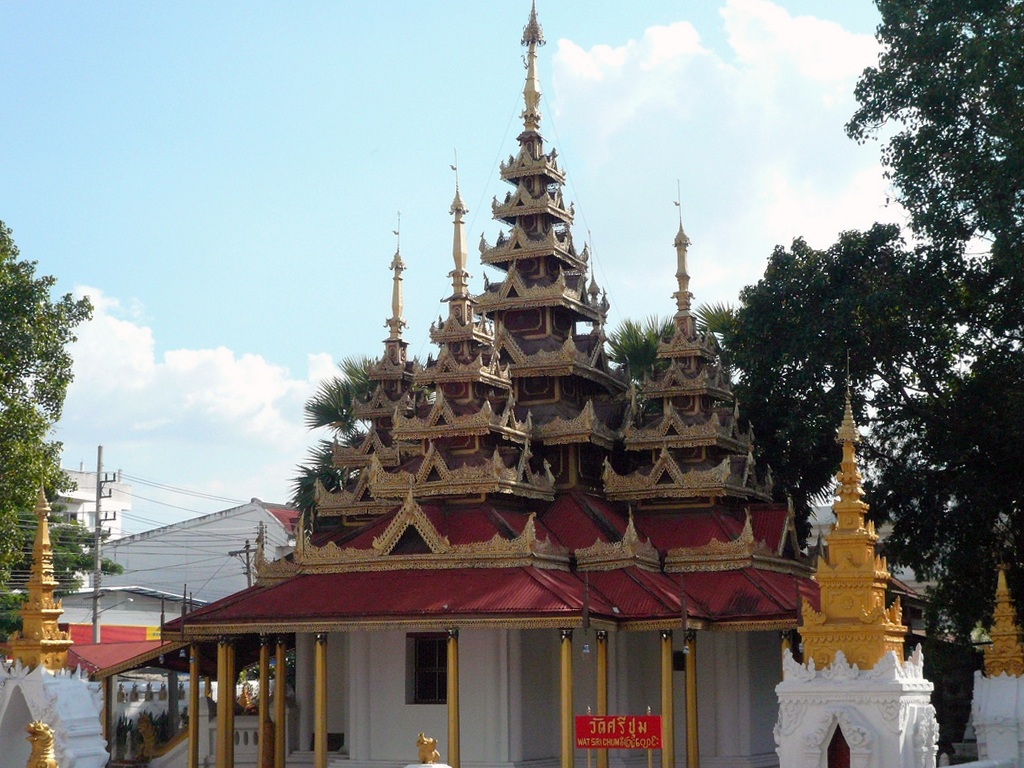
Burmese-style Wat Srichum

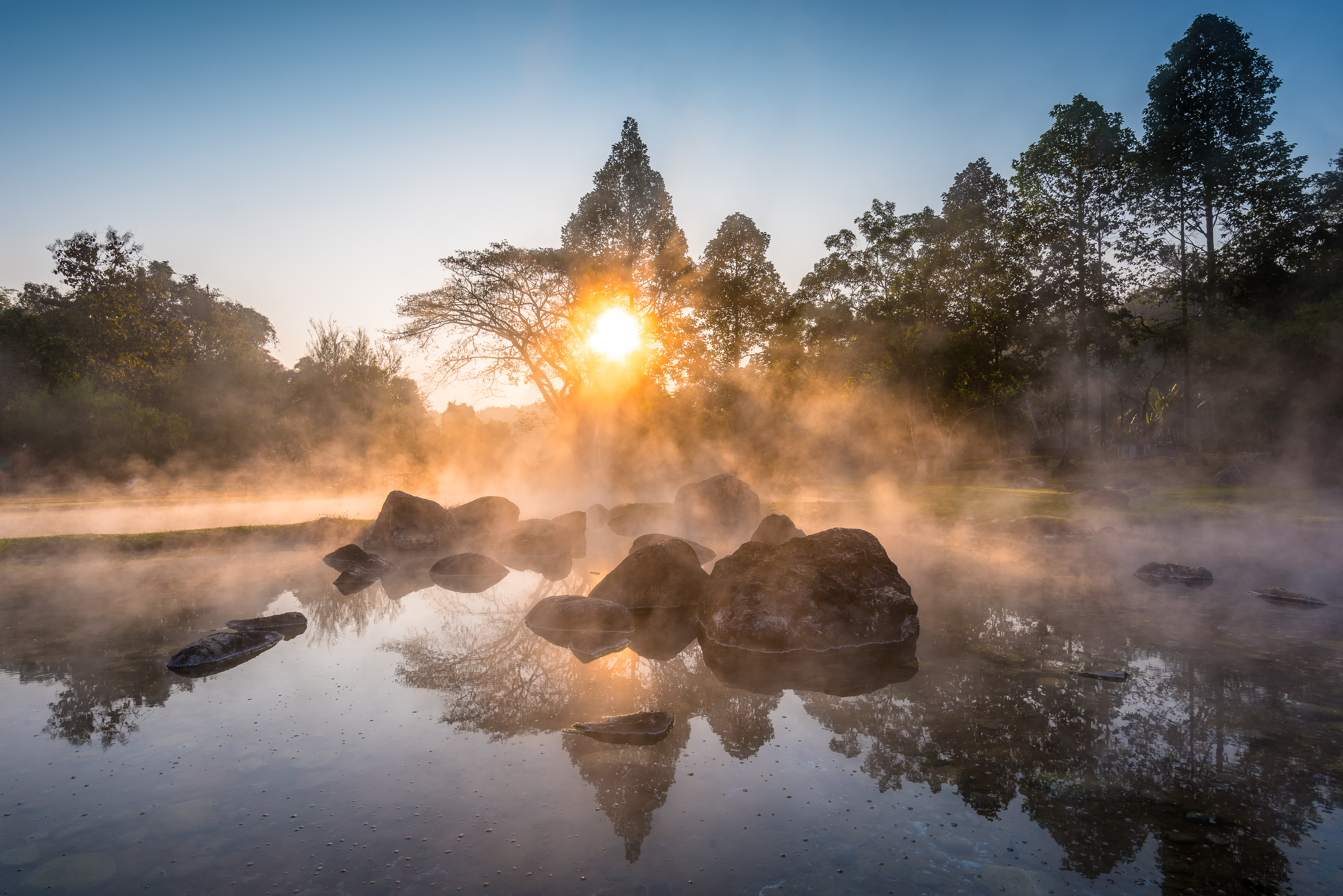
Chae Son National Park

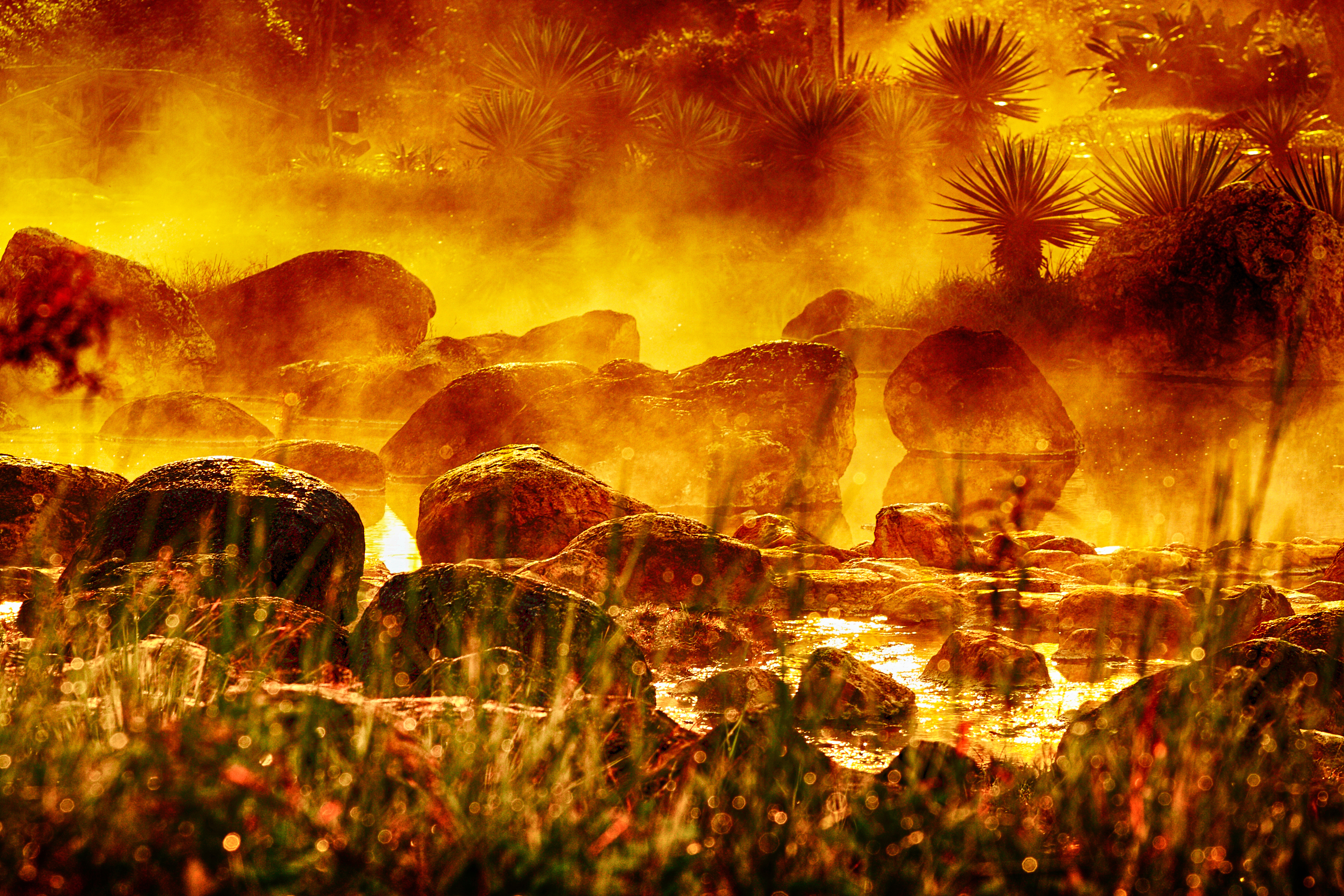
Hot springs at Chae Son National Park
