= Lạc Dương =

- Commune
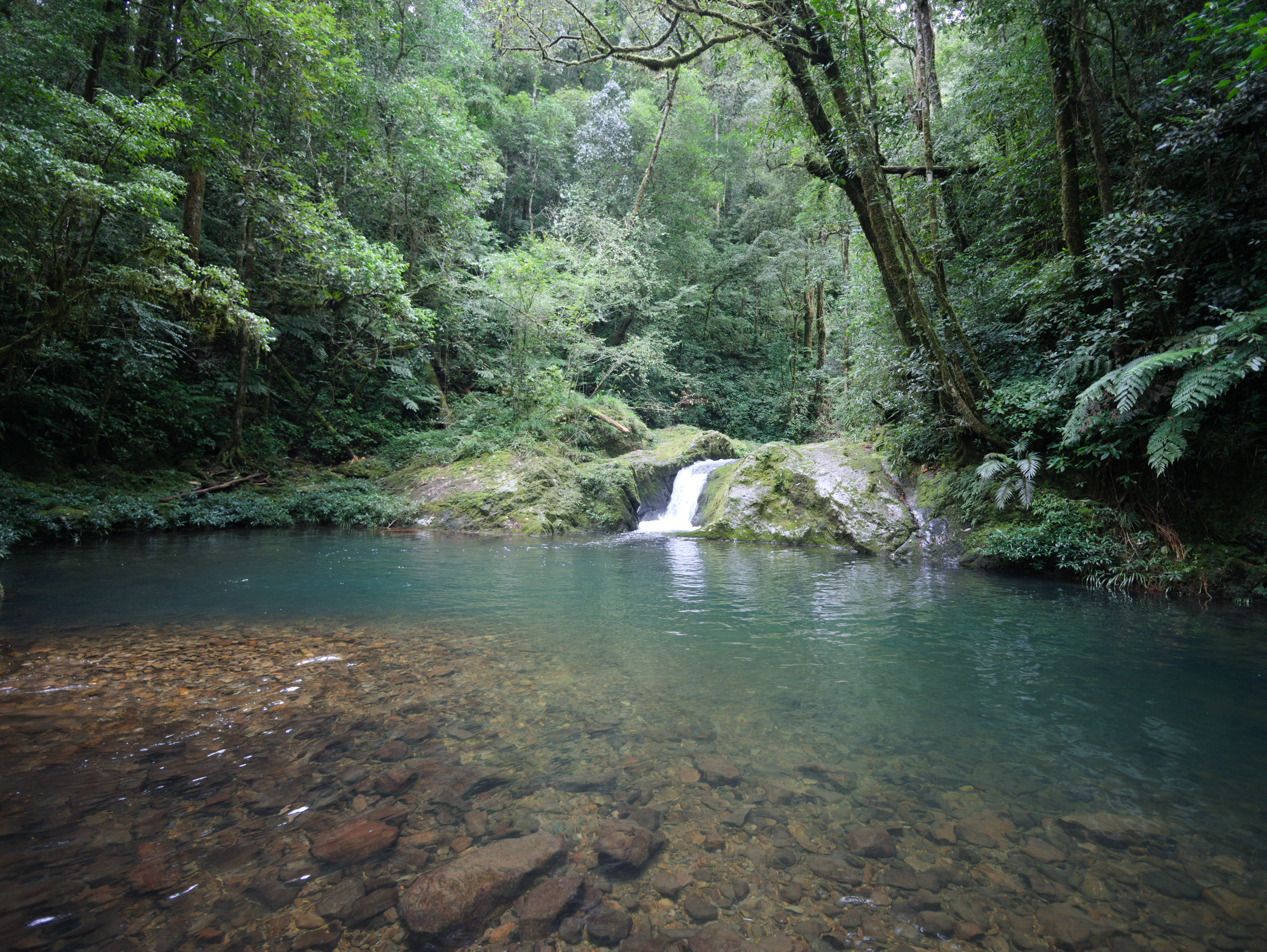
- Bidoup Nui Ba National Park
- Interactive map of Lạc Dương
- Coordinates: 12.104742539193076°N 108.55358054334414°E
- Country: Vietnam
- Region: South Central Coast and Central Highlands
- Province: Lâm Đồng
- Administrative headquarters: Liêng Bông Hamlet

Area
  - Total: 828.01 km^{2} (319.70 sq mi)

Population (31 December 2024)
  - Total: 14,912
  - Density: 18/km^{2} (47/sq mi)

Lạc Dương is a commune in Lâm Đồng province, Vietnam, and is the largest commune in the province by area.

On 16 June 2025, the Standing Committee of the National Assembly of Vietnam issued Resolution No. 1671/NQ-UBTVQH15 on the arrangement of commune-level administrative units in Lâm Đồng province in 2025. Under the resolution, the entire area and population of Đạ Nhim, Đạ Chais, and Đạ Sar communes, formerly part of Lạc Dương district, were merged to form a new commune named Lạc Dương.
