= Bidoup Núi Bà National Park =

National park in Vietnam

Bidoup Nui Ba National Park
- IUCN category II (national park)
- Location within Vietnam
- Location: Tây Nguyên, Việt Nam
- Nearest city: Đà Lạt
- Coordinates: 12°26′N 108°30′E
- Area: 64,800 km^{2} (25,000 sq mi)
- Governing body: UBND of Lâm Đồng Province

Bidoup Nui Ba National Park (Vietnamese language: Vườn quốc gia Bidoup Núi Bà) is a national park in areas of Đam Rông and Lạc Dương, in the province of Lâm Đồng, Vietnam.

The Bidoup Nui Ba national Park was established in 2004 and is named after the two highest peaks of the Langbiang plateau: Bidoup (2,287m) and Nui Ba (2,167m). With a total area of 70,038 ha, the park ranks as one of five largest national parks in Vietnam.

== Flora of Bidoup Nui Ba ==
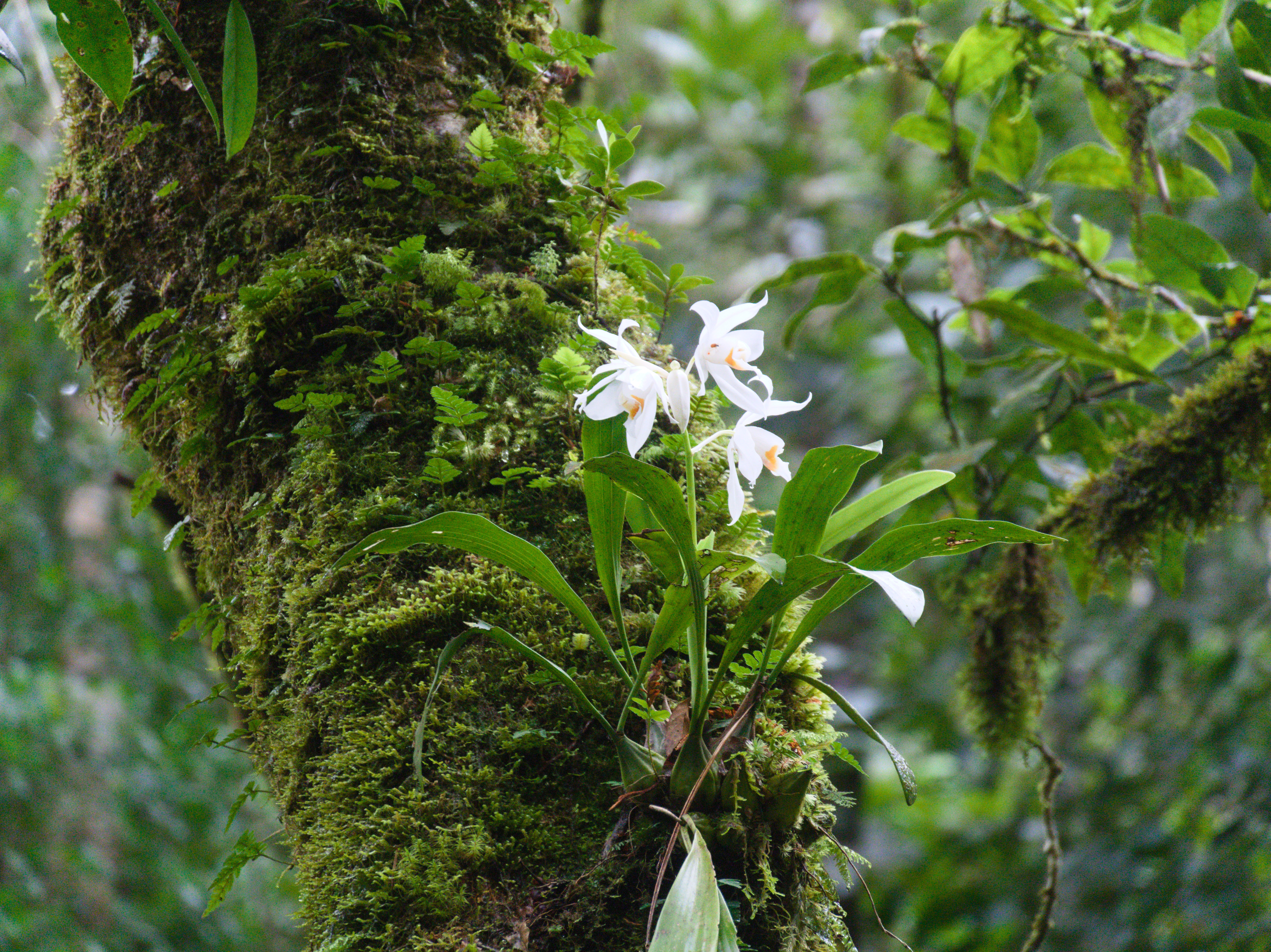
Coelogyne mooreana an orchid in Bidoup Nui Ba National Park

Over 1,933 recorded species of vascular plants including 96 endemic and 62 rare species which are listed in the IUCN Red list 2009. The park is home to over 14 out of 33 conifer species in Vietnam including many endemic and rare species, namely two-flat-needle leaf pine, five-needle leaf pine, Himalayan Yew (Taxus wallichiana), etc.

== Fauna of Bidoup Nui Ba ==
The park is home to over 441 species of vertebrate animals from 30 orders and 98 families. Thirty-two species are listed in the IUCN Red Book including many valuable, rare animals such as the pygmy slow loris, black-shanked douc, yellow-cheeked gibbon, Asiatic black bear, Dhole, Giant muntjac, Owston's civet, and more.

== Gallery ==
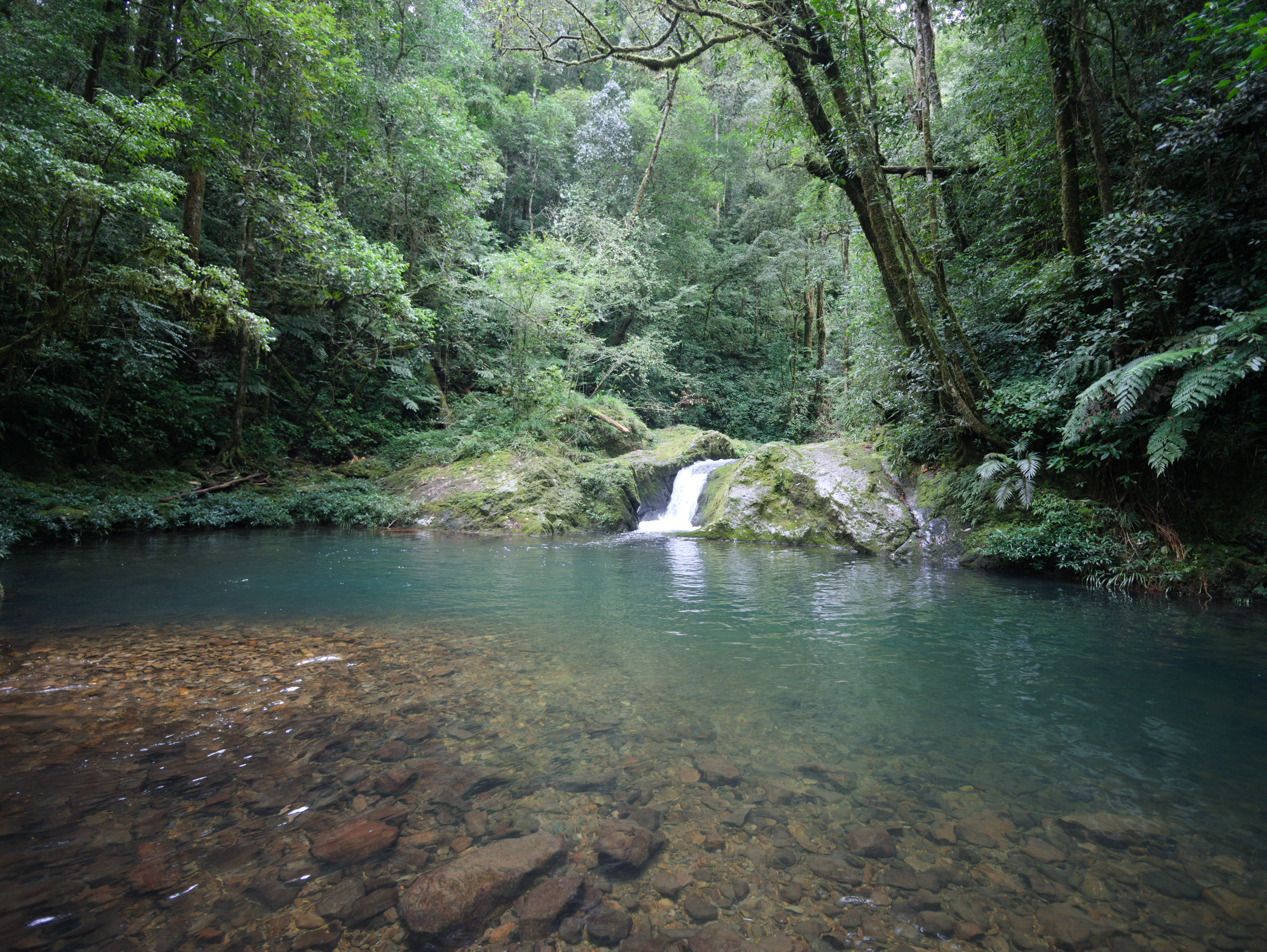
Hon Giao, Bidoup Nui Ba National Park

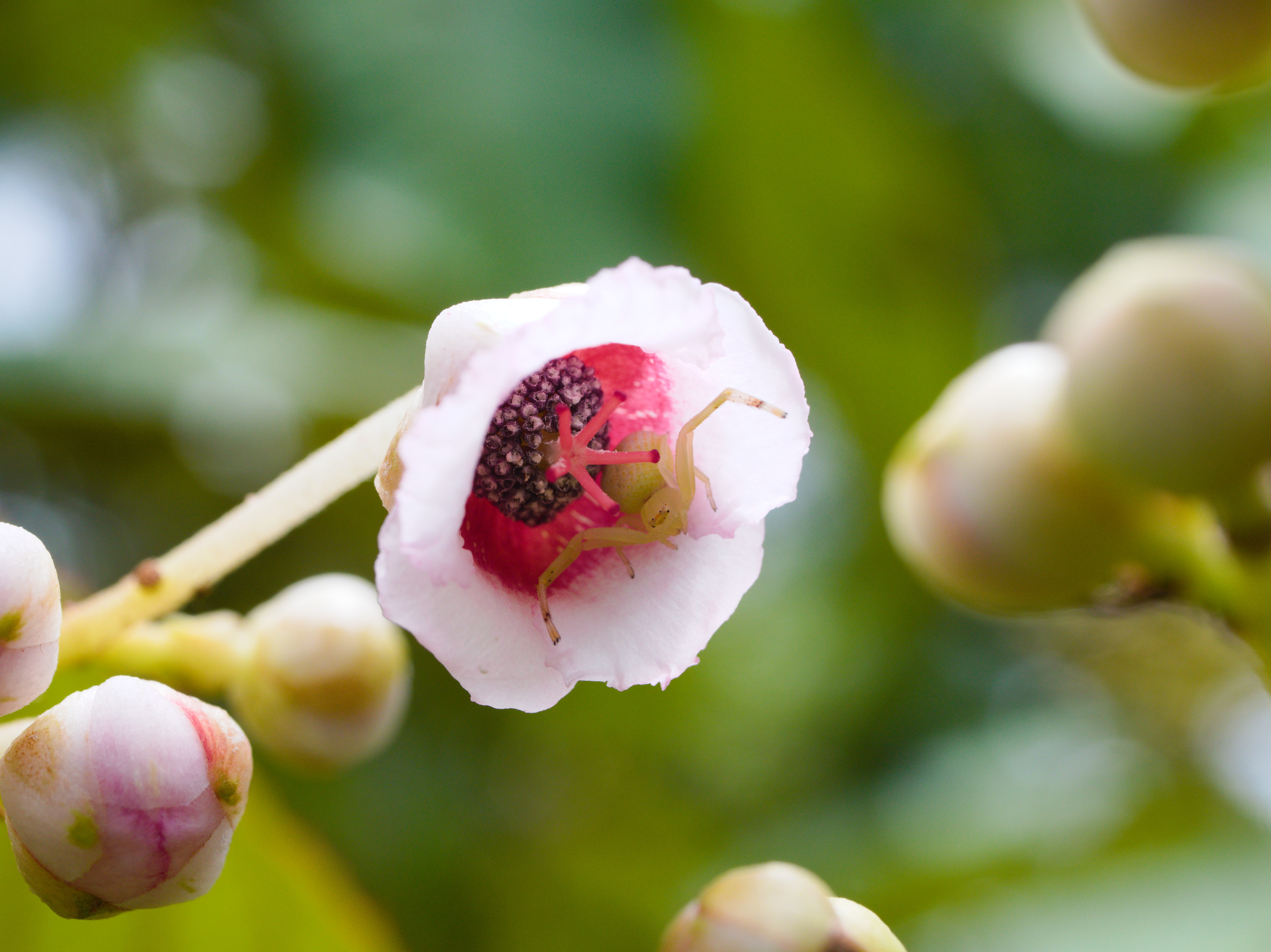
A spider hides inside a Saurauia napaulensis flower
