= Lạc Dương district =

Coordinates: 12.167°N 108.500°E

Lac Duong district Huyện Lạc Dương
- District
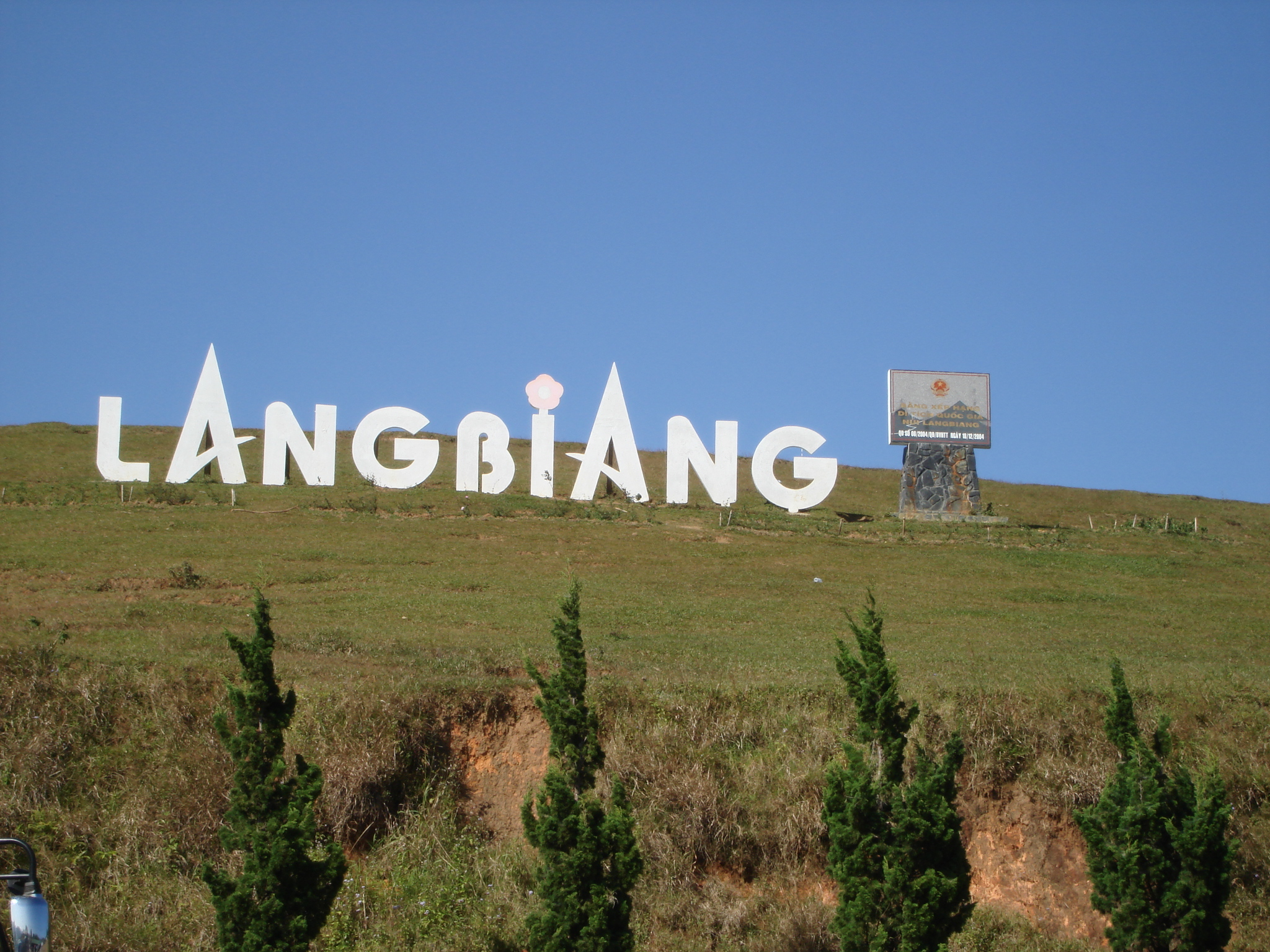
- Langbiang Peak in Luoyang, the roof of the Central Highlands

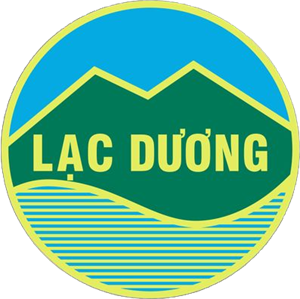
- Seal

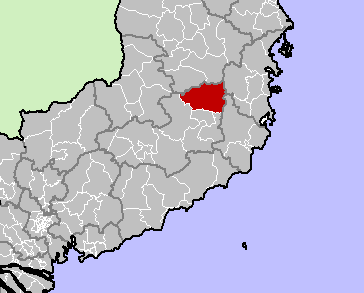
- Location in Lâm Đồng province
- Interactive map of Lac Duong district
- Country: Vietnam
- Region: Central Highlands
- Province: Lâm Đồng province
- Capital: Lạc Dương

Government
  - Chairman of the People's Committee: Sử Thanh Hoài
  - Chairman of the People's Council: Phạm Triều
  - Secretary: Phạm Triều

Area
  - Total: 507.32 sq mi (1,313.94 km^{2})

Population (2022)
  - Total: 35,635
  - Density: 41/sq mi (16/km^{2})
- Time zone: UTC+7 (Indochina Time)
- Website: lacduong.lamdong.gov.vn

Lạc Dương is a former district (huyện) of Lâm Đồng province in the Central Highlands region of Vietnam.

As of 2003 the district had a population of 16,081. The district covers an area of 1,231 km². The district capital lies at Lạc Dương.
