= Đam Rông district =

Coordinates: 12.0431°N 108.1739°E

Đam Rông district Huyện Đam Rông
- District
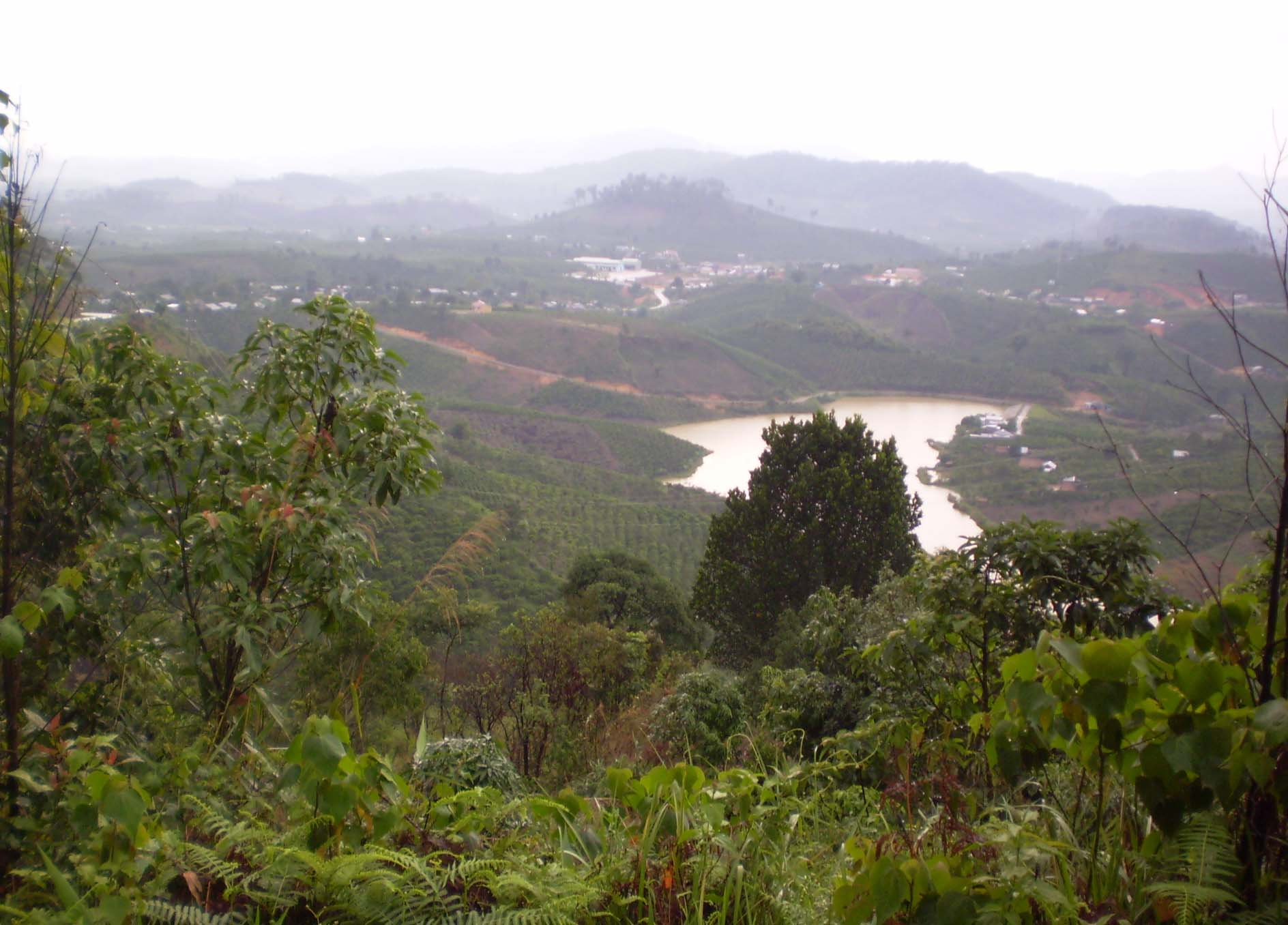
- Đạ K'Năng commune, Đam Rông District

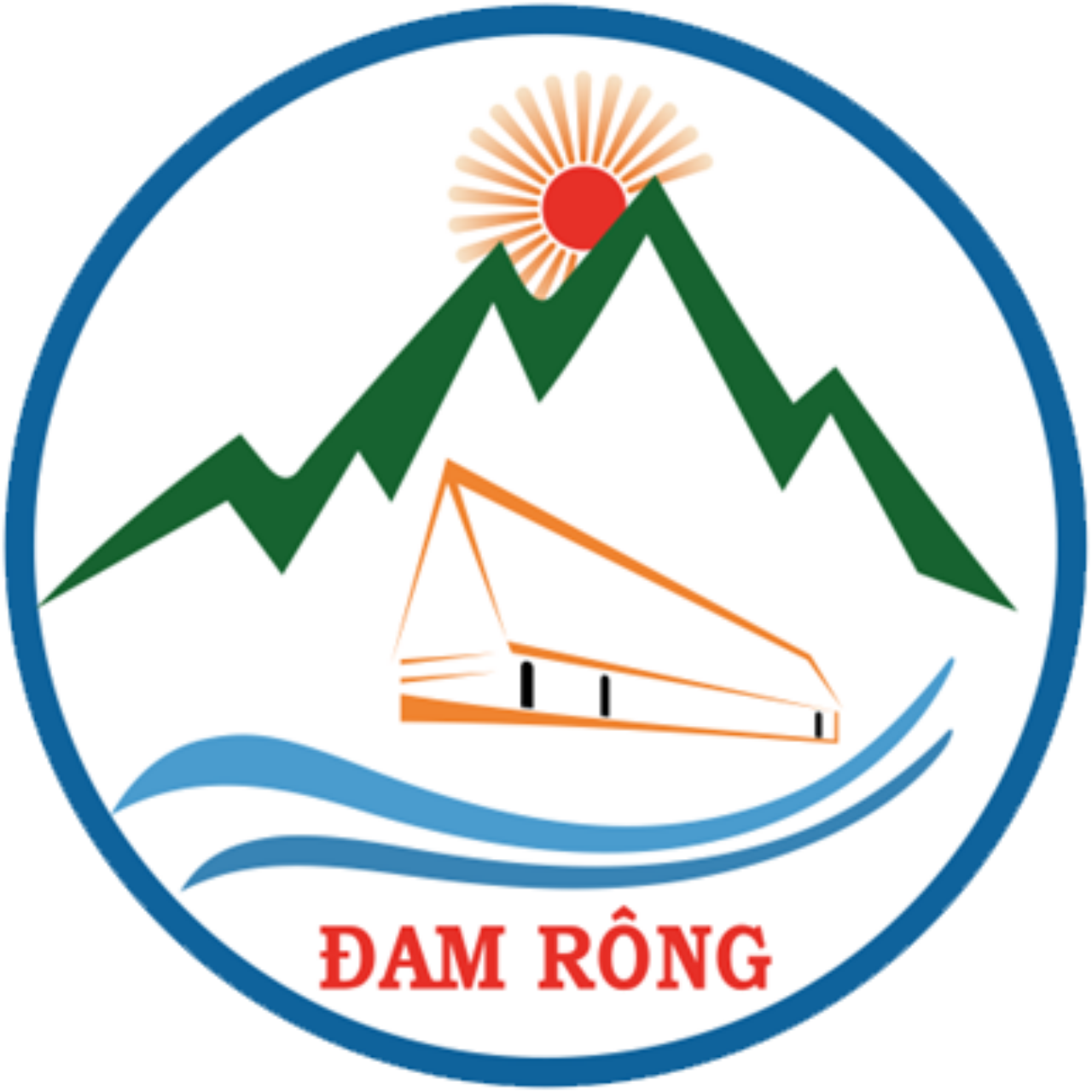
- Seal
- Interactive map of Đam Rông district
- Country: Vietnam
- Region: Central Highlands
- Province: Lâm Đồng
- Capital: Đam Rông

Area
  - Total: 344 sq mi (892 km^{2})

Population (2003)
  - Total: 30,734
- Time zone: UTC+7 (Indochina Time)

Đam Rông is a rural district of Lâm Đồng province in the Central Highlands region of Vietnam. As of 2009 the district had a population of 38,400. The district covers an area of 892.2 km^{2}. The district capital lies at Đam Rông.
