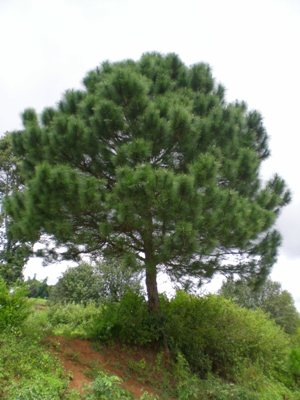
- Pinus latteri, Aungban, Shan State, eastern Burma, 20°39'40"N 96°35'16"E, 1400 m

Conservation status
- Near Threatened (IUCN 3.1)

Scientific classification
- Kingdom: Plantae
- Clade: Tracheophytes
- Clade: Gymnosperms
- Division: Pinophyta
- Class: Pinopsida
- Order: Pinales
- Family: Pinaceae
- Genus: Pinus
- Subgenus: P. subg. Pinus
- Section: P. sect. Pinus
- Subsection: P. subsect. Pinus
- Species: P. latteri

Binomial name
- Pinus latteri Mason

Synonyms
- Pinus ikedae Yamam. (1943); Pinus latteri subsp. tonkinensis (A.Chev.) Silba (2009); Pinus merkusiana Cooling & Gaussen (1970), no type indicated.; Pinus merkusii var. latteri (Mason) Silba (1990); Pinus merkusii subsp. latteri (Mason) D.Z.Li (1997); Pinus merkusii var. tonkinensis (A.Chev.) Gaussen ex Bui (1962); Pinus tonkinensis A.Chev. (1944)

= Pinus latteri =

Species of conifer

Pinus latteri, or Tenasserim pine, is a species of conifer in the family Pinaceae, a pine native to Mainland Southeast Asia.

== Description ==
Pinus latteri is a medium-sized to large tree, reaching 25–45 metres (82–148 feet) tall and with a trunk diameter of up to 1.5 m (5 ft). The bark is orange-red, thick and deeply fissured at the base of the trunk, and thin and flaky in the upper crown. The leaves ('needles') are in pairs, moderately slender, 15–20 centimetres (6–8 inches) long and just over 1 millimetre (1/32 in) thick, green to yellowish green. The cones are narrow conic, 6–14 cm (2 1/4–5 1/2 in) long and 4 cm broad at the base when closed, green at first, ripening glossy red-brown. They open to 6–8 cm broad, often some time after maturity or following heating by forest fires, to release the seeds. The seeds are 7–8 mm (9/32–5/16 in) long, with a 20–25 mm (25/32–31/32 in) wing, and are wind-dispersed.

=== Related species ===
Pinus latteri is closely related to Sumatran pine (Pinus merkusii), which occurs further south in Southeast Asia in Sumatra and the Philippines; some botanists treat the two as conspecific (under the name P. merkusii, which was described first), but the Sumatran pine differs in shorter (15–20 cm) and slenderer (under 1 mm thick) leaves, smaller cones with thinner scales, the cones opening at maturity, and seeds only half the weight. It is also related to the group of Mediterranean pines including Aleppo pine and Turkish pine, which share many features with it.

== Distribution and habitat ==
It grows in the mountains of southeastern Burma, northern Thailand, Laos, Cambodia, Vietnam, and Guangxi Province and Hainan island of China.

It generally occurs at moderate elevations, mostly from 400–1,000 m (1,300–3,300 ft), but occasionally as low as 100 m (330 ft) and up to 1,200 m (3,900 ft). The tree is named after the Tenasserim Hills between Myanmar and Thailand.
