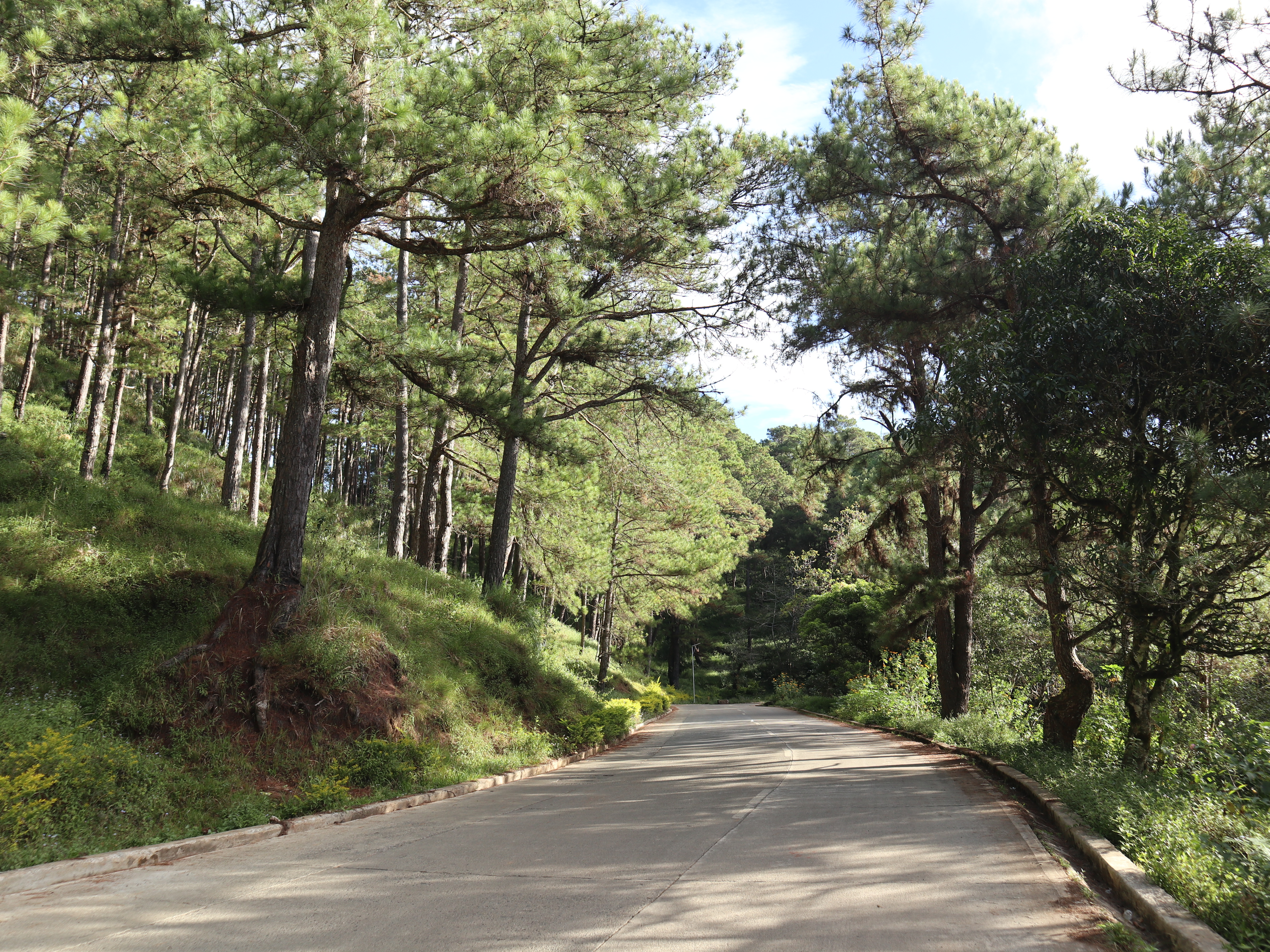
- Pinus kesiya forest in Sagada, Luzon, Philippines
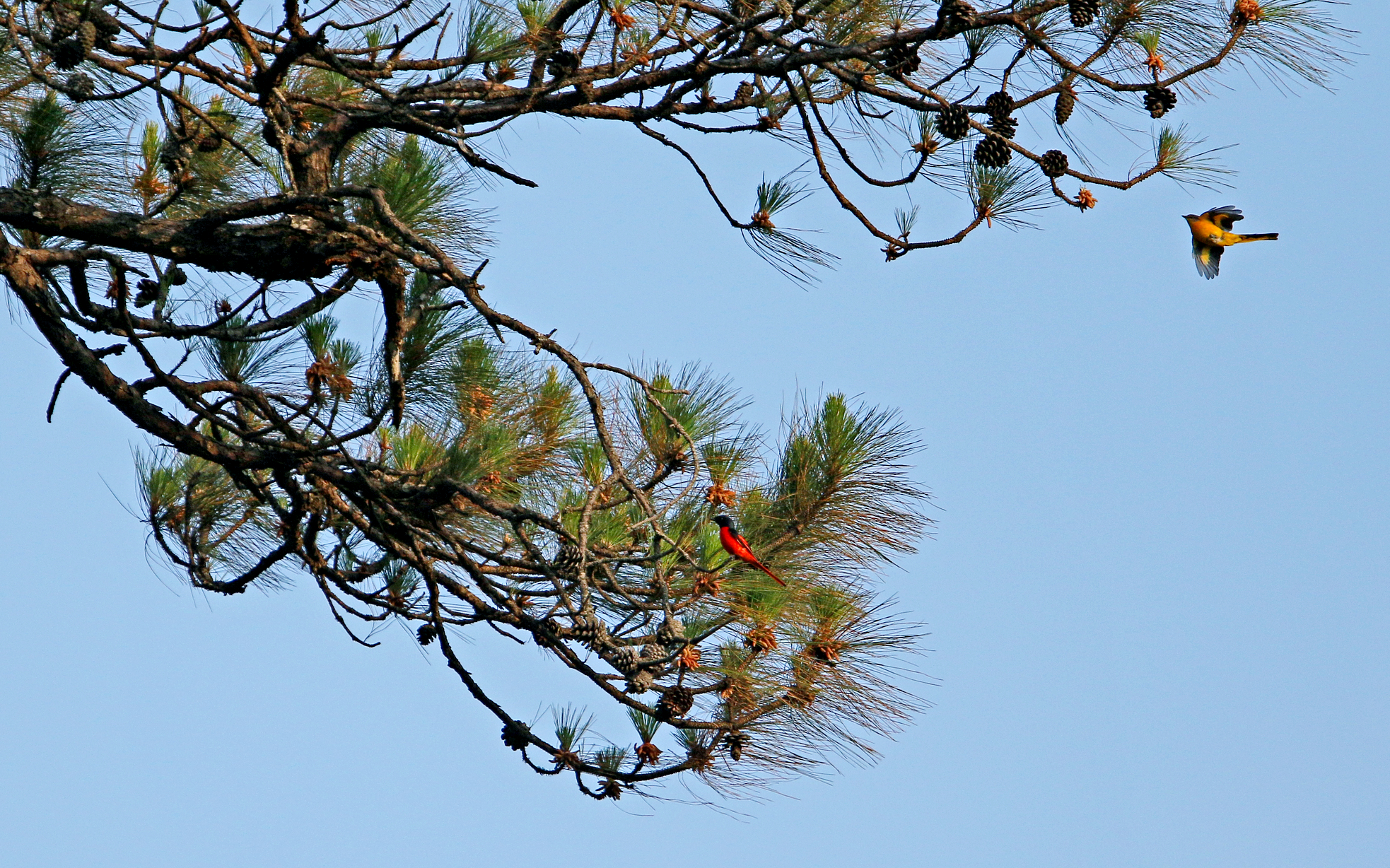
- Foliage and cones (with two long-tailed minivets), Doi Pha Hom Pok National Park, Thailand

Conservation status
- Least Concern (IUCN 3.1)

Scientific classification
- Kingdom: Plantae
- Clade: Tracheophytes
- Clade: Gymnosperms
- Division: Pinophyta
- Class: Pinopsida
- Order: Pinales
- Family: Pinaceae
- Genus: Pinus
- Subgenus: P. subg. Pinus
- Section: P. sect. Pinus
- Subsection: P. subsect. Pinus
- Species: P. kesiya

Binomial name
- Pinus kesiya Royle ex Gordon (1840)

Varieties
- See text

= Pinus kesiya =

Species of conifer

Pinus kesiya (Khasi pine or Benguet pine) is a species of conifer in the family Pinaceae, one of the most widely distributed pines in southeast Asia. Its range extends south and east from the Khasi Hills in the northeast Indian state of Meghalaya, to Burma, northern Thailand, Cambodia, Laos, southernmost China, Vietnam, and the Philippines. It is an important plantation species elsewhere in the world, including in southern Africa and South America.

The common name "Khasi pine" is from the Khasi hills in India, and "Benguet pine" is from the landlocked province of Benguet in Luzon, Philippines, where it is the dominant species of the Luzon tropical pine forests (known as saleng in Ilocano). The Benguet pine is sometimes treated as a separate species, Pinus insularis; however, the current opinion is to treat this as conspecific with P. kesiya var. langbianensis. The city of Baguio is nicknamed "The City of Pines", as it is noted for large stands of this tree.

== Description ==
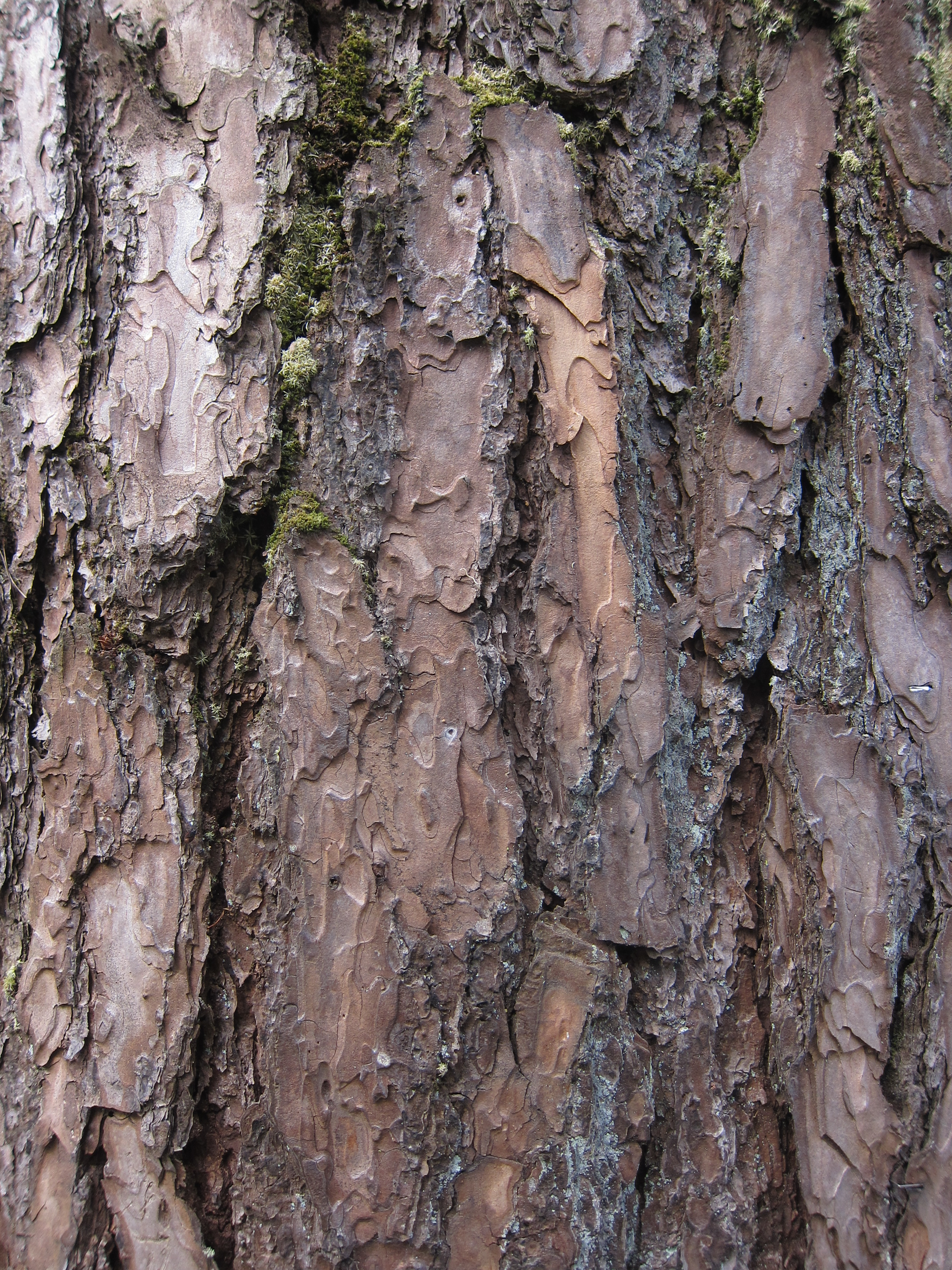
Pinus kesiya bark

Pinus kesiya is a tree reaching up to 30–35 metres (98–115 feet) tall with a straight, cylindrical trunk. The bark is thick, dark brown, and scaly with deep longitudinal fissures. The branches are robust, red brown from the second year, the branchlets horizontal to upcurved. The leaves are needle-like, dark green, usually three per fascicle, 12–20 centimetres (4 1/2–8 inches) long, the fascicle sheath 1–2 cm (1/2–3/4 in) long and persistent. The cones are ovoid, 5–9 cm (2–3 1/2 in) long, often curved downwards, sometimes slightly oblique; the scales of second-year cones are dense, the umbo a little convex, with a small prickle. The scales have transverse and longitudinal ridges across the middle of the scale surface. The seeds are winged, 6–7 mm (1/4–9/32 in) long with a 1.5–2.5 cm (5/8–1 in) wing. Pollination occurs in mid-spring, with the cones maturing 18–24 months after.

Khasi pine usually grows in pure stands or mixed with broad-leaved trees.

== Taxonomy ==
Pinus kesiya is a member of the largely Eurasian nominate group Pinus subgenus Pinus, section Pinus, distinguished by the cone umbo having an offset prickle on the umbo.

Two varieties are accepted by the Plants of the World Online database:

- Pinus kesiya var. kesiya
- Pinus kesiya var. langbianensis (A.Chev.) Gaussen ex Bui

They are only minimally distinct, with var. langbianensis cited as having on average shorter needles 12–16 cm (4 3/4–6 1/4 in) long as opposed to 12–20 cm (4 3/4–7 7/8 in) in var. kesiya; not all authors consider them distinct, treating the species as monotypic.

== Uses ==
The soft and light timber of Pinus kesiya can be used for a wide range of applications, including boxes, paper pulp, and temporary electric poles. It is intensely used for timber, both sourced in natural forests and plantations.

The good-quality resin is not abundant and has not been much used except during the Spanish colonial period in the Philippines for the production of turpentine.
