= List of protected areas of Thailand =

This is a list of protected areas in Thailand:

== National parks in the Thai highlands ==
- Chae Son National Park
- Doi Chong National Park
- Doi Inthanon National Park
- Doi Khun Tan National Park
- Doi Luang National Park
- Doi Pha Hom Pok National Park
- Doi Pha Klong National Park
- Doi Phu Kha National Park
- Doi Phu Nang National Park
- Doi Suthep-Pui National Park
- Doi Wiang Pha National Park
- Huai Nam Dang National Park
- Kaeng Chet Khwae National Park
- Khao Kho National Park
- Khlong Lan National Park
- Khlong Wang Chao National Park
- Khun Chae National Park
- Khun Khan National Park
- Khun Nan National Park
- Khun Phra Wo National Park
- Khun Sathan National Park
- Lam Nam Nan National Park
- Lam Nam Kok National Park
- Lan Sang National Park
- Mae Charim National Park
- Mae Moei National Park
- Mae Ngao National Park
- Mae Phang National Park
- Mae Puem National Park
- Mae Ping National Park
- Mae Ta Krai National Park
- Mae Tho National Park
- Mae Wa National Park
- Mae Wang National Park
- Mae Wong National Park
- Mae Yom National Park
- Na Haeo National Park
- Nam Nao National Park
- Namtok Chat Trakan National Park
- Namtok Mae Surin National Park
- Namtok Pha Charoen National Park
- Nanthaburi National Park
- Op Khan National Park
- Op Luang National Park
- Pha Daeng National Park
- Phu Hin Rong Kla National Park
- Phu Laen Kha National Park
- Phu Sang National Park
- Phu Soi Dao National Park
- Salawin National Park
- Si Lanna National Park
- Si Nan National Park
- Si Satchanalai National Park
- Taksin Maharat National Park
- Tham Pha Thai National Park
- Tham Pla–Namtok Pha Suea National Park
- Tham Sakoen National Park
- Thung Salaeng Luang National Park
- Ton Sak Yai National Park
- Wiang Kosai National Park

== National parks in Isan and adjacent areas ==
- Huai Huat National Park
- Kaeng Tana National Park
- Khao Phra Wihan National Park
- Khao Yai National Park
- Mukdahan National Park
- Na Haeo National Park
- Na Yung-Nam Som National Park
- Nam Phong National Park
- Pang Sida National Park
- Pa Hin Ngam National Park
- Pha Taem National Park
- Phu Chong–Na Yoi National Park
- Phu Kao–Phu Phan Kham National Park
- Phu Kradueng National Park
- Phu Langka National Park
- Phu Laen Kha National Park
- Phu Pha Lek National Park
- Phu Pha Man National Park
- Phu Pha Yon National Park
- Phu Phan National Park
- Phu Ruea National Park
- Phu Sa Dok Bua National Park
- Phu Suan Sai National Park
- Phu Wiang National Park
- Sai Thong National Park
- Ta Phraya National Park
- Tat Mok National Park
- Tat Ton National Park
- Thap Lan National Park

== National parks in western, central and eastern Thailand ==
- Chaloem Phrakiat Thai Prachan National Park
- Chaloem Rattanakosin National Park
- Erawan National Park
- Kaeng Krachan National Park
- Khao Chamao–Khao Wong National Park
- Khao Khitchakut National Park
- Khao Laem National Park
- Khao Sip Ha Chan National Park
- Khuean Srinagarindra National Park
- Khun Phra Wo National Park
- Kui Buri National Park
- Lam Khlong Ngu National Park
- Namtok Chet Sao Noi National Park
- Namtok Huai Yang National Park
- Namtok Khlong Kaeo National Park
- Namtok Pha Charoen National Park
- Namtok Phlio National Park
- Namtok Sam Lan National Park
- Pang Sida National Park
- Phra Phutthachai National Park
- Phu Toei National Park
- Ramkhamhaeng National Park
- Sai Yok National Park
- Thong Pha Phum National Park

== National parks in southern Thailand ==
- Bang Lang National Park
- Budo-Sungai Padi National Park
- Kaeng Krung National Park
- Khao Lak-Lam Ru National Park
- Khao Luang National Park
- Khao Nam Khang National Park
- Khao Nan National Park
- Khao Phanom Bencha National Park
- Khao Pu–Khao Ya National Park
- Khao Sok National Park
- Khlong Phanom National Park
- Namtok Ngao National Park
- Namtok Sai Khao National Park
- Namtok Si Khit National Park
- Namtok Yong National Park
- Si Phang-nga National Park
- Sirinat National Park
- Tai Rom Yen National Park
- Thale Ban National Park

== Marine national parks ==
- Ao Phang Nga
- Hat Wanakon
- Hat Chao Mai
- Hat Nai Yang
- Hat Nopharat Thara-Mu Ko Phi Phi
- Khao Laem Ya-Mu Ko Samet
- Khao Lampi–Hat Thai Mueang
- Khao Sam Roi Yot
- Laem Son
- Lam Nam Kra Buri
- Mu Ko Ang Thong
- Mu Ko Chang
- Mu Ko Chumphon
- Mu Ko Lanta
- Mu Ko Phetra
- Mu Ko Ranong
- Mu Ko Similan
- Mu Ko Surin
- Tarutao
- Than Bok Khorani

== Wildlife sanctuaries ==
- Buntharik - Khao Yot Mon Wildlife Sanctuary
- Chiang Dao Wildlife Sanctuary
- Doi Pha Chang Wildlife Sanctuary
- Doi Pha Muang Wildlife Sanctuary
- Dong Yai Wildlife Sanctuary
- Hala Bala Wildlife Sanctuary
- Hua Tabtan Hadsamran Wildlife Sanctuary
- Huai Kha Khaeng Wildlife Sanctuary
- Huai Sala Wildlife Sanctuary
- Khao Ang Rue Nai Wildlife Sanctuary
- Khao Khiao - Khao Chomphu Wildlife Sanctuary
- Khao Phra Thaeo Wildlife Sanctuary
- Khao Sanam Priang Wildlife Sanctuary
- Khao Soi Dao Wildlife Sanctuary
- Khlong Nakha Wildlife Sanctuary
- Khlong Phraya Wildlife Sanctuary
- Khlong Saeng Wildlife Sanctuary
- Khlong Yan Wildlife Sanctuary
- Lam Nam Nan Phang Kha Wildlife Sanctuary
- Lum Nam Pai Wildlife Sanctuary
- Mae Charim Wildlife Sanctuary
- Mae Lao-Mae Sae Wildlife Sanctuary
- Mae Nam Phachi Wildlife Sanctuary
- Mae Tuen Wildlife Sanctuary
- Mae Yom Phang Khwa Wildlife Sanctuary
- Nam Pat Wildlife Sanctuary
- Om Koi Wildlife Sanctuary
- Phanom Dong Rak Wildlife Sanctuary
- Phu Khat Wildlife Sanctuary
- Phu Khiao Wildlife Sanctuary
- Phu Luang Wildlife Sanctuary
- Phu Miang-Phu Thong Wildlife Sanctuary
- Phu Pha Daeng Wildlife Sanctuary
- Phu Wua Wildlife Sanctuary
- Salak Pra Wildlife Sanctuary
- Salawin Wildlife Sanctuary
- Sap Langka Wildlife Sanctuary
- Tabo-Huai Yai Wildlife Sanctuary
- Thungyai Naresuan Wildlife Sanctuary
- Ton Nga-Chang Wildlife Sanctuary
- Ton Pariwat Wildlife Sanctuary
- Umphang Wildlife Sanctuary
- Yot Dom Wildlife Sanctuary

== Forest parks ==
- Bantak Petrified Forest Park
- Khao Kradong Forest Park
- Khao Laem Sing Forest Park
- Khao Phang Forest Park
- Kosamphi Forest Park
- Namron Huai Mak Liam Forest Park
- Namtok Huai Lao Forest Park
- Namtok Hua Mae Kham Forest Park
- Namtok Huai Mae Sak Forest Park
- Namtok Khun Kon Forest Park
- Namtok Mae Tho Forest Park
- Namtok Pong Phra Bat Forest Park
- Namtok Raman Forest Park
- Namtok Sai Khao Forest Park
- Namtok Si Chomphu Forest Park
- Namtok Than Ngam Forest Park
- Namtok Than Thip Forest Park
- Namtok Thara Sawan Forest Park
- Namtok Tat Khwan Forest Park
- Phae Mueang Phi Forest Park
- Phaya Pipak Forest Park
- Phnom Sawai Forest Park
- Phu Chi Fa Forest Park
- Phu Faek Forest Park
- Phu Langka Forest Park
- Phu Mu Forest Park
- Phu Muang Forest Park
- Phu Pha Lom Forest Park
- Phu Phra Bat Buabok Forest Park
- Pran Buri Forest Park
- Pratan Dongrung Forest Park
- Sa Nang Manora Forest Park
- San Pha Phaya Phrai Forest Park
- Tham Luang - Khun Nam Nang Non Forest Park
- Tung Bua Tong Forest Park

== Other protected areas ==
- Ao Khung Kraben Non-hunting Area
- Ban Chiang archaeological site
- Ban Yang Non-hunting Area
- Bo Pho Thi–Pak Thong Chai Non-hunting Area
- Bueng Boraphet Non-hunting Area
- Bueng Khong Long Non-hunting Area
- Don Hoi Lot
- Dong Khlo–Huai Kapo Non-hunting Area
- Huai Phueng–Wang Yao Non-hunting Area
- Khao Kho Non-hunting Area
- Khao Noi–Khao Pradu Non-hunting Area
- Khao Phanom Thong Non-hunting Area
- Khao Somphot Non-hunting Area
- Khao Tha Phet Non-hunting Area
- Khao Yai–Khao Na Pha Tang and Khao Ta Phrom Non-hunting Area
- Khu Khut Water Fowl Park
- Krabi River Estuary
- Kraburi River Estuary
- Mae Salit - Pong Daeng Forestry Reserve
- Nong Han Kumphawapi Lake
- Nong Thung Thong Non-hunting Area
- Pha Nam Thip Non-hunting Area
- Phanom Rung historical park
- Phu San Khiao Non-hunting Area
- Phutthabat Chon Daen Non-hunting Area
- Song Khwae Non-hunting Area
- Tha Daeng Non-hunting Area
- Thale Noi Non-hunting Area
- Tham Pha Tha Phon Non-hunting Area
- Wang Pong–Chon Daen Non-hunting Area

== See also ==
- List of Ramsar wetlands of Thailand
- Environmental issues in Thailand
- List of caves in Thailand
- Mekong River Protected areas
- IUCN Protected Area Management Categories
- Historical parks of Thailand
- List of Protected Areas Regional Offices of Thailand
