= Phu Kao–Phu Phan Kham National Park =

National park of Thailand

- อุทยานแห่งชาติภูเก้า-ภูพานคำ
- IUCN category II (national park)
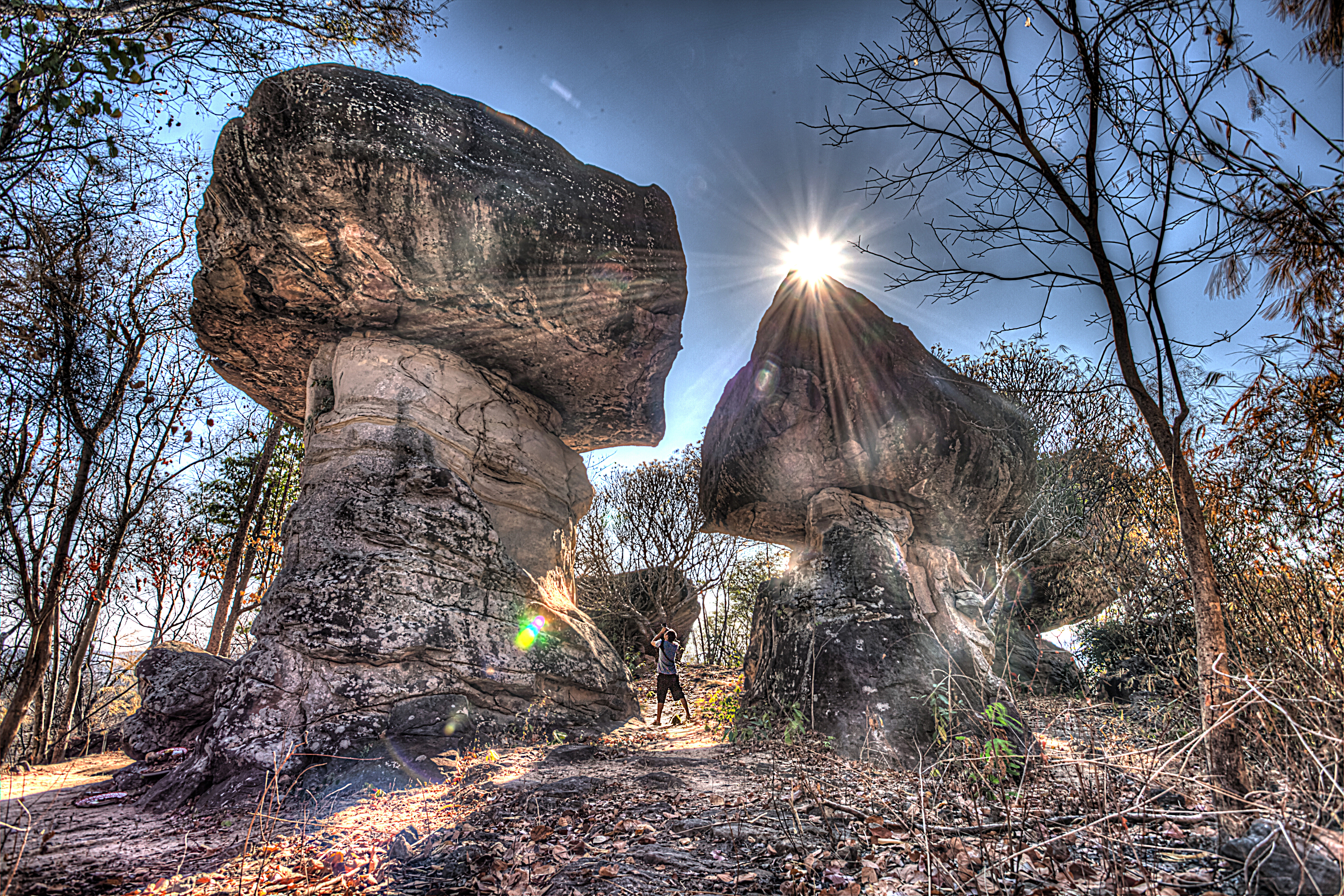

- Location within Thailand
- Location: Thailand
- Nearest city: Khon Kaen
- Coordinates: 16°48′38″N 102°36′40″E
- Area: 318 km^{2} (123 sq mi)
- Established: 1985
- Visitors: 4,337 (in 2019)
- Governing body: Department of National Parks, Wildlife and Plant Conservation

Phu Kao–Phu Phan Kham National Park (Thai: อุทยานแห่งชาติภูเก้า-ภูพานคำ) is a national park in Thailand's Khon Kaen and Nong Bua Lamphu provinces. This mountainous park, in two separate sections, encompasses part of the Ubol Ratana Dam reservoir and also features rock formations and waterfalls. The park is named for the Phu Kao and Phu Phan Kham mountain ranges of the Khorat Plateau.

== Geography ==
Phu Kao–Phu Phan Kham National Park is located about 60 kilometres (40 mi) northwest of the city of Khon Kaen in the Ubolratana and Phu Wiang districts of Khon Kaen Province and the Non Sang district of Nong Bua Lamphu Province. The park's area is 198,973 rai ~ 318 square kilometres (123 sq mi). The park's western section is located in the Phu Kao mountain range and the eastern section in the Phu Phan Kham mountain range of the Phu Phan Mountains.

== History ==
The park's western section is home to numerous caves hosting prehistoric rock paintings such as Tham Palan Hai, Tham Muem and Tham Rakha Khanit. Ancient artifacts of the Ban Chiang era have also been discovered in the area. The rock paintings and artifacts are estimated at more than 3,500 years old.

In 1985 the park was established as Thailand's 50th national park.

== Attractions ==
Part of the Ubol Ratana Dam reservoir is in the park's eastern section and is located by the park headquarters. The rock formations at Ham Tang have been eroded by wind and water into unusual shapes such as a mushroom-like pillar.

The park's western section hosts the Tat Fa and Tat Hin Taek waterfalls. Tat Fa cascades through forest before falling 7 metres (23 ft) into a large pool. The western section is also home to the Wat Phra Phutthabat Phu Kao temple which hosts rock footprints of a human and a dog.

== Flora and fauna ==
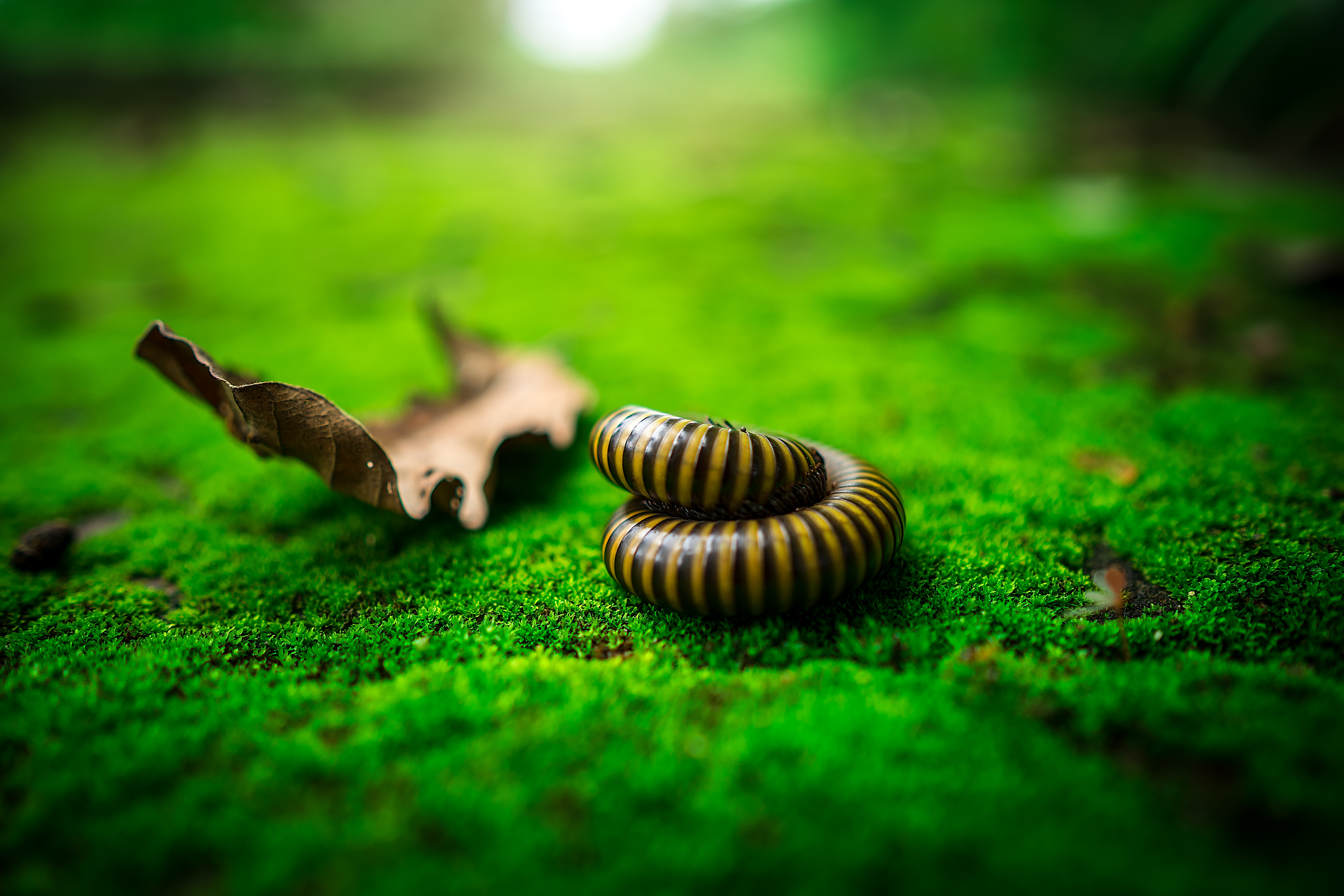
Millipede in the park

The park's main forest type is deciduous dipterocarp, especially in higher areas. Tree species here include Shorea roxburghii, Dipterocarpus obtusifolius, Olea brachiata and Cycas species.

Mixed deciduous forest occupies some lower elevations including along river banks. Tree species here include Burma padauk, wild almond and Ceylon oak.

Dry evergreen forest is found only along creeks and hosts such trees as tabaek, Dipterocarpus alatus and makha.

Bird life includes white wagtail, Richard's pipit, sooty-headed bulbul, streak-eared bulbul, oriental magpie-robin, greater coucal and common tailorbird.

== Location ==
Phu Kao-Phu Phan Kham National Park in overview PARO 10 (Udon Thani)

3) Phu Kao-Phu Phan Kham National Park in overview PARO 10 (Udon Thani)

	National park
1	Na Yung–Nam Som
2	Phu Hin Chom That–Phu Phra Bat
3	Phu Kao–Phu Phan Kham
4	Phu Langka
5	Phu Pha Lek
6	Phu Phan
7	Phu Pha Yon

	Wildlife sanctuary
8	Phu Wua
	Non-hunting area
9	Bueng Khong Long
10	Kutting
11	Nong Han Kumphawapi
12	Nong Hua Khu

	Forest park
13	Bua Ban
14	Namtok Khoi Nang
15	Namtok Than Thip
16	Phu Khao Suan Kwang
17	Phu Pha Daen
18	Wang Sam Mo

== See also ==
- List of national parks of Thailand
- List of Protected Areas Regional Offices of Thailand
