= Phu Phan National Park =

National park in Thailand

- ภูพานอุทยานแห่งชาติ
- IUCN category II (national park)
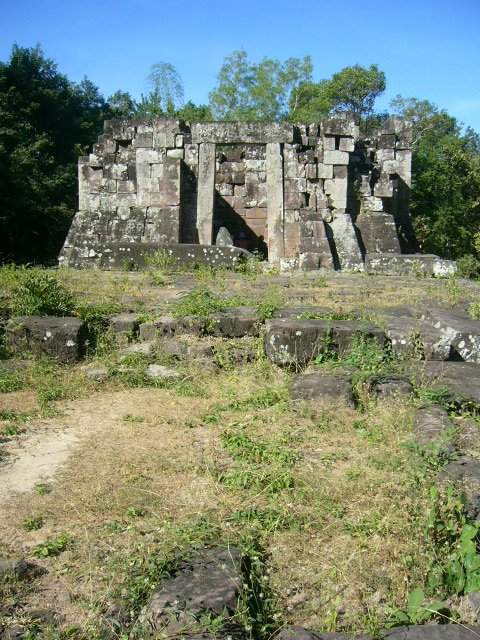
- Phra That Phu Pek

- Location within Thailand
- Location: Sakon Nakhon and Kalasin provinces, Thailand
- Nearest city: Sakon Nakhon
- Coordinates: 17°3′45″N 103°58′22″E
- Area: 665 km^{2} (257 sq mi)
- Established: 13 November 1972
- Visitors: 4,895 (in 2019)
- Governing body: Department of National Parks, Wildlife and Plant Conservation

Phu Phan National Park (Thai: ภูพานอุทยานแห่งชาติ) is a national park in Sakon Nakhon and Kalasin provinces, Thailand. This isolated park covers a wide jungle area in the Phu Phan Mountains of Isan.

== Geography ==
Phu Phan National Park is located 25 kilometres (16 mi) south west of Sakon Nakhon town and about 25 kilometres (16 mi) north of Kalasin. The park's area is 415,439 rai ~ 665 square kilometres (257 sq mi).

== History ==
In the past, the isolation of the park's location led to its use for cover by some military groups. During World War II, the Seri Thai resistance fighters used the Tham Seri Thai cave for weapons storage. And in the 1970s the People's Liberation Army of Thailand (PLAT) used the area as a hideout.

== Attractions ==
Viewpoints in the park include the west-facing Nang Mern Cliff and the Lan Sao Aee plateau.

The park has numerous waterfalls, including the multi-stage Kam Hom Waterfall, also Kreng Ka-arm and Pree-cha Suk-san waterfalls.

Some of the park's unusual rock formations include the grilled-snake-shaped Khong Ping Ngu and the 8 metres (26 ft) long Tang Pee Parn natural stone bridge.

The park also contains the ruins of a Khmer temple, Phra That Phu Pek, accessed by ascending around 500 steps.

== Flora and fauna ==
The park consists of seasonal tropical forest, with a large dry dipterocarp forest component. Other forest tree types here are dry evergreen and mixed deciduous. Tree species include Dalbergia cochinchinensis, Pterocarpus macrocarpus, Shorea roxburghii, Afzelia xylocarpa, Hopea odorata, Dipterocarpus alatus, Dipterocarpus obtusifolius, Dipterocarpus tuberculatus, Shorea obtusa, Terminalia alata, Irvingia malayana, Shorea siamensis, Lagerstroemia calyculata, Tetrameles nudiflora, Xylia xylocarpa Peltophorum dasyrhachis and Dillenia obovata.

Animal species include tiger, Phayre's leaf monkey, sambar deer, fishing cat, Sunda flying lemur, Malayan porcupine, common palm civet, northern red muntjac and wild boar. Bird species include black drongo, hill myna, Richard's pipit and white-rumped shama.

== Location ==
Phu Phan National Park in overview PARO 10 (Udon Thani)

6) Phu Phan National Park in overview PARO 10 (Udon Thani)

	National park
1	Na Yung–Nam Som
2	Phu Hin Chom That–Phu Phra Bat
3	Phu Kao-Phu Phan Kham
4	Phu Langka
5	Phu Pha Lek
6	Phu Phan
7	Phu Pha Yon

	Wildlife sanctuary
8	Phu Wua
	Non-hunting area
9	Bueng Khong Long
10	Kutting
11	Nong Han Kumphawapi
12	Nong Hua Khu

	Forest park
13	Bua Ban
14	Namtok Khoi Nang
15	Namtok Than Thip
16	Phu Khao Suan Kwang
17	Phu Pha Daen
18	Wang Sam Mo

== See also ==
- List of national parks of Thailand
- List of Protected Areas Regional Offices of Thailand
