= List of forest parks of Thailand =

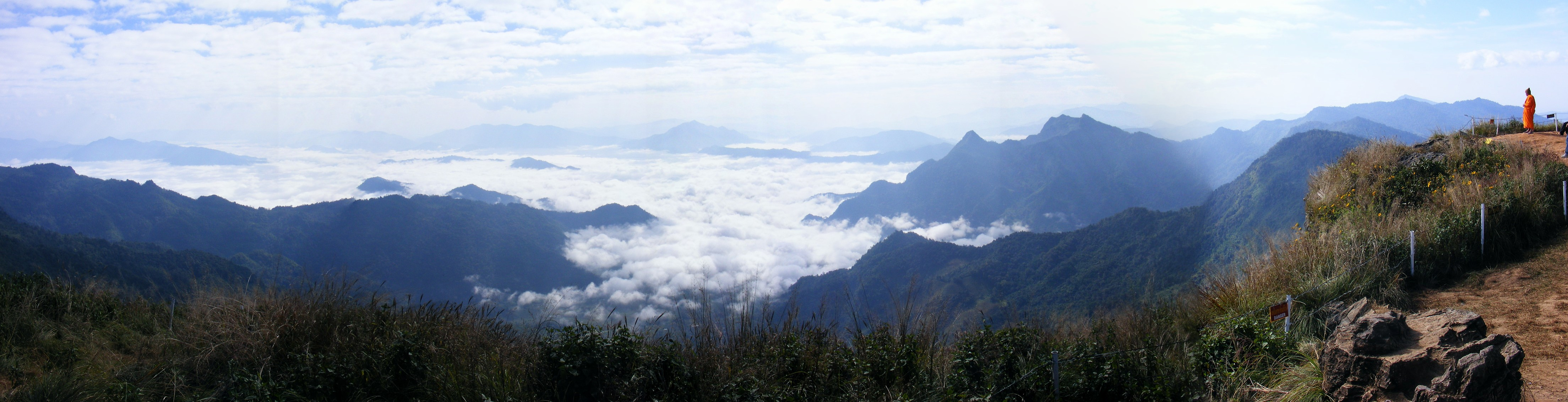
View from Phu Chi Fa forest park, Chiang Rai Province

Forest parks (Thai: วนอุทยาน, RTGS: wanutthayan) in Thailand are protected areas set aside for conservation and protection from development owing to their natural scenic value that are too small to be declared national parks. The forest parks are managed by the fourteen protected areas regional offices and two branches. Thailand's forest parks fall under IUCN Category V, Protected Landscape. There are a total of some 117 Forest Parks in Thailand, 91 are published in the Government Gazette, covering a combined land surface of 1,751 square kilometres (676 sq mi), which is about a 0.34% of the total area of the country.

Since the first protected area was established in Thailand, their capacity to achieve their purpose has been under multiple challenges. As other protected areas such as national parks and wildlife sanctuaries, forest parks are not free from severe threats such as land encroachment, illegal logging and poaching.

== Thai highlands ==
Name	Province	Area (km^{2})	Date created	DNP	Gazette	Page	PARO
Doi Hua; Mae Kham	Chiang Rai	5.43	20-11-1998		14-12-2020		15
Huai Nam Chang	Chiang Rai	22.39	29-09-2006		09-02-2021		15
Huai Saiman	Chiang Rai	4.11	23-03-2006		14-12-2020		15
Namtok Huai; Mae Sak	Chiang Rai	4.69	08-05-2002		09-02-2021		15
Namtok Huai; Tat Thong	Chiang Rai	3.05	10-03-2006		14-12-2020		15
Namtok Khun; Nam Yab	Chiang Rai	5.20	10-03-2006		14-12-2020		15
Namtok Mae Salong	Chiang Rai	3.87	29-09-2006		14-12-2020		15
Namtok Si Chomphu	Chiang Rai	12.42	23-03-2006		14-12-2020		15
Namtok Tat Khwan	Chiang Rai	3.92	08-05-2002		09-02-2021		15
Namtok Tat Sairung	Chiang Rai	6.54			14-12-2020		15
Namtok Tat Sawan	Chiang Rai	3.10			14-12-2020		15
Namtok Wang Than; Thong	Chiang Rai	12.35	15-10-2003		14-12-2020		15
Phaya Phiphak	Chiang Rai	6.08	04-05-1999		14-12-2020		15
San Pha Phaya Phrai	Chiang Rai	5.42	20-11-1997		14-12-2020		15
Tham Pha Lae	Chiang Rai	5.89			14-12-2020		15
Doi Wiang Kaeo	Lamphun	20.93	01-10-1989		09-02-2021		16
Kaeo Komon	Mae Hong Son	0.34	16-07-1996		09-02-2021		16BR
Mai Sak Yai	Mae Hong Son	24.29			09-02-2021		16BR
Namtok Huai; Mae Saed	Mae Hong Son	10.68			14-12-2020		16BR
Namtok Klo Kho	Mae Hong Son	8.91	22-06-2006		14-12-2020		16BR
Namtok Mae Sawan; Noi	Mae Hong Son	4.06	23-03-1998		14-12-2020		16BR
Namtok Mae; Yuam Luang	Mae Hong Son	1.97			09-02-2021		16BR
Namtok Mai Sang; Nam	Mae Hong Son	15.00	22-06-2006		14-12-2020		16BR
Pha Hin Tang	Mae Hong Son	5.53	13-01-1997		14-12-2020		16BR
Tham Tara Lod	Mae Hong Son	3.80			09-02-2021		16BR
Thung Bua Tong	Mae Hong Son	6.24	21-07-1999		14-12-2020		16BR
Khao Luang	Nakhon Sawan; Uthai Thani	15.20	22-02-1996		24-12-2020		12
Tham Phet- Tham Thong	Nakhon Sawan	7.52	10-01-1997		14-12-2020		12
Tham Pha Tub	Nan	1.20	01-10-1978		24-12-2020		13
Namtok Nam Min	Phayao	5.98			09-02-2021		15
Rong Kham Luang	Phayao	12.34			14-12-2020		15
Bueng Sam Phan	Phetchabun	9.00	14-08-2014		14-12-2020		11
Dong Charoen	Phetchabun	15.28	14-08-2014		09-02-2021		11
Khao Rang	Phetchabun	54.00	07-10-2014		09-02-2021		11
Wang Tha Dee	Phetchabun	21.23	14-08-2014		09-02-2021		11
Nakhon Chai Bowon	Phichit	1.83	25-07-1989		24-12-2020		12
Doi Mon Kaeo- Mon Deng	Phrae	0.58			24-12-2020		13
Phae Mueang Phi	Phrae	0.34	04-03-1981		24-12-2020		13
Pha Lak Muen	Phrae	6.24			14-12-2020		13
Tham Lom- Tham Wang	Sukhothai	11.75	23-01-1983		14-12-2020		14
Namtok Pa La Tha	Tak	2.77			09-02-2021		14
Phra Tat Huai Luek	Tak	4.32			14-12-2020		14
Tham Ta Kho Bi	Tak	8.91	29-09-2006		14-12-2020		14
Huai Khot	Uthai Thani	20.64	23-07-2014		09-02-2021		12
Tham Khao Wong	Uthai Thani	14.40	09-12-2001		14-12-2020		12
Huai Nam Lee	Uttaradit	17.62	14-08-2014		14-12-2020		11
Khao Phlueng- Ban Dan	Uttaradit	57.84	14-08-2014		09-02-2021		11
Namtok Mae Choey	Uttaradit	19.60	14-08-2014		09-02-2021		11

=== Not yet published in the Government Gazette ===
Name	Province	Area (km^{2})	Date created	DNP	PARO
Cha Phanpee	Chiang Rai	1.07	23-03-2006		15
Doi Kat Pee	Chiang Rai	1.32			15
Doi Phra Bat	Chiang Rai	4.80			15
Mae Salong	Chiang Rai	2.27			15
Namtok Bua Tong- Namphu Chet Si	Chiang Rai	15.00	10-09-1994		15
Namtok Don Sila	Chiang Rai	4.80	23-03-2006		15
Namtok Huai Kang Pla	Chiang Rai				15
Namtok Huai Nam Un	Chiang Rai	1.08			15
Namtok Mae Tho	Chiang Rai	6.40	09-11-1997		15
Namtok Mi O Cho Dael	Chiang Rai	24.66	23-03-2006		15
Phu Chi Fa	Chiang Rai	4.00	06-02-1998		15
Phu Chom Dao	Chiang Rai				15
Rim Khong	Chiang Rai	6.00			15
Tham Luang- Khun Nam Nang Non	Chiang Rai	8.00	01-10-1986		15
Mon Phraya Chae	Lampang	29.73	21-10-1969		13BR
Phu Langka	Phayao	12.48	08-05-2002		15
Keang Huai Tak	Tak	21.00			14
Namtok Huai Mae Khai	Tak	11.20			14
Ton Sak Yai	Uttaradit	35.20	01-10-1969		13
Wang Yao	Uttaradit	9.21	14-08-2014		13

== Northeast ==
Name	Province	Area (km^{2})	Date created	DNP	Gazette	Page	PARO
Phu Sing– Phu Pha Phueng	Amnat Charoen	24.22	26-08-1996		24-12-2020		9
Phu Faek	Kalasin	10.65	27-01-1997		05-01-2021		8
Phu Pha Wua	Kalasin	6.56	20-02-1996		05-01-2021		8
Phu Phra	Kalasin	15.61	01-10-1983		05-01-2021		8
Namtok Ba Luang	Khon Kaen	4.10	01-10-1983		05-01-2021		8
Phu Han– Phu Ra-ngam	Khon Kaen	9.98			05-01-2021		8
Harirak	Loei	9.17	17-09-1990		05-01-2021		8
Namtok Huai Lao	Loei	2.68	01-09-1997		24-12-2020		8
Pha Ngam	Loei	21.23	13-05-2002		05-01-2021		8
Phu Bo Bit	Loei	6.56	10-04-1996		05-01-2021		8
Phu Pha Lom	Loei	15.61	15-03-1996		05-01-2021		8
Tham Saeng; Tham Phrommawat	Loei	21.23	28-04-1988		05-01-2021		8
Chi Long	Maha Sarakham	0.21	24-04-1982		24-12-2020		8
Ko Sam Phi	Maha Sarakham	0.28	01-10-1976		24-12-2020		8
Dong Bang Yi	Mukdahan	3.79	08-08-1995		05-01-2021		9
Bua Ban	Nong Bua; Lamphu	4.85	25-09-2006		14-12-2020		10
Namtok Than Tip	Nong Khai	6.14	01-05-1995		14-12-2020		10
Phu Pha Daen	Sakon Nakhon	44.93			24-12-2020		10
Pason Nong Khu	Surin	0.67	29-10-1981		24-12-2020		9
Phanom Sawai	Surin	3.46	22-06-1984		05-01-2021		9
Namtok Pha Luang	Ubon; Ratchathani	20.79	04-09-1995		05-01-2021		9
Namtok Khoi Nang	Udon Thani	100.58	19-12-1984		24-12-2020		10
Phu Khao; Suan Kwang	Udon Thani	35.98	2006		09-02-2021		10
Wang Sam Mo	Udon Thani	3.33	19-01-1984		14-12-2020		10

=== Not yet published in the Government Gazette ===
Name	Province	Area (km^{2})	Date created	DNP	PARO
Khao Kradong	Buri Ram	2.15	01-10-1983		9
Phu Hin Chom Tat	Udon Thani		25-09-2006		10
Phu Pha Daeng	Udon Thani; Nong Bua Lamphu	17.87	03-05-1996		10
Phu Phra Bat Buabok	Udon Thani	11.42	20-02-1996		10

== Central-East ==
Name	Province	Area (km^{2})	Date created	DNP	Gazette	Page	PARO
Khao Laem Sing	Chanthaburi	15.49	25-10-1983		05-01-2021		2
Namtok Khao Chao; Bo Thong	Chonburi	37.21	02-03-1997		24-12-2020		2
Phra Thaen Dong; Rang	Kanchanaburi	2.35	28-10-1982		24-12-2020		3
Cha-am	Phetchaburi	0.54	04-03-1992		09-02-2021		3BR
Khao Nang; Phanthurat	Phetchaburi	3.21	25-02-1999		05-01-2021		3BR
Huai Nam Sap	Prachuap; Khiri Khan	3.87			05-01-2021		3BR
Khao Ta Monglai	Prachuap; Khiri Khan	1.36	11-09-1997		09-02-2021		3BR
Pran Buri	Prachuap; Khiri Khan	1.47	30-09-1982		09-02-2021		3BR
Thao Kosa	Prachuap; Khiri Khan	0.32	28-07-2000		09-02-2021		3BR
Tham Khao Noi	Ratchaburi	7.26	15-11-1991		05-01-2021		3
Phu Muang	Suphan Buri	2.79	26-12-1984		24-12-2020		3

=== Not yet published in the Government Gazette ===
Name	Province	Area (km^{2})	Date created	DNP	PARO
Klang Ao	Prachuap Khiri khan	2.00	01-10-1974		3BR
Mae Ramphueng	Prachuap Khiri Khan	7.00	16-01-2002		3BR

== South ==
Name	Province	Area (km^{2})	Date created	DNP	Gazette	Page	PARO
Namtok Kapo	Chumphon	1.09	01-10-1958		24-12-2020		4
Namtok Raman	Phang Nga	0.60	24-10-1983		24-12-2020		5
Sa Nang Manora	Phang Nga	0.38	15-09-1980		24-12-2020		5
Mueang Kao; Chai Buri	Phatthalung	2.73	21-08-2001		24-12-2020		6
Khuan Khao Wang	Songkhla	3.20	12-09-1995		05-01-2021		6
Namtok Thara; Sawan	Satun	17.87	23-07-1996		05-01-2021		5
Bo Namron; Kantang	Trang	0.52	1967		24-12-2020		5
Namtok Phan	Trang	12.83	29-09-1997		05-01-2021		5

== Notes ==
PARO: Protected Areas Regional Office is the management area of the following offices:

- PARO 2 - Si Racha
- PARO 3 - Ban Pong
- PARO 4 - Surat Thani
- PARO 5 - Nakhon Si Thammarat
- PARO 6 - Songkhla
- PARO 8 - Khon Kaen
- PARO 9 - Ubon Ratchathani
- PARO 10 - Udon Thani
- PARO 11 - Phitsanulok
- PARO 12 - Nakhon Sawan
- PARO 13 - Phrae
- PARO 14 - Tak
- PARO 15 - Chiang Rai
- PARO 16 - Chiang Mai
- PARO 3 - Phetchaburi Branch
- PARO 16 - Mae Sariang Branch

Keyword for forest park names:

- 34x Namtok - waterfall
- 16x Phu - mountain
- 10x Tham - cave
- 8x Khao - Hill/mountain
- 4x Doi - mountain
- 4x Huai - creek
- 3x Pha - cliff
- 3x Wang - palace
- 2x Dong - jungle
- 1x Bo namron - hot spring
- 1x Bueng - marsh/swamp
- 1x Khuan - clay hill
- 1x Namphu - fountain
- 1x Pa - forest
- 1x Pason - pine forest
- 1x Phanom - hill
- 1x Rong - groove
- 1x Sa - pool
