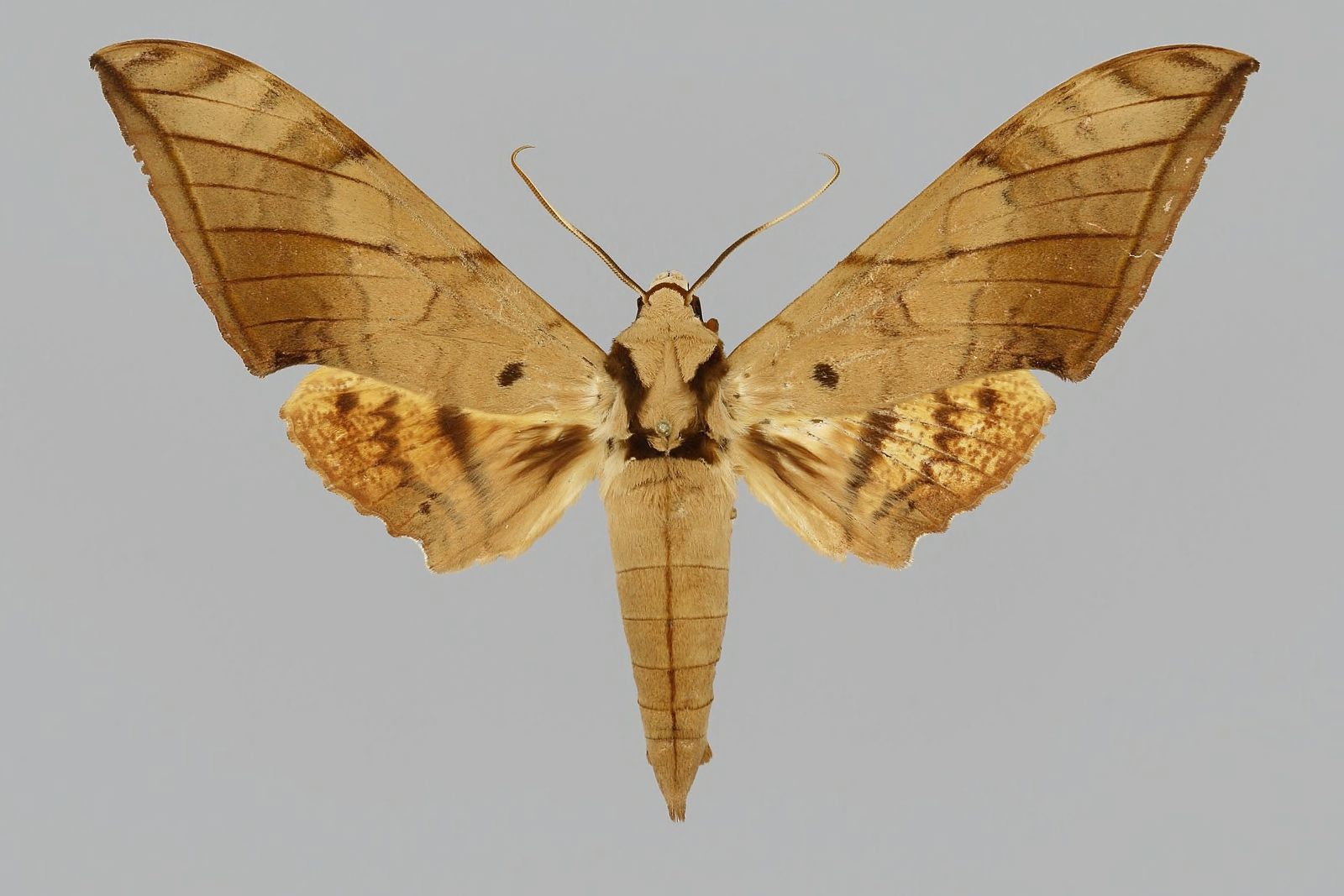
- Male

Scientific classification
- Kingdom: Animalia
- Phylum: Arthropoda
- Class: Insecta
- Order: Lepidoptera
- Family: Sphingidae
- Genus: Ambulyx
- Species: A. siamensis

Binomial name
- Ambulyx siamensis Inoue, 1991

= Ambulyx siamensis =

Species of moth

Ambulyx siamensis is a species of moth of the family Sphingidae first described by Hiroshi Inoue in 1991. It is known from Yunnan in south-western China and from Thailand.

The larvae have been recorded feeding on Shorea obtusa in Thailand.
