= Phu Wua Wildlife Sanctuary =

Thailand wildfire sanctuary

- IUCN category IV (habitat/species management area)
- Location within Thailand
- Location: Bueng Kan Province, Thailand
- Coordinates: 18°10′N 103°59′E
- Area: 186.5 km^{2} (72.0 sq mi)
- Established: 1975
- Governing body: Wildlife Conservation Office

Phu Wua (Thai: ภูวัว; Northeastern Thai: ภูงัว) is a wildlife sanctuary in northeastern Thailand, in Bueng Kan Province. It covers an area of 186.5 km^{2} of the districts Seka and Bung Khla.

== Features ==
The wildlife preserve covers forested hills along the Mekong River, ranging between 160 and 448 m elevation. The highest hill is Phu Wua Lang Tham Sung. Shorea obtusa is the most common tree. The dry and wet virgin forests are interspersed with bamboo forests and grasslands. Wildlife of the sanctuary includes elephants, tigers, leopards, bears, pheasants, monkeys, and gibbons.

The area was first surveyed in 1964, but the survey was halted due to the growing communist insurgency in the area. It took till 1974 for the forestry department to complete the survey and report the results to the government. On 2 May 1975 it was established as a wildlife sanctuary by royal decree.

== Location ==
Phu Wua Wildlife Sanctuary in overview PARO 10 (Udon Thani)

8) Phu Wua Wildlife Sanctuary in overview PARO 10 (Udon Thani)

	National park
1	Na Yung–Nam Som
2	Phu Hin Chom That–Phu Phra Bat
3	Phu Kao-Phu Phan Kham
4	Phu Langka
5	Phu Pha Lek
6	Phu Phan
7	Phu Pha Yon

	Wildlife sanctuary
8	Phu Wua
	Non-hunting area
9	Bueng Khong Long
10	Kutting
11	Nong Han Kumphawapi
12	Nong Hua Khu

	Forest park
13	Bua Ban
14	Namtok Khoi Nang
15	Namtok Than Thip
16	Phu Khao Suan Kwang
17	Phu Pha Daen
18	Wang Sam Mo
