= Na Yung–Nam Som National Park =

National park in Thailand

Na Yung-Nam Som National Park
- อุทยานแห่งชาตินายูง-น้ำโสม
- IUCN category II (national park)
- Location within Thailand
- Location: Udon Thani Province, Thailand
- Coordinates: 17°53′47.85″N 102°9′0.259″E
- Area: 397 km^{2} (153 sq mi)
- Established: 1975
- Visitors: 8,357 (in 2019)
- Governing body: Department of National Parks, Wildlife and Plant Conservation

Na Yung–Nam Som National Park (Thai: อุทยานแห่งชาตินายูง-น้ำโสม) is a national park in Nam Som District, Udon Thani Province, Thailand.

== Geography ==
Na Yung–Nam Som National Park is in the area where Udon Thani, Loei, and Nong Khai Provinces meet. The topography condition is slope complex mountainous above 200–500 m in elevation. The highest peak is Phu Ya-u at about 588 m. The forest condition is still abundant. The park is the main source of the area's rivers and streams, such as Huai Nam Som and Huai Tat Ton. Soils are sandy loam in dry evergreen and mixed deciduous forests and lateritic soils in dry dipterocarp forests. Most of the rocks found are sandstone.

== History ==
The area became a forest park in December 1975. As of 2022 it is still a national park in preparation, with an area of 248,259 rai ~ 397 square kilometres (153 sq mi).

== Climate ==
Due to the monsoon, summers are hot, about 40 °C between March and May. The rainy season runs from June to October and the winter from November to February with the temperature of about 10-20 °C. Rainfall is about 1,000-1,500 mm yearly.

== Flora and fauna ==
Forest conditions are dry dipterocarp forests distributed along foothills and hill ranges. The main species are Shorea obtasa, S. siamensis, and Dipterocarpus tuberculatus. Lower plants are Vietnamosasa pusilla, Curcuma sp. Down the valley is mixed deciduous forest, Dalbergia oliveri, Xylia xylocarpa, Pterocarpus macrocarpus, Sindora siamensis, and various species of bamboo such as Gigantochloa albocilliata, Bambusa bambos, Dendrocalamus sp. are found. Along the riverside is dry evergreen forest, Afzelia xylocarpa Anisoptera costata, Dipterocarpus spp. Lagerstoemia spp., Hopea sp. Symbiosis species like orchid and fern are present. Undergrowth species are rattan, palm, and herbs.

== Sights ==
=== Pha Daeng Viewpoint ===
Pha Daeng viewpoint is about 1,500 m from the national park office. Along the nature trail to Yung Thong Waterfall, Pha Daeng is sandstone slope cliff, where a large beautiful lower scenery can be observed. Next to Pha Daeng, there is a tiny cave that used to be a meditation site for Luang Pu Man Phurithatto. Yung Thong Waterfall Nature Trail passes Yung Thong and Tat Noi Waterfalls and Pha Daeng Viewpoint for 2,000 m.

== Location ==
Na Yung-Nam Som National Park in overview PARO 10 (Udon Thani)

1) Na Yung Nam Som National Park in overview PARO 10 (Udon Thani)

	National park
1	Na Yung–Nam Som
2	Phu Hin Chom That–Phu Phra Bat
3	Phu Kao–Phu Phan Kham
4	Phu Langka
5	Phu Pha Lek
6	Phu Phan
7	Phu Pha Yon

	Wildlife sanctuary
8	Phu Wua
	Non-hunting area
9	Bueng Khong Long
10	Kutting
11	Nong Han Kumphawapi
12	Nong Hua Khu

	Forest park
13	Bua Ban
14	Namtok Khoi Nang
15	Namtok Than Thip
16	Phu Khao Suan Kwang
17	Phu Pha Daen
18	Wang Sam Mo

== See also ==
- List of national parks of Thailand
- List of Protected Areas Regional Offices of Thailand
