= Phu Phan Mountains =

Mountain range in Thailand

- ทิวเขาภูพาน
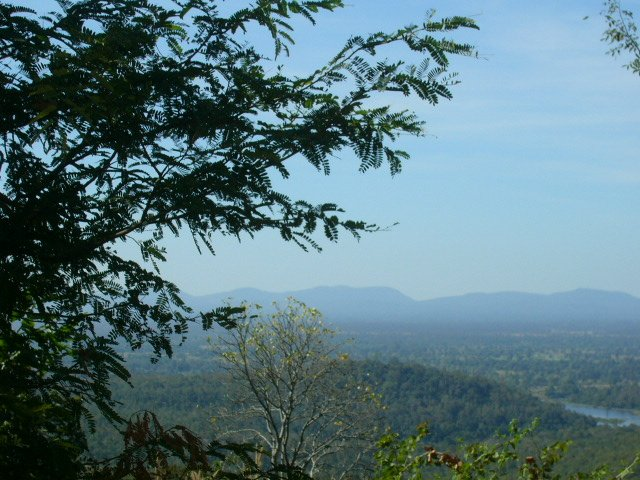
- Phu Phan Mountains, view from Wat Tham Kham

Highest point
- Peak: Phu Lang Ka
- Elevation: 624 m (2,047 ft)
- Coordinates: 16°46′22″N 104°21′45″E

Dimensions
- Length: 180 km (110 mi) NW/SE
- Width: 50 km (31 mi) NE/SW

Geography
- Map of Isan showing the Phu Phan Range
- Country: Thailand
- Regions: Nong Bua Lamphu; Udon Thani; Sakon Nakhon; Nakhon Phanom; Kalasin; Roi Et; Maha Sarakham; Mukdahan

Geology
- Rock age: Early Cretaceous
- Rock type(s): Sandstone and siltstone

The Phu Phan Mountains (Thai: ทิวเขาภูพาน, RTGS: Thio Khao Phu Phan, pronounced [tʰīw kʰǎw pʰūː pʰāːn]; Northeastern Thai: ทิวเขาภูพาน, pronounced [tʰîw kʰǎw pʰûː pʰâːn]) are a range of hills dividing the Khorat Plateau of the Isan region of Thailand into two basins: the northern Sakhon Nakhon Basin, and the southern Khorat Basin.

The silhouette of the Phu Phan Mountains appears in the provincial seal of Kalasin since they form the northern boundary of the province.

The Phu Phan Mountains are among the places in Thailand more severely affected by the Illegal logging of Phayung (Siamese Rosewood) trees. Although officially a protected tree, the cutting and trading of the endangered rosewood trees has been going unabated in Thailand's mountainous forested zones, even in the protected areas. In Thailand and in China this wood is highly valued in the furniture industry.

== Etymology ==
The name of the range is derived from the characteristic tabletop shape of its peaks, for phan is a kind of traditional tray on a pedestal.

Phu is the word for mountain in the Isan/Lao language (as opposed to khao in central and southern Thai and doi in northern Thai).

== Geography ==
The Phu Phan Mountains rise above the plateau and are not prominent. They straddle most of the provinces of northern and eastern Isan, including Khon Kaen, Nong Bua Lamphu, Udon Thani, Sakon Nakhon, Nakhon Phanom, Kalasin, Roi Et, Maha Sarakham, and Mukdahan Province.

The highest elevation of the Phu Phan Range is the 641 m high summit known as Phu Lang Ka. It is in Nakhon Phanom Province. Other important peaks are 624 m high Phu Mai Hia in Mukdahan Province and the 563 m high summit known as Phu Langka Nuea in Nakhon Phanom Province.

The hills are mostly deforested, although patches covered with mixed deciduous forest remain in zones spread across the range.

Phu Phan Royal Palace is in the area, as is the Nam Un dam. Other local sights are Lake Nong Han near Sakon Nakhon and the Khmer-style chedi ruins of Phu Phek, dating from 1050.

== Protected areas ==
The area of the Phu Phan Mountains includes national parks and other protected areas:

- Phu Phan National Park
- Phu Wiang National Park
- Than Ngam Forest Park
- Kosam Phi Forest Park
- Nam Phong National Park
- Phu Faek Forest Park
- Phu Kao–Phu Phan Kham National Park
- Phu Pha Lek National Park
- Huai Huat National Park (Phu Pha Yon)
- Phu Phra Bat Buabok Forest Park

== See also ==
- Khok Kruat Formation
