= Phra That Phu Pek =

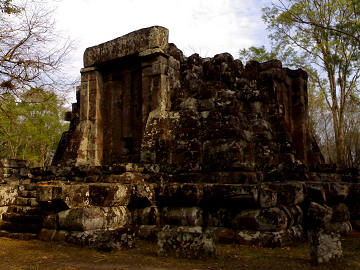

- Location in Thailand

Religion
- Affiliation: Hinduism
- Province: Sakon Nakhon

Location
- Country: Thailand
- Coordinates: 17.192068°N 103.937294°E

Architecture
- Type: Khmer
- Completed: 16th-17th Buddhist century

Phra That Phu Pek (Thai:พระธาตุภูเพ็ก) is an ancient temple in Sakon Nakhon Province, in the Isan region of Thailand. This ancient Khmer ruin was built from sandstone, standing on a laterite base. This is a Buddhist temple ruin of Khmer origin in the form of a chedi, it was built in the 16th-17th Buddhist century. The ruin is special as it houses a solar calendar, a cube-shaped rock, in its stupa. The ancients used it for indicating the position of the sun, important for religious rites and agricultural seasons.

Phra That Phu Pek is in tambon Na Hua Bo, Phanna Nikhom district, Sakon Nakhon Province of northeastern Thailand, about 37 km west of the town of Sakon Nakhon. The temple is in Phu Phan National Park, in the Phu Phan Mountains. To get there, take the Sakon Nakhon-Udon Thani road for 22 kilometres and take a road on the left for 14 kilometres, then ascend 491 steps. The laterite pagoda is on a square base, seemingly unfinished because it has no roof or pagoda top.
