= Phu Pha Yon National Park =

National park in Thailand

- IUCN category II (national park)
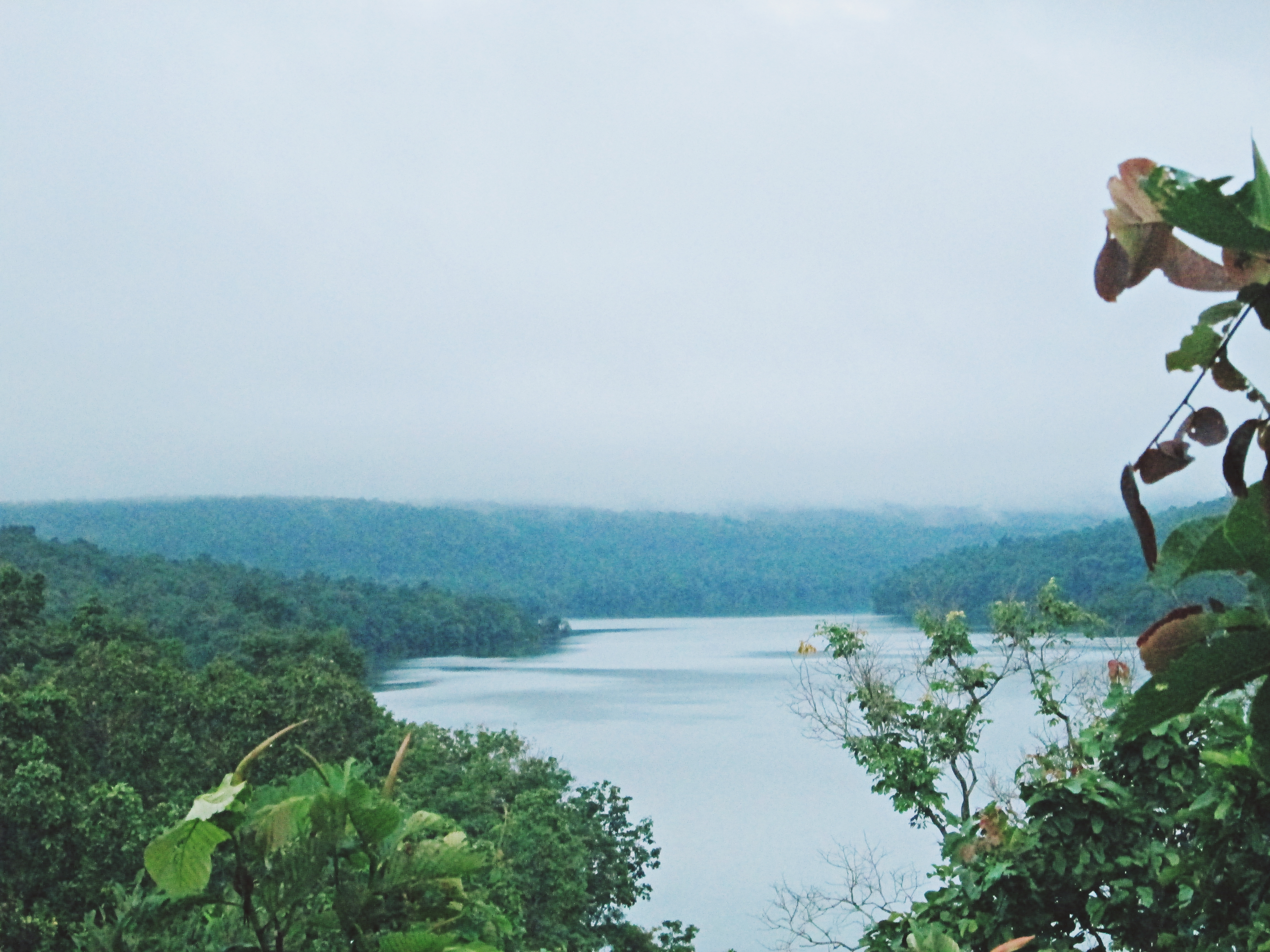
- Huai Huad reservoir, Phu Pha Yon national park
- Interactive map of Phu Pha Yon National Park
- Location: Ban Huai Huad, Chan Phen, Tao Ngoi, Sakon Nakhon
- Nearest town: Tao Ngoi, Sakon Nakhon
- Coordinates: 16°58′58″N 104°04′10″E
- Area: 829 km^{2} (320 sq mi)
- Established: July 28, 1988; 37 years ago
- Visitors: 5,025 (in 2019)
- Governing body: Department of National Parks, Wildlife and Plant Conservation

Phu Pha Yon National Park (Thai: อุทยานแห่งชาติภูผายล) is a national park in northeastern Thailand (Isan). Formerly known as Huai Huad National Park (อุทยานแห่งชาติห้วยหวด). The national park covers the area of Mueang Sakon Nakhon, Khok Si Suphan and Tao Ngoi districts of Sakon Nakhon province, Na Kae district of Nakhon Phanom province and Dong Luang, Khamcha-i districts of Mukdahan province.

It was established in 1988 as the 57th national park in Thailand and renamed as present day in 2001.

The park is part of Phu Phan range, the overall area is 517,850 rai ~ 829 square kilometres (320 sq mi). Its terrain is the highland of 300–600 m (984–19,68 ft) above mean sea level hemmed by high mountains and the sandstone mouth which is the water source among the nice and natural scenery such as cave, stone hill, cliff, reservoir. Wildlife animals that are found and lived here include barking deer, sambar deer, wild boar, dhole and various birds etc.

The highlights are fields full of various types of wildflowers such as blackfoot daisy, Utricularia delphinioides (endemic), Osbeckia stellata, bladderwort, sundew that bloom at the same time during the rainy season, geometric ancient engraving paints inside the Phra Dan Raeng cave, Hiib Phu Pha Nang cave, Saowapa cave, Dong Noi water reservoir and Phra Wet cave as well as beautiful scenic point.

Several main local watercourses originate at this park.

Entrance fee: adult 20 baht, child 10 baht for Thai, adult 100 baht, child 50 baht for foreigner, motorbike 20 baht, 4-wheel vehicle 30 baht. The national park offers a convenience store and eatery with campsite as well as camping equipments.

Phu Lek Fai, a hill in the area of Ban Kokkok, Dong Luang district, Mukdahan province, that used to be a topliner in 2020 from the mysterious murder of a 3-year-old local girl of Phu Thai descent named Nong Chompoo is also part of this national park.

== Location ==
Phu Pha Yon National Park in overview PARO 10 (Udon Thani)

7) Phu Pha Yon National Park in overview PARO 10 (Udon Thani)

	National park
1	Na Yung–Nam Som
2	Phu Hin Chom That–Phu Phra Bat
3	Phu Kao-Phu Phan Kham
4	Phu Langka
5	Phu Pha Lek
6	Phu Phan
7	Phu Pha Yon

	Wildlife sanctuary
8	Phu Wua
	Non-hunting area
9	Bueng Khong Long
10	Kutting
11	Nong Han Kumphawapi
12	Nong Hua Khu

	Forest park
13	Bua Ban
14	Namtok Khoi Nang
15	Namtok Than Thip
16	Phu Khao Suan Kwang
17	Phu Pha Daen
18	Wang Sam Mo

== See also ==
- List of national parks of Thailand
- List of Protected Areas Regional Offices of Thailand
