= Phu Phra Bat Buabok Forest Park =

Forest park in Ban Phue District, Thailand

- วนอุทยานในแพะเมืองผี
- IUCN category V (protected landscape/seascape)
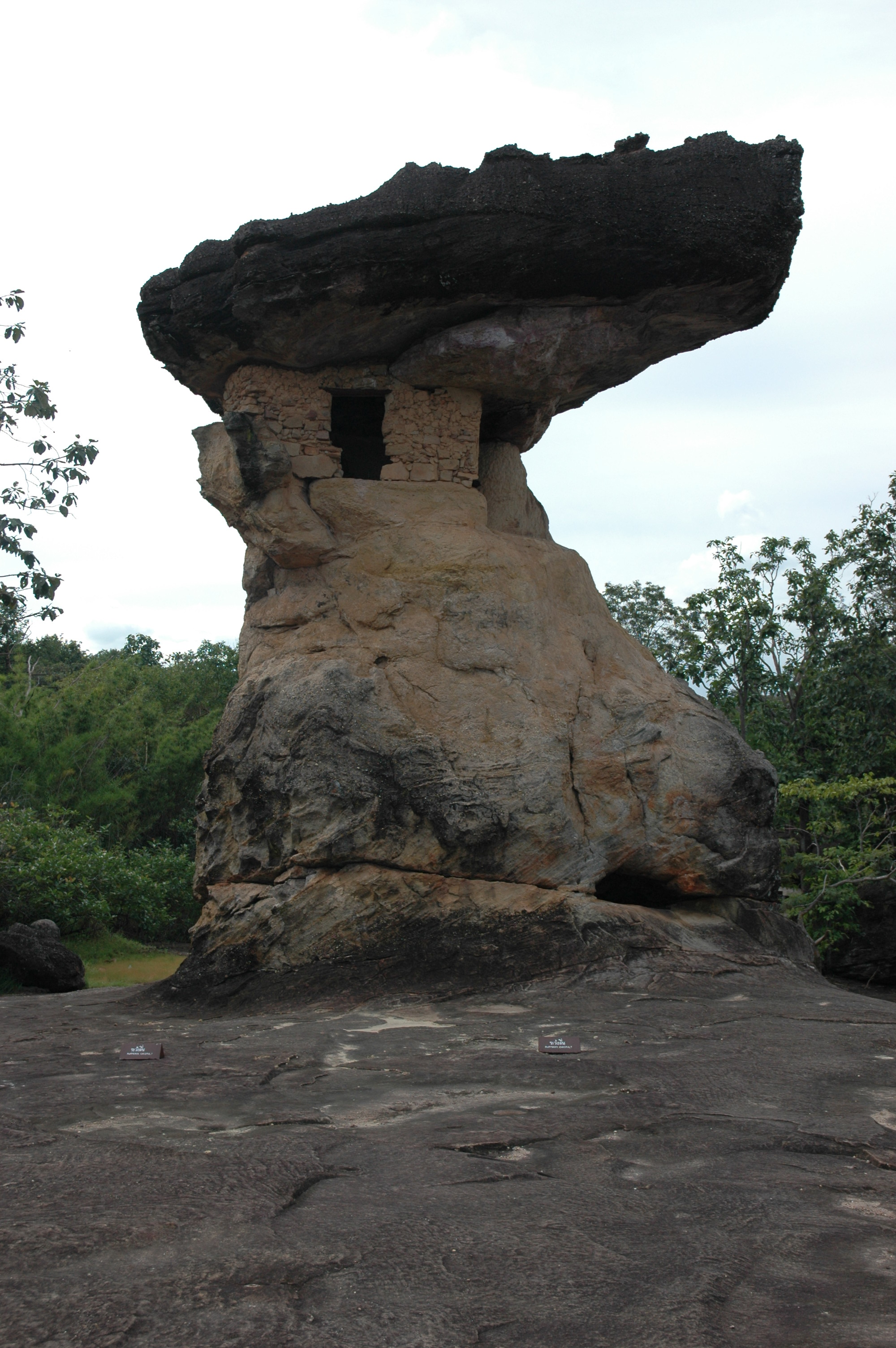
- Rock formation in Phu Phra Bat Buabok

- Location within Thailand
- Location: Thailand
- Nearest city: Udon Thani
- Coordinates: 17°44′0″N 102°21′30″E
- Area: 13 km^{2} (5.0 sq mi)
- Established: 20 February 1996

Phu Phra Bat Buabok (Thai: วนอุทยานในภูพระบาทบัวบก) is a forest park in Ban Phue District, Udon Thani Province, northeast Thailand.

Named after two Buddha footprints carved into rocks in the Lan Xang style, the park is on a disconnected sandstone hill in the western area of the Phu Phan mountains. The hill tops at 352 m (1,155 ft) elevation, and extends 9 km (5.6 mi)in the north–south direction and 2 km (1.2 mi) in the east–west direction. Three major kinds of forest are found at the hill: dry dipterocarp forest at the foothills, mixed deciduous forest in the plain surrounding the hill, and dry evergreen forest on the hill itself.

The park covers an area of 13 km^{2} (5.0 sq mi) of the Pa Kua Num Forest Reserve. It was officially gazetted on 20 February 1996. 5.4 km^{2} (2.1 sq mi) of the area form the Phu Phra Bat Historical Park, established in 1981, covering the 81 cultural sites on the hill at the rock outcrops.

The forest park together with the historical park have been on the tentative list of future World Heritage Sites since 2004.

== See also ==
- List of rock formations
