= Phu Langka Forest Park =

Protected area in Thailand

- วนอุทยานภูลังกา
- IUCN category V (protected landscape/seascape)
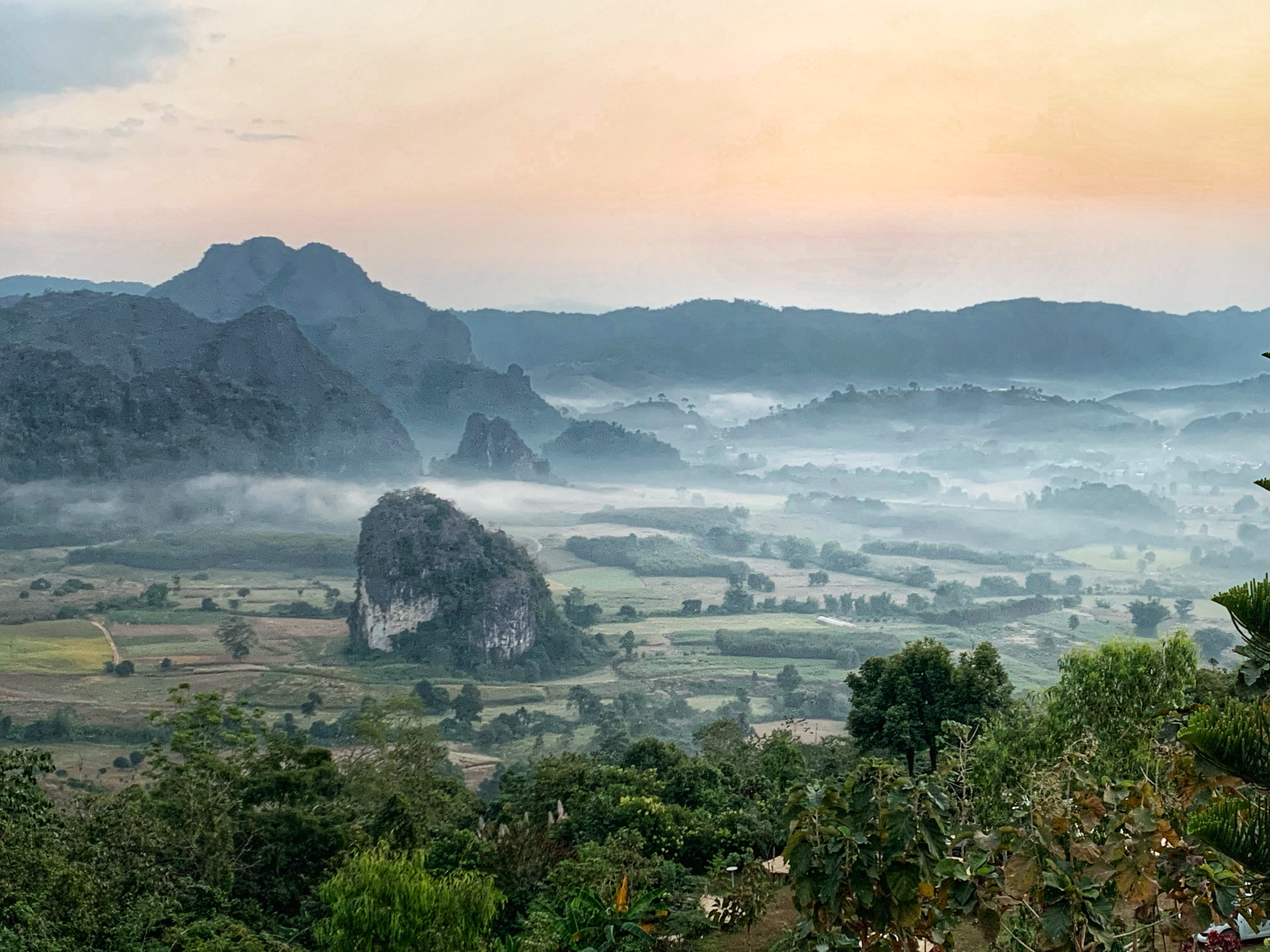
- Pha Chang Noi (little elephant mount) amongst the morning fogs at Phu Langka

- Location within Thailand
- Location: Thailand
- Nearest city: Phayao
- Coordinates: 19°27′05″N 100°25′03″E
- Area: 12.48 km^{2} (4.82 sq mi)
- Established: 5 May 2002

The Phu Langka Forest Park, or Phu Lang Ka Forest Park (Thai: วนอุทยานภูลังกา), is a protected area of the Phi Pan Nam Range located in Chiang Kham District and Pong District, Phayao Province, Thailand. The park was established on May 8, 2002, and covers an area of 12.48 km^{2} (4.82 sq mi).

The main attractions of the forest park are the "sea of fog" in the valleys in the early morning and the mountains of Doi Hua Ling, Doi Phu Lang Ka and Doi Phu Nom; the latter is a breast-shaped hill rising in an area of grassland.

The vast pink fields of Dok Khlongkhleng (Melastoma malabathricum; Thai: โคลงเคลงขี้นก) are also one of the interesting sights of the park; other plants that are found in the area include Wightia speciosissima, Colquhounia elegans, Dendrobium heterocarpum, Impatiens mengtszeana and Paris polyphylla. Formerly there had been opium cultivation in these mountains.

Phu Langka Forest Park should not be confused with Phu Langka National Park (อุทยานแห่งชาติภูลังกา) in Nakhon Phanom Province.
