= Sa Nang Manora Forest Park =

Protected area in southern Thailand

- วนอุทยานสระนางมโนราห์
- IUCN category V (protected landscape/seascape)
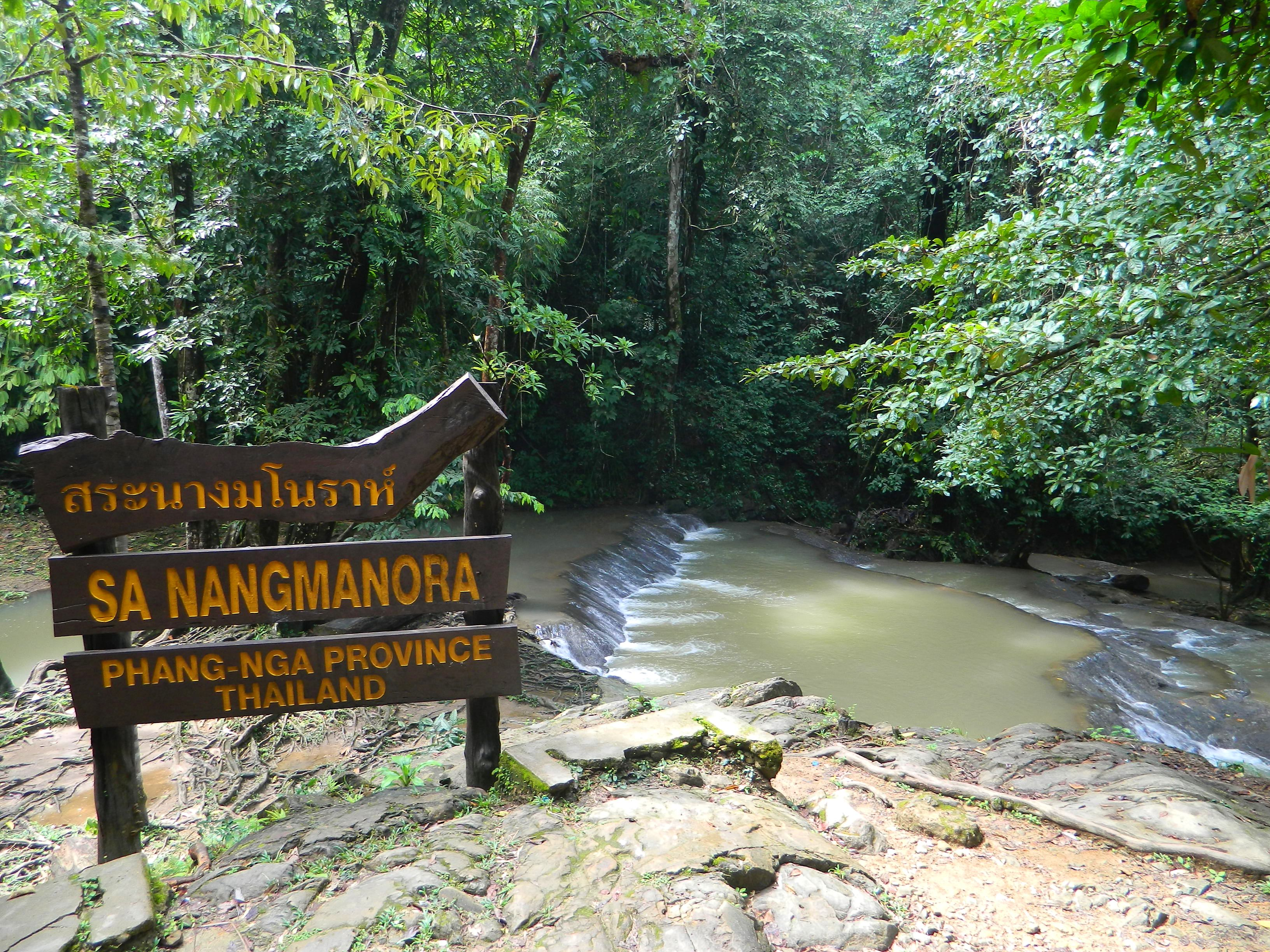

- Location within Thailand
- Location: Thailand
- Nearest city: Phang Nga
- Coordinates: 8°30′38″N 98°32′32″E
- Area: 0.29 km^{2} (0.11 sq mi)
- Established: 15 September 1980

Sa Nang Manora (Thai: สระนางมโนราห์) is a forest park in southern Thailand. It covers an area of 0.29 km^{2} (180 rai) of the Khao Thoi-Nang Hong Forest, Nop Pring Sub-district, Mueang District, Phang Nga Province, about four km north of Phang Nga town. It was established on 15 September 1980.

The park is on mostly plain terrain with few hills, with the Sa Nang Manora waterfall at the hill Khao Thoi. The main trees of the evergreen forest are Sonneratia sp., Eugenia sp., Shorea laevis, Euphorbiaceae sp., Saraca pierreana and Fagaceae sp.

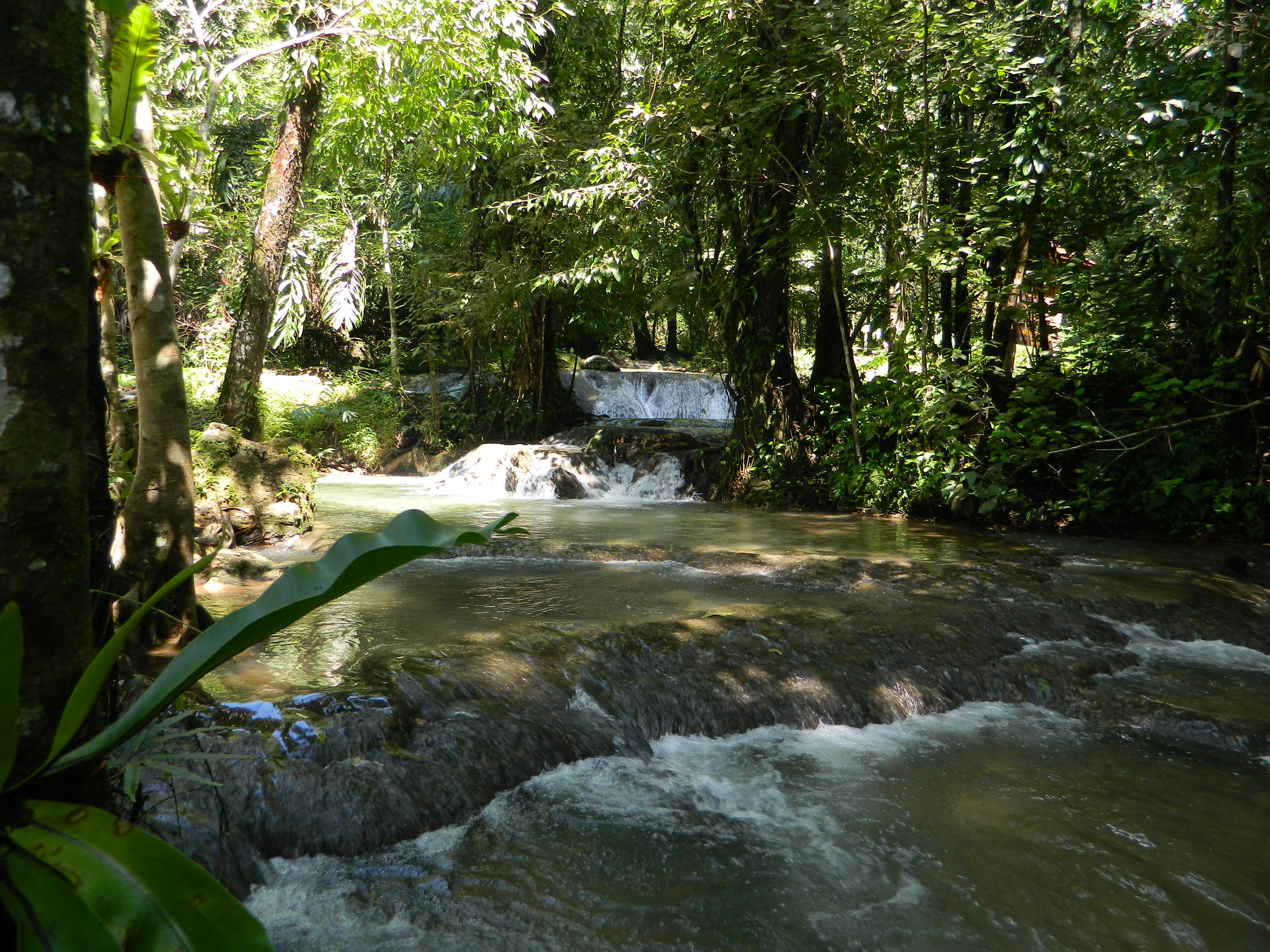
Sa Nang Manora Forest Park

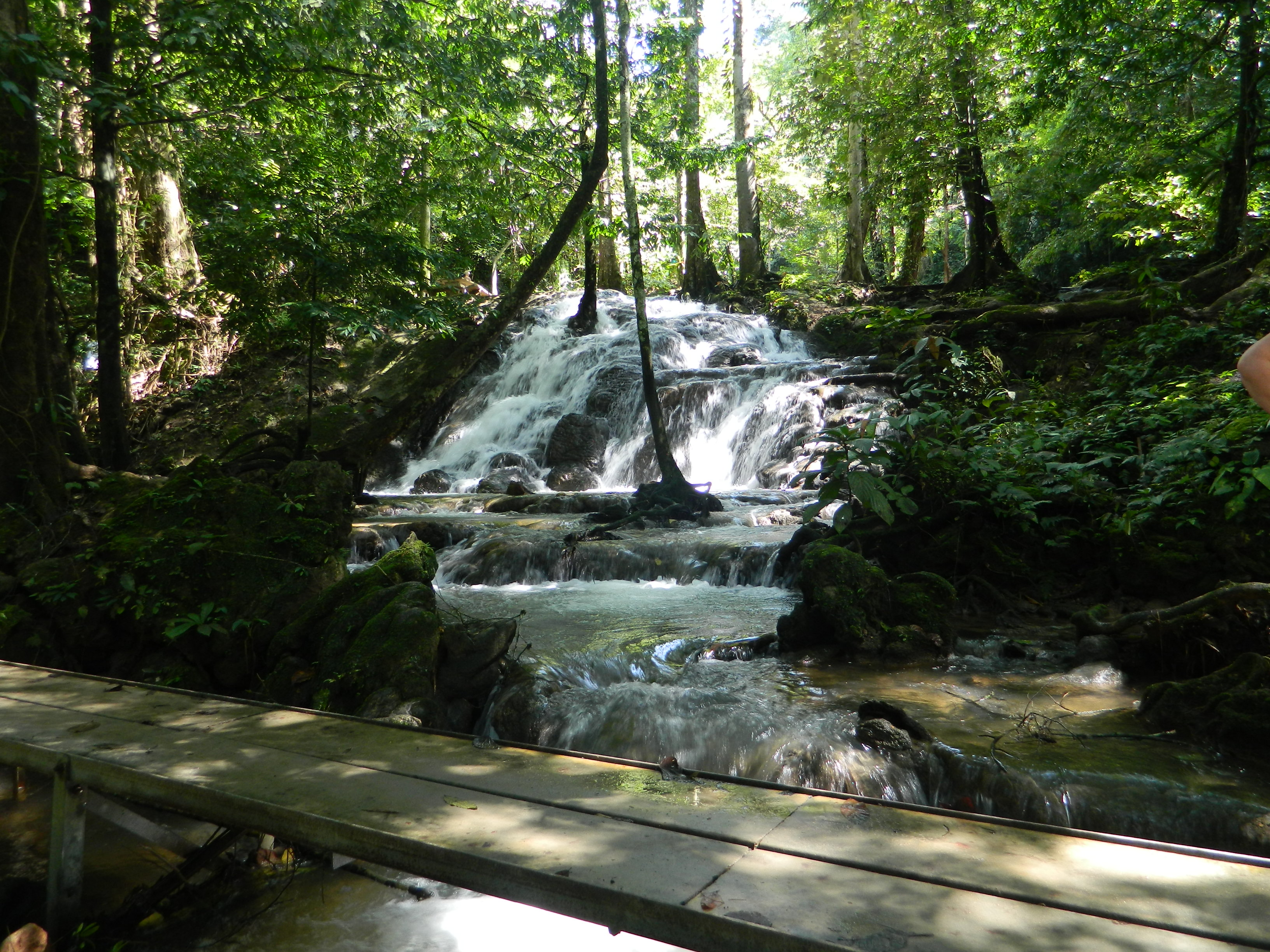
Sa Nang Manora Forest Park

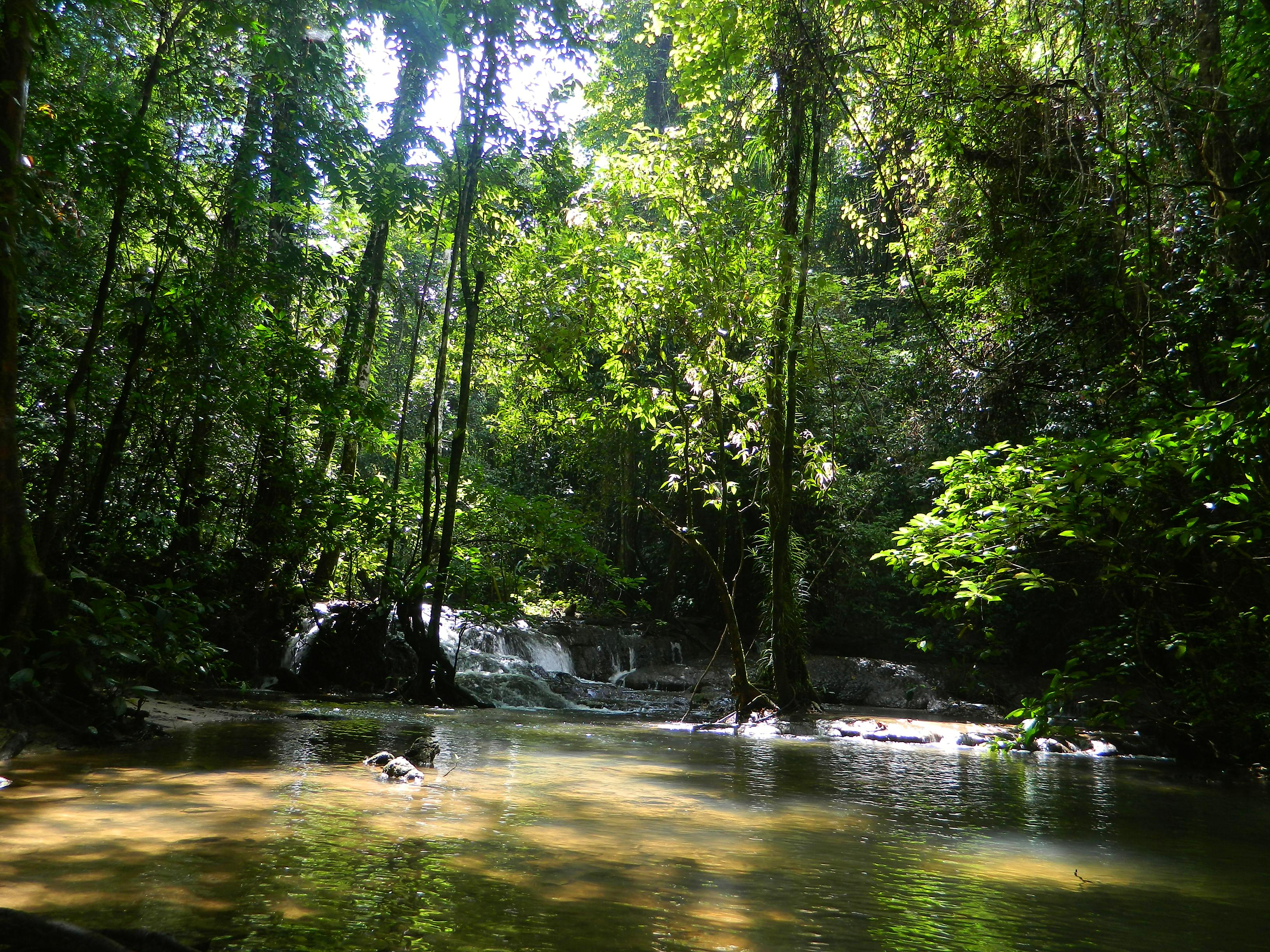
Sa Nang Manora Forest Park

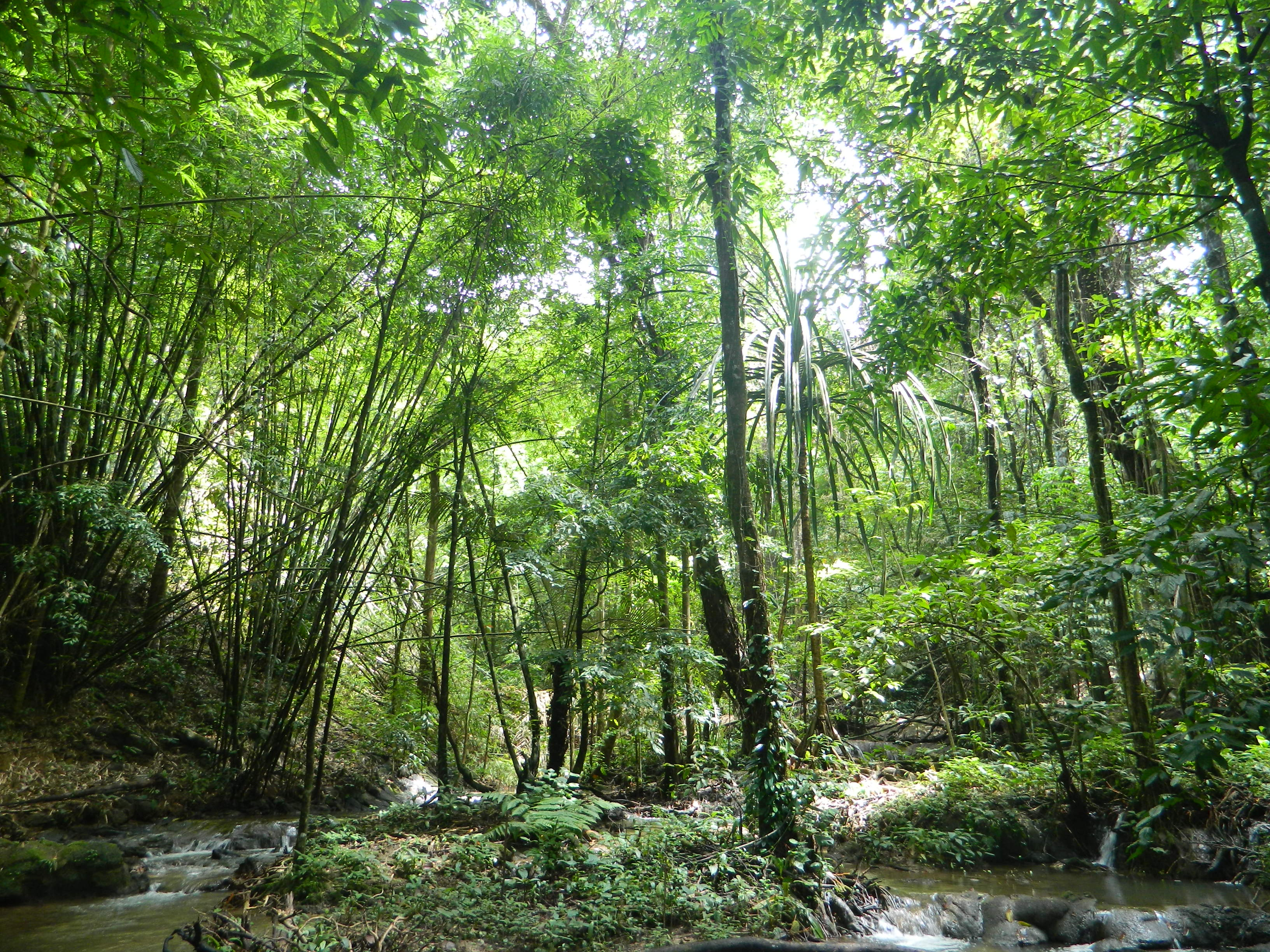
Sa Nang Manora Forest Park

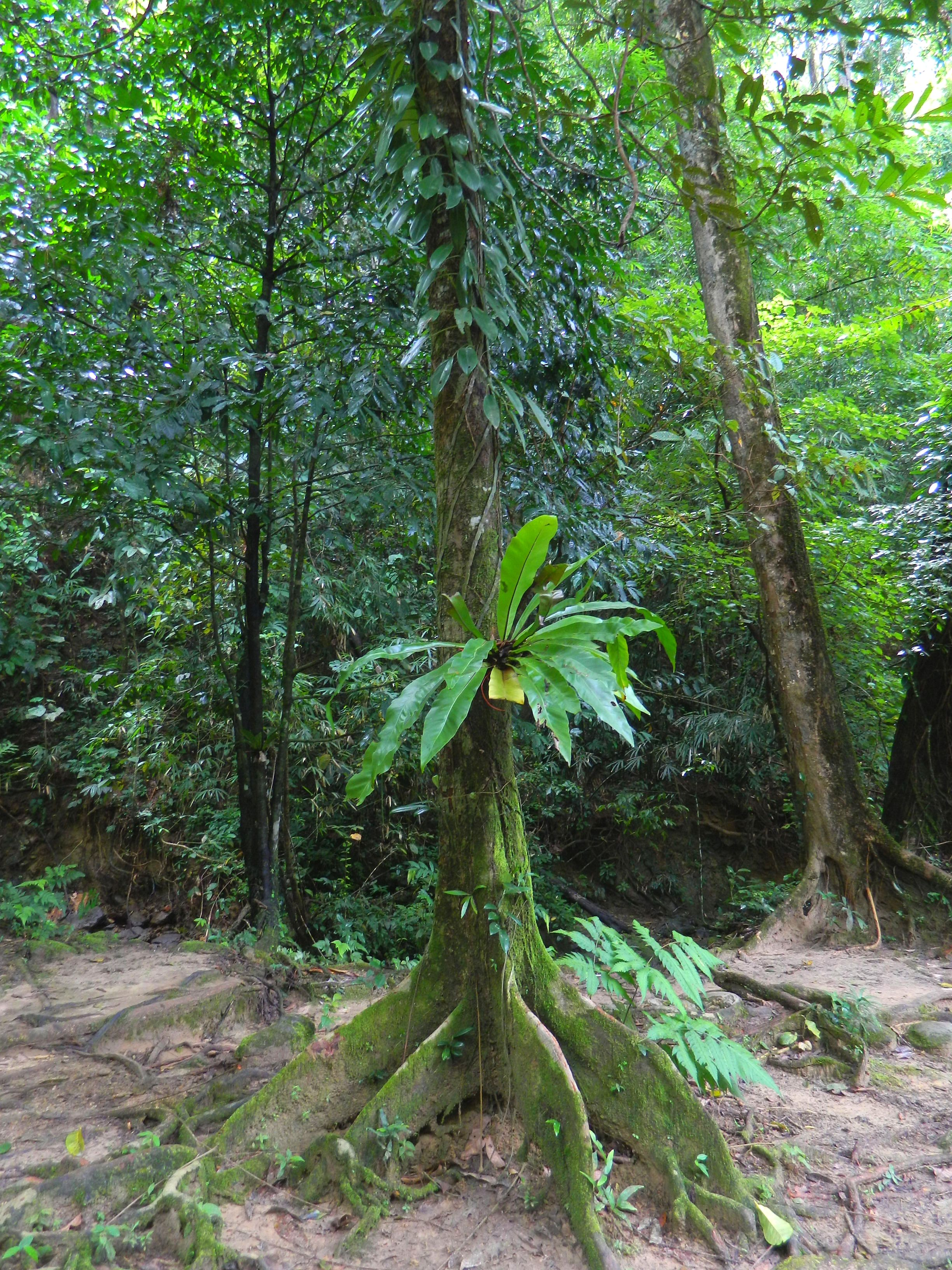
Sa Nang Manora Forest Park

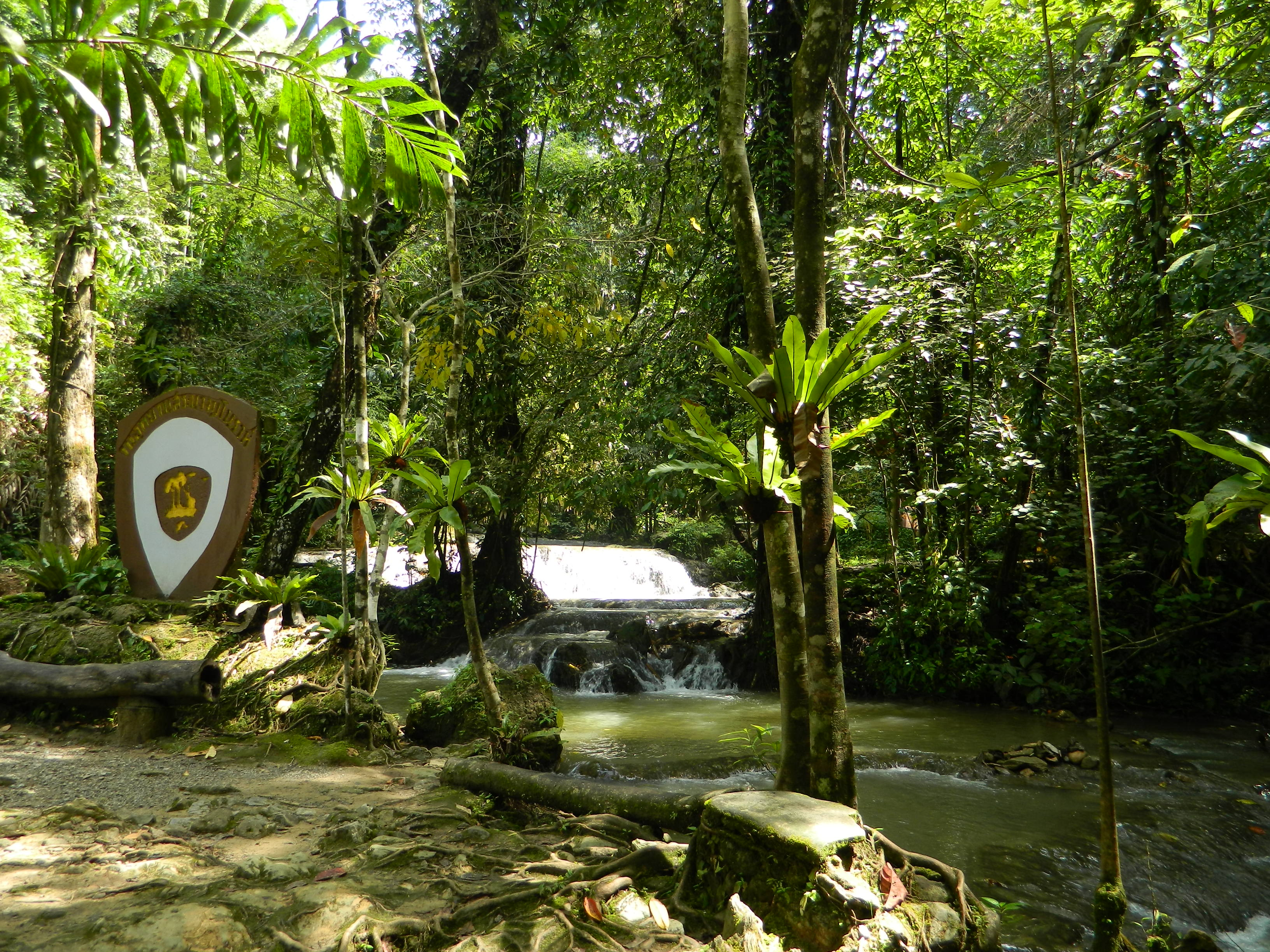
Sa Nang Manora Forest Park
