= Khao Kradong Forest Park =

Forest park in Thailand

Coordinates: 14°56′13″N 103°05′39″E

- IUCN category V (protected landscape/seascape)
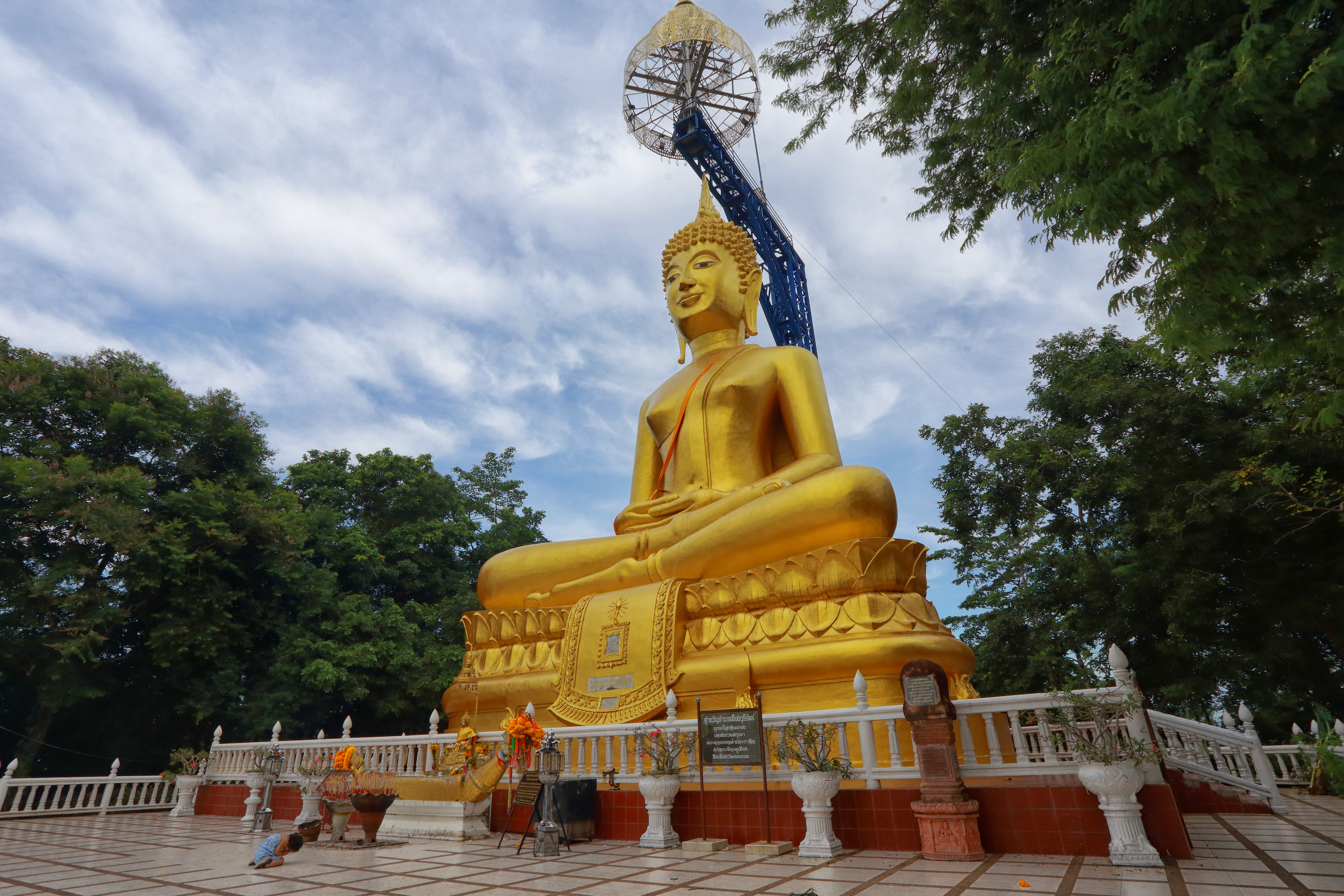
- Suphatthara Bophit Buddha image
- Interactive map of Khao Kradong Forest Park
- Location: Buriram Province
- Nearest city: Buriram
- Established: 1 Oct 1983
- Governing body: Department of National Parks, Wildlife and Plant Conservation

Khao Kradong Forest Park (Thai: วนอุทยานเขากระโดง) is a forest park in Buriram Province. The site of the park is a former volcano. Near the top of the volcano is the Suphatthara Bophit Buddha image. Located approximately 6 kilometres from the centre of Buriram City, it is one of six extinct volcanoes found in the province. The volcano rises about 230 metres above sea level and is surrounded by the Khao Kradong Forest Park.

== Geography ==
Khao Kradong is an extinct basaltic volcano that last erupted hundreds of thousands of years ago. The area consists of dry dipterocarp forest and supports a variety of plant and animal species. The volcanic crater remains clearly visible and can be accessed by visitors via a suspension bridge built across part of the crater.

== Attractions ==
Khao Kradong is known for its scenic viewpoints overlooking Buriram City and several religious and historical landmarks, including:

- Phra Suphattharabophit, a large seated Buddha statue overlooking the city.
- Khao Kradong Castle (Prasat Khao Kradong), a Khmer sanctuary dating to the Khmer period.
- A replica of the Buddha's footprint housed within the sanctuary complex.
- The volcanic crater and surrounding nature trails.

The site serves as both a religious destination and a popular recreational area for tourists and local residents.

== Conservation ==
The surrounding forest was designated as Khao Kradong Forest Park in 1978 and later became part of the Khao Kradong Volcano Non-Hunting Area. The protected area preserves the volcano's natural environment and biodiversity while supporting ecotourism and environmental education.

== See also ==
- List of volcanoes in Thailand
- Buriram Province
