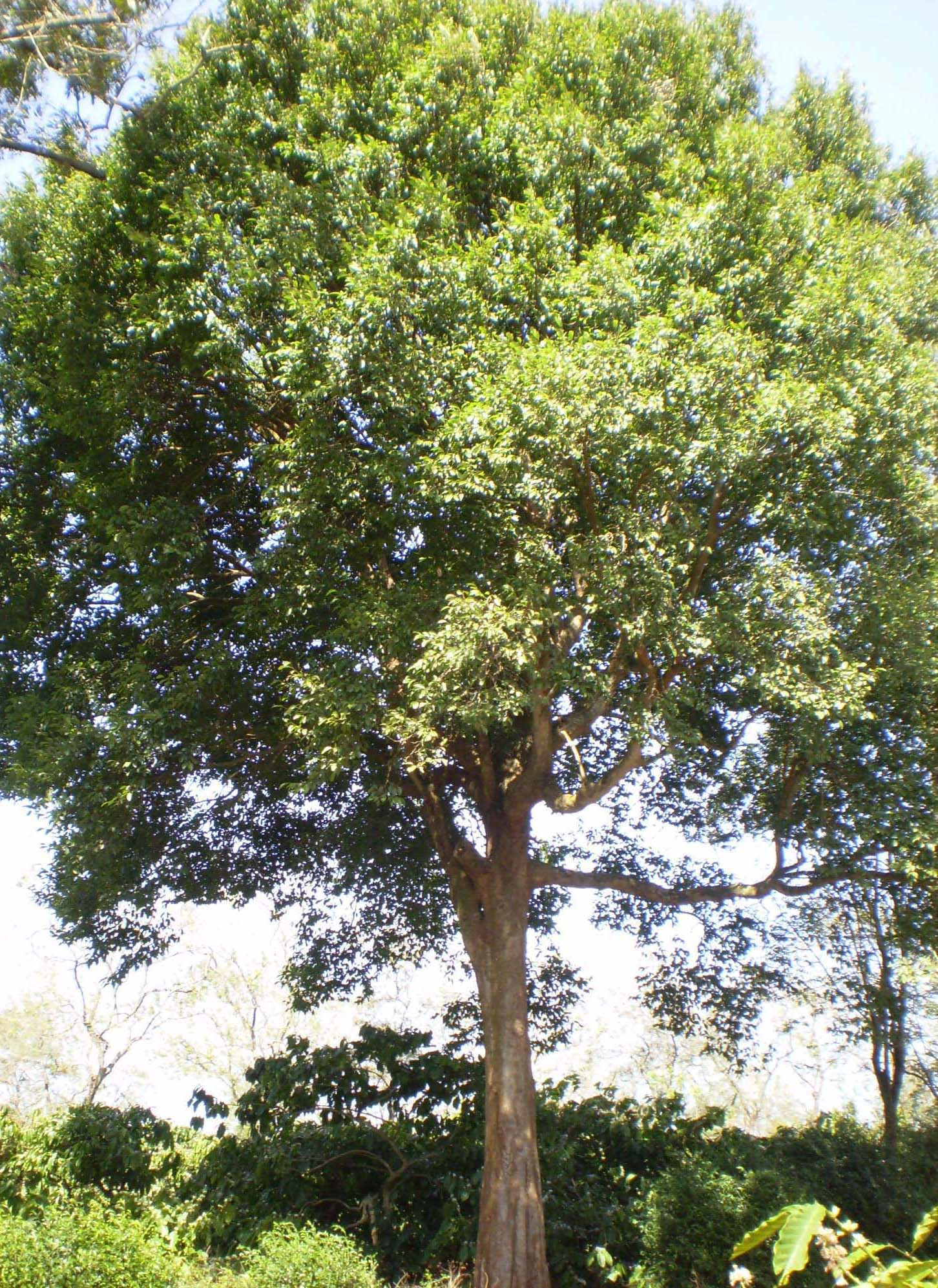

Conservation status
- Least Concern (IUCN 3.1)

Scientific classification
- Kingdom: Plantae
- Clade: Tracheophytes
- Clade: Angiosperms
- Clade: Eudicots
- Clade: Rosids
- Order: Malpighiales
- Family: Irvingiaceae
- Genus: Irvingia
- Species: I. malayana

Binomial name
- Irvingia malayana Oliv. ex A.W.Benn.

Synonyms
- Irvingella harmandiana Tiegh.; Irvingella malayana (Oliv. ex A.W.Benn.) Tiegh.; Irvingella oliveri (Pierre) Tiegh.; Irvingia oliveri Pierre

= Irvingia malayana =

Species of plant in the family Irvingiaceae

Irvingia malayana, also known as wild almond (Vietnamese: Kơ nia, Thai: กระบก, Khmer: ចំបក់) or barking deer's mango, is a tropical evergreen tree species in the family Irvingiaceae. The specific epithet malayana is from the Latin meaning "of Malaya".

== Description ==
Irvingia malayana grows as a large tree up to 50 metres (160 ft) tall with a trunk diameter of up to 500 millimetres (20 in). The bark is greyish to whitish. The flowers are greenish white or yellowish. The ellipsoid fruits measure up to 60 mm (2 in) long.

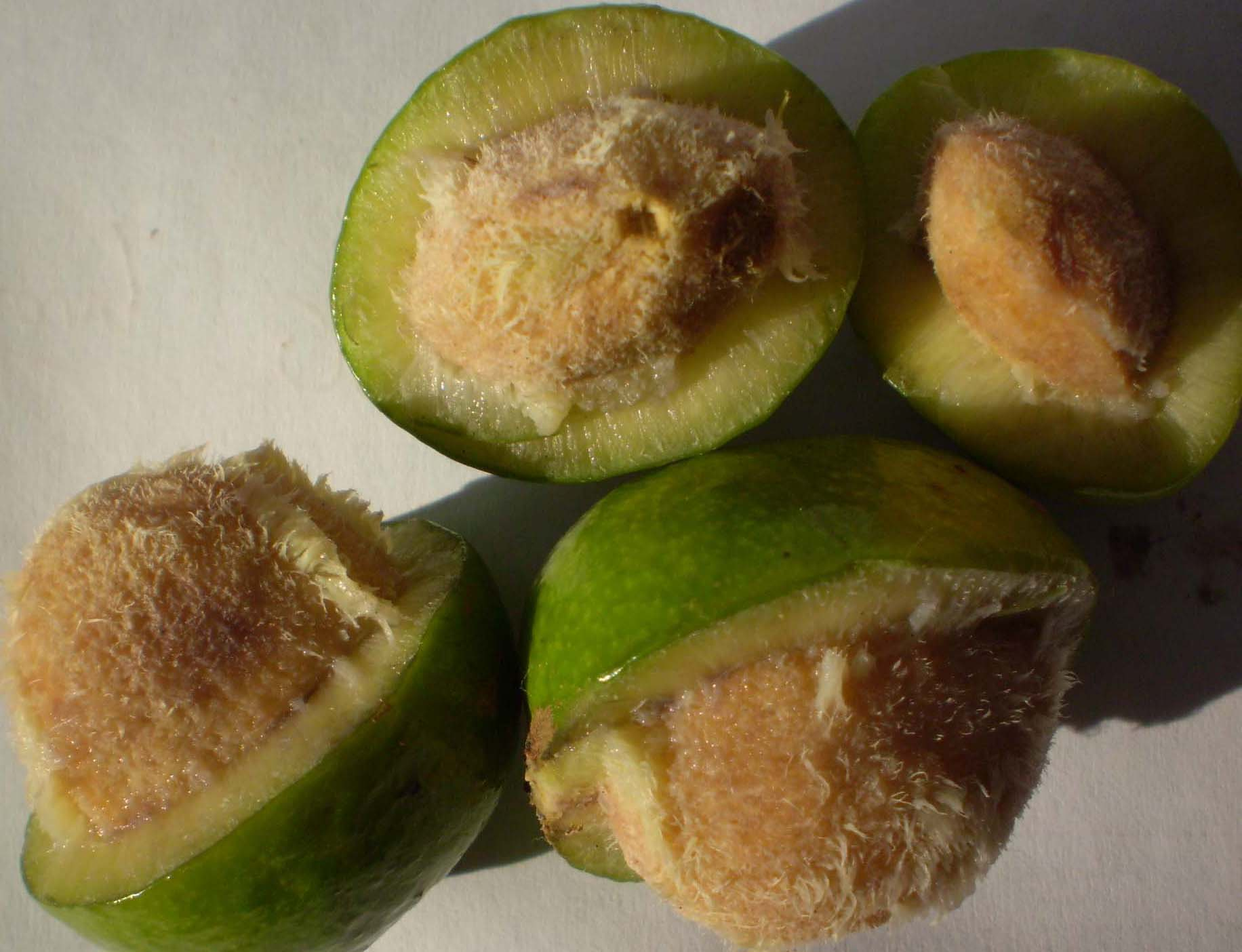
Fruit

== Distribution and habitat ==
Irvingia malayana grows naturally in Indo-China and Malesia. Its main habitat is mixed tropical forests, often associated with dipterocarps, from sea-level to 300 m (1,000 ft) altitude.

== Uses ==
The wood of this tree is used in construction. In Thailand's Roi Et Province it is one of the preferred woods for charcoal, where its seeds are also valued as food and eaten roasted.
