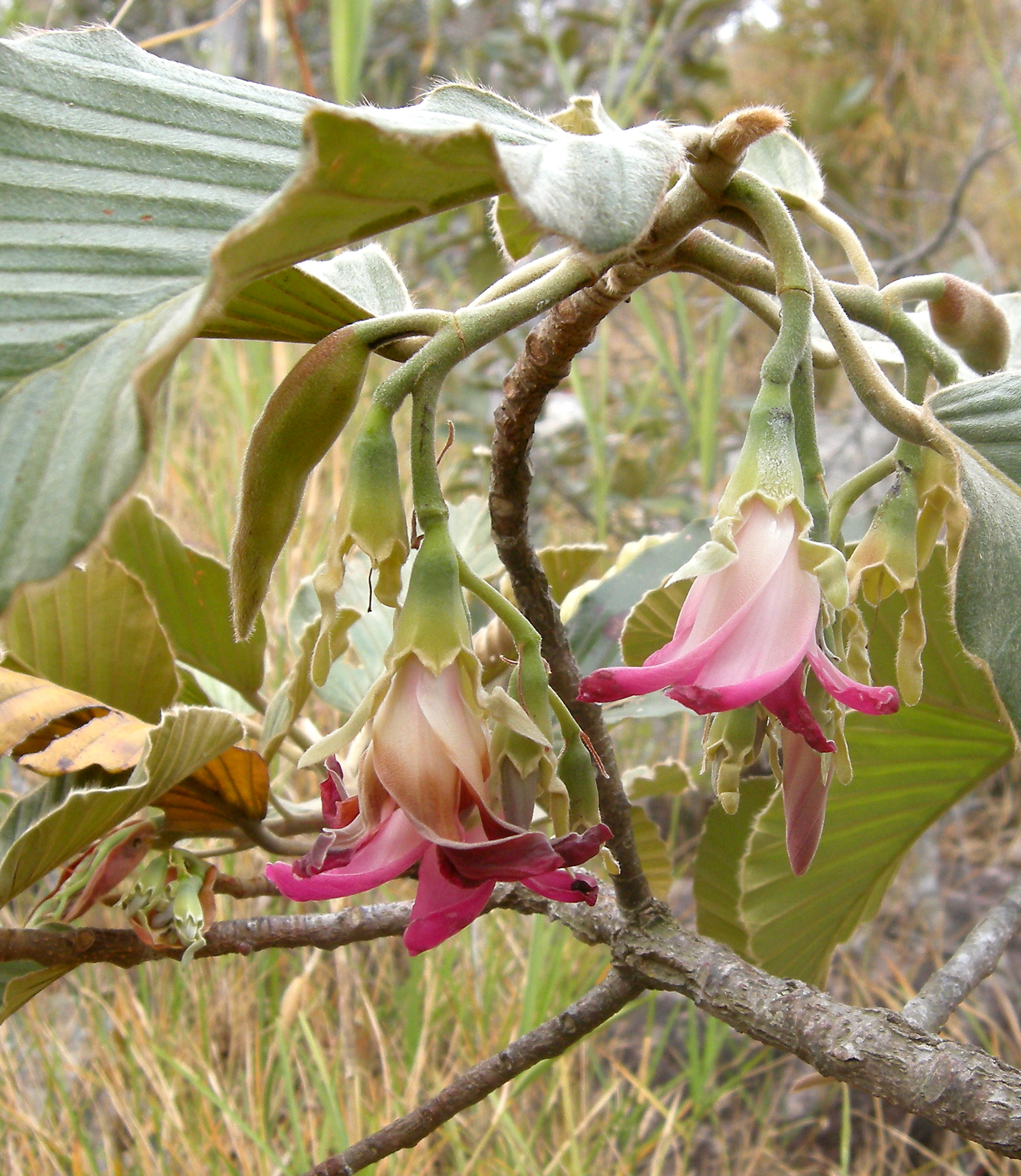
- Foliage and flowers

Conservation status
- Near Threatened (IUCN 3.1)

Scientific classification
- Kingdom: Plantae
- Clade: Tracheophytes
- Clade: Angiosperms
- Clade: Eudicots
- Clade: Rosids
- Order: Malvales
- Family: Dipterocarpaceae
- Genus: Dipterocarpus
- Species: D. obtusifolius

Binomial name
- Dipterocarpus obtusifolius Teijsm. ex Miq.

Synonyms
- Dipterocarpus obtusifolius var. cuspidatus C.E.C.Fisch.; Dipterocarpus obtusifolius var. glabricalyx Smitinand; Dipterocarpus obtusifolius var. subnudus Ryan & Kerr; Dipterocarpus obtusifolius var. vestitus (Wall. ex Dyer) Smitinand; Dipterocarpus punctulatus Pierre; Dipterocarpus vestitus Wall. ex Dyer

= Dipterocarpus obtusifolius =

Species of tree

Dipterocarpus obtusifolius is a species of tree in the family Dipterocarpaceae found throughout Southeast Asia, including Andaman Islands, Myanmar, Thailand, Cambodia, Laos and Vietnam.

Four varieties have been described – D. o. var. cuspidatus, D. o. var. subnudus, D. o. var. glabricalyx, and D. o. var. vestitus – but all are now considered to be synonyms. The variety D. o. var. subnudus differed by having completely hairless leaves and is found only in the south of Cambodia, Vietnam and Thailand.

Trees are large, up to 30m tall, grow in dry dipterocarp forest, and the red brown wood is used in general construction. In Cambodia, the resin from the tree is used to make torches, drinking water was obtained by cutting young stalks and the wood gave boards regarded as non-durable in construction, while in some areas of the Kompong Chhnang Province it is an important firewood source.

== Gallery ==
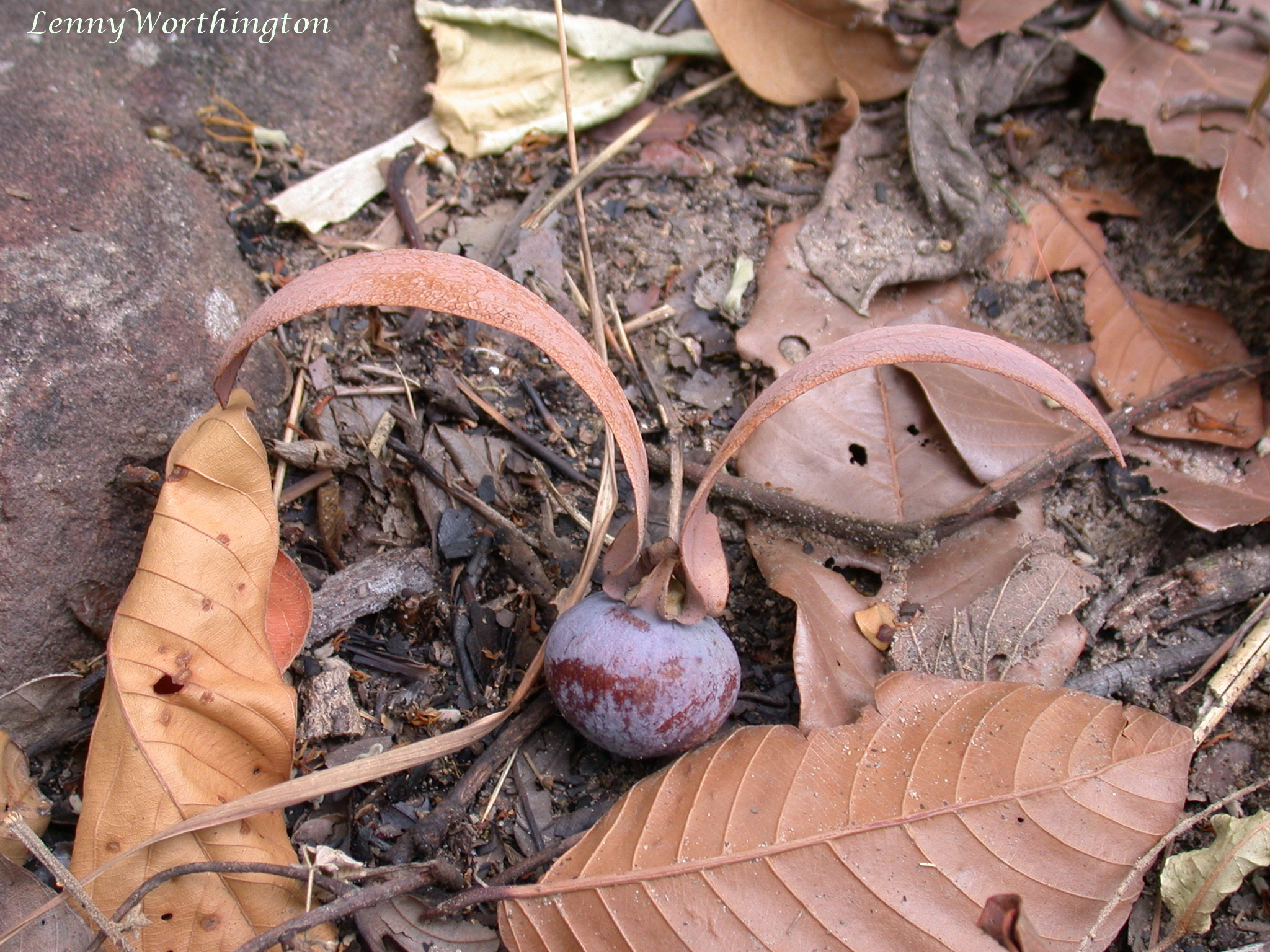
Fruit

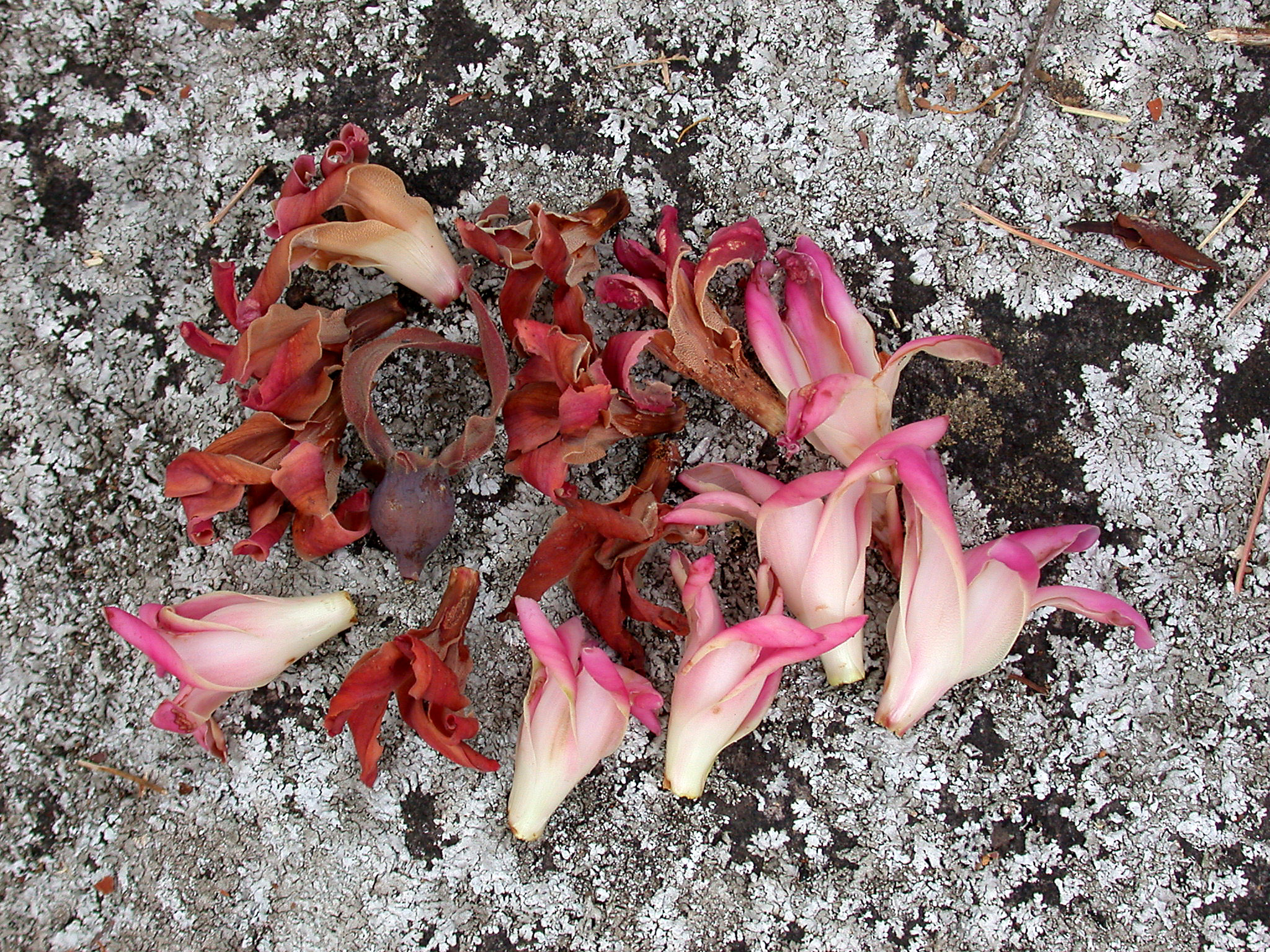
Flowers

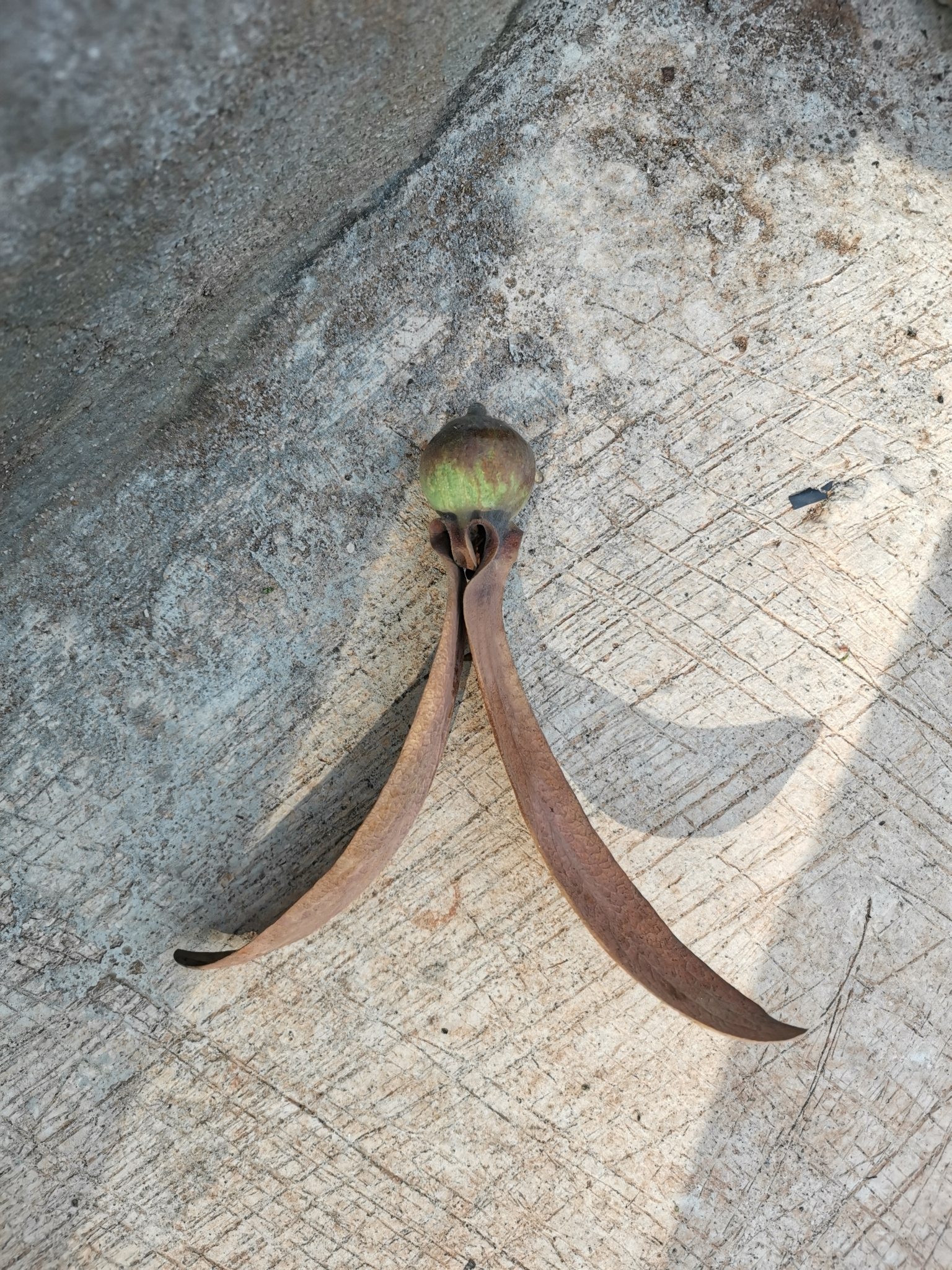
Fruit
