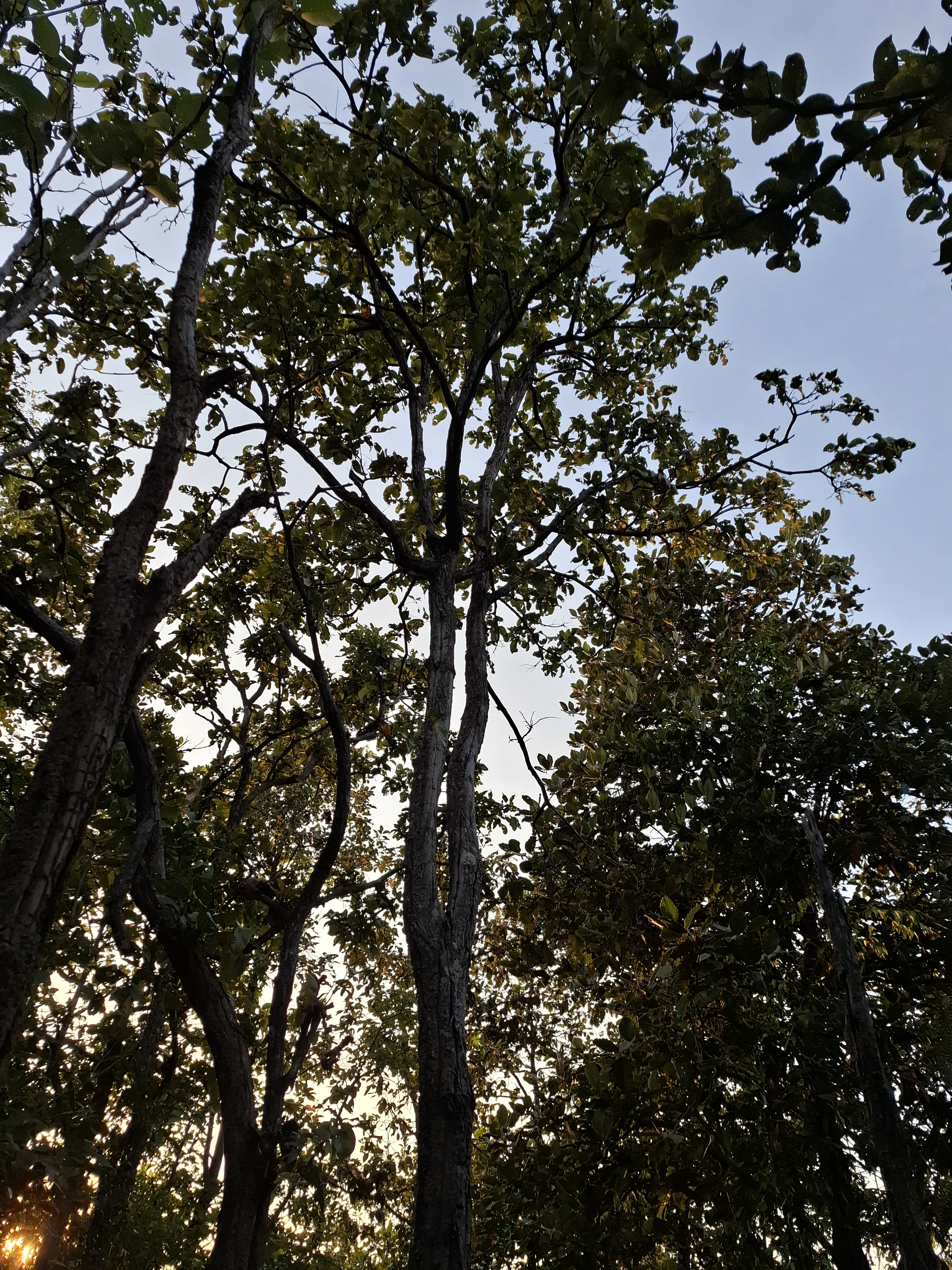
- In Chiang Mai, Thailand

Conservation status
- Near Threatened (IUCN 3.1)

Scientific classification
- Kingdom: Plantae
- Clade: Tracheophytes
- Clade: Angiosperms
- Clade: Eudicots
- Clade: Rosids
- Order: Malvales
- Family: Dipterocarpaceae
- Genus: Shorea
- Species: S. obtusa

Binomial name
- Shorea obtusa Wall. ex Blume

Synonyms
- Shorea leucobotrya Miq.; Vatica obtusa Steud.

= Shorea obtusa =

Siamese sal

Species of tree

Shorea obtusa, the Siamese sal, is a species of hardwood tree in the family Dipterocarpaceae, native to Southeast Asia.

== Distribution and habitat ==
Shorea obtusa is native to Myanmar, Thailand, Cambodia, Laos, and Vietnam. It grows in relatively dry areas, often sharing the same habitat with Dipterocarpus obtusifolius, as well as oaks Quercus kerrii, Quercus kingiana, and pines, up to 1,300 metres (4,300 ft) elevation in Thailand. Another description of the habitat is that it grows in the clear forests at 150–1,300 m (500–4,300 ft).

== Description ==
Shorea obtusa is a deciduous tropical tree, growing 10–30 m (30–100 ft) tall. It flowers from January to July; the distinctive yellow flowers droop in clusters, with long narrow petals. It grows stunted in savannas.

== Uses ==
As well as an export timber source, the wood is graded as first (highest) category in Cambodia. It is a very hard timber and is used to make columns, bridges, sleepers, and for other various construction purposes. Exposed in the open, it may last 10–15 years, though if indoors it may last 50–60 years. The resin, from the trunk, is used to make torches, while the bark is part of a malaria remedy. The tree is the most preferred source of firewood in some areas of Kompong Chhnang Province, Cambodia.

== Conservation ==
Shorea obtusa has been assessed as Near Threatened on the IUCN Red List. The species is threatened by logging for timber and land conversion for agriculture. The prior assessment in 1998 had assessed the species as Least concern.
