= Phu Pha Lek National Park =

National park in Thailand

- IUCN category II (national park)
- Park location in Thailand
- Location: Thailand
- Nearest city: Udon Thani
- Coordinates: 17.27°N 103.47°E
- Area: 406 km^{2} (157 sq mi)
- Established: 2009
- Governing body: Department of National Parks, Wildlife and Plant Conservation

Phu Pha Lek National Park is a national park in Sakon Nakhon, Udon Thani and Kalasin provinces in Thailand. The park is home to rock formations, waterfalls and forests.

== Geography ==
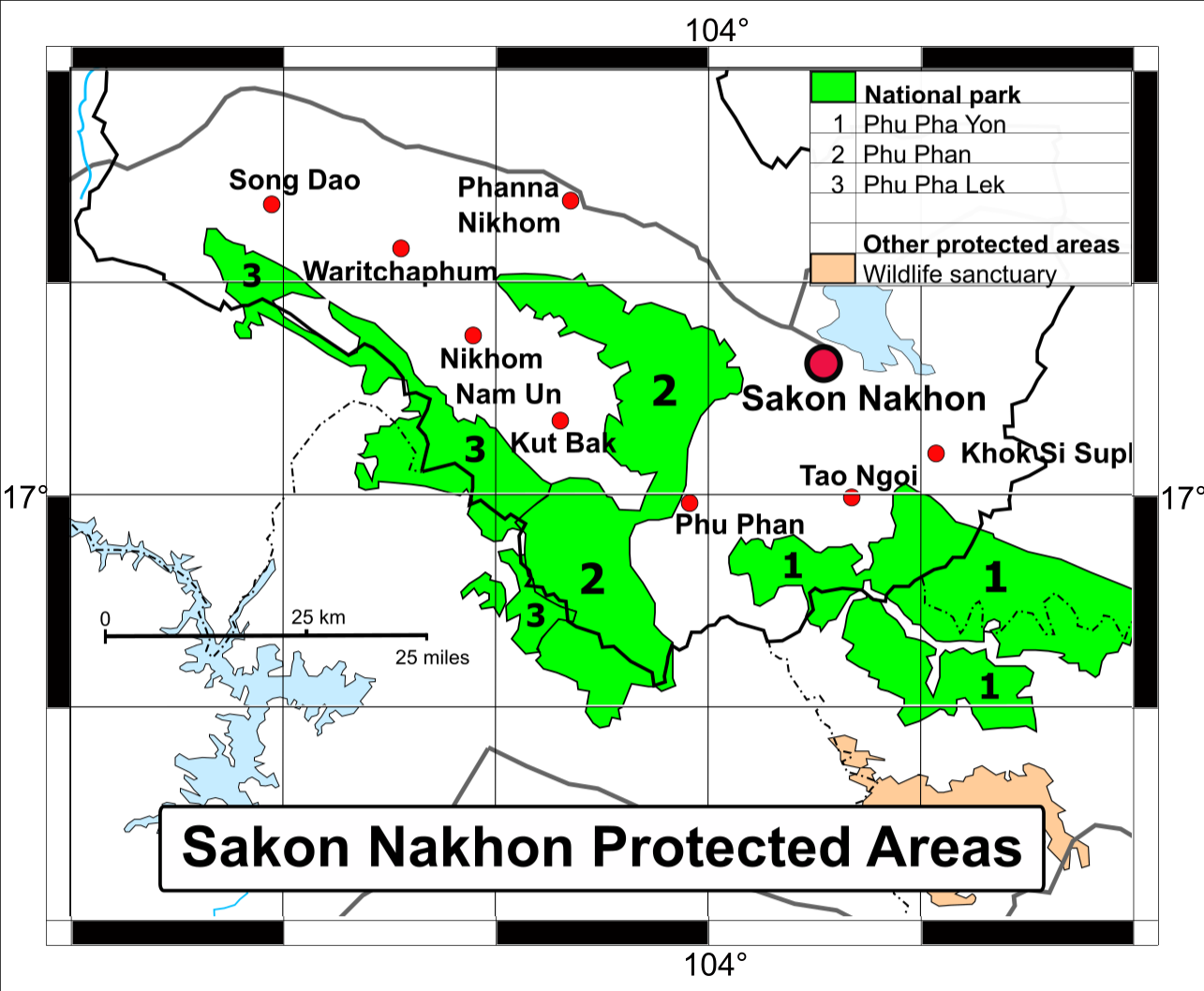
Protected areas of Sakon Nakhon province

Phu Pha Lek National Park is mainly in Sakon Nakhon province, with smaller parts in Udon Thani and Kalasin provinces. The park is about 80 km (50 mi) from Udon Thani. The park's area is 406 km^{2} (157 sq mi).

The park is in the Phu Phan Range and the highest point is Phu Ang So peak at 695 m (2,280 ft) high.

== Attractions ==
Pha Suriyan cliff is a park viewpoint. The Lan Usa Sawan plateau features rock formations. Pha Paek Waen is a site of prehistoric rock paintings. Park waterfalls include Kao Chan, Di Mi and Kaeng Kula.

== Flora and fauna ==
The park features dipterocarp, deciduous and evergreen forests. Plant species include Dipterocarpus tuberculatus, Shorea obtusa and Shorea siamensis.

The park hosts animals including wild boar, muntjac and sambar deer. Birds in the park include greater coucal, sooty-headed bulbul, scaly-breasted munia, plain prinia and lineated barbet.
