= Phu Langka National Park =

National park in Thailand

- IUCN category II (national park)

- Park location in Thailand
- Location: Thailand
- Nearest city: Nakhon Phanom
- Coordinates: 17.99°N 104.14°E
- Area: 50 km^{2} (19 sq mi)
- Established: 2009
- Governing body: Department of National Parks, Wildlife and Plant Conservation

Phu Langka National Park is a national park in Nakhon Phanom and Bueng Kan provinces in Thailand. The park is home to waterfalls, cliffs and caves.

== Geography ==
Phu Langka National Park is in Ban Phaeng and Na Thom districts of Nakhon Phanom province and Bueng Khong Long district of Bueng Kan province. The park is about 100 km (60 mi) from Nakhon Phanom. The park's area is 50 km^{2} (19 sq mi).

The park's highest point is Phu Langka Nuea peak at 563 m (1,847 ft). A number of streams originate in the park, flowing to the Mekong River.

== Attractions ==
Tat Pho waterfall has four tiers including one 30 m (100 ft) high. The nearby Nakee cave is accessible via a trail. Phrathat Phu Langka is a temple holding Buddha relics from Nepal.

== Flora ==
The park is home to plant species such as Paphiopedilum orchids. Other species include Musa acuminata, Phalaenopsis pulcherrima and species of Calamus.
