= List of provincial trees of Thailand =

List of official trees of the provinces of Thailand:

== List ==
| Province | Scientific name | Thai common name | Image |
|---|---|---|---|
| Chiang Rai | Mayodendron igneum | กาซะลองคำ kasa longkham | |
| Chiang Mai | Butea monosperma | ทองกวาว thong gwao (กวาว gwao, ก๋าว gao) | |
| Nan | Betula alnoides | กำลังเสือโคร่ง kamlang seua khrong | |
| Phayao | Mammea siamensis | สารภี saraphi | |
| Phrae | Chukrasia tabularis | ยมหิน yom hin (ยมขาว yom khao) | |
| Mae Hong Son | Millettia brandisiana | จั่น jan (กระพี้จั่น krapi jan) | |
| Lampang | Holoptelea integrifolia | กระเชา krachao (ขเจา, ขจาว khajao) | |
| Lamphun | Samanea saman | ก้ามปู gampu (สำสา samsa, จามจุรี jamjuri, จามจุรีแดง jamjuri daeng) | |
| Uttaradit | Tectona grandis | สัก sak | |
| Kalasin | Artocarpus lacucha | มะหาด mahat | |
| Khon Kaen | Cassia bakeriana | กัลปพฤกษ์ | |
| Chaiyaphum | Senna siamea | ขี้เหล็ก khi lek | |
| Nakhon Phanom | Fagraea fragrans | กันเกรา kankrao (มันปลา man pla) | |
| Nakhon Ratchasima | Millettia leucantha var. buteoides | สาธร sathon | |
| Bueng Kan | Phanera sirindhorniae | | |
| Buriram | Cassia grandis | กาฬพฤกษ์ | |
| Maha Sarakham | Albizia lebbeck | พฤกษ์ preuk (จามจุรี, มะรุมป่า) | |
| Mukdahan | Ochna integerrima | ตานเหลือง taan lueang (ช้างน้าว) | |
| Yasothon | Anisoptera costata | กระบาก krabak | |
| Roi Et | Irvingia malayana | กระบก krabok (หมากบก maak bok) | |
| Loei | Pinus kesiya | สนสามใบ son sam bai (สนเขา son khao) | |
| Sisaket | Sphaerocoryne lefevrei | ลำดวน lamduan (รันดูล randun) | |
| Sakon Nakhon | Lagerstroemia speciosa | อินทนิล inthanin (อินทนิลน้ำ) | |
| Surin | Sindora siamensis | มะค่าแต้ makha tae (แต้ tae) | |
| Nong Khai | Dalbergia oliveri | ชิงชัน ching chan | |
| Nong Bua Lamphu | Dalbergia cochinchinensis | พะยูง phayung | |
| Amnat Charoen | Hopea ferrea | ตะเคียนหิน takhian hin | |
| Udon Thani | Shorea siamensis | รัง rang | |
| Ubon Ratchathani | Dipterocarpus alatus | ยางนา yang na | |
| Bangkok | Ficus benjamina | ไทรย้อยใบแหลม sai yoi bai laem | |
| Kamphaeng Phet | Senegalia catechu | สีเสียดแก่น si siat kaen (สีเสียด, สีเสียดเหนือ) | |
| Chainat | Aegle marmelos | มะตูม madum | |
| Nakhon Nayok | Cochlospermum regium | สุพรรณิการ์ suphannika | |
| Nakhon Pathom | Mansonia gagei | จันทน์ชะมด jan chamot (จันทน์หอม jan hom) | |
| Nakhon Sawan | Lagerstroemia loudonii | เสลา sela (อินทรชิต) | |
| Nonthaburi | Peltophorum pterocarpum | นนทรี nonsi (นนทรีบ้าน) | |
| Pathum Thani | Erythrina variegata | ทองหลางลาย thong lang lai (ทองหลางด่าง, ปาริชาต) | |
| Ayutthaya | Cordia cochinchinensis | หมัน man | |
| Phichit | Mesua ferrea | บุนนาค bun nak | |
| Phitsanulok | Millingtonia hortensis | ปีบ bip | |
| Phetchabun | Tamarindus indica | มะขาม makham | |
| Lopburi | Mimusops elengi | พิกุล phigun | |
| Samut Prakan | Thespesia populnea | โพทะเล pho thale | |
| Samut Songkhram | Barringtonia asiatica | จิกเล jikle (จิกทะเล) | |
| Samut Sakhon | Alstonia scholaris | สัตบรรณ sataban (พญาสัตบรรณ phaya sataban, ตีนเป็ด tin pet) | |
| Saraburi | Lagerstroemia floribunda | ตะแบกนา tabaek naa | |
| Singburi | Adenanthera pavonina | มะกล่ำตาช้าง maglam taa chang (มะกล่ำต้น) | |
| Sukhothai | Afzelia xylocarpa | มะค่า makha (มะค่าโมง makha mong) | |
| Suphanburi | Diospyros mollis | มะเกลือ makleua | |
| Ang Thong | Diospyros malabarica var. siamensis | มะพลับ maplap (พลับ plap) | |
| Uthai Thani | Azadirachta indica var. siamensis | สะเดา sadao | |
| Chanthaburi | Diospyros decandra | จัน jan (จันอิน jan in, จันโอ jan oh, จันลูกหอม jan luk hom) | |
| Chachoengsao | Peltophorum dasyrrhachis | อะราง arang (นนทรีป่า nonsi paa) | |
| Chonburi | Pterocarpus macrocarpus | ประดู่ pratu (ประดู่ป่า pratu paa) | |
| Trat | Terminalia catappa | หูกวาง huu kwang | |
| Prachinburi | Ficus religiosa | โพ pho (โพศรีมหาโพธิ) | |
| Rayong | Calophyllum inophyllum | กระทิง krathing (สารภีทะเล saraphi thale, กากะทิง ka kathing) | |
| Sa Kaeo | Phyllanthus emblica | มะขามป้อม makham bom | |
| Kanchanaburi | Homalium tomentosum | ขานาง khanang | |
| Tak | Xylia xylocarpa var. kerrii | แดง daeng | |
| Prachuap Khiri Khan | Manilkara hexandra | เกด ket | |
| Phetchaburi | Syzygium cumini | หว้า waa | |
| Ratchaburi | Wrightia arborea | โมกมัน mok man | |
| Krabi | Alstonia macrophylla | ทุ้งฟ้า thung faa | |
| Chumphon | Ficus racemosa | มะเดื่ออุทุมพร madeua uthumphon (มะเดื่อชุมพร) | |
| Trang | Jacaranda obtusifolia | ศรีตรัง sri trang | |
| Nakhon Si Thammarat | Callerya atropurpurea | แซะ sae | |
| Narathiwat | Neobalanocarpus heimii | ตะเคียนชันตาแมว takhian chan taa maew (จืองา มัส, จืองา บาตู) | |
| Pattani | Hopea odorata | ตะเคียน takhian (ตะเคียนทอง takhian thong, จืองา jeu nga) | |
| Phang Nga | Cinnamomum porrectum | เทพทาโร theptharo (จวง, จวงหอม) | |
| Phatthalung | Shorea roxburghii | พะยอม phayom | |
| Phuket | Pterocarpus indicus | ประดู่บ้าน pratu ban (ประดู่ pratu) | |
| Yala | Saraca thaipingensis | อโศกเหลือง asok lueang (โสกเหลือง sok lueang, ศรียะลา sri yala) | |
| Ranong | Cinnamomum bejolghota | อบเชย op choei (เชียด chiat, บริแวง bri waeng, ฝนแสนห่า fon saen haa) | |
| Songkhla | Azadirachta excelsa | สะเดาเทียม sadao thiam (เทียม thiam, สะเดาช้าง) | |
| Satun | Dalbergia parviflora | กระซิก krasik (หมากพลูตั๊กแตน mak plu takataen) | |
| Surat Thani | Cotylelobium lanceolatum | เคี่ยม khian | |

== See also ==
- Seals of the provinces of Thailand
- List of trees of northern Thailand
- List of U.S. state and territory trees

== Bibliography ==
- ราชบัณฑิตยสถาน. พจนานุกรม ฉบับราชบัณฑิตยสถาน พ.ศ. ๒๕๕๔ เฉลิมพระเกียรติพระบาทสมเด็จพระเจ้าอยู่หัว เนื่องในโอกาสพระราชพิธีมหามงคลเฉลิมพระชนมพรรษา ๗ รอบ ๕ ธันวาคม ๒๕๕๔. กรุงเทพฯ : ราชบัณฑิตยสถาน, 2556. (in Thai)
- ราชบัณฑิตยสถาน. หนังสืออนุกรมวิธานพืช อักษร ก. พิมพ์ครั้งที่ 2. กรุงเทพฯ : ราชบัณฑิตยสถาน, 2547. (in Thai)
- ราชบัณฑิตยสถาน. หนังสืออนุกรมวิธานพืช อักษร ข. กรุงเทพฯ : ราชบัณฑิตยสถาน, 2547. (in Thai)
- ราชันย์ ภู่มา และสมราน สุดดี, บรรณาธิการ. ชื่อพรรณไม้แห่งประเทศไทย เต็ม สมิตินันทน์ ฉบับแก้ไขเพิ่มเติม พ.ศ. 2557. กรุงเทพฯ : สำนักงานหอพรรณไม้ สำนักวิจัยการอนุรักษ์ป่าไม้และพันธุ์พืช กรมอุทยานแห่งชาติ สัตว์ป่า และพันธุ์พืช กระทรวงทรัพยากรธรรมชาติและสิ่งแวดล้อม, 2557. (in Thai)
- ส่วนเพาะชำกล้าไม้. สำนักส่งเสริมการปลูกป่า. กรมป่าไม้. พันธุ์ไม้มงคลพระราชทาน. กรุงเทพฯ : มูลนิธิสถาบันราชพฤกษ์, 2540. (in Thai)
