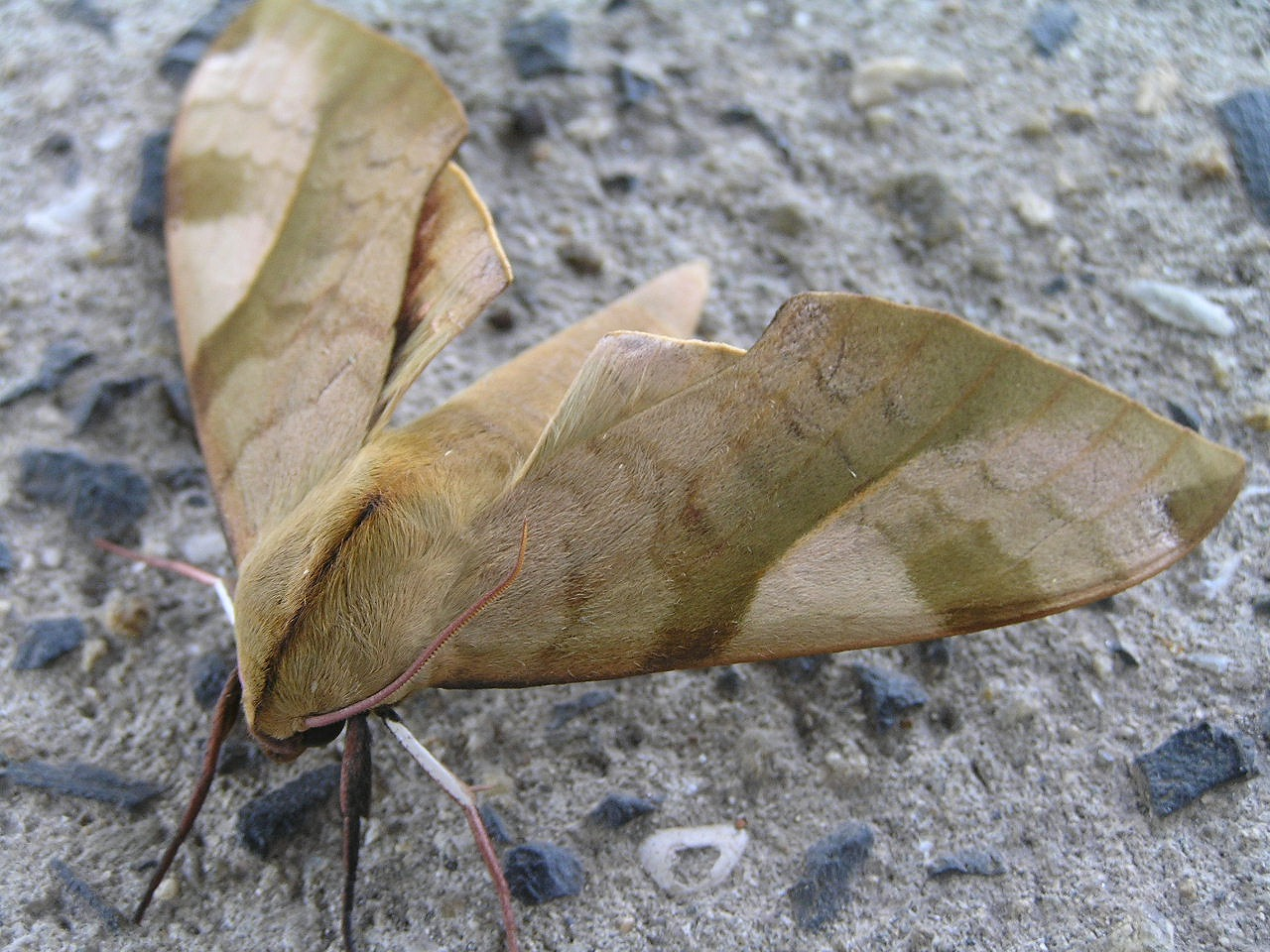
- Clanis bilineata tsingtauica

Scientific classification
- Domain: Eukaryota
- Kingdom: Animalia
- Phylum: Arthropoda
- Class: Insecta
- Order: Lepidoptera
- Family: Sphingidae
- Genus: Clanis
- Species: C. bilineata

Binomial name
- Clanis bilineata (Walker, 1866)

Synonyms
- Basiana bilineata Walker, 1866; Clanis bilineata formosana Gehlen, 1941; Clanis bilineata sumatrana Clark, 1936; Clanis bilineata tsingtauica Mell, 1922

= Clanis bilineata =

Species of moth

Clanis bilineata, the two-lined velvet hawkmoth, is a species of moth in the family Sphingidae first described by Francis Walker in 1866.

== Distribution ==
It is found in Asia, but see the subspecies section for a detailed range.

== Description ==
The wingspan is 94–150 mm for subspecies C. b. bilineata and 94–120 mm for subspecies C. b. tsingtauica.

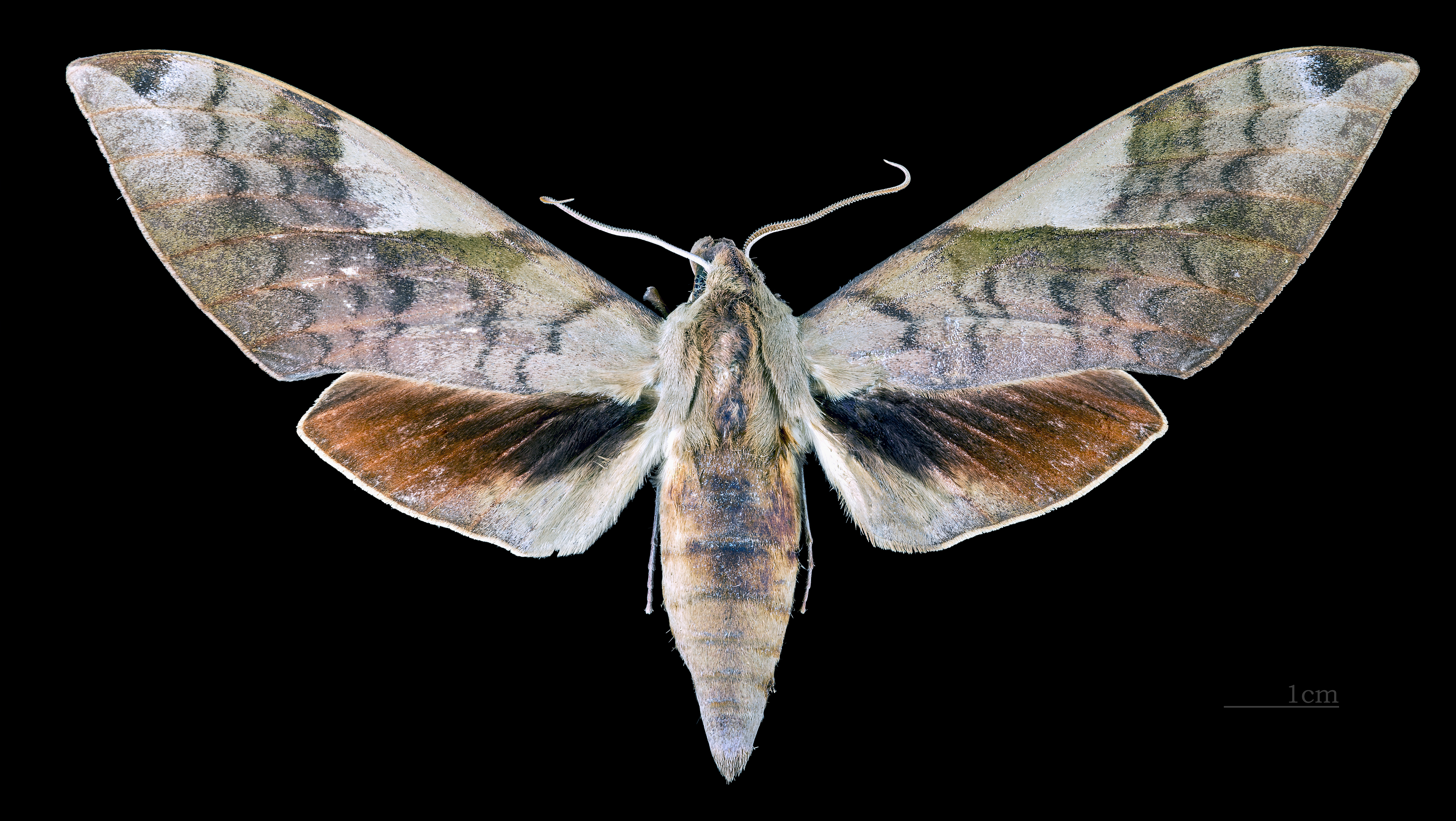
Male C. b. bilineata

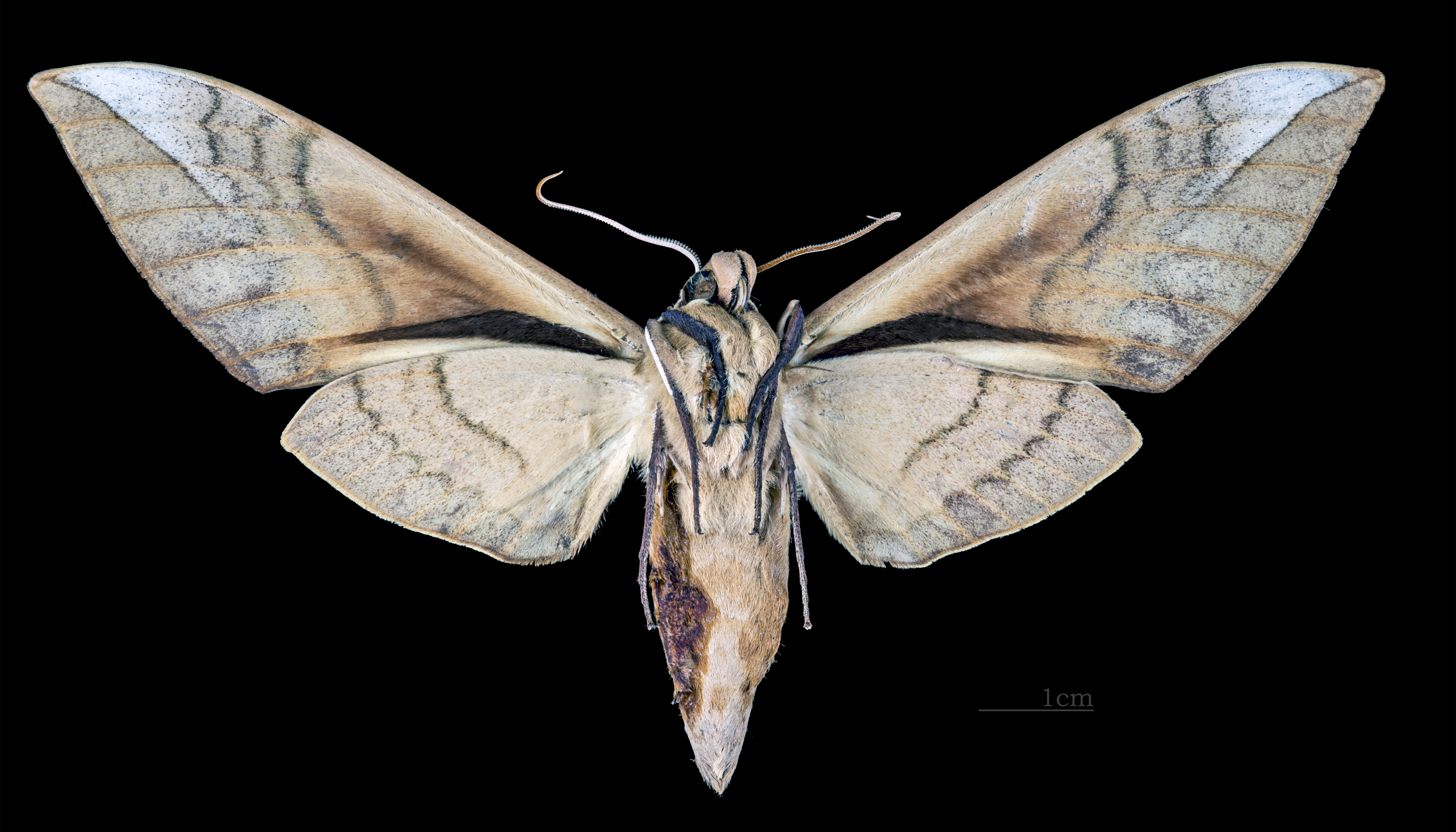
Male C. b. bilineata, underside

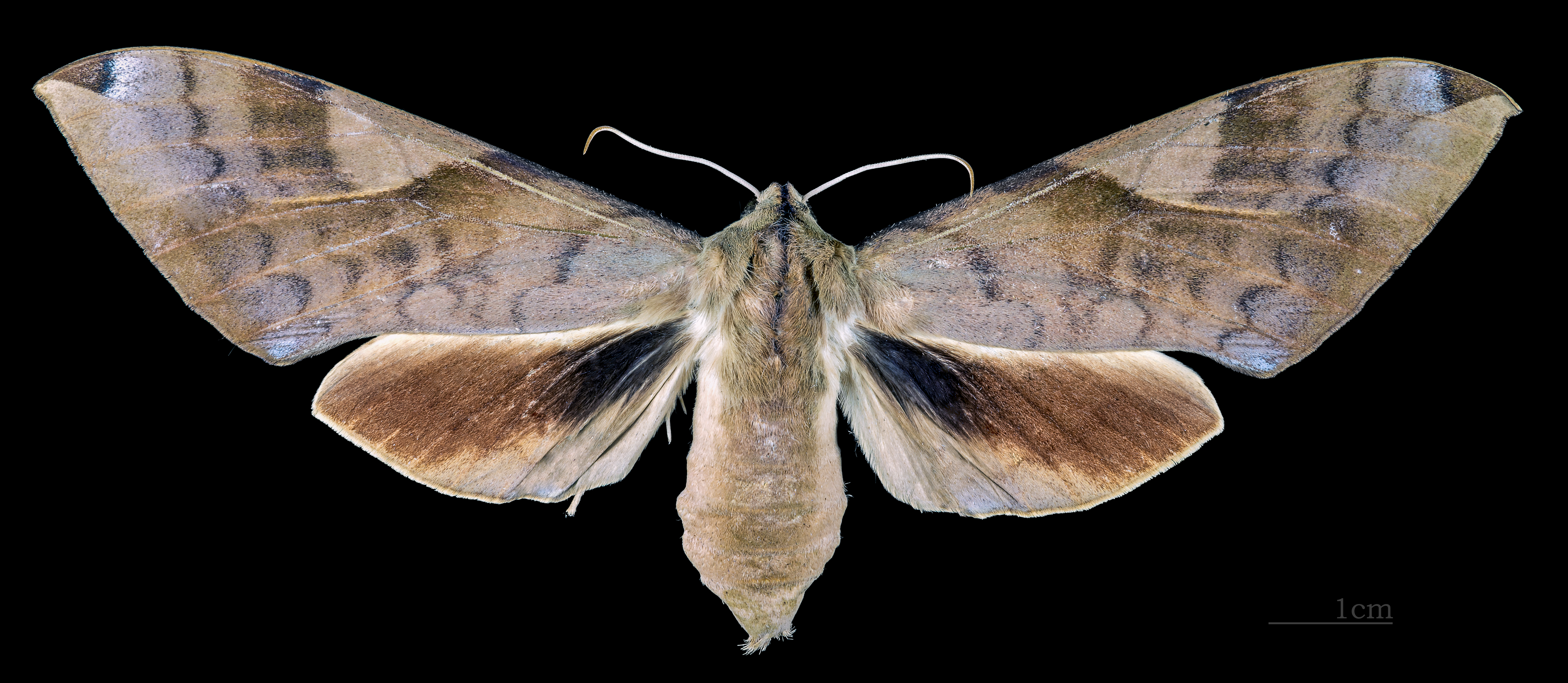
Female C. b. bilineata

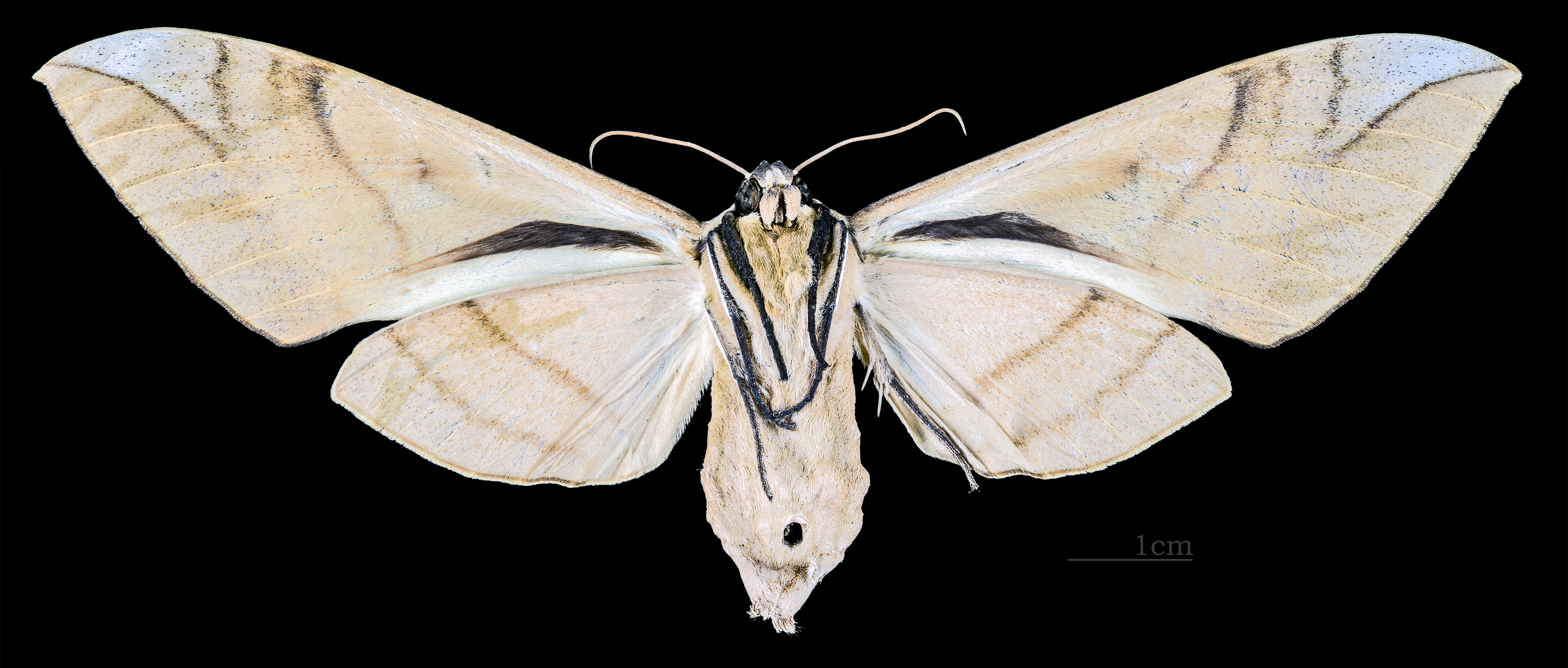
Female C. b. bilineata, underside

== Biology ==
Adults of the nominate subspecies are on wing from late February until October, with peaks in April, late July-early August, and mid-September in Hong Kong. There are multiple generations per year. Subspecies C. b. tsingtauica is on wing from May to late September in Korea.

Larvae of the nominate subspecies have been recorded on Pongamia pinnata, Millettia atropurpurea and Pterocarpus marsupium in India. In southern China it has been recorded from Mucuna and Pueraria.

== Subspecies ==
Some authors recognise three distinct subspecies, while others regard them as synonyms:

- Clanis bilineata bilineata (southern India, then from Nepal and northern India (Sikkim) across southern China to Taiwan)
- Clanis bilineata formosana (Taiwan)
- Clanis bilineata tsingtauica (the Russian Far East, Japan, Korea and north-eastern China, as far south as Shaanxi and Zhejiang)
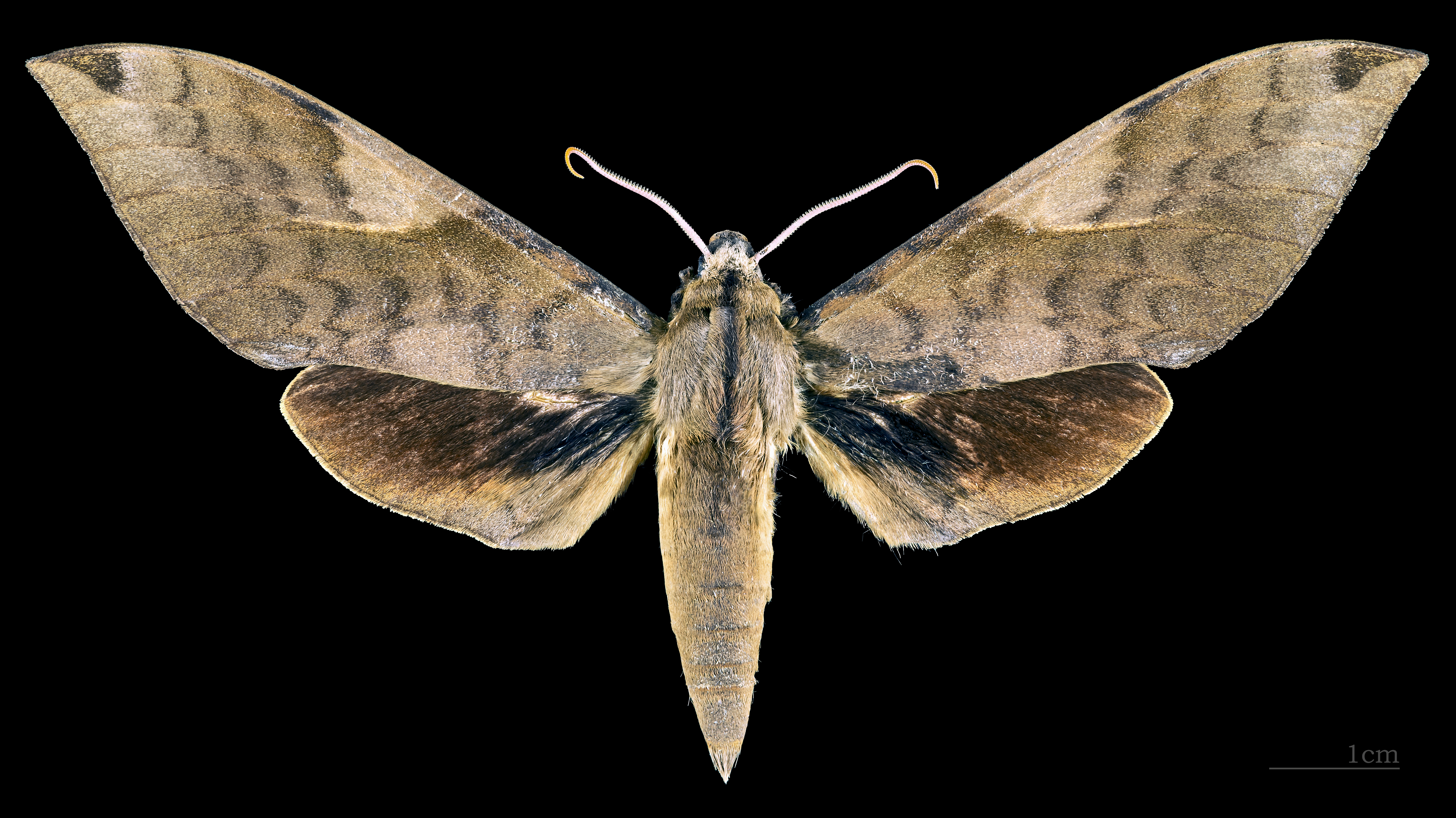
Male C. b. formosana

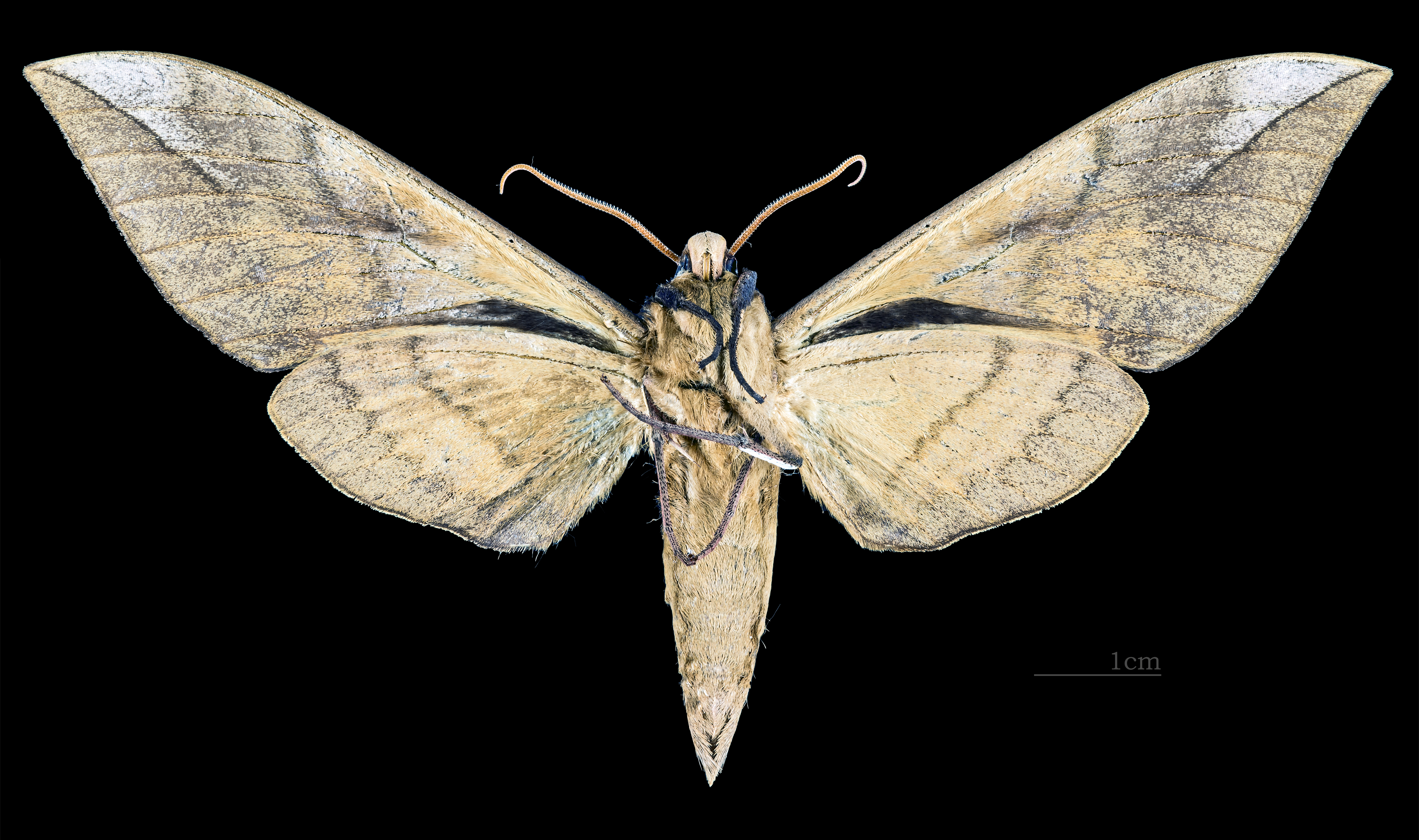
Male C. b. formosana, underside

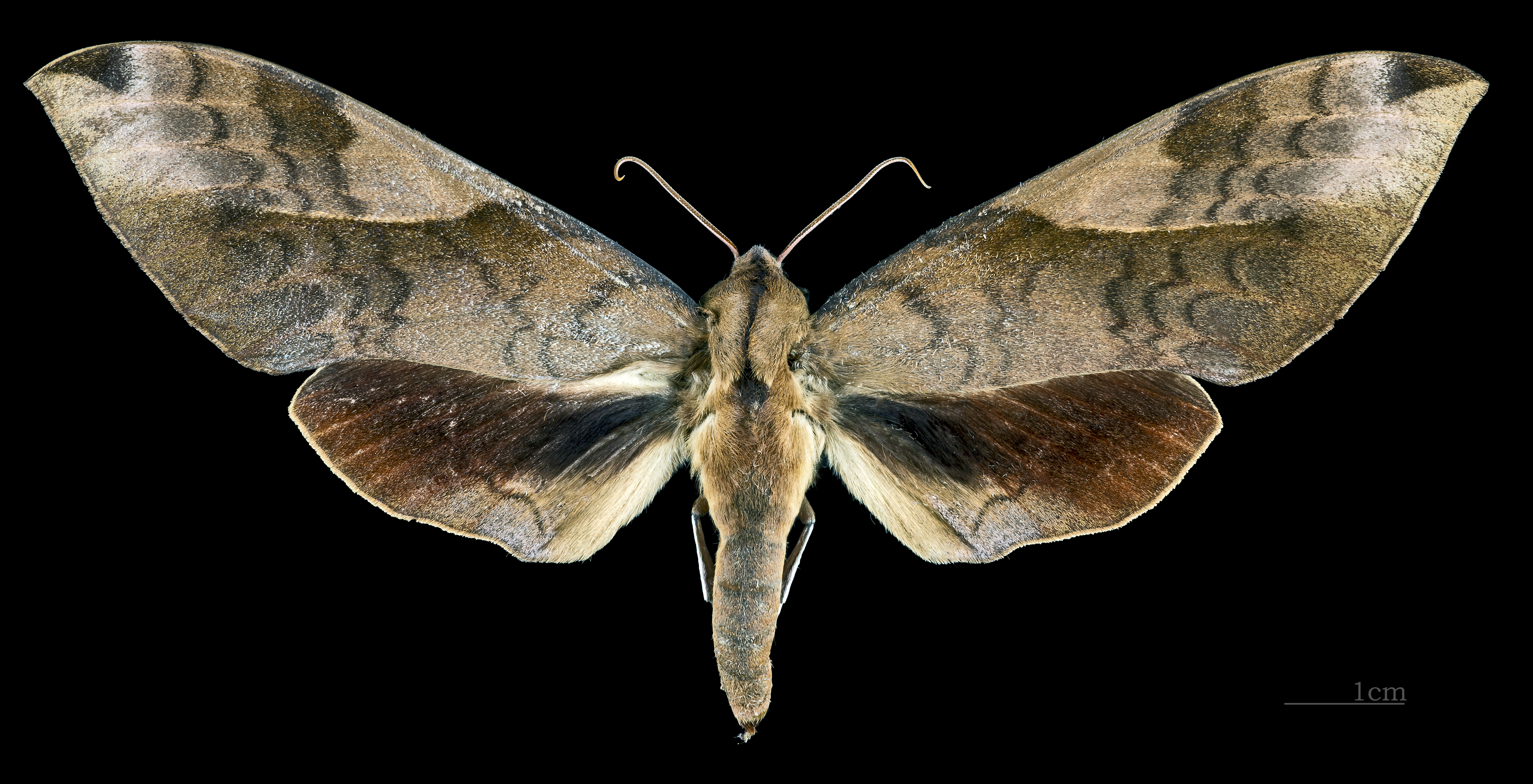
Female C. b. formosana

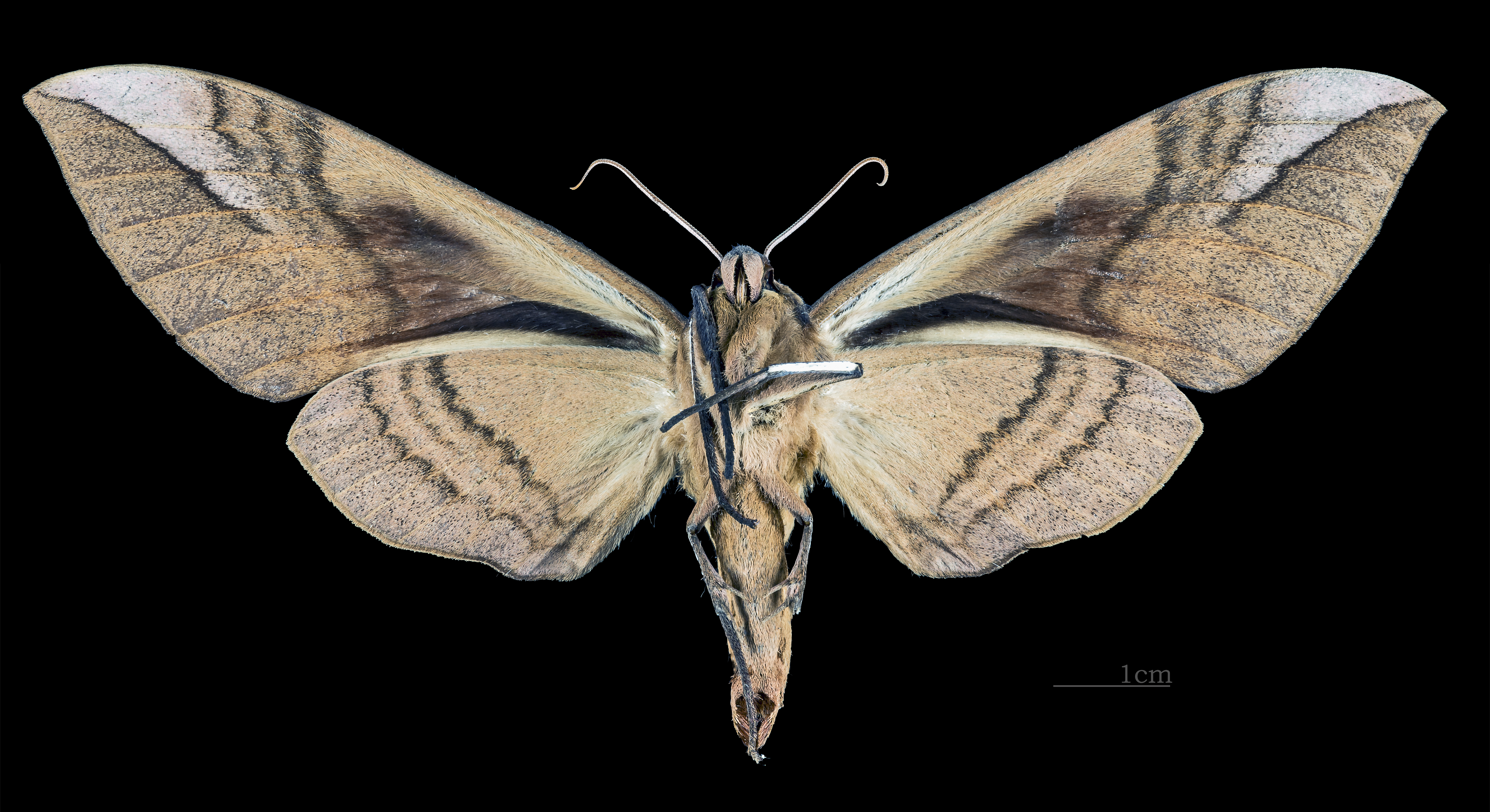
Female C. b. formosana, underside
