= Tân Châu =

Tân Châu may refer to several places in Vietnam:

- Tân Châu, An Giang: a ward in the former Tân Châu town
- Tân Châu, Nghệ An: a commune in the former Diễn Châu district
- Tân Châu, Tây Ninh: a commune in the former Tân Châu district, previously a township and district capital
- Tân Châu (town): a former district-level town of An Giang province, dissolved in 2025 as part of the 2025 Vietnamese administrative reform
- Tân Châu district: a former district of Tây Ninh province, dissolved in 2025 as part of the 2025 Vietnamese administrative reform
