= Tân Châu (town) =

Coordinates: 10°46′26″N 105°14′13″E

- District-level town (Class-4)
- Tân Châu Town; Thị xã Tân Châu
- Seal

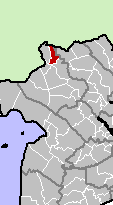
- Location in An Giang province
- Country: Vietnam
- Province: An Giang
- Capital: Tân Châu

Area
  - District-level town (Class-4): 67.83 sq mi (175.68 km^{2})

Population (2019)
  - District-level town (Class-4): 141,211
  - Density: 2,081.8/sq mi (803.80/km^{2})
  - Urban: 54,214
- Time zone: UTC+07:00 (Indochina Time)
- Website: Tan Chau town

Tân Châu was a town (thị xã) of An Giang province in the Mekong Delta region of Vietnam. As of 2019 the town had a population of 141,211. The town covers an area of 175.68 km^{2} (67.83 sq mi).

It is famous for Tân Châu silk with the famous product Lãnh Mỹ A, whose black colour comes from the Diospyros mollis fruit (Vietnamese: Mặc nưa).

Tân Châu was formed in 1757. Tân Châu District was the largest province of Châu Đốc, but was divided in 1929 (with Hong Ngự District) and 1968 (separated from part of Tân Phú district). It was upgraded to town status in 2009 and had a population of 141,211. As part of the 2025 Vietnamese administrative reform, all district-level subdivisions, including Tân Châu, were abolished. The former Tân Châu town now corresponds with the wards of Long Phú, Tân Châu and the communes of Châu Phong, Tân An, Vĩnh Xương.

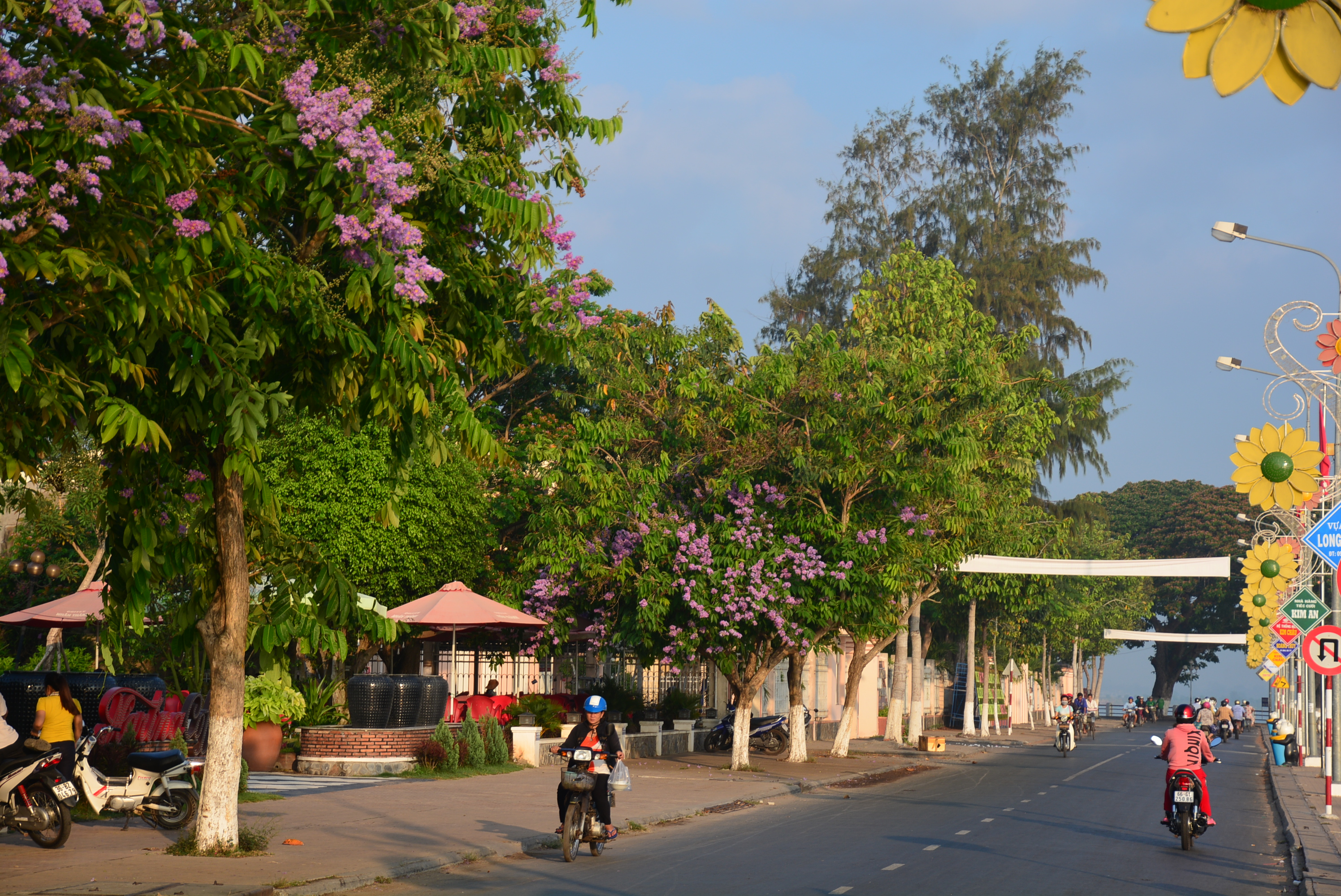
A section of Tiền River embankment in Tân Châu town

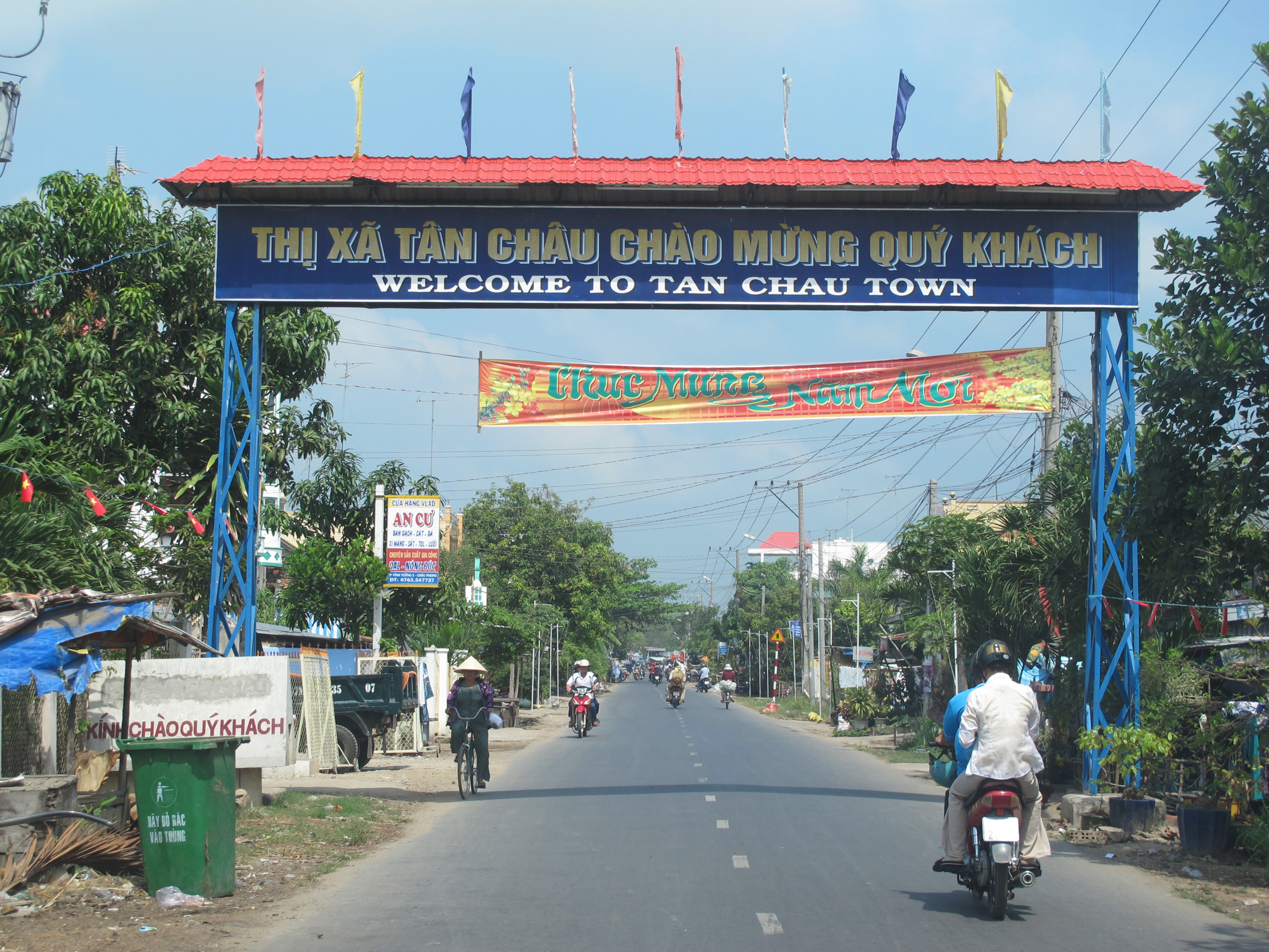

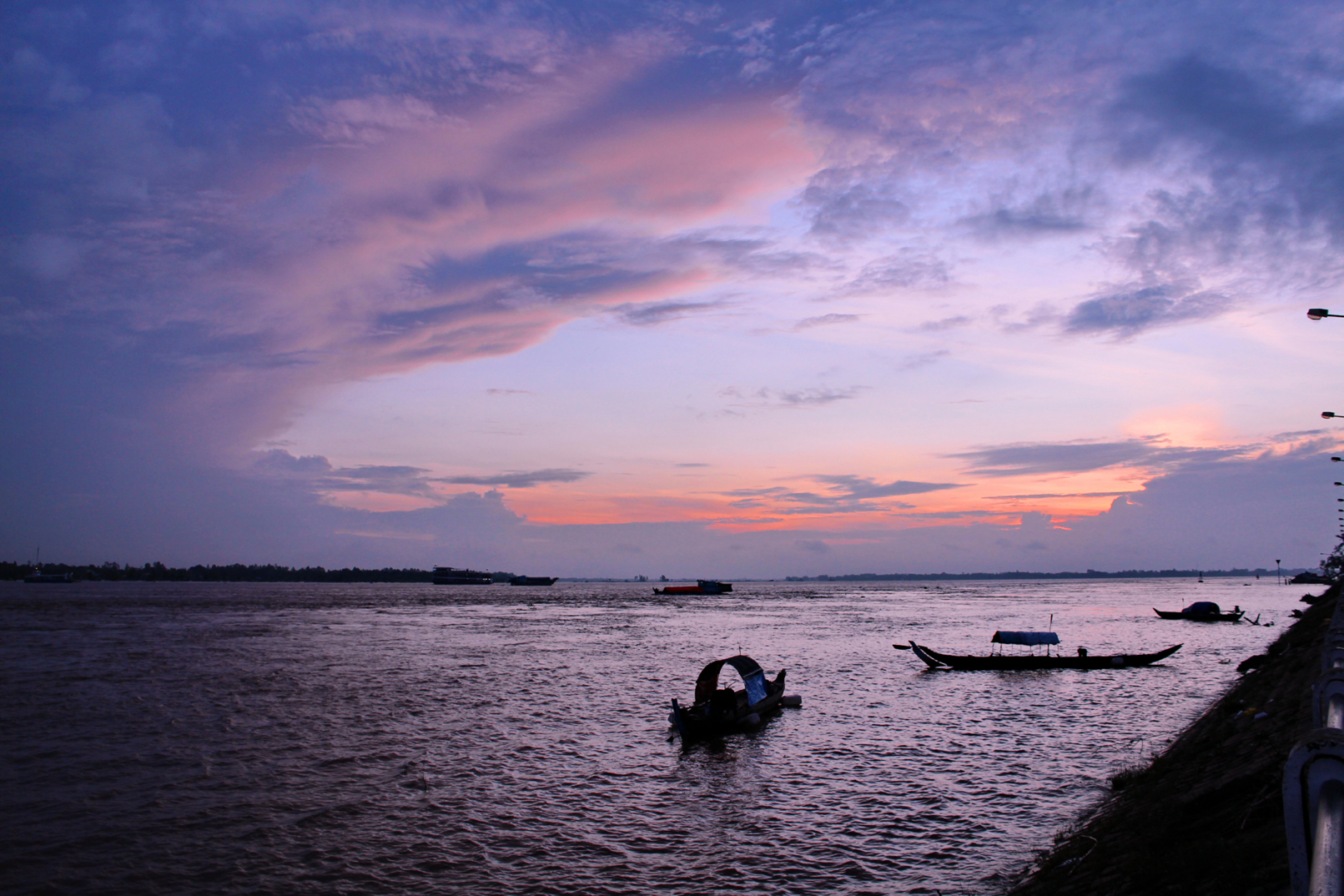
