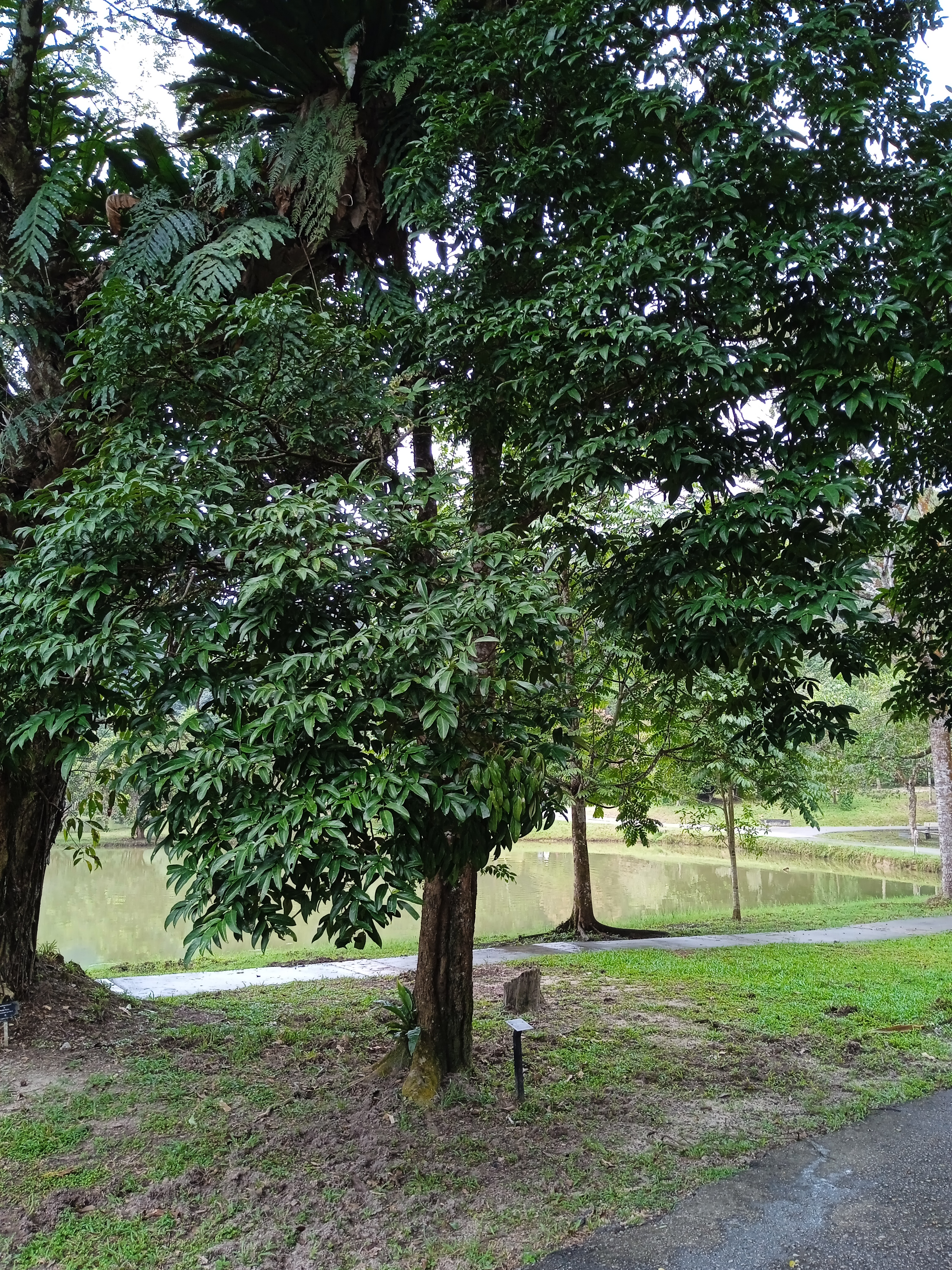
- Adinobotrys atropurpureus

Scientific classification
- Kingdom: Plantae
- Clade: Tracheophytes
- Clade: Angiosperms
- Clade: Eudicots
- Clade: Rosids
- Order: Fabales
- Family: Fabaceae
- Subfamily: Faboideae
- Clade: Inverted repeat-lacking clade
- Genus: Adinobotrys; Dunn

Species
- See text.

= Adinobotrys =

Genus of plants

Adinobotrys is a genus of flowering plant in the family Fabaceae, it's native area ranges from Indo-China to western Malesia. The genus was first described in 1911.

== Description ==
Adinobotrys species are evergreen trees, compared to related genera which are lianas. The standards of its papilionaceous flowers are glabrous (hairless), and the wing petals more or else equal in length to the keel.

== Taxonomy ==
The genus Adinobotrys was first described by Stephen Troyte Dunn in 1911. In 1994, most of the species then placed in Adinobotrys were sunk into Callerya by Anne M. Schot (the remaining species was placed in Afgekia). A molecular phylogenetic study in 2019 showed that Adinobotrys was not closely related to Callerya, and resurrected the genus, initially with two species. The study suggested the relationships, to the level of genera, were as in the following cladogram:

- Inverted repeat-lacking clade (IRLC)
  - Other IRLC members
  - - Adinobotrys
    - - Glycyrrhiza
      - Tribe Wisterieae (including Callerya)

Two further species were added to Adinobotrys in 2020.

=== Species ===
As of December 2022, Plants of the World Online accepted four species:

- Adinobotrys atropurpureus (Wall.) Dunn
- Adinobotrys katinganensis (Adema) J.Compton & Schrire
- Adinobotrys sarawakensis (Adema) J.Compton & Schrire
- Adinobotrys vastus (Kosterm.) J.Compton & Schrire
