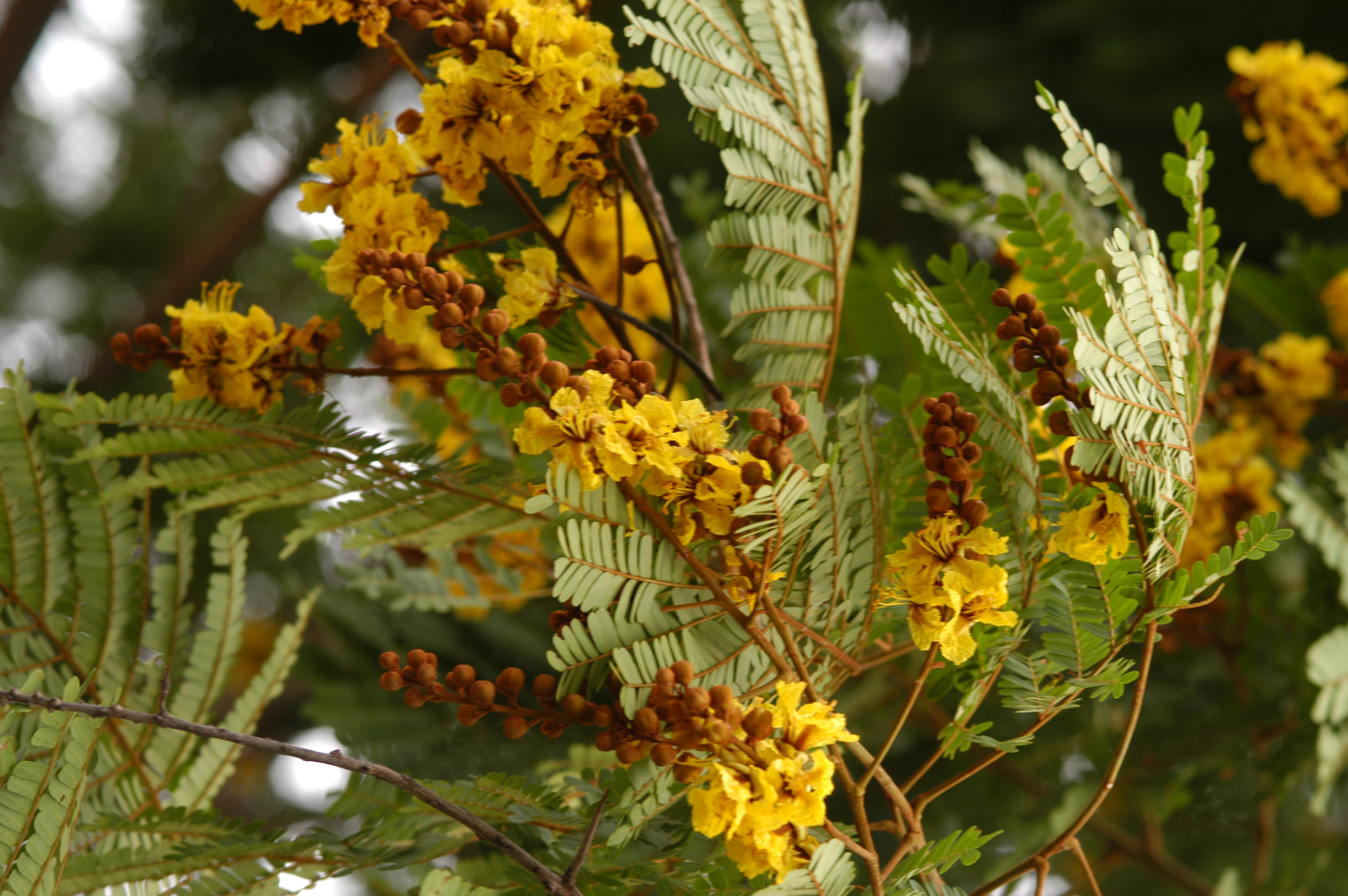
- Peltophorum pterocarpum

Scientific classification
- Kingdom: Plantae
- Clade: Tracheophytes
- Clade: Angiosperms
- Clade: Eudicots
- Clade: Rosids
- Order: Fabales
- Family: Fabaceae
- Subfamily: Caesalpinioideae
- Genus: Peltophorum (Vogel) Benth.

Type species
- Peltophorum vogelianum Benth. [nom. illegit.]

Synonyms
- Baryxylum Lour.

= Peltophorum =

Genus of legumes

Peltophorum is a genus of 5–15 species of flowering plants in the family Fabaceae, subfamily Caesalpinioideae. The genus is native to certain tropical regions across the world, including northern South America, central and southern Africa, Indochina, southeastern China, Malesia, New Guinea, and northern Australia. The species are medium-sized to large trees growing up to 15–25 m tall, rarely 50 m.

== Etymology ==
Peltophorum literally means "shield-bearing": from Greek pelt(ē) (πέλτη, "peltē shield"), with the interfix -o-, -phor(os) ("bearing") and Neo-Latin suffix -um.

It is a reference to the peltate (shield-like) form of the plant's stigma.

== Species ==
As of September 2023, the following species were accepted by Plants of the World Online:

- Peltophorum africanum Sond.
- Peltophorum dasyrhachis (Miq.) Kurz
- Peltophorum dubium (Spreng.) Taub.
- Peltophorum grande Prain
- Peltophorum pterocarpum (DC.) K.Heyne
- Peltophorum racemosum Merr.
- Peltophorum venezuelense L.Cardenas, Rodr.-Rodr. & Varela
