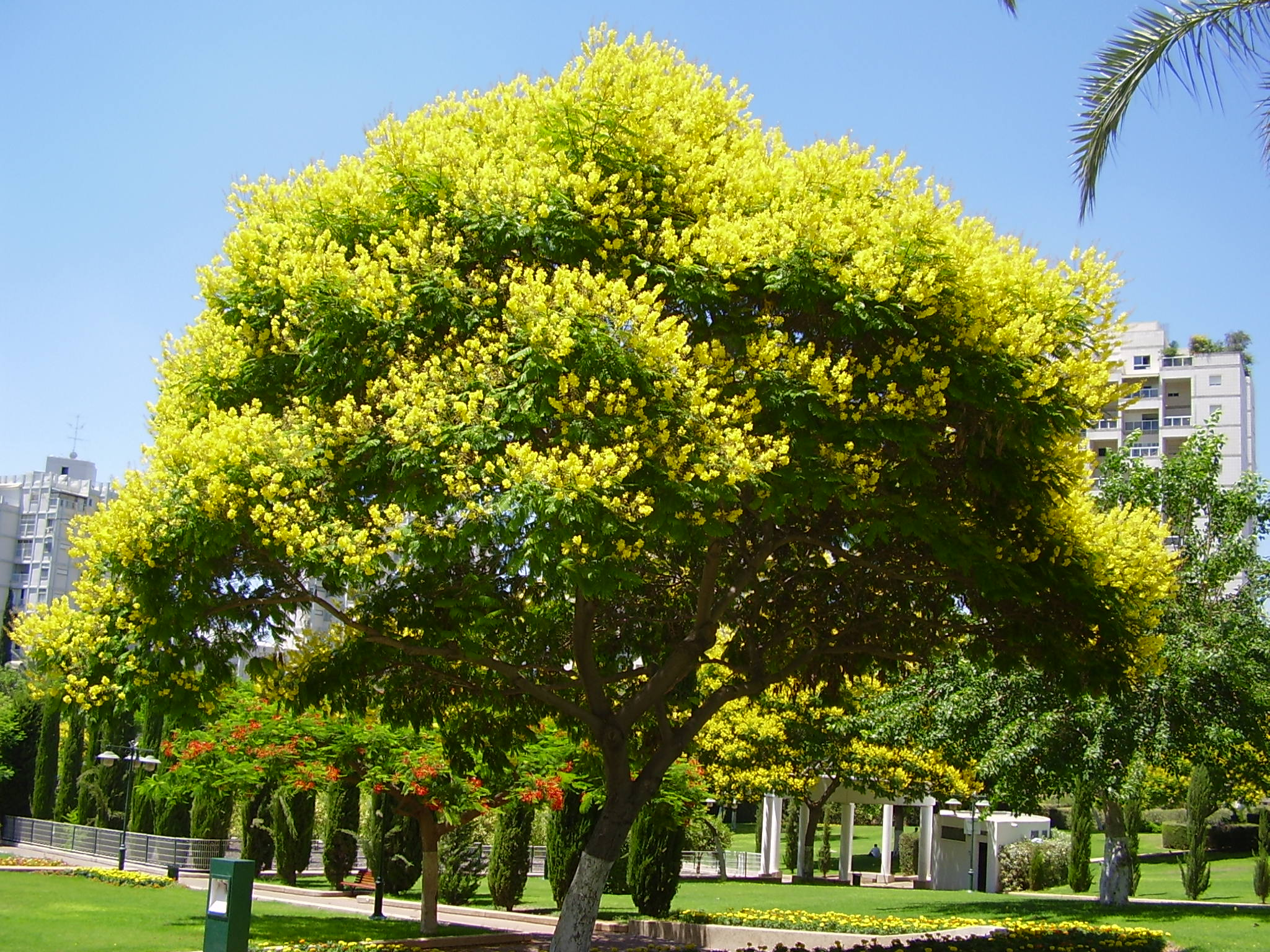

Scientific classification
- Kingdom: Plantae
- Clade: Tracheophytes
- Clade: Angiosperms
- Clade: Eudicots
- Clade: Rosids
- Order: Fabales
- Family: Fabaceae
- Subfamily: Caesalpinioideae
- Genus: Peltophorum
- Species: P. dubium

Binomial name
- Peltophorum dubium (Spreng.) Taub. (1892)

Synonyms
- Baryxylum dubium (Spreng.) Pierre (1899); Brasilettia dubia (Spreng.) Kuntze (1891); Caesalpinia dubia Spreng. (1825)

= Peltophorum dubium =

Species of legume

Peltophorum dubium is a tree in the family Fabaceae and subfamily Caesalpinioideae. This species is known as ibirá-pitá in Argentina and Paraguay, árbol de Artigas in Uruguay, and Cambuí in Brazil. It is a large tree, growing around 20–25 meters, with a more or less straight trunk.

- Foliage: bright green, and deciduous
- Leaves: compound, bipinnate, large. Numerous leaves with a central nervous system.
- Flowers: from 2 cm in diameter, arranged in bundles that end in spikes. The bright visible flowers are in corollas. They flower in the summer and at the beginning of autumn.
- Fruits: indehiscent{?} legume, flat, leathery, and brown.
- Seeds: cylindrical with hard nuts.

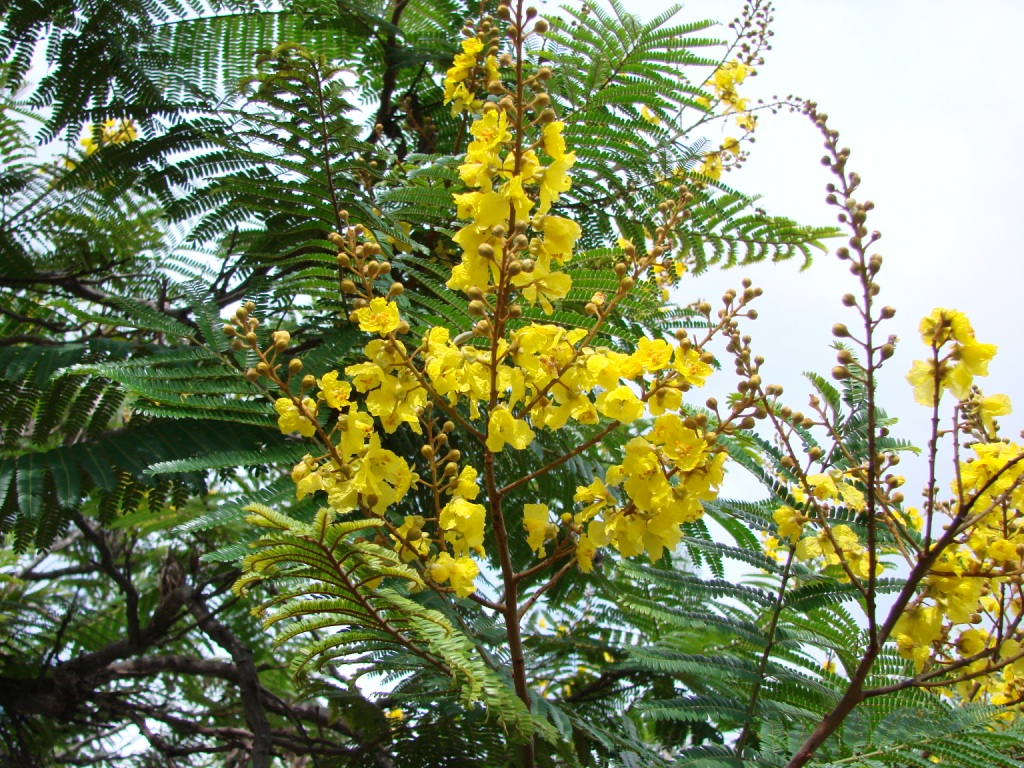
Flowers of Peltophorum dubium.

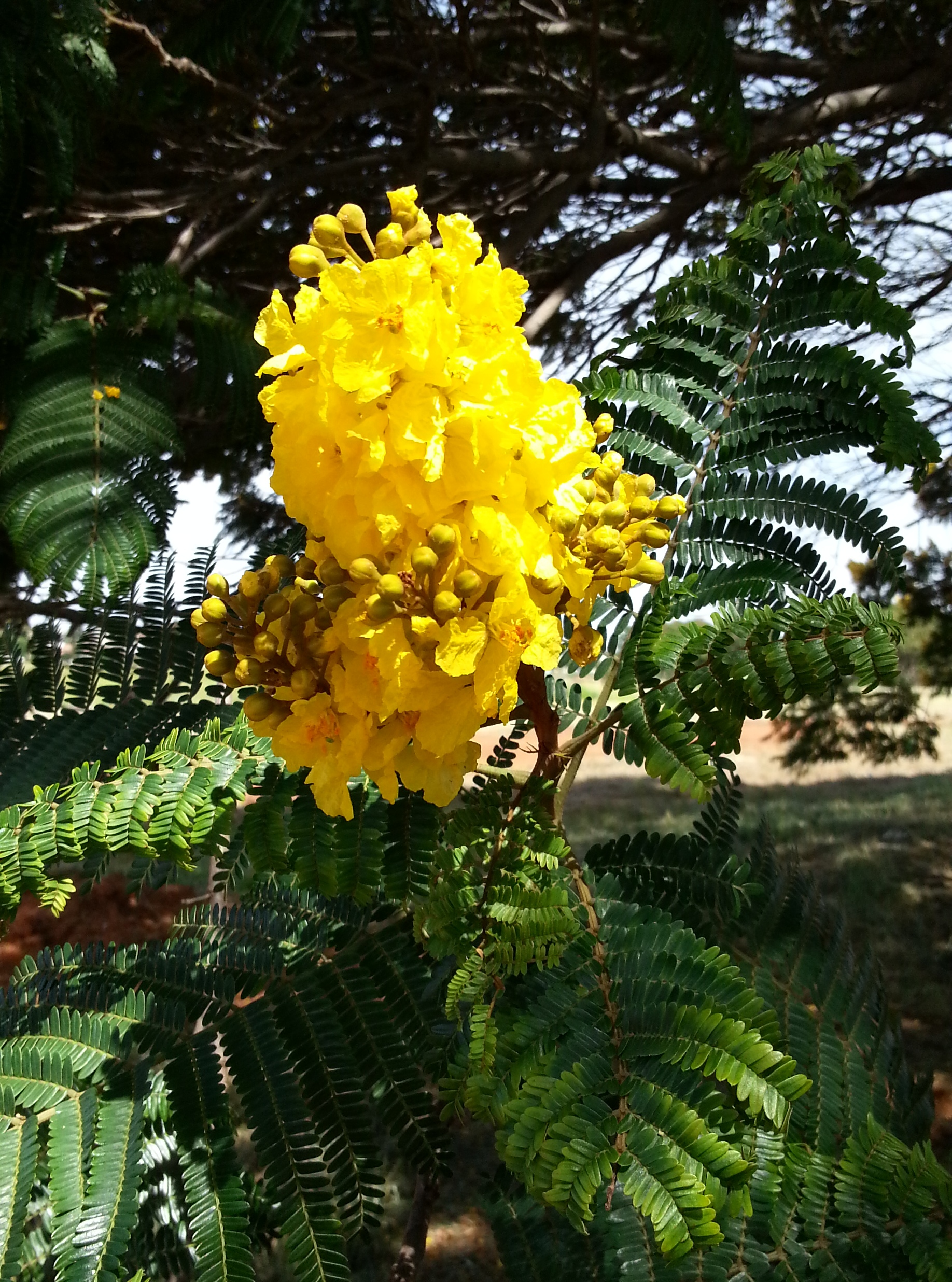
Close-up of flowers

== Habitat ==
They are native to the seasonal deciduous forests of subtropical and temperate regions of South America. They grow on riverbanks in southern Brazil, northeastern Argentina, Paraguay and northern Uruguay. They have also been planted along the avenues of Buenos Aires, Montevideo and Porto Alegre.

== Varieties ==
Three varieties are accepted:

- Peltophorum dubium var. adnatum (Griseb.) Barneby
- Peltophorum dubium var. berteroanum (Urb.) Barneby
- Peltophorum dubium var. dubium (synonym Peltophorum vogelianum Benth.)
