= Adinobotrys vastus =

Conservation status
- Near Threatened (IUCN 3.1)

Scientific classification
- Kingdom: Plantae
- Clade: Tracheophytes
- Clade: Angiosperms
- Clade: Eudicots
- Clade: Rosids
- Order: Fabales
- Family: Fabaceae
- Subfamily: Faboideae
- Genus: Adinobotrys
- Species: A. vastus

Binomial name
- Adinobotrys vastus (Kosterm.) J.Compton & Schrire

Synonyms
- Callerya vasta (Kosterm.) Schot; Millettia vasta Kosterm.

Species of plant

Adinobotrys vastus is a tree or shrub that belongs to the family Fabaceae. Its it is a climbing shrub or tree endemic to Borneo, where it is known from Kalimantan and Sarawak. It grows in primary or secondary lowland rain forest, including in periodically inundated forests, up to 100 metres elevation.
