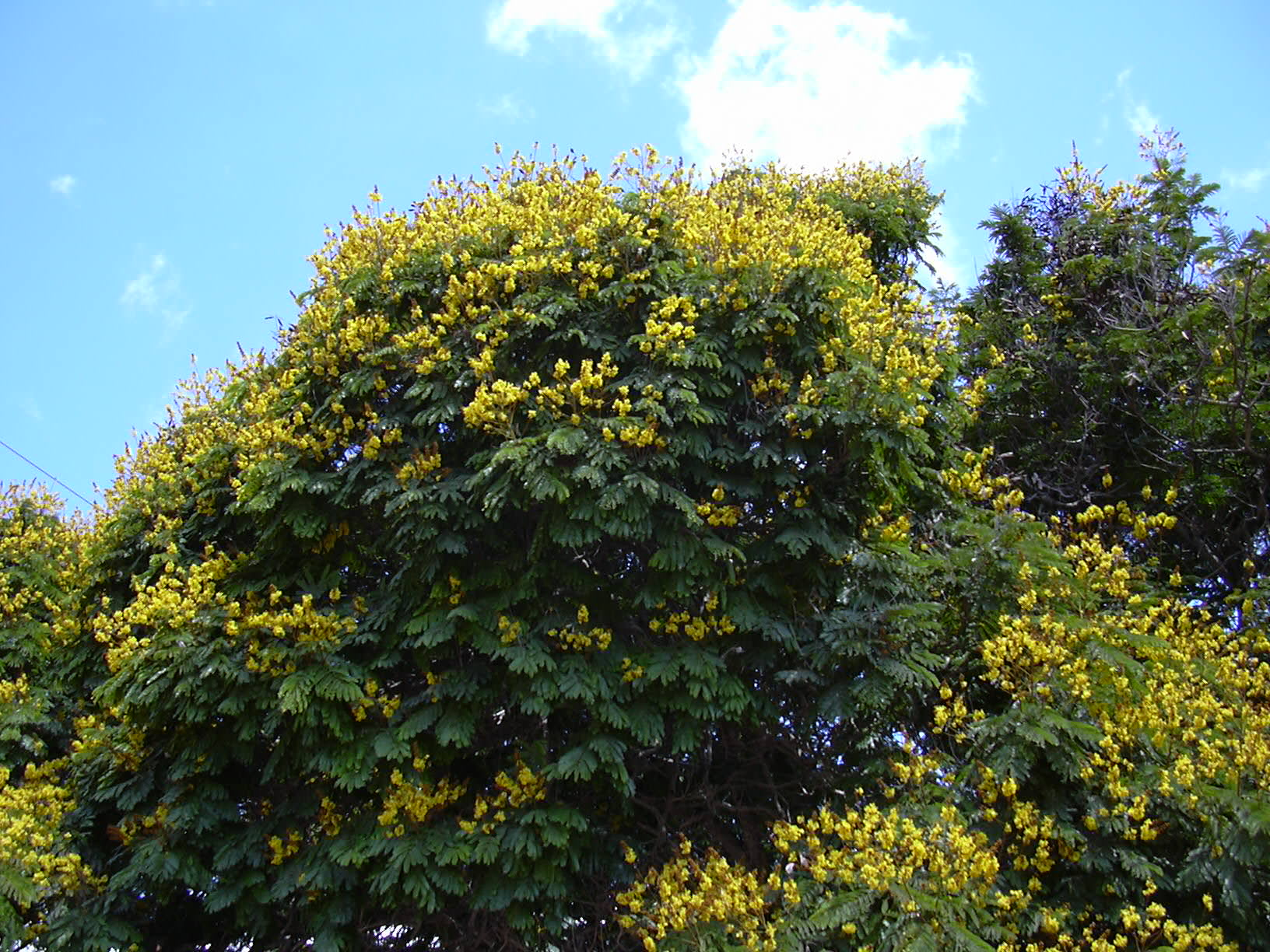

Conservation status
- Least Concern (IUCN 3.1)

Scientific classification
- Kingdom: Plantae
- Clade: Tracheophytes
- Clade: Angiosperms
- Clade: Eudicots
- Clade: Rosids
- Order: Fabales
- Family: Fabaceae
- Subfamily: Caesalpinioideae
- Genus: Peltophorum
- Species: P. pterocarpum

Binomial name
- Peltophorum pterocarpum (DC.) K.Heyne

Synonyms
- Baryxylum inerme (Roxb.) Pierre; Caesalpinia arborea Miq.; Caesalpinia ferruginea Decne.; Caesalpinia gleniei Thwaites; Caesalpinia inermis Roxb.; Inga pterocarpa DC.; Inga pterocarpum DC. [Spelling variant]; Peltophorum ferrugineum (Decne.) Benth.; Peltophorum inerme (Roxb.) Naves; Peltophorum roxburghii (G.Don) Degener; Poinciana roxburghii G.Don

= Peltophorum pterocarpum =

Species of legume

Peltophorum pterocarpum (commonly known as copperpod, yellow-flamboyant, yellow flametree, yellow poinciana or yellow-flame) is a species of tree in the family Fabaceae, native to tropical areas from Indo-China to northern Australia. It produces masses of golden flowers in the summer, making it a popular ornamental tree around the world. It was first described in 1825.

== Description ==
It is a deciduous tree growing to 15–25 m (rarely up to 50 m) tall, with a trunk diameter of up to 1 m belonging to the family Fabaceae and sub-family Caesalpinioideae. The leaves are bipinnate, 30–60 cm long, with 16–20 pinnae, each pinna with 20–40 oval leaflets 8–25 mm long and 4–10 mm broad. The flowers are yellow, 2.5–4 cm in diameter and produced in large compound raceme up to 20 cm long. Pollens are approximately 50 microns in size.

The fruit is a pod 5–10 cm long and 2.5 cm broad, red at first, ripening black, and containing one to four seeds. Trees begin to flower after about four years.

== Distribution ==
Peltophorum pterocarpum is native to tropical southeast Asia and northern Australasia: in Australia (including islands off the Northern Territory coast); Sri Lanka; in Southeast Asia to Indonesia, Malaysia, Papua New Guinea, Philippines, Thailand and Vietnam.

== Uses ==
The tree is widely grown in tropical regions as an ornamental tree, particularly in India, Nigeria, Pakistan, and Florida and Hawaii in the United States. Used as decorating flower in Telangana State's Batukamma festival. The trees have been planted alternately with Delonix regia (Poinciana) in India, as a common scheme for avenue trees, giving a striking yellow and red effect in summer.

The wood has a wide variety of uses, including cabinet-making and the foliage is used as a fodder crop. The brownish colour called sogan typical of batik cloth from inland Java in Indonesia is produced from P. pterocarpum, which is known there as soga.

== Gallery ==
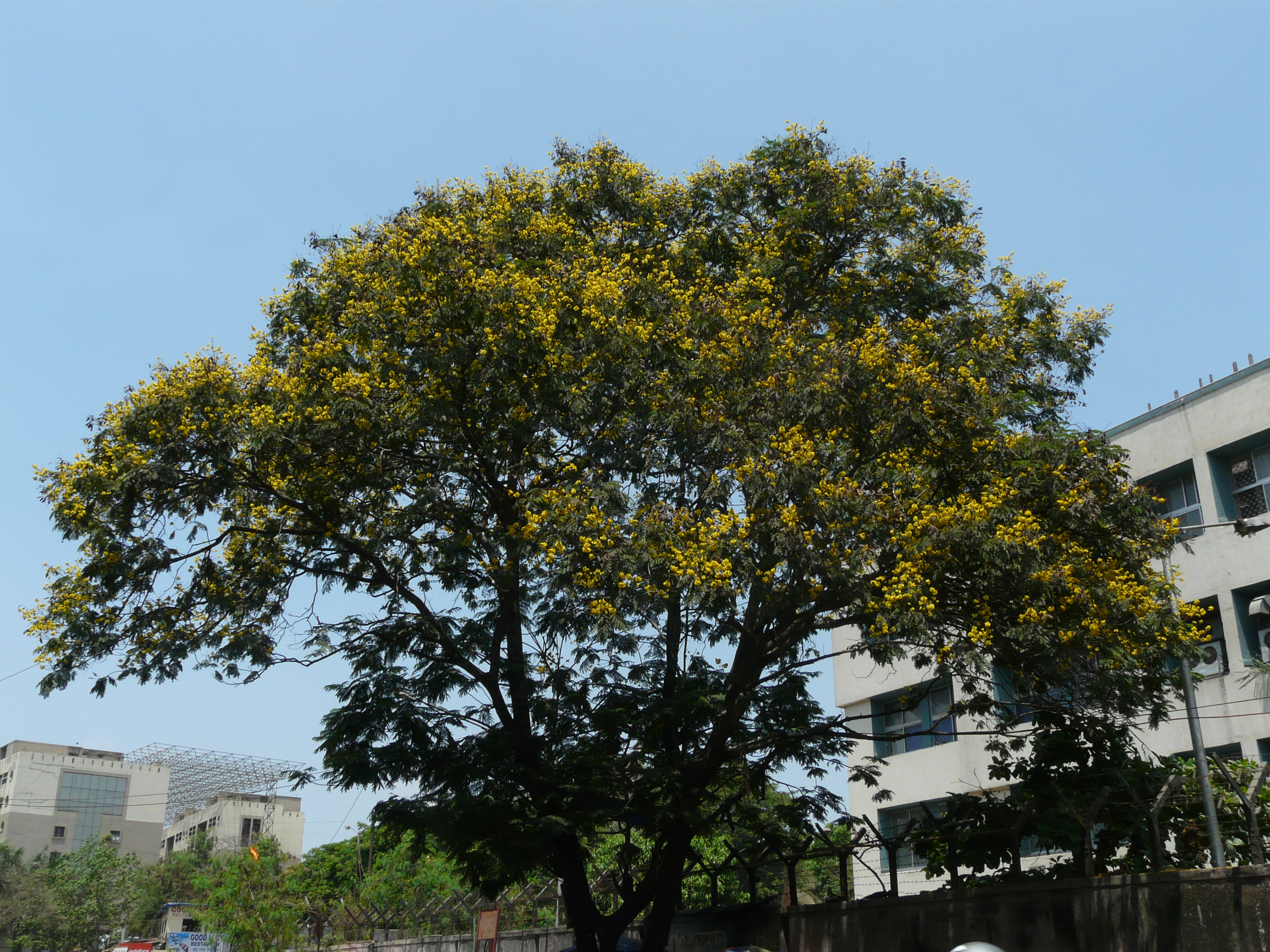
Habit

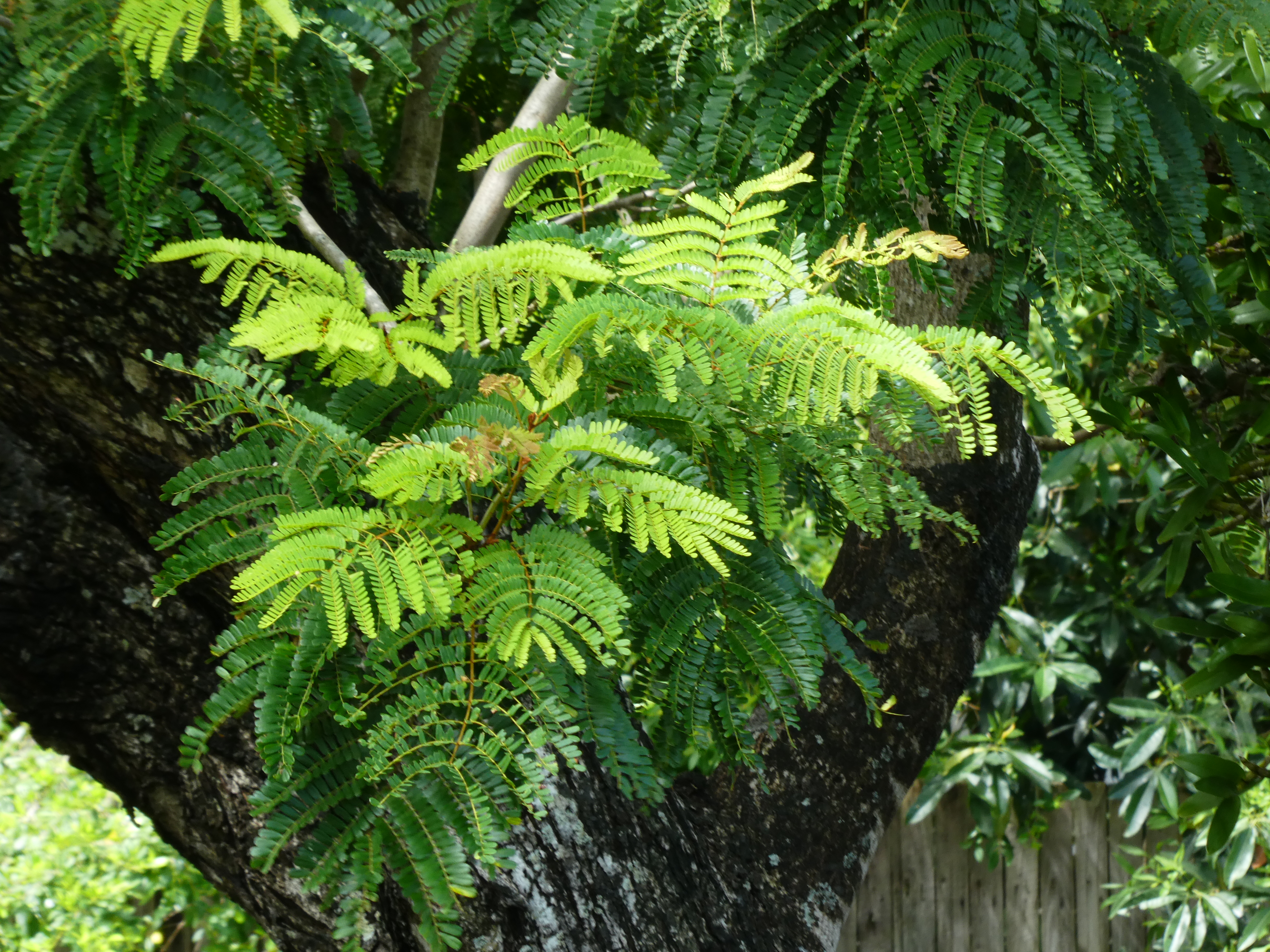
Leaves

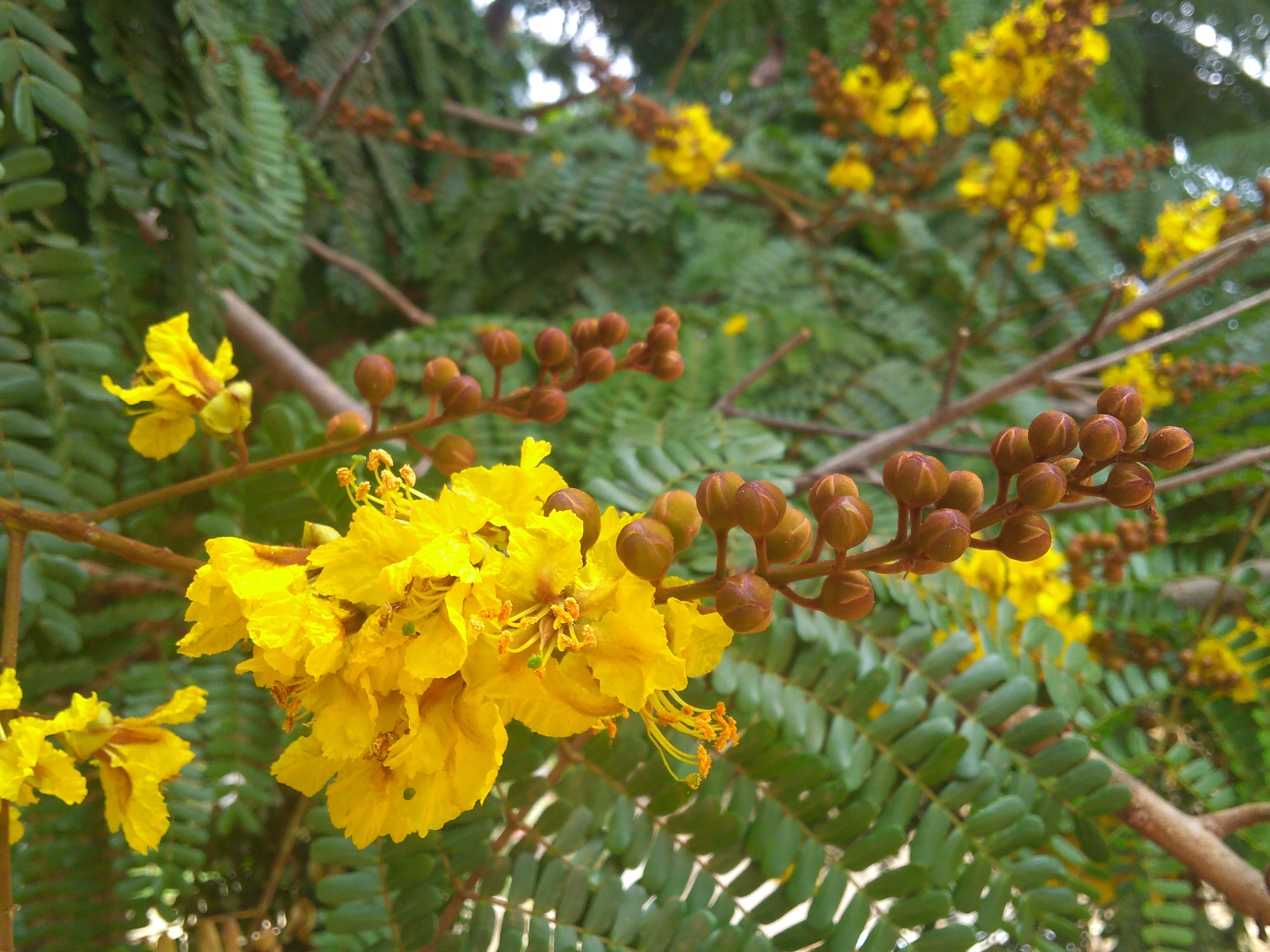
Flowers and buds

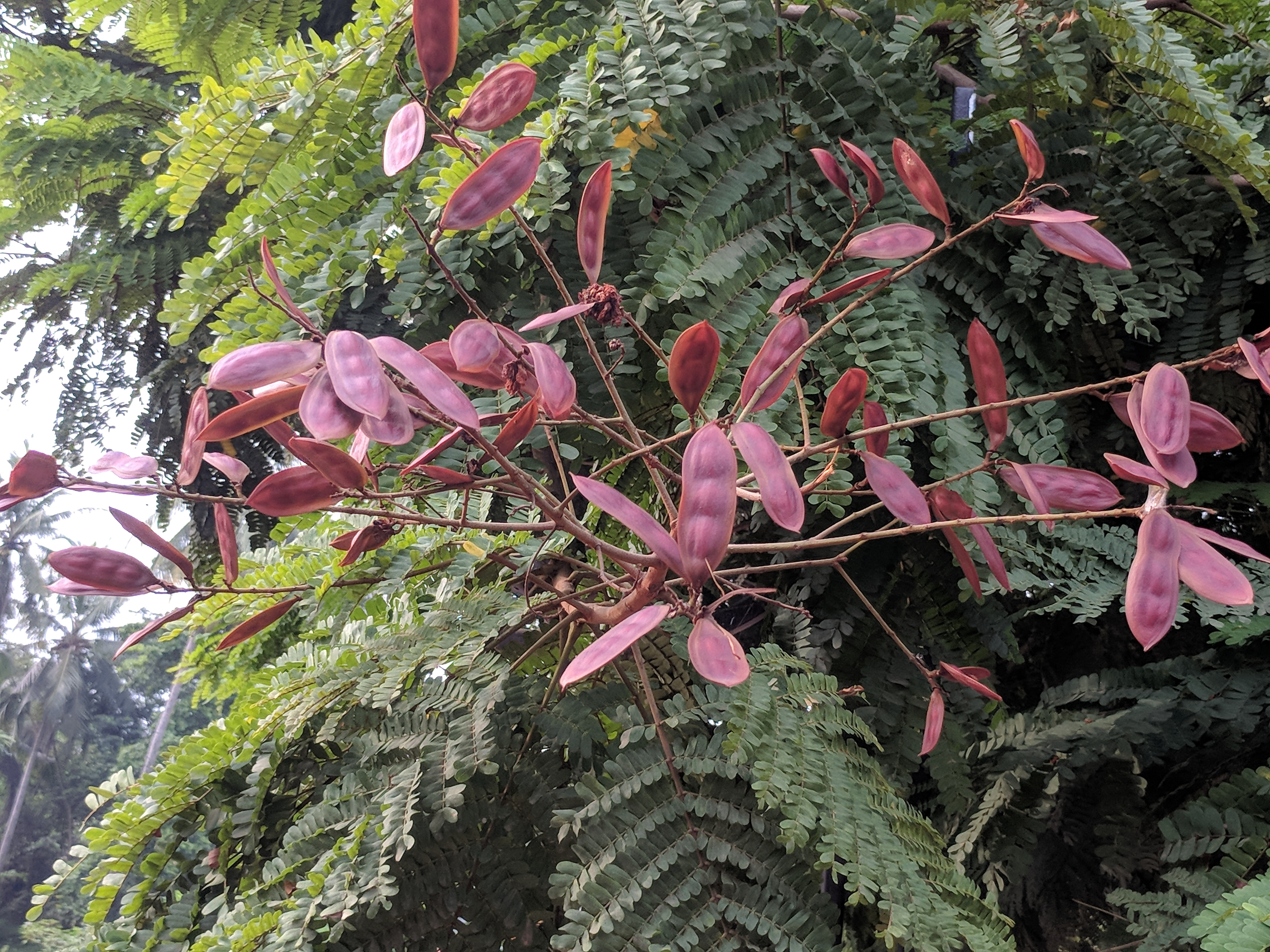
Ripening fruit

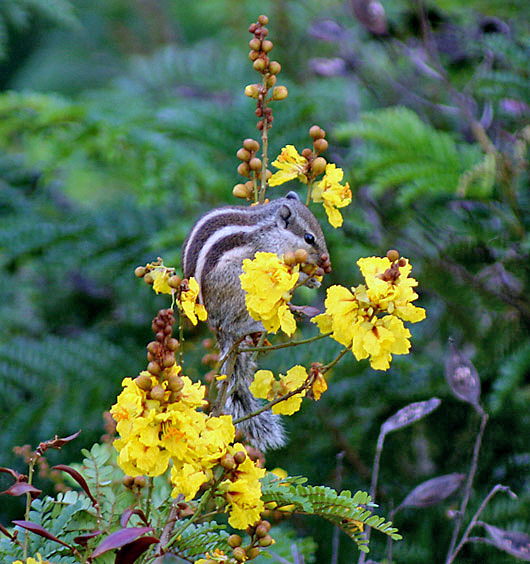
Flowering tree with squirrel in Kolkata, India
