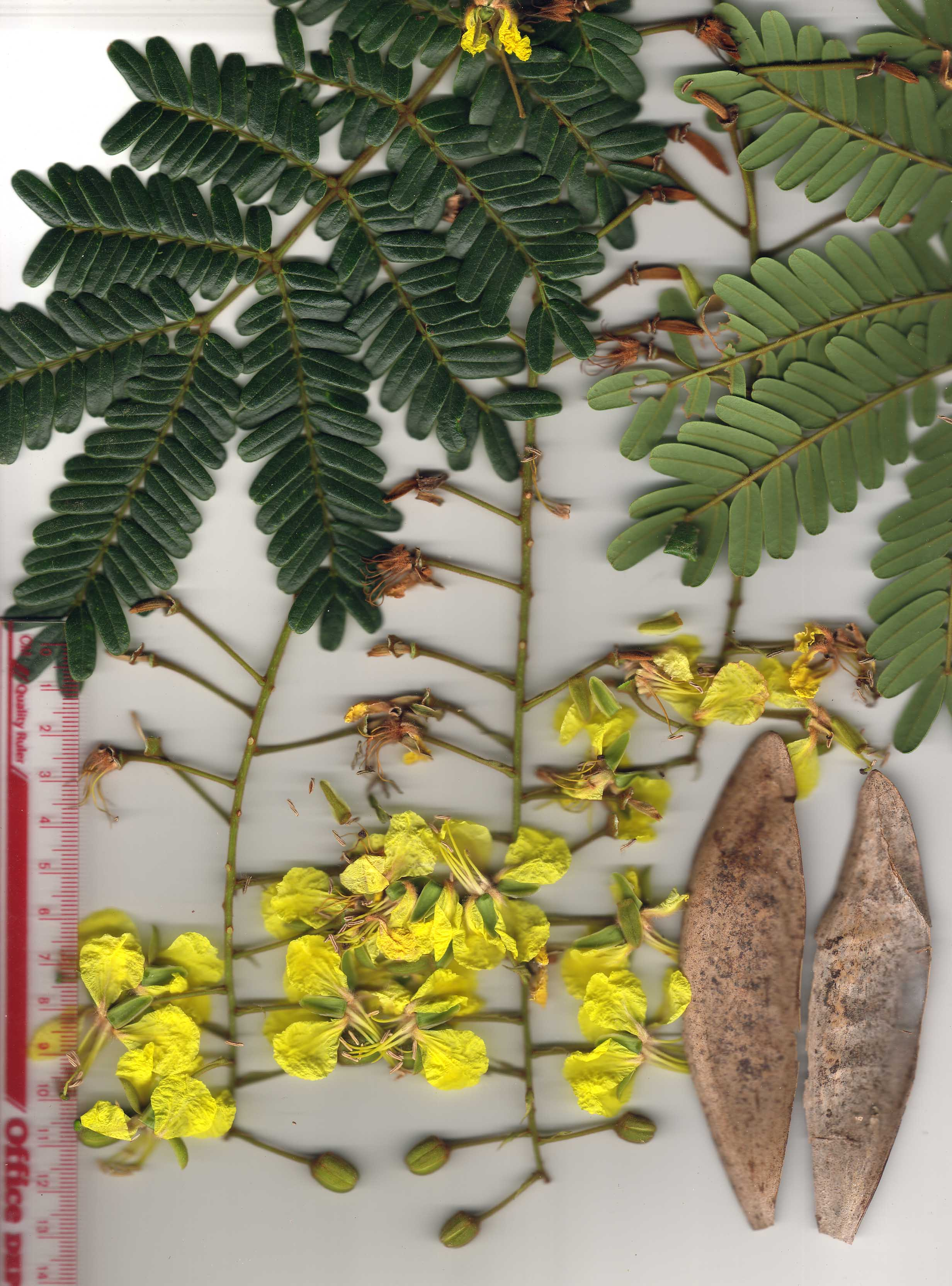

Scientific classification
- Kingdom: Plantae
- Clade: Embryophytes
- Clade: Tracheophytes
- Clade: Spermatophytes
- Clade: Angiosperms
- Clade: Eudicots
- Clade: Rosids
- Order: Fabales
- Family: Fabaceae
- Subfamily: Caesalpinioideae
- Genus: Peltophorum
- Species: P. dasyrhachis

Binomial name
- Peltophorum dasyrhachis (Miq.) Kurz

= Peltophorum dasyrhachis =

Species of legume

Peltophorum dasyrhachis is a deciduous flowering tree growing to 30 meters. It is native to Southeast Asia (Cambodia, Indonesia, Laos, Malaysia, Thailand, Vietnam) and introduced to Africa (Ivory Coast, Sierra Leone, Tanzania, Uganda). It produces drooping racemes of fragile yellow flowers that bloom in Thailand in early March.
