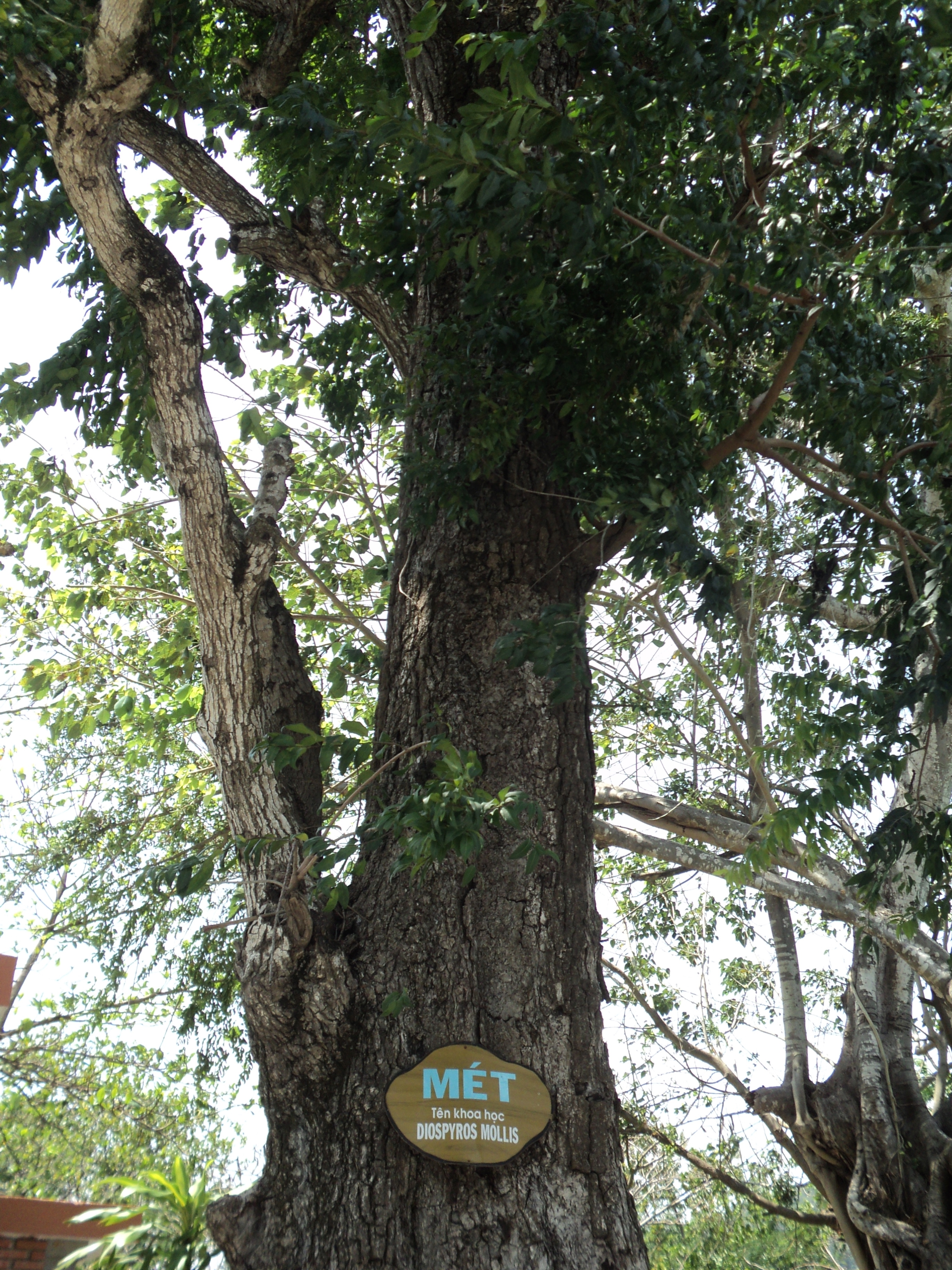
- In Vietnam

Scientific classification
- Kingdom: Plantae
- Clade: Tracheophytes
- Clade: Angiosperms
- Clade: Eudicots
- Clade: Asterids
- Order: Ericales
- Family: Ebenaceae
- Genus: Diospyros
- Species: D. mollis

Binomial name
- Diospyros mollis Griff.

= Diospyros mollis =

Species of tree

Diospyros mollis is a tree in the family Ebenaceae, native to Southeast Asia. It is known as makleua (มะเกลือ) in Thai.
