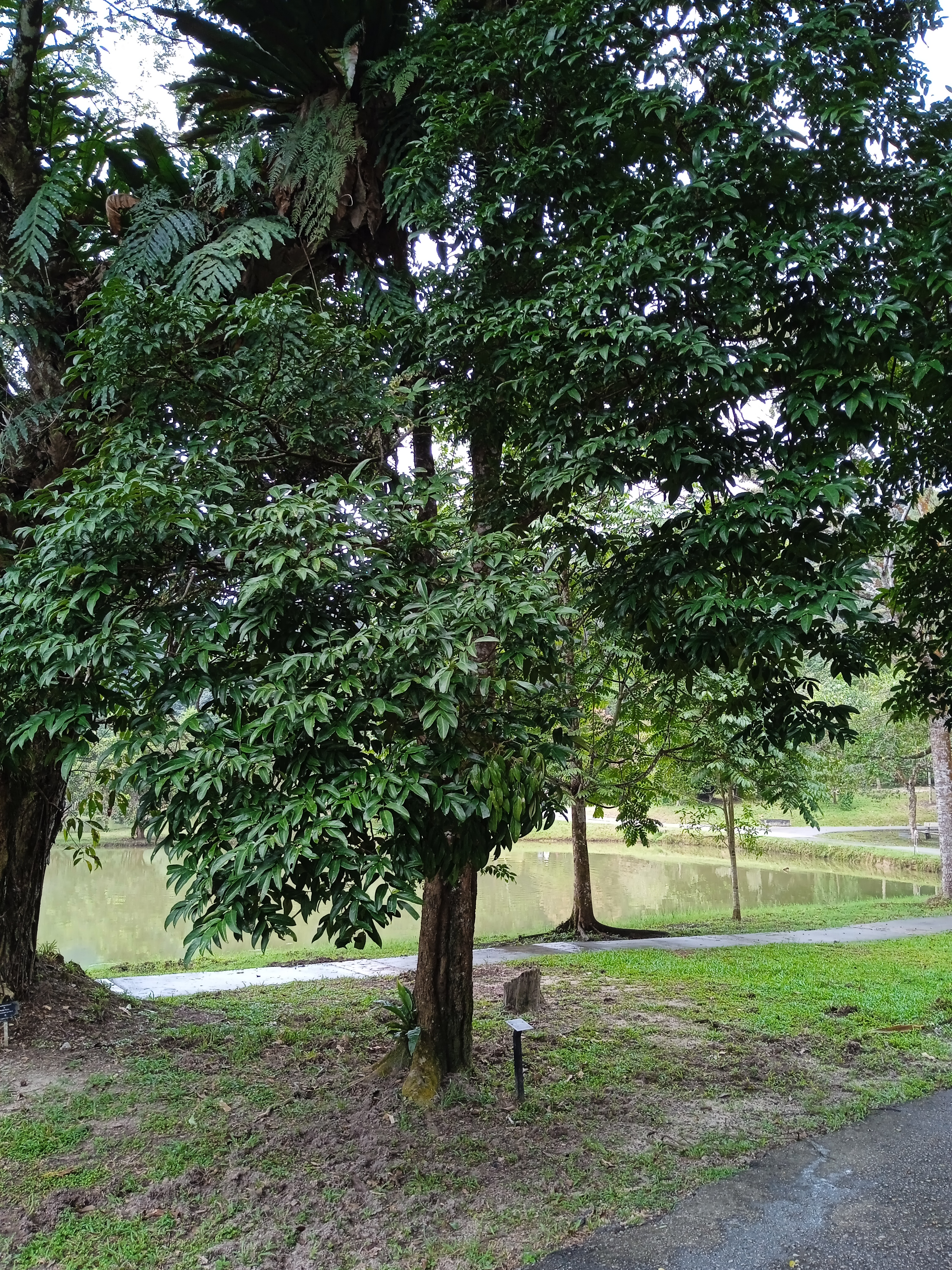

Scientific classification
- Kingdom: Plantae
- Clade: Tracheophytes
- Clade: Angiosperms
- Clade: Eudicots
- Clade: Rosids
- Order: Fabales
- Family: Fabaceae
- Subfamily: Faboideae
- Genus: Adinobotrys
- Species: A. atropurpureus

Binomial name
- Adinobotrys atropurpureus (Wall.) Dunn

Synonyms
- Callerya atropurpurea (Wall.) Schot; Millettia atropurpurea (Wall.) Benth.; Padbruggea atropurpurea (Wall.) Craib; Phaseoloides atropurpureum (Wall.) Kuntze; Pongamia atropurpurea Wall.; Whitfordiodendron atropurpureum (Wall.) Dunn; Callerya atropurpurea var. pubescens (Craib) L.K.Phan; Millettia paniculata Miq.; Padbruggea pubescens Craib; Pongamia glandulosa Griff.; Robinia megasperma W.Hunter; Whitfordiodendron pubescens (Craib) Burkill

= Adinobotrys atropurpureus =

Species of tree

Adinobotrys atropurpureus, synonym Callerya atropurpurea, is a species of tree in the family Fabaceae. It has dense, purple flowers, and seeds that are usually longer than 5 cm (2 in) in length.

== Description ==
The tree can be found throughout Southeast Asia, from Myanmar to Java. In Malaysia, Adinobotrys atropurpureus or Callerya atropurpurea locally known as chicha, girah payah, jenerek, jenerik, jeneris, kedang belum, merbong, tulang daing, tulang daeng, and tualang daing. Meanwhile in Singapore, Adinobotrys atropurpureus is called tulang daing, jenaris, tulang dain, or jenerek in Singapore Malay language; and purple millettia in English language.

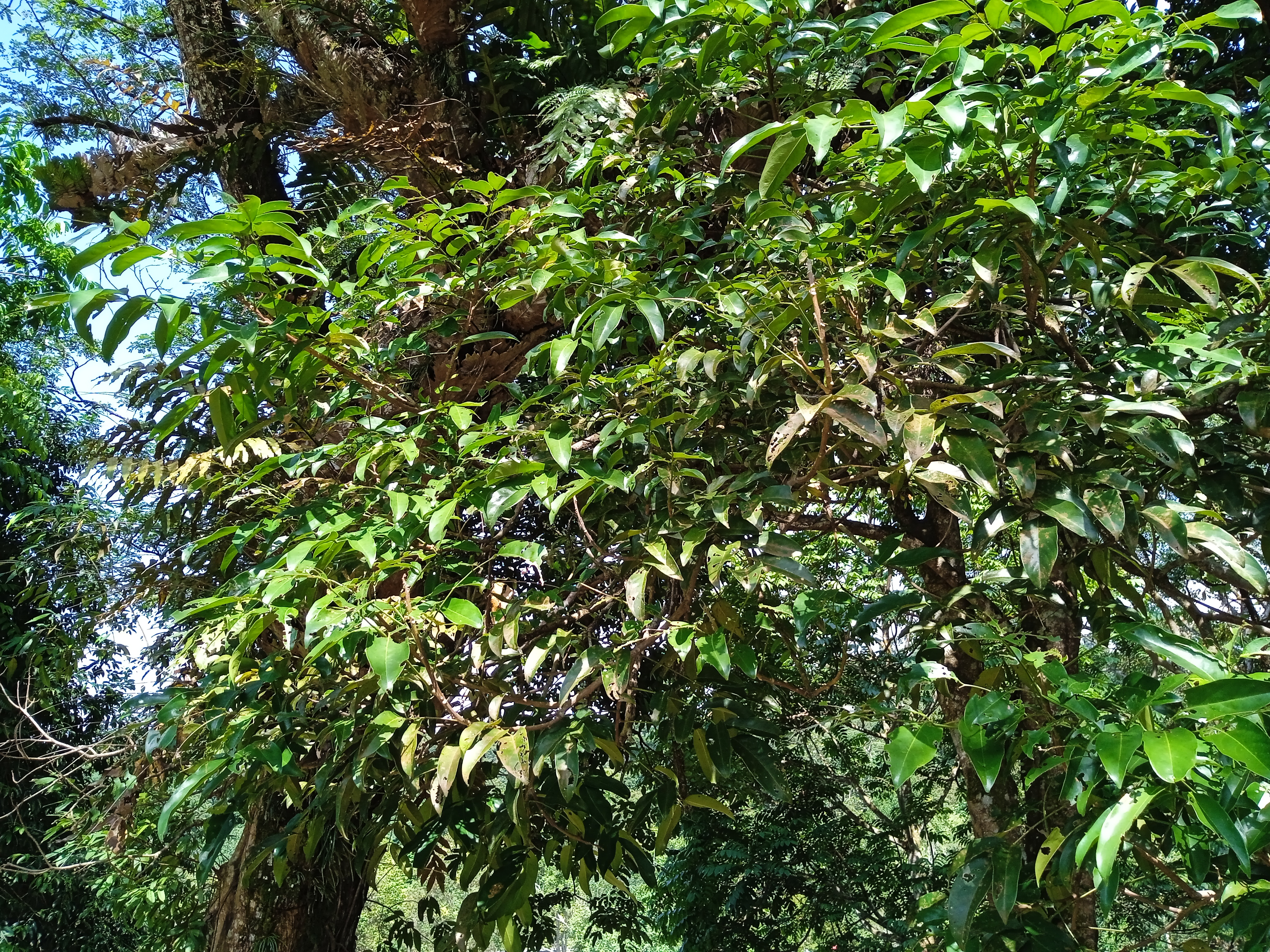
Adinobotrys atropurpureus leaves

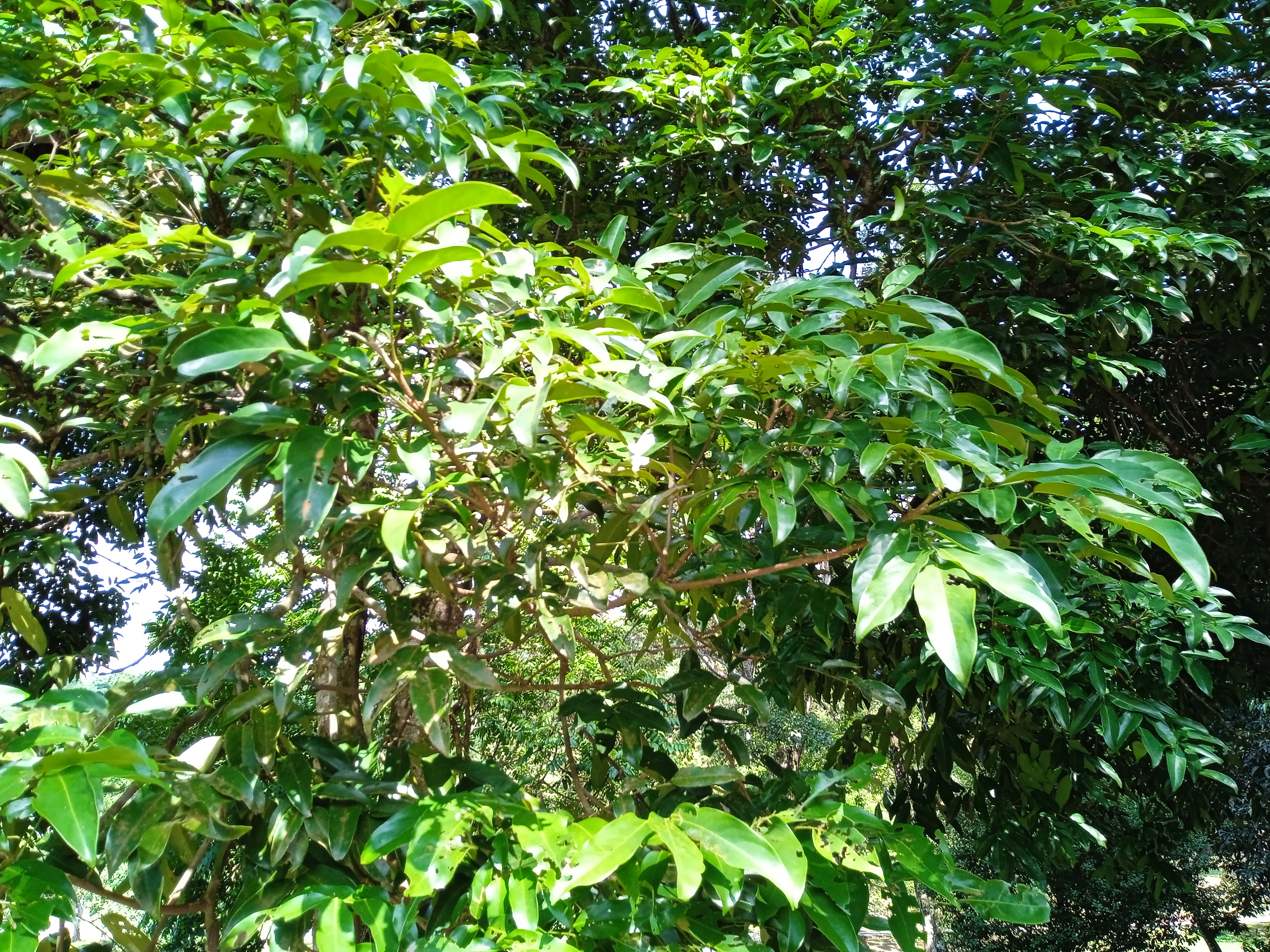
Adinobotrys atropurpureus leaves

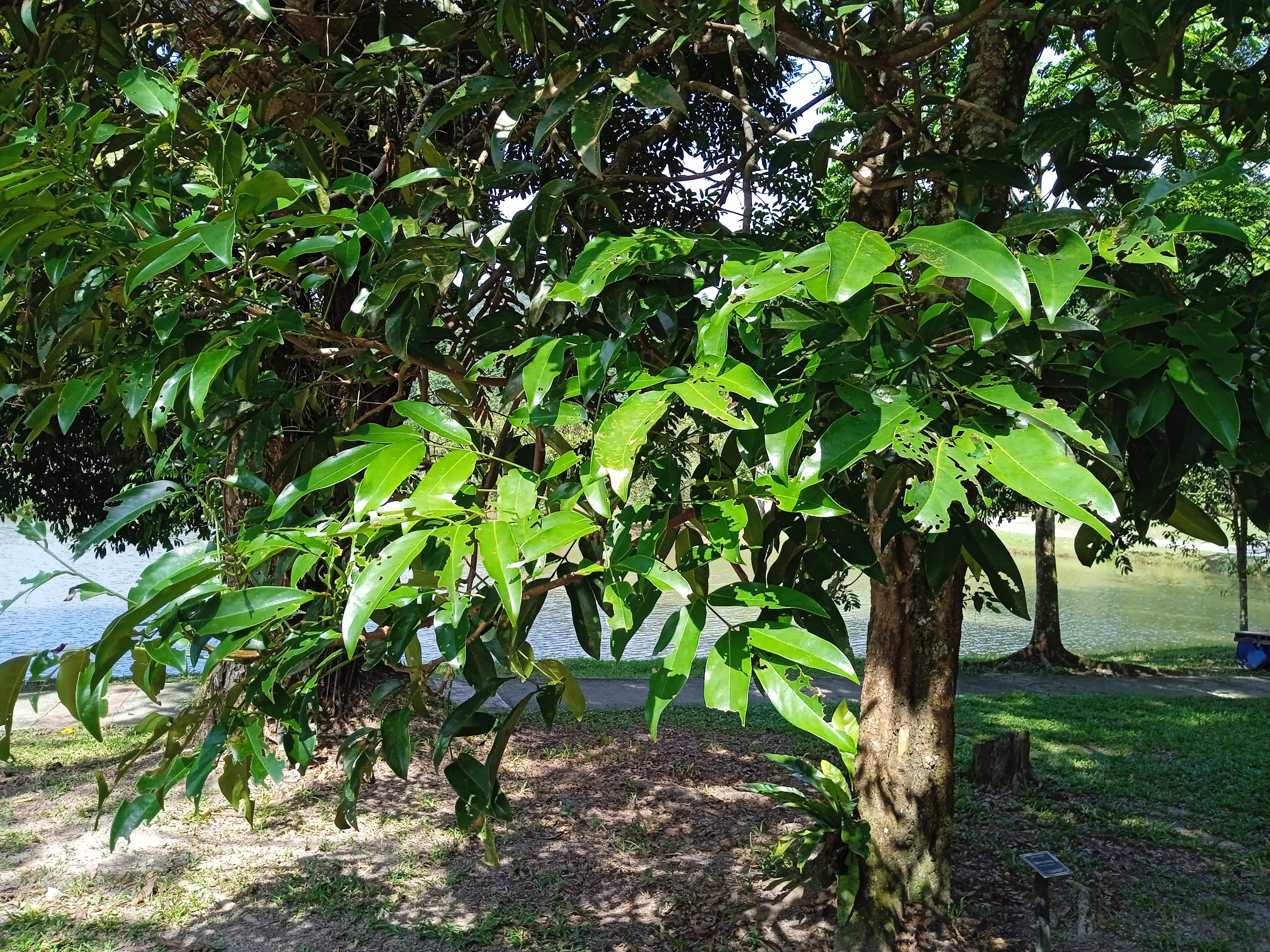
Adinobotrys atropurpureus leaves

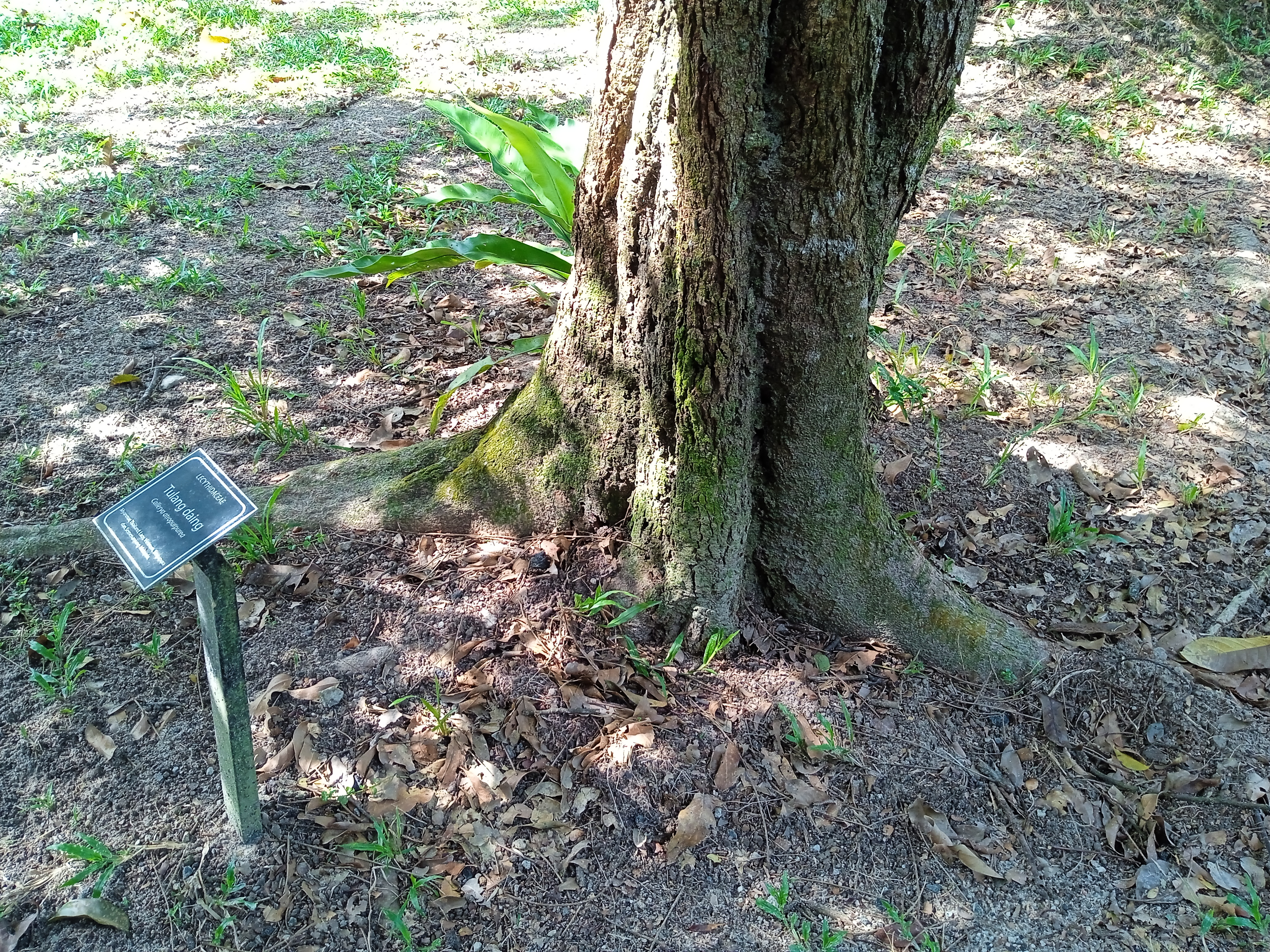
Adinobotrys atropurpureus bark

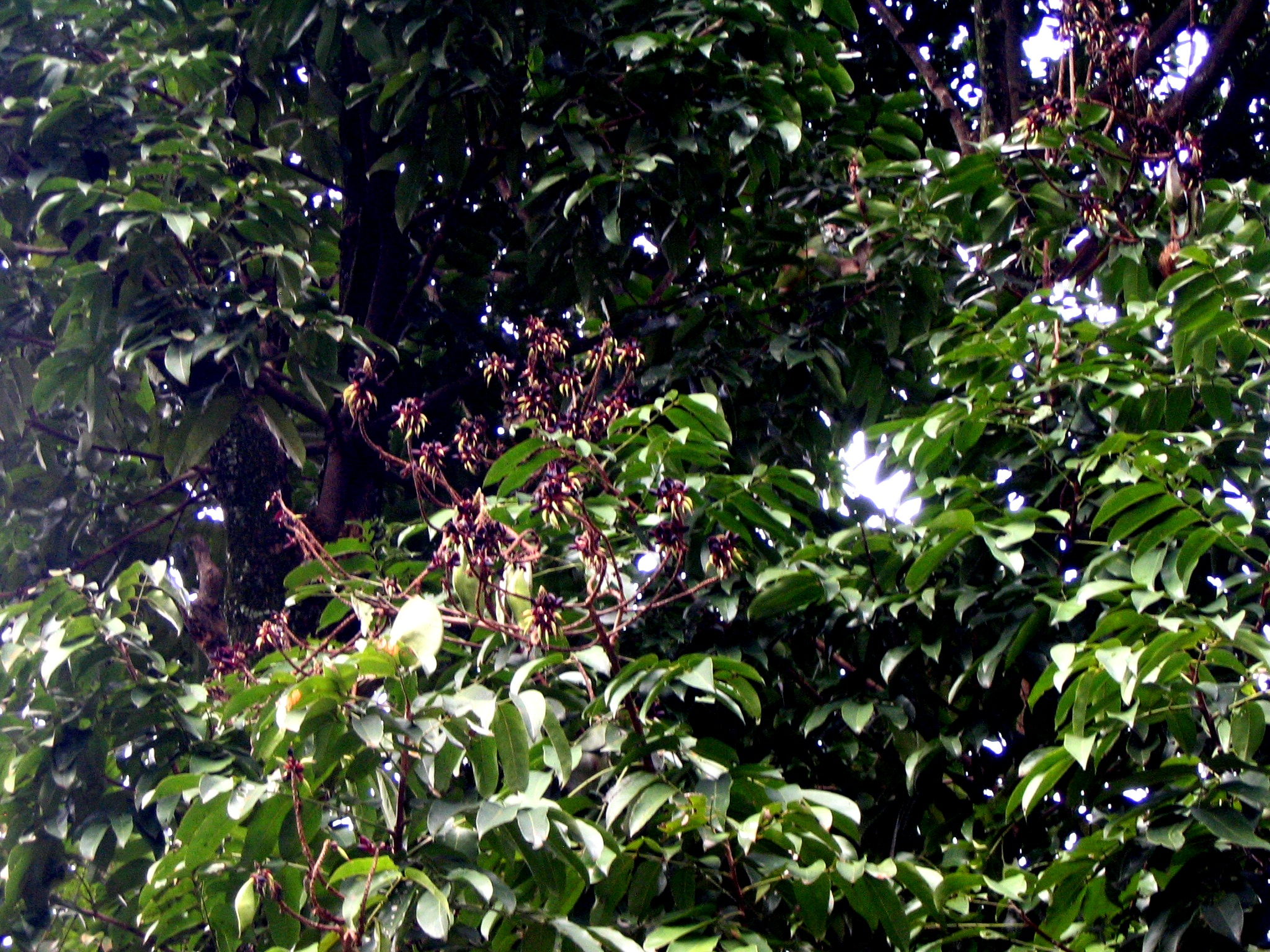
Adinobotrys atropurpureus flower

== Symbolism ==
In Thailand it is the provincial tree of Nakhon Si Thammarat Province.
