= Huai Yang railway station =

Railway station in Huai Yang, Thailand

Coordinates: 11.6050°N 99.6722°E

Huai Yang ห้วยยาง

General information
- Location: Phetkasem-Sathani Huai Yang Road, Huai Yang Subdistrict, Thap Sakae District, Prachuap Khiri Khan
- Owner: State Railway of Thailand
- Line: Southern Line
- Platforms: 1
- Tracks: 2

Other information
- Station code: หย.

Services
Preceding station	State Railway of Thailand	Following station
Wang Duan towards Hua Lamphong or Krung Thep Aphiwat	Southern Line	Thung Pradu towards Su-ngai Kolok
Location

Huai Yang railway station is a railway station located in Saeng Arun Subdistrict, Thap Sakae District, Prachuap Khiri Khan. It is a class 3 railway station located 329.079 km (204.5 mi) from Thon Buri railway station.

The station is located about 5 km (3.1 mi) from Wanakon Beach and 6 km (3.7 mi) from Huai Yang Waterfall. Thai minibuses and motorbike taxis are available to both of these attractions.

== Train services ==
- Ordinary 254/255 Lang Suan-Thon Buri-Lang Suan
- Special Express 40 Surat Thani-Bangkok
- Special Express 43 Bangkok-Surat Thani
