= Thap Sakae railway station =

Railway station in Thailand

Coordinates: 11.4981°N 99.6228°E

Thap Sakae ทับสะแก

General information
- Location: Ban Thap Sakae-Ban Laemkum Road, Mu 4 (Ban Thap Sakae), Thap Sakae Subdistrict, Thap Sakae District, Prachuap Khiri Khan
- Owner: State Railway of Thailand
- Platforms: 1
- Tracks: 3

Other information
- Station code: สก.

Services
Preceding station	State Railway of Thailand	Following station
Thung Pradu towards Hua Lamphong or Krung Thep Aphiwat	Southern Line	Don Sai towards Su-ngai Kolok
Location

Thap Sakae railway station is a railway station located in Thap Sakae Subdistrict, Thap Sakae District, Prachuap Khiri Khan. It is a class 2 railway station, located 342.066 km (212.5 mi) from Thon Buri railway station.

== Train services ==
- Rapid No. 169/170 Bangkok-Yala-Bangkok
- Rapid No. 173/174 Nakhon Si Thammarat-Bangkok
- Ordinary No. 254/255 Lang Suan-Thon Buri-Lang Suana
