= Thung Pradu railway station =

Railway station in Thap Sakae, Thailand

Coordinates: 11.5262°N 99.6358°E

Thung Pradu ทุ่งประดู่

General information
- Location: Thung Pradu 1 Road, Mu 2 (Ban Thung Pradu), Thap Sakae Subdistrict, Thap Sakae District, Prachuap Khiri Khan
- Owner: State Railway of Thailand
- Line: Southern Line
- Platforms: 1
- Tracks: 2

Other information
- Station code: ทด.

Services
Preceding station	State Railway of Thailand	Following station
Huai Yang towards Hua Lamphong or Krung Thep Aphiwat	Southern Line	Thap Sakae towards Su-ngai Kolok
Location

Thung Pradu railway station is a railway station located in Thap Sakae Subdistrict, Thap Sakae District, Prachuap Khiri Khan. It is a class 3 railway station located 338.605 km (210.4 mi) from Thon Buri railway station.

Due to minimal passenger usage, Thung Pradu is being converted railway halt and will officially be in operation when the double tracking of the line section is completed.

== Train services ==
- Ordinary 254/255 Lang Suan-Thon Buri-Lang Suan
