= Ao Siam National Park =

National park in Thailand

- IUCN category II (national park)
- Location within Thailand
- Location: Mae Ramphueng Subdistrict, Bang Saphan District, Prachuap Khiri Khan Province, 77140, Thailand
- Coordinates: 11°12′37″N 99°31′23.4″E
- Area: 31.94 km^{2} (12.33 sq mi)
- Established: Preparing (open some sources)
- Governing body: Department of National Parks, Wildlife and Plant Conservation

Ao Siam National Park (Thai: อุทยานแห่งชาติอ่าวสยาม, RTGS: Utthayan Haeng Chat Ao Sayam, pronounced [ʔùt.tʰā.jāːn hɛ̀ŋ tɕʰâːt ʔàːw sā.jǎːm]) is a national park that is preparing to reopen in Thailand. It is an area on the western coast of the Gulf of Thailand.

== Geography ==
Ao Siam National Park is covering the Pa Klang Ao Forest Park, Mae Ramphueng Forest Park, Koh Talu, Koh Sing, and Koh Sanghk, Bang Saphan District Prachuap Khiri Khan Province. The three islands are 8 kilometers (5.0 mi), 6 kilometers (3.7 mi) and 5 kilometers (3.1 mi), respectively, from the coast. There are also some areas located in the drafting area of the Ministry of Natural Resources and Environment (Thailand) regarding environmental protection measures in some areas of Thap Sakae District, Kui Buri District, Sam Roi Yot District, Mueang Prachuap Khiri Khan District, Bang Saphan District, and Bang Saphan Noi District Prachuap Khiri Khan Province.

== Location ==
Ao Siam National Park in overview PARO 3 (Phetchaburi branch)

1) Ao Siam National Park in overview PARO 3 (Phetchaburi branch)

	National park
1	Ao Siam
2	Hat Wanakon
3	Kaeng Krachan
4	Khao Sam Roi Yot
5	Kui Buri
6	Namtok Huai Yang

	Wildlife sanctuary
7	Prince Chumphon North Park (upper)
	Non-hunting area
8	Cha-am
9	Khao Chaiyarat
10	Khao Krapuk– Khao Tao Mo

	Forest park
11	Cha-am
12	Huai Nam Sap
13	Khao Nang Phanthurat
14	Khao Ta Mong Lai
15	Klang Ao
16	Mae Ramphueng
17	Pran Buri
18	Thao Kosa

== See also ==
- List of national parks of Thailand
- DNP - Ao Siam National Park
