= Ang Thong, Thap Sakae =

Subdistrict in Prachuap Khiri Khan Province

Coordinates: 11.431618°N 99.555491°E

Ang Thong ตำบลอ่างทอง
- Subdistrict
- Motto: เมืองทองเนื้อเก้า มะพร้าวสับปะรด สวยสดหาดเขาถ้ำ งามล้ำน้ำใจ
- Interactive map of Ang Thong
- Country: Thailand
- Province: Prachuap Khiri Khan
- District: Thap Sakae

Government
  - Type: Subdistrict Administrative Organization (SAO)
  - Head of SAO: Tanin Bunnee

Population (2025)
  - Total: 5,269
- Time zone: UTC+7 (ICT)

Ang Thong (Thai: ตำบลอ่างทอง, pronounced [ʔàːŋ.tʰɔ̄ːŋ]) is a tambon (subdistrict) of Thap Sakae District, in Prachuap Khiri Khan province, Thailand. In 2025, it had a population of 5,269 people.

== History ==
Ang Thong was a tambon in Bang Saphan District with the area combined with Na Hu Kwang Subdistrict. The population increased in 1977 and was later divided into two tambons.

== Administration ==
=== Central administration ===
The tambon is divided into eleven administrative villages (mubans).

No.	Name	Thai	Population
1.	Ang Thong	อ่างทอง	556
2.	Jak Lang	จักรล่าง	389
3.	Sida-ngam	สีดางาม	387
4.	Vangyang	วังยาง	275
5.	Jak Bon	จักรบน	899
6.	Nonghoi	หนองหอย	628
7.	Kaopor	เขาปอ	595
8.	Tabaek Prong	ตะแบกโพรง	489
9.	Kok Tahom	โคกตาหอม	305
10.	Ko Sida	เกาะสีดา	187
11.	Tung Put	ทุ่งพุฒ	559
