= Namtok Huai Yang National Park =

National park in Thailand

Huai Yang National Park อุทยานแห่งชาติน้ำตกห้วยยาง
- IUCN category II (national park)
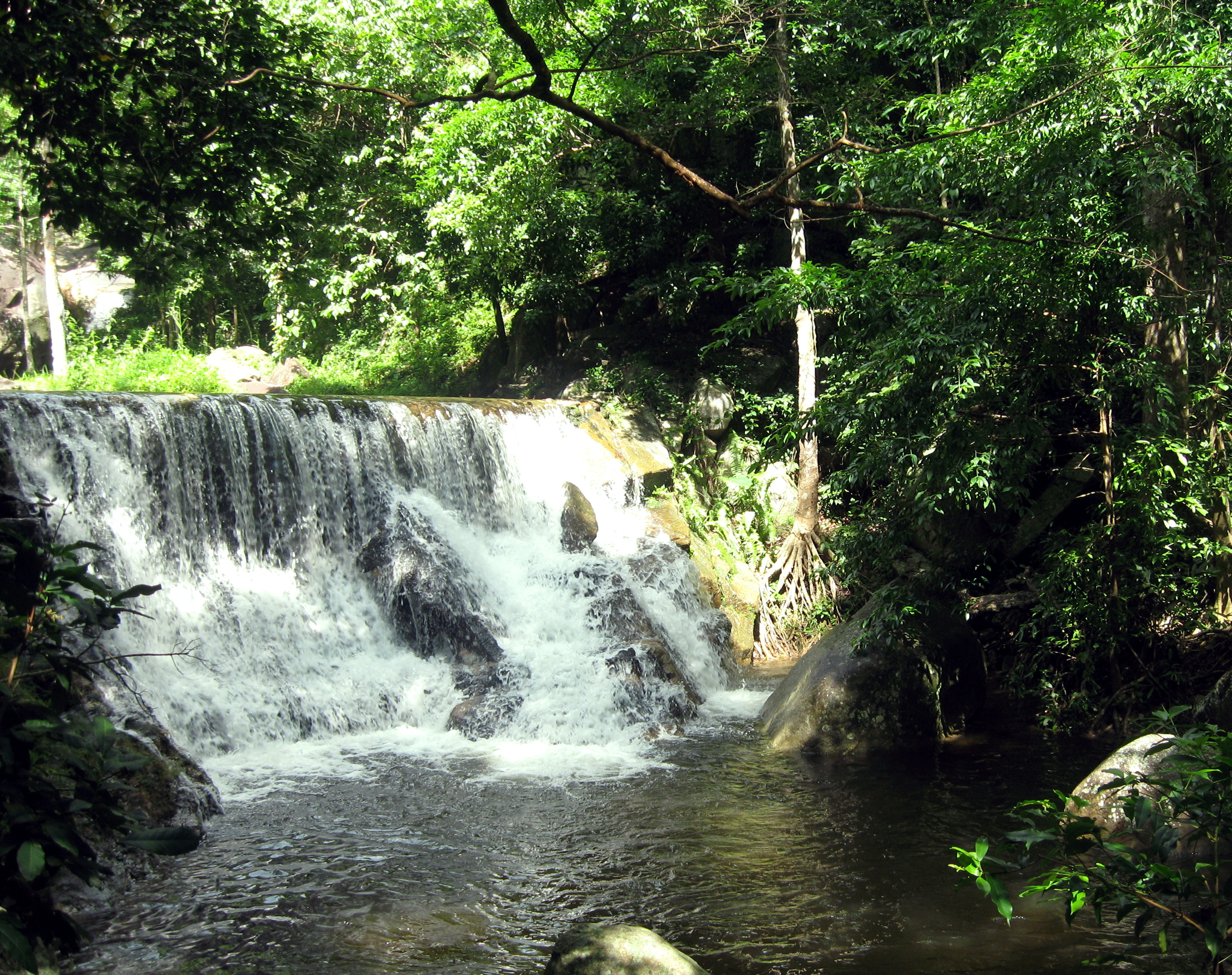
- Huai Yang waterfall
- Interactive map of Huai Yang National Park อุทยานแห่งชาติน้ำตกห้วยยาง
- Location: Huai Yang, Thap Sakae, Prachuap Khiri Khan, Thailand
- Nearest city: Thap Sakae
- Coordinates: 11°37′28.6″N 99°36′57.2″E
- Area: 161 km^{2} (62 sq mi)
- Established: December 8, 1991
- Visitors: 26,906 (in 2019)
- Governing body: Department of National Park, Wildlife and Plant Conservation (DNP)

Namtok Huai Yang National Park (Thai: อุทยานแห่งชาติน้ำตกห้วยยาง, RTGS: Utthayan Haeng Chat Namtok Huai Yang, pronounced [ʔùt.tʰā.jāːn hɛ̀ŋ tɕʰâːt nám.tòk hûaj jāːŋ]) is a national park in Thailand, consisting of several waterfalls and forests on the mountain range bordering Thailand and Myanmar.

== Overview ==
Namtok Huai Yang National Park was declared to the 70th national park in Thailand, by integrating two reserved forests Wang Duan and Huai Yang (now Hat Wanakon National Park) upgraded to Namtok Huai Yang National Park in the year 1991.

The park is montane area with elevations between 200 and 800 m (656–2,624 ft) above the sea level, an important watershed of rivers in the local area, such as Khlong Ang Thong, Khlong Kaeng, Khlong Thap Sakae, etc. It is flanked by Tenasserim Hills, the natural border between Thailand and Myanmar. The adjacent protected area is Lenya National Park of Myanmar.

It consists of hill evergreen and dry evergreen forests, as well as coniferous forest.

The park provides campsite for tourists. The restaurant and convenience store are open from 8:00 to 16:30.

== Location ==
Namtok Huai Yang National Park covers an area of 100,625 rai ~ 161 square kilometres (62 sq mi) of Thap Sakae and Bang Saphan Districts, Prachuap Khiri Khan Province, western Thailand.

The park can be reached by the Huai Yang railway station of the State Railway of Thailand (SRT), whose Southern Line runs through the area.

Travel by car, the main route is Phet Kasem Road (Highway 4), about 36 km (22 mi) from the Prachuap Khiri Khan town, and 145 km (90 mi) from Hua Hin town.

Namtok Huai Yang National Park in overview PARO 3 (Phetchaburi branch)

6) Namtok Huai Yang National Park in overview PARO 3 (Phetchaburi branch)

	National park
1	Ao Siam
2	Hat Wanakon
3	Kaeng Krachan
4	Khao Sam Roi Yot
5	Kui Buri
6	Namtok Huai Yang

	Wildlife sanctuary
7	Prince Chumphon North Park (upper)
	Non-hunting area
8	Cha-am
9	Khao Chaiyarat
10	Khao Krapuk– Khao Tao Mo

	Forest park
11	Cha-am
12	Huai Nam Sap
13	Khao Nang Phanthurat
14	Khao Ta Mong Lai
15	Klang Ao
16	Mae Ramphueng
17	Pran Buri
18	Thao Kosa

== Fauna ==
The species of wildlife that can be found here are Indochinese leopard, mainland serow, wild boar, Indian muntjac, Malayan porcupine, include a variety of leaf monkeys and gibbons.

== Sights ==
- Namtok Huai Yang: Huai Yang waterfall is a small seven-tier waterfall and the origin of the park name. Accessible by a signposted and well maintained circular trail. The trail is to first five tiers, fifth tear is 700 m (2,296 ft) from the start of the trail. The highlight is the fourth tier, which is a viewpoint that can see the scenery as far as the Gulf of Thailand.
- Namtok Khao Lan: a multi-tiered waterfall is to the south of the park office and visitor centre. This waterfall is worth a visit during the rainy season.
- Namtok Kha On: also known as Thap Mon, a nine-tier cascading waterfall 44 km (27 mi) south from the main visitor centre in Bang Saphan side.
- Khao Luang: Khao Luang Mountain is a summit of the park, it is accessible for visitors only in guidance with rangers. It takes nearly 5 hours to reach the peak, an overnight stay at the summit is required. Khao Luang is also a habitat for many kinds of wildlife including Phricotelphusa sirindhorn an endemic freshwater crab.

== See also ==
- List of national parks of Thailand
- DNP - Namtok Huai Yang National Park
- List of Protected Areas Regional Offices of Thailand
