= Kui Buri National Park =

Protected area in Thailand

- IUCN category II (national park)
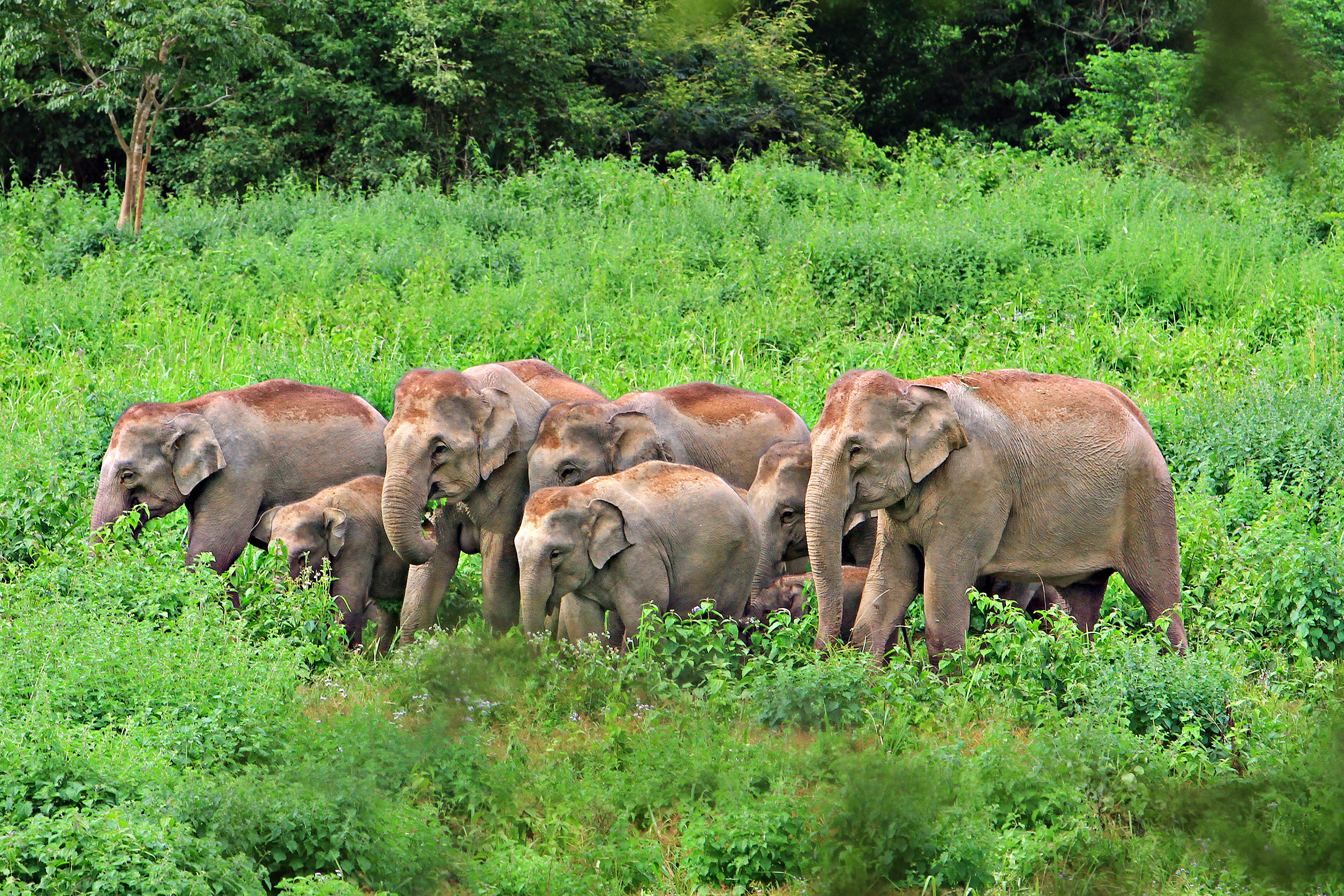

- Location within Thailand
- Location: Prachuap Khiri Khan Province, Thailand
- Nearest city: Pranburi
- Coordinates: 12°3′6″N 99°33′26″E
- Area: 969 km^{2} (374 sq mi)
- Established: 1999
- Visitors: 20,746 (in 2019)
- Governing body: Department of National Parks, Wildlife and Plant Conservation

UNESCO World Heritage Site
- Type: Natural
- Criteria: X
- Designated: 2021
- Part of: Kaeng Krachan Forest Complex
- Reference no.: 1461
- Region: Asia-Pacific

Kui Buri National Park is a national park of Thailand in the Tenasserim Hills in Prachuap Khiri Khan Province. It was established as the 90th national park in March 1999.

== Geography ==
The park, with an area of 605,625 rai ~ 969 square kilometres (374 sq mi) covers parts of the Pran Buri, Sam Roi Yot, and Mueang Prachuap Khiri Khan Districts of Prachuap Khiri Khan Province.

== Flora ==
The forests contain dry evergreen and moist evergreen forests. Important trees are Dipterocarpus tuberculatus, Hopea odorata, Terminalia chebula, and different species of palms.

The park has more than 200,000 sandalwood trees. It is the only place in Thailand where sandalwood can be harvested for the cremation of royal family members. Nine trees were cut down for the cremation of King Bhumibol Adulyadej. A royal brahmin spent one month selecting trees meeting royal criteria: they must be dead and have been over 100 years old.

== Fauna ==
Some animals that can be found in the park:

- Asian elephants
- Gaur
- Malayan tapir
- Wild pig
- Leopard
- Tiger
- Serow
- Gibbons
- Macaque
- Langur
- Sambar deer
- Asiatic black bear
- Barking deer
- Fea's muntjac
- Banteng
- Lesser mouse deer

== Location ==
Kui Buri National Park in overview PARO 3 (Phetchaburi branch)

5) Kui Buri National Park in overview PARO 3 (Phetchaburi branch)

	National park
1	Ao Siam
2	Hat Wanakon
3	Kaeng Krachan
4	Khao Sam Roi Yot
5	Kui Buri
6	Namtok Huai Yang

	Wildlife sanctuary
7	Prince Chumphon North Park (upper)
	Non-hunting area
8	Cha-am
9	Khao Chaiyarat
10	Khao Krapuk– Khao Tao Mo

	Forest park
11	Cha-am
12	Huai Nam Sap
13	Khao Nang Phanthurat
14	Khao Ta Mong Lai
15	Klang Ao
16	Mae Ramphueng
17	Pran Buri
18	Thao Kosa

== See also ==
- List of national parks of Thailand
- DNP - Kui Buri National Park
- List of Protected Areas Regional Offices of Thailand
