= Khao Sam Roi Yot National Park =

National marine park in Thailand

- IUCN category II (national park)
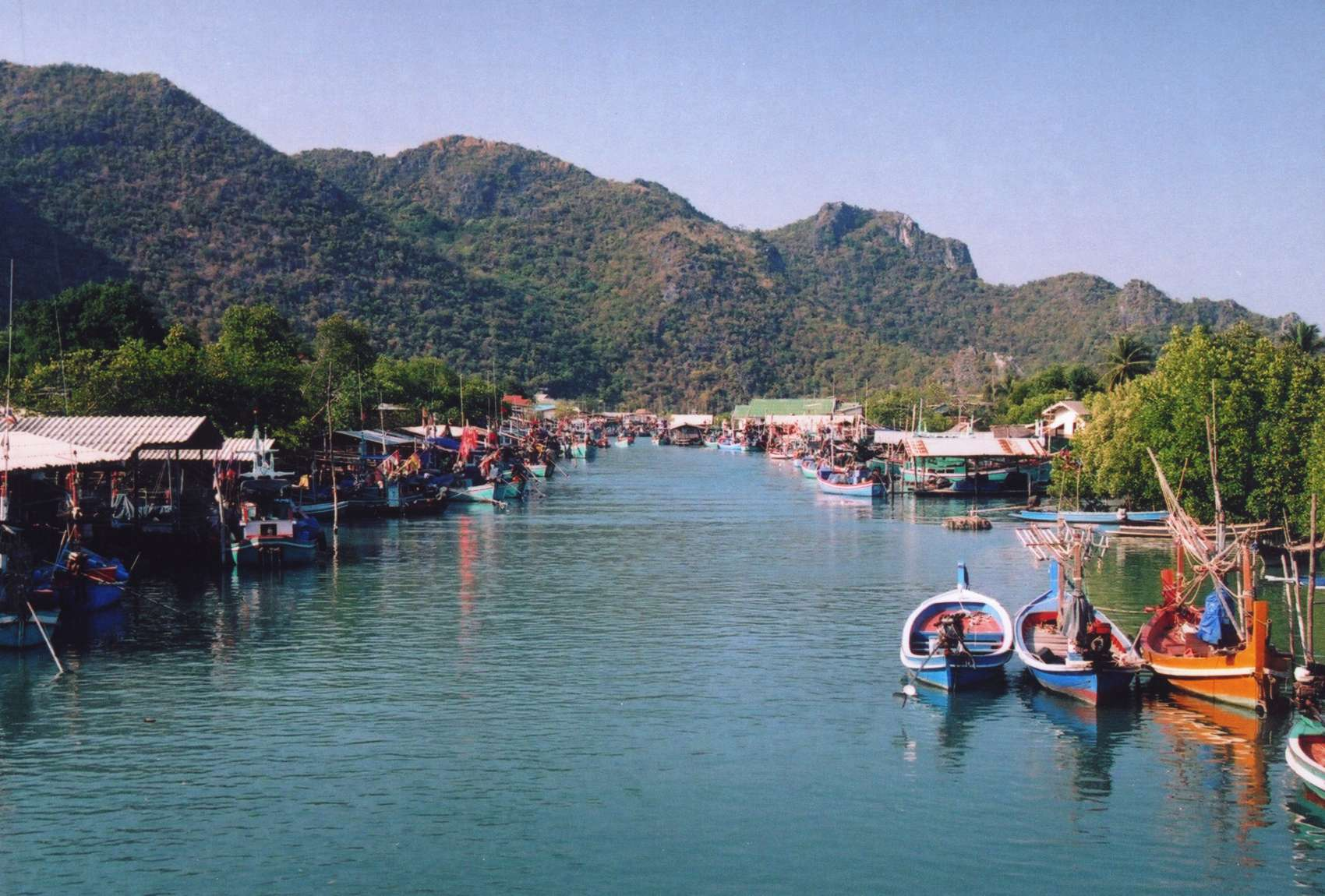
- Harbor, Bang Pu

- Location within Thailand
- Location: Prachuap Khiri Khan Province, Thailand
- Nearest city: Pranburi
- Coordinates: 12°10′57″N 99°56′54″E
- Area: 98 km^{2} (38 sq mi)
- Established: 1966
- Visitors: 164,735 (in 2019)
- Governing body: Department of National Parks, Wildlife and Plant Conservation

Ramsar Wetland
- Official name: Khao Sam Roi Yot Wetland
- Designated: 8 January 2008
- Reference no.: 2238

Khao Sam Roi Yot National Park (Thai: อุทยานแห่งชาติเขาสามร้อยยอด, RTGS: Utthayan Haeng Chat Khao Sam Roi Yot, pronounced [ʔùt.tʰā.jāːn hɛ̀ŋ tɕʰâːt kʰǎw sǎːm rɔ́ːj jɔ̂ːt]) is a marine national park in Kui Buri District, Prachuap Khiri Khan Province, Thailand. It covers 61,300 rai ~ 98 square kilometres (38 sq mi) of which 13,050 rai ~ 21 square kilometres (8.1 sq mi) are marine areas. The park was established in 1966, and was the first coastal national park of Thailand. The park includes Thailand's largest freshwater marsh.

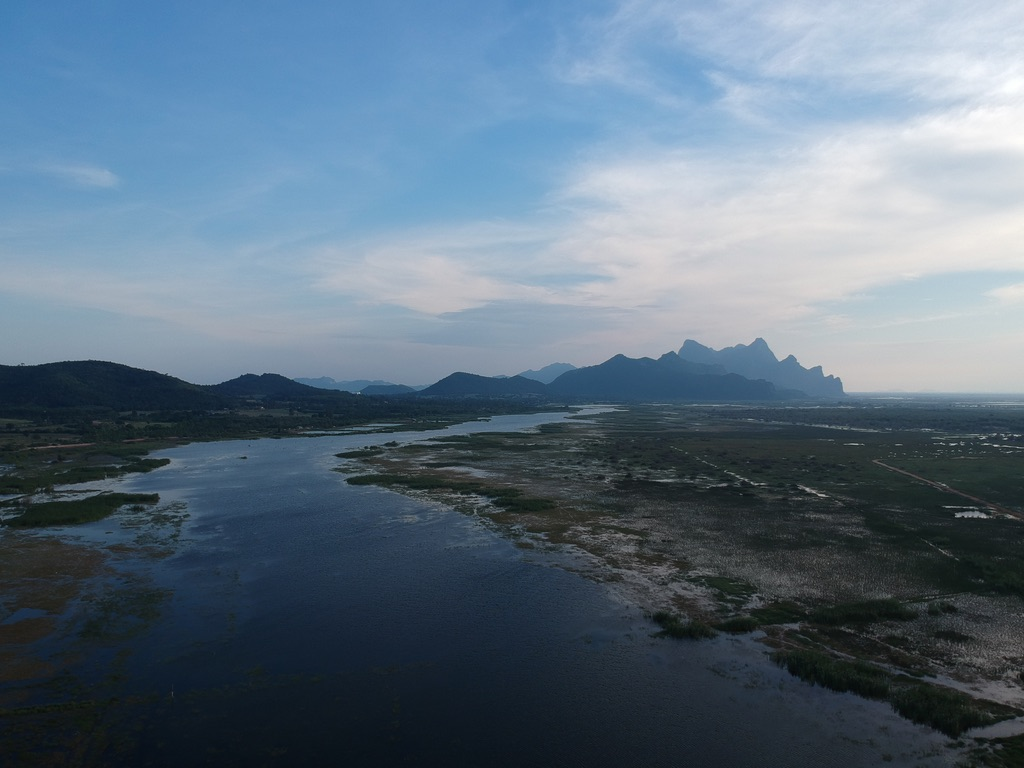
looking south at sam roi yot

== Geography ==
The limestone hills are a sub-range of the Tenasserim Hills that arise at the shore of the Gulf of Thailand, with the highest elevation being Khao Krachom at 605 meters (1,985 ft). Between the hills are freshwater marshes. Several of these marshes were converted into shrimp farms, as only 22,000 rai ~ 35 square kilometres (14 sq mi) of the total 43,000 rai ~ 69 square kilometres (27 sq mi) of marshes are part of the national park. A portion, 11,000 rai ~ 18 square kilometres (6.9 sq mi), of these marshes are scheduled to be declared a Ramsar site.

Two white sand beaches are in the park, Hat Laem Sala and Hat Sam Phraya. Hat Laem Sala is 17 km from park headquarters and can be reached from the village Ban Pu either by boat or by climbing up and down over a hill for nearly 30 minutes. Five uninhabited islands lie just offshore.

The park is approximately 58 kilometers (36 mi) south of Hua Hin.

The origin of the name "Khao Sam Roi Yot" is undetermined. Local lore has it that it means 'mountain with 300 peaks', or the range had been an island where 300 survivors from a sinking Chinese junk sought refuge, or the range was named after a local plant called sam roi yot.

=== Phraya Nakhon Cave ===
Phraya Nakhon Cave (ถ้ำพระยานคร) is about 500 meters (1,600 ft) from Laem Sala Beach, approximately 17 kilometers (11 mi) north of park headquarters. Visitors can go to the cave by renting a boat or by walking across Tian Mountain. After that, there is a climb up the mountain about 430 meters (1,410 ft) to reach Phraya Nakhon Cave. Its most famous early visitor was King Chulalongkorn.

There is a water well at the foot of the mountain known as Phraya Nakhon Well. It is made of baked clay bricks in a trapezoidal shape.

Phraya Nakhon is a large cave which has a hole in the ceiling allowing sunlight to penetrate. At the top of the hole, there is a stone bridge known as "death bridge" because many wild animals have fallen to their deaths from it.

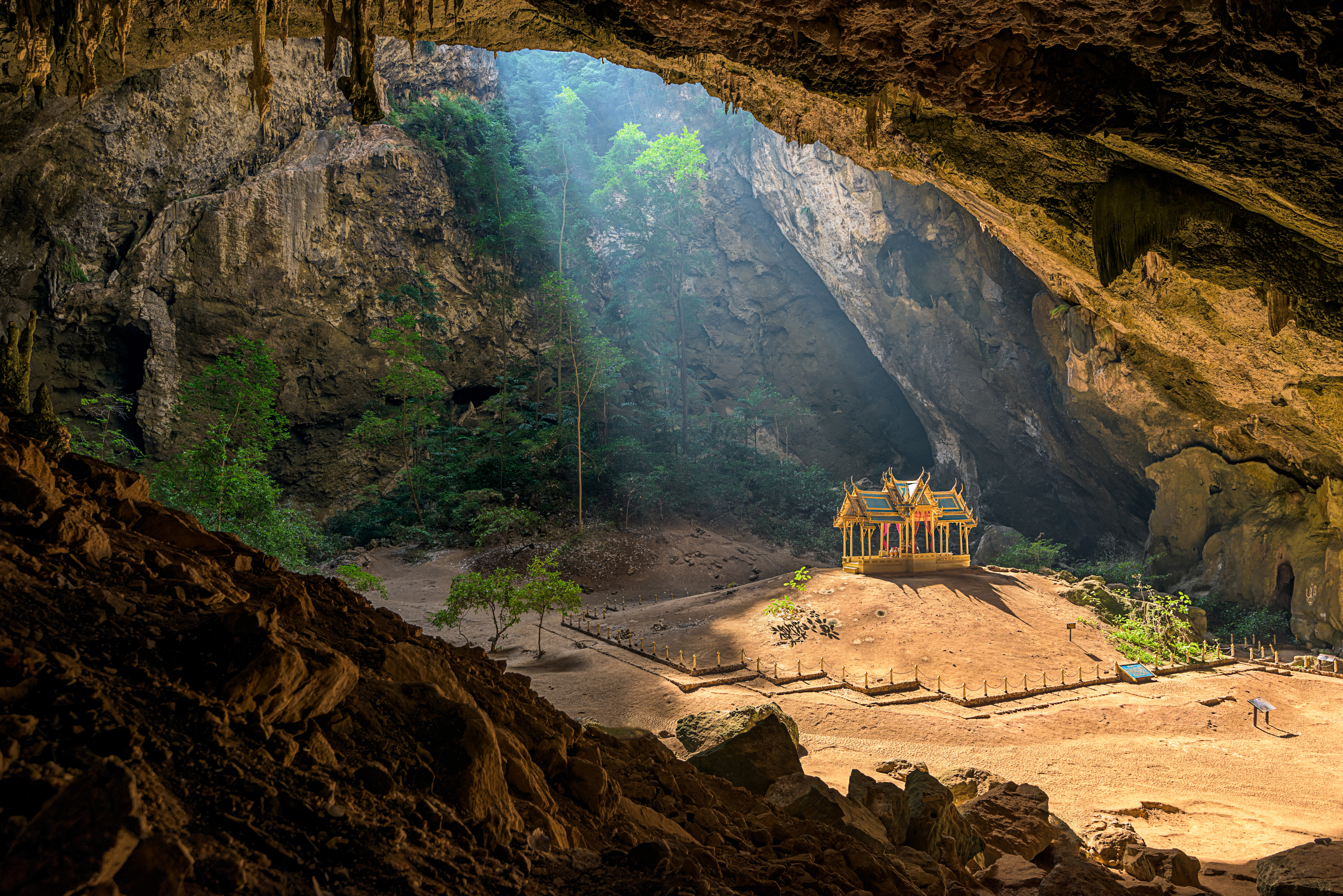
Khuha Kharuehat pavilion, Phraya Nakhon Cave

Khuha Kharuehat Pavilion (พระที่นั่งคูหาคฤหาสน์) is a historic site built for King Chulalongkorn's visit to the region in 1890. At certain times during certain months, the sun will shine directly on it. The pavilion has since become the symbol of the Prachuap Khiri Khan Province. Later kings also visited the cave, including King Vajiravudh and King Bhumibol Adulyadej.

=== Klong Khao Daeng ===
Klong Khao Daeng is a 4-kilometer-long (2.5 mi) stream running deep into mangrove forests at one end and at its mouth freshwater and seawater collide. The mangroves consist of the samae thalay (grey mangrove), kongkang bai lek (true mangrove), kongkang bai yai (red mangrove), and chakhram (herbaceous seepweed).

== Climate ==
The temperature in winter (between October - February) ranges from 18˚C to 25˚C.

The temperature in summer (between March - May) ranges from 23˚C to 32˚C.

The temperature in the monsoon season (between June - September) ranges from 20˚C to 30˚C.

== Fauna ==
The park is home to a variety of birds, including the common kingfisher, the black-capped kingfisher, the collared kingfisher, the little heron, the little egret, and the Javan pond-heron. Wildlife found in the mangroves includes pla teen (mudskippers), pu kam dab (fiddler crabs), ling samae (the crab-eating macaque), collared kingfisher (nok kin pieo), snapping shrimp (kung deed khan), mud creeper (hoi khika), and oysters (hoi nangrom). Rare animals in the park include the mainland serow (Nemorhaedus sumatraensis), dusky langurs (Trachypithecus obscurus), fishing cats (Prionailurus viverrinus) (Thai: เสือปลา; RTGS: suea pla), as well as many bird species. At sea, Irrawaddy dolphins (Orcaella brevirostris) are sometimes seen.

== History ==
Khao Sam Roi Yot was probably where King Mongkut hosted European guests on 18 August 1868 to observe a total solar eclipse. The king was interested in astronomy and had calculated the date and location of the eclipse himself. His calculations proved better—by about two seconds—than those of French astronomers, who acknowledged his accuracy. He contracted malaria, possibly during that event, and died on 1 October.

The national park was created on 28 June 1966, with an original area of 38,300 rai ~ 61 square kilometres (24 sq mi). It was enlarged with 23,000 rai ~ 37 square kilometres (14 sq mi) on 1 April 1982.

=== Archaeology ===
The discovery of 3,000 years old cave paintings was announced by archaeologists from the Fine Arts Office in May in 2020. Some of the depicted pictures are still visible and clear, while some paintings were damaged by limestone etching. According to archeologist Kannika Premjai, paintings describe humanlike figures with accessories on their bodies, hunting scenes with bow and arrow. Moreover, there is also an animal figure seems to be serow (a goat-like mammal found regionally) found among the drawings. In October 2020, more rock art was discovered in unmapped caves in Sam Roi Yot National Park, dating back to between 2,000 and 3,000 years ago.

== Location ==
Khao Sam Roi Yot National Park in overview PARO 3 (Phetchaburi branch)

4) Khao Sam Roi Yot National Park in overview PARO 3 (Phetchaburi branch)

	National park
1	Ao Siam
2	Hat Wanakon
3	Kaeng Krachan
4	Khao Sam Roi Yot
5	Kui Buri
6	Namtok Huai Yang

	Wildlife sanctuary
7	Prince Chumphon North Park (upper)
	Non-hunting area
8	Cha-am
9	Khao Chaiyarat
10	Khao Krapuk– Khao Tao Mo

	Forest park
11	Cha-am
12	Huai Nam Sap
13	Khao Nang Phanthurat
14	Khao Ta Mong Lai
15	Klang Ao
16	Mae Ramphueng
17	Pran Buri
18	Thao Kosa

== See also ==
- List of national parks of Thailand
- DNP - Khao Sam Roi Yot National Park
- List of Protected Areas Regional Offices of Thailand
