= Hat Wanakon National Park =

National park in Thailand

- IUCN category II (national park)
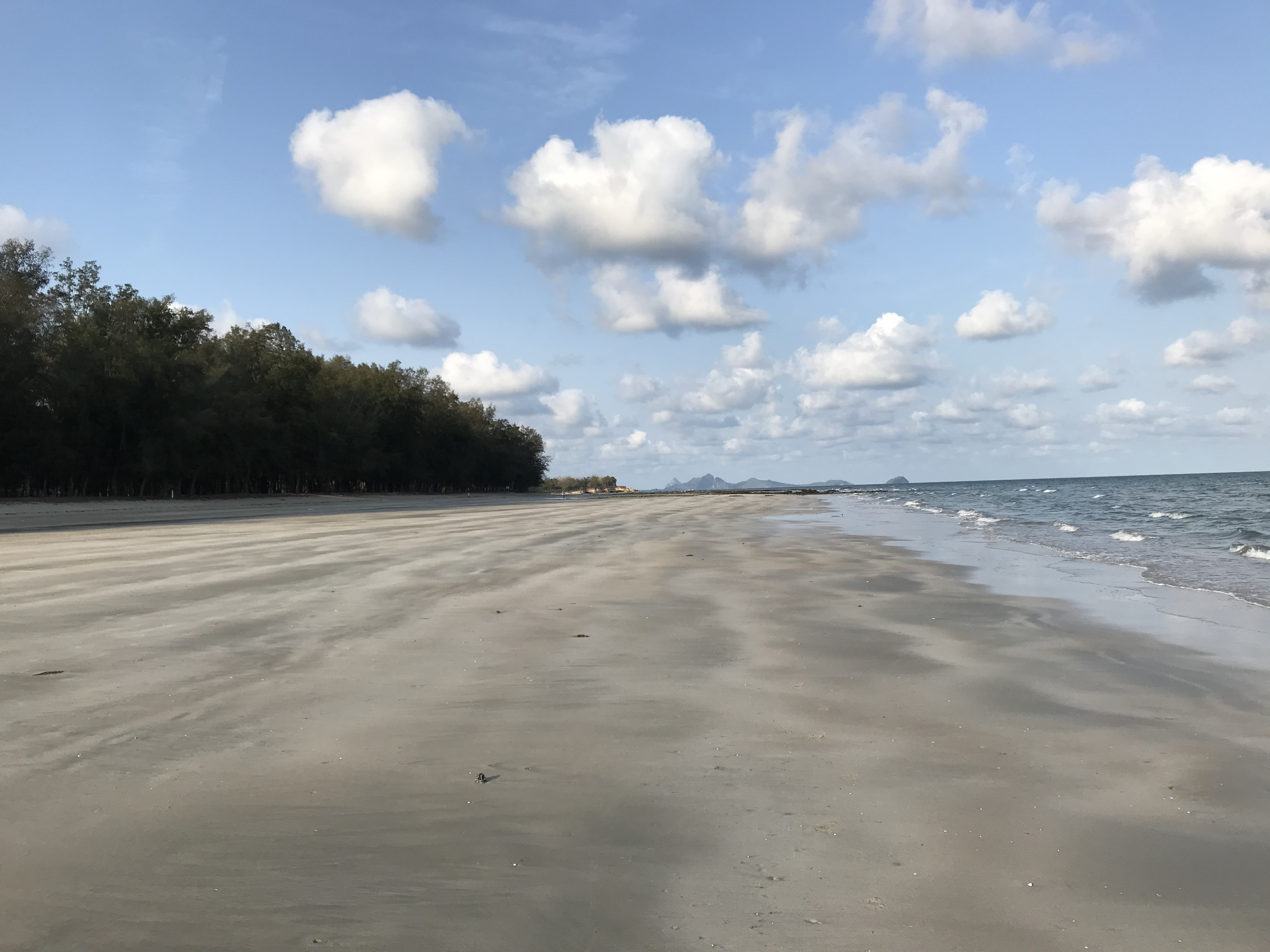
- Wanakon Beach
- Interactive map of Hat Wanakon National Park
- Location: Huai Yang, Thap Sakae and Huai Sai, Mueang Prachuap Khiri Khan, Prachuap Khiri Khan Province
- Nearest town: Thap Sakae, Prachuap Khiri Khan
- Coordinates: 11°35′55″N 99°40′34″E
- Area: 38 km^{2} (15 sq mi)
- Established: December 30, 1992; 33 years ago
- Visitors: 43,268 (in 2019)
- Governing body: Department of National Parks, Wildlife and Plant Conservation

Hat Wanakon National Park (Thai: อุทยานแห่งชาติหาดวนกร) is a sand beach and marine national park in Prachuap Khiri Khan Province, western Thailand. It overlaps two districts of Prachuap Khiri Khan: Mueang Prachuap Khriri Khan and Thap Sakae, with an area of 23,750 rai ~ 38 square kilometres (15 sq mi). The beach is on Petchkasem Road (Highway 4) about 23 km (14 mi) from Prachuap Khiri Khan town towards Thap Sakae, about 300 km (186 mi) from Bangkok.

== History and geography ==
This area was originally a forest park. Later it was upgraded to a national park in 1992, the 76th national park and the 18th marine national park in Thailand. The landscape here is sparse wooded with various species such as Indian thorny bamboo, Burmese rosewood, crape myrtle, Queen's flower and teak.

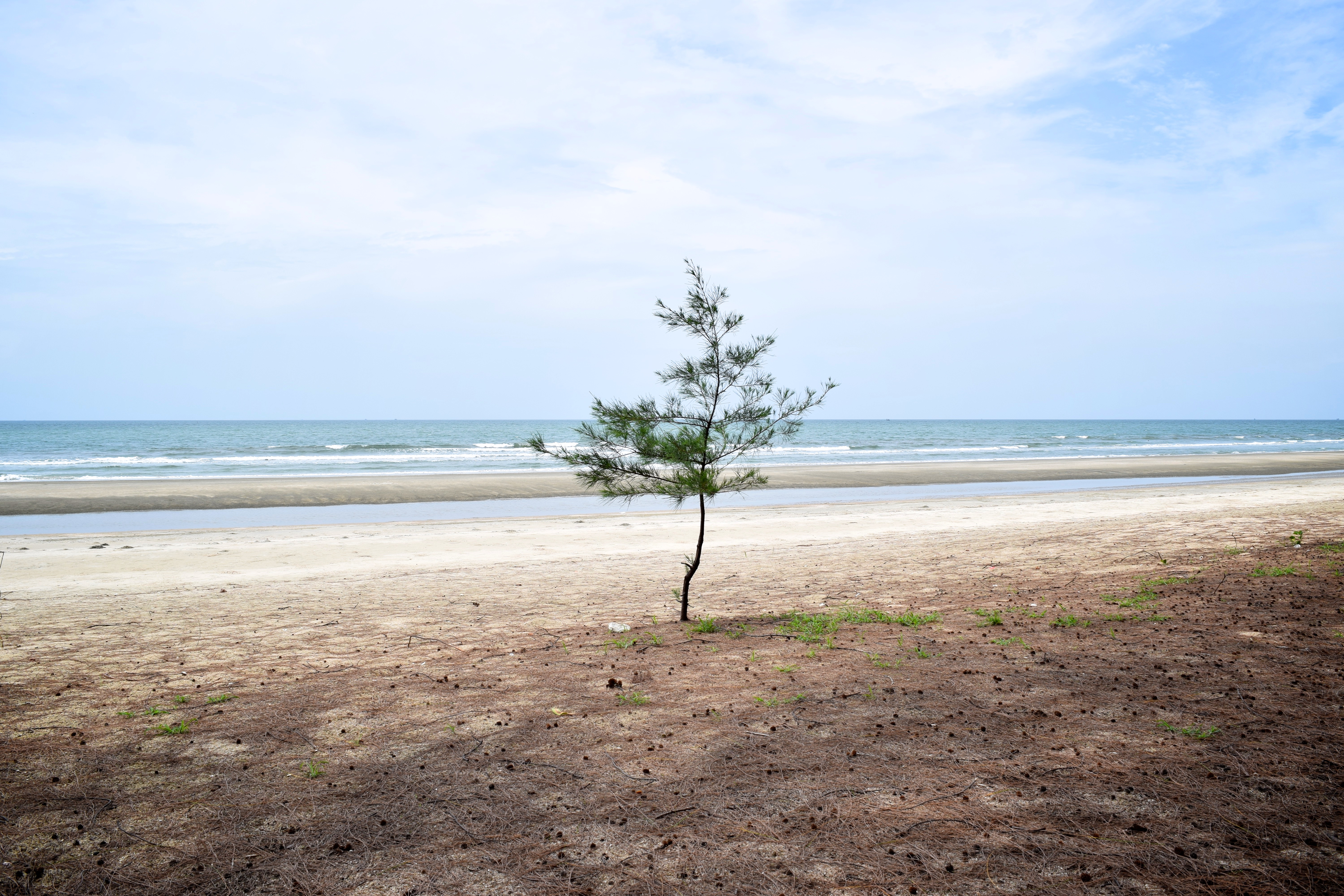
Lone tree at the beach

The twin islands, Ko Chan (เกาะจาน) and Ko Tai-si (เกาะท้ายทรีย์), are about seven kilometres (four miles) offshore. Surrounding them is the most abundant coral reef in the Gulf of Thailand. It contains many species of corals, soft corals and other aquatic creatures for a distance of approximately two kilometres (one mile) and a depth of approximately 8–10 m (26.25-32.8 ft). The rare species Acropora cytherea can be found here. Fishing boats are not allowed to enter the area.

== Location ==
Hat Wanakon National Park in overview PARO 3 (Phetchaburi branch)

2) Hat Wanakon National Park in overview PARO 3 (Phetchaburi branch)

	National park
1	Ao Siam
2	Hat Wanakon
3	Kaeng Krachan
4	Khao Sam Roi Yot
5	Kui Buri
6	Namtok Huai Yang

	Wildlife sanctuary
7	Prince Chumphon North Park (upper)
	Non-hunting area
8	Cha-am
9	Khao Chaiyarat
10	Khao Krapuk– Khao Tao Mo

	Forest park
11	Cha-am
12	Huai Nam Sap
13	Khao Nang Phanthurat
14	Khao Ta Mong Lai
15	Klang Ao
16	Mae Ramphueng
17	Pran Buri
18	Thao Kosa

== See also ==
- List of national parks in Thailand
- DNP - Hat Wanakon National Park
- List of islands of Thailand
- List of Protected Areas Regional Offices of Thailand
