= Bang Saphan district =

Bang Saphan บางสะพาน
- District
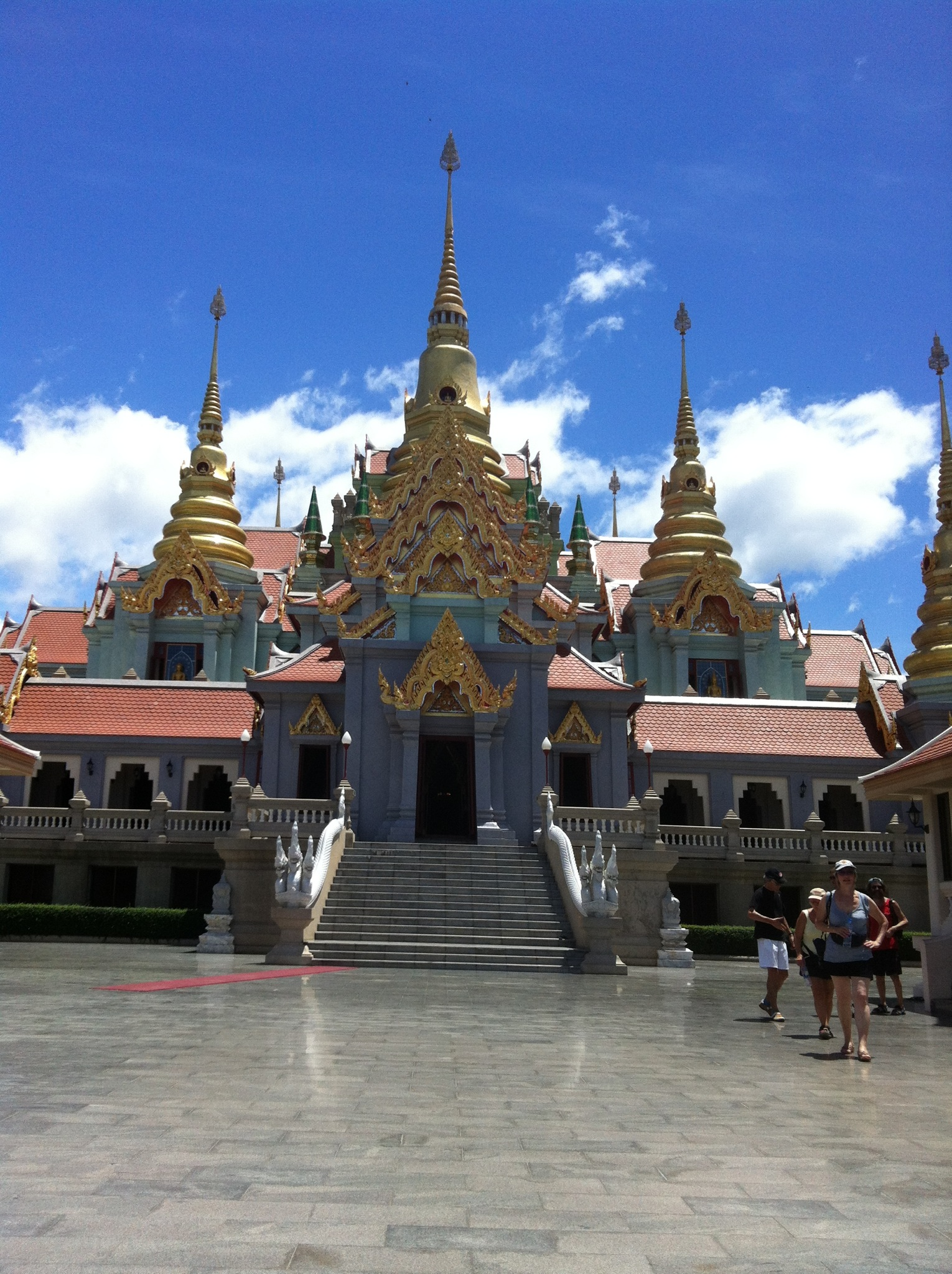
- Phra Mahathat Chedi Phakdee Prakat

- District location in Prachuap Khiri Khan province
- Coordinates: 11°12′51″N 99°30′43″E
- Country: Thailand
- Province: Prachuap Khiri Khan

Area
  - Total: 868.0 km^{2} (335.1 sq mi)

Population (January 2025)
  - Total: 75,965
  - Density: 87.52/km^{2} (226.7/sq mi)
- Time zone: UTC+7 (ICT)
- Postal code: 77140
- Geocode: 7704

Bang Saphan (Thai: บางสะพาน, pronounced [bāːŋ sā.pʰāːn]) is a district (amphoe) in the southern part of Prachuap Khiri Khan province, central Thailand.

== History ==
Bang Saphan dates back to the Ayutthaya Kingdom. In the Thonburi Kingdom, it was named Mueang Kamnoed Nopphakhun. King Nangklao (Rama III) of Rattanakosin established Kamnoed Nopphakhun as a fourth-class city under the Kalahom (defence ministry). King Chulalongkorn (Rama V) downgraded the city to Mueang Kamnoed Nopphakhun District. In 1915 King Vajiravudh (Rama VI) renamed the district by removing the word Mueang off. Later the king changed the name to Bang Saphan.

== Geography ==
Bang Saphan's neighboring districts are Thap Sakae to the north and Bang Saphan Noi to the south. To the west are the Tenasserim Hills and the Tanintharyi Division of Myanmar, to the east the Gulf of Thailand.

== Administration ==
The district is divided into seven sub-districts (tambons), which are further subdivided into 71 villages (mubans). There are three townships (thesaban tambon) areas: Kamnoet Nopphakhun covers parts of tambon Kamnoet Nopphakhun, Ronthong covers parts of tambon Ronthong, and Ban Krut covers parts of tambon Thongchai. There are a further seven tambon administrative organizations (TAO) responsible for the non-municipal areas.

No.	Name	Thai name	Villages
1.	Kamnoet Nopphakhun	กำเนิดนพคุณ	8
2.	Phong Prasat	พงศ์ประศาสน์	11
3.	Ron Thong	ร่อนทอง	12
4.	Thong Chai	ธงชัย	11
5.	Chai Kasem	ชัยเกษม	12
6.	Thong Mongkhon	ทองมงคล	10
7.	Mae Ramphueng	แม่รำพึง	7

== Economy ==
Locals still work at gold panning in Klong Thong, a natural stream at Ban Pa Ron in Tambon Ron Thong, and a nearby creek, Huai Janghan. It is claimed that they can make more from panning gold than from farming.

Ban Huai Kriab is known for black-and-white rattan basketry. Its Ban Huai Kriab Rattan Weaving Group numbers 38 persons who fashion rattan utensils and operate nine shops.

== Gallery ==
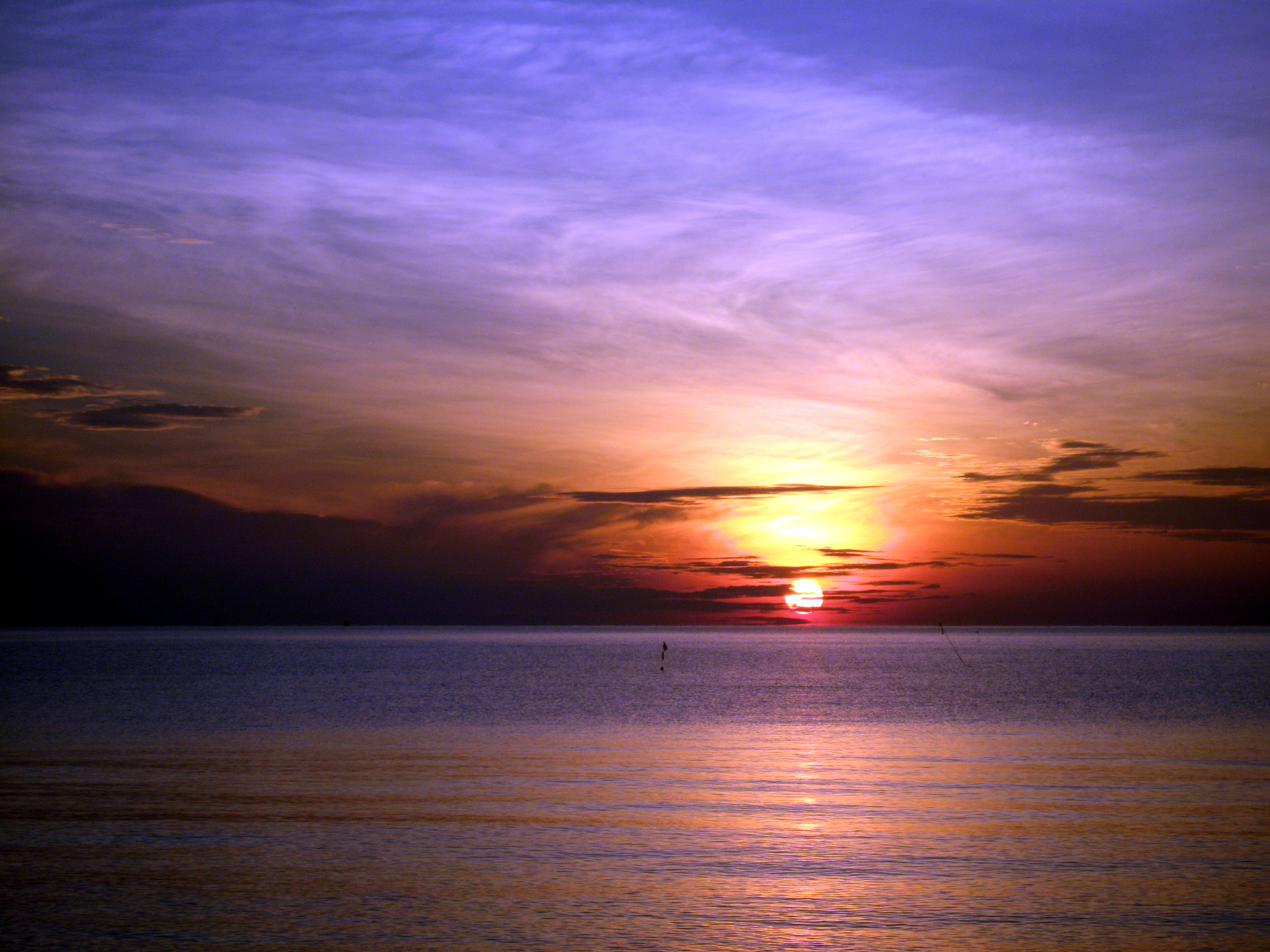
Ban Krut Beach, Tambon Thong Chai

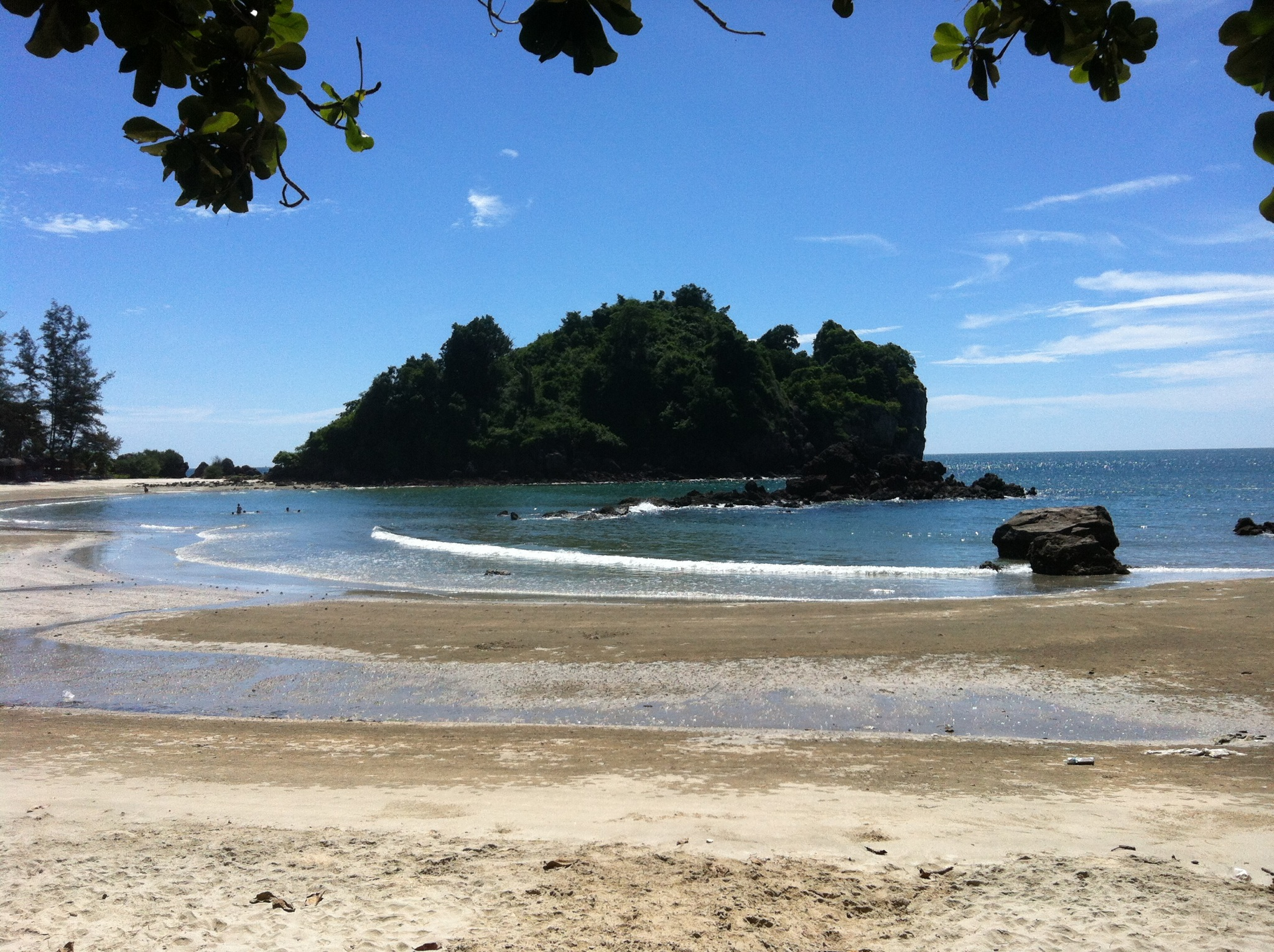
Bo Tong Lang beach, Tambon Mae Ramphueng

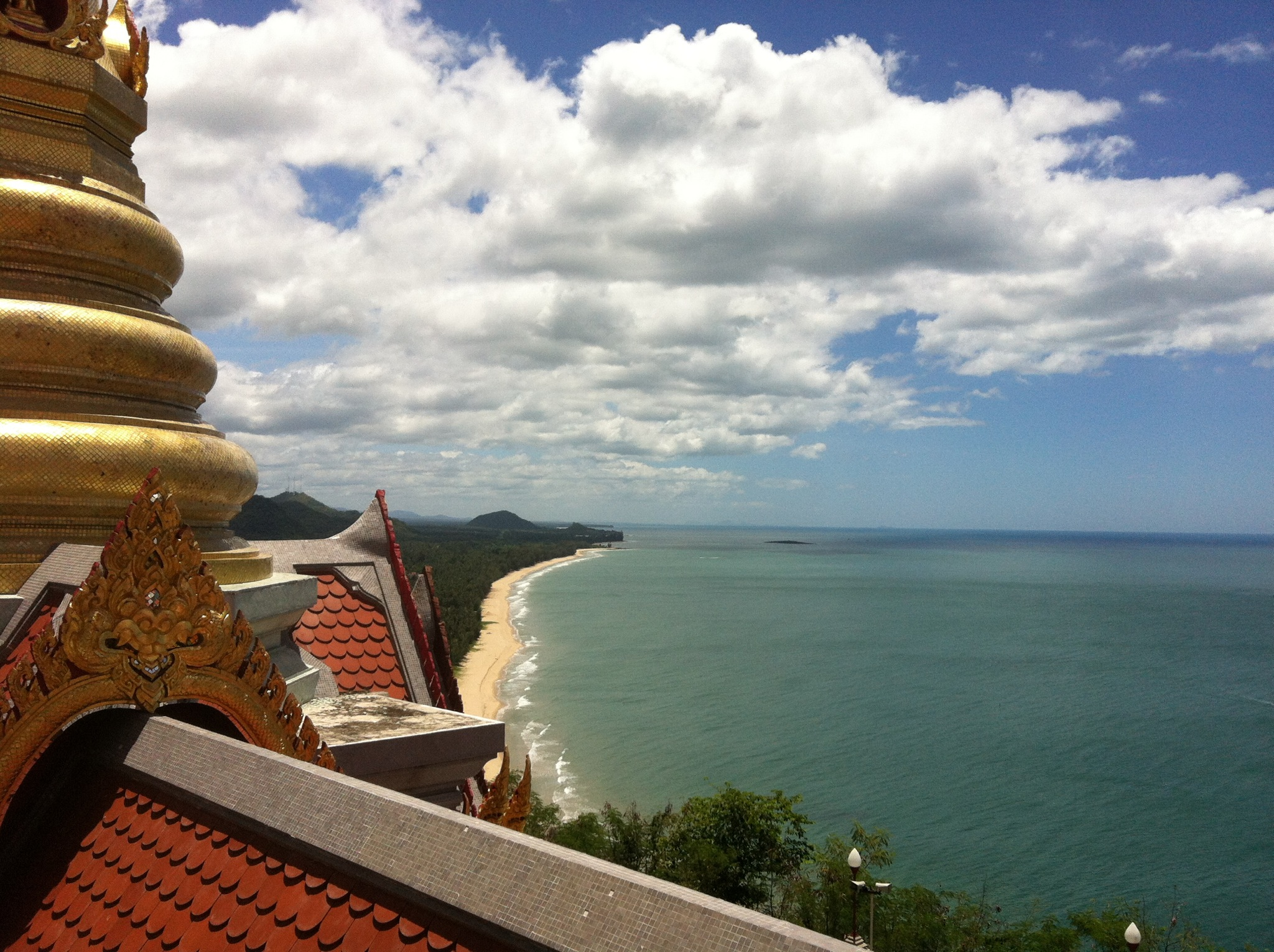
View from Phra Mahathat Chedi Phakdee Prakat, Tambon Thong Chai

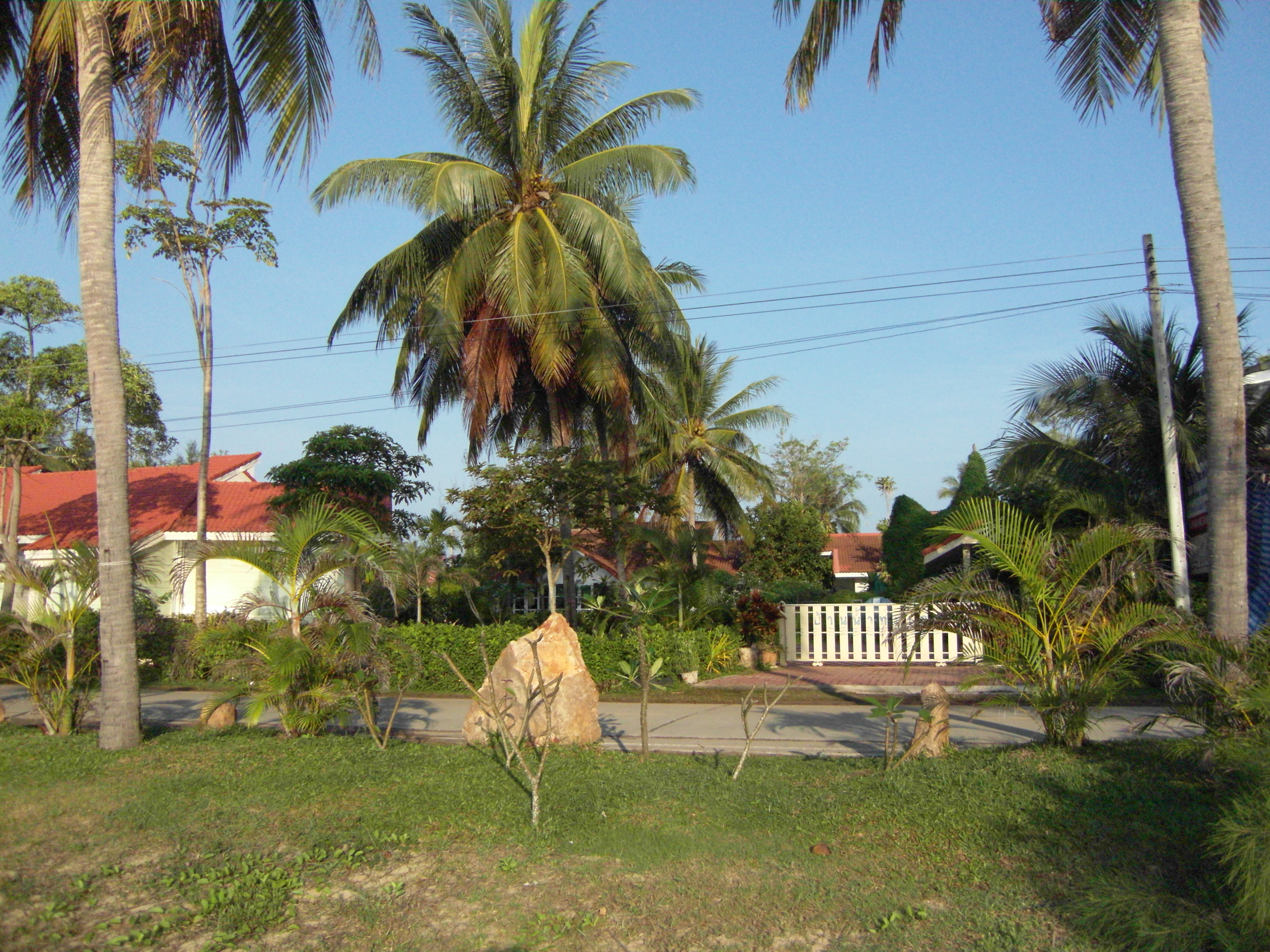
Ban Krut, Tambon Thong Chai

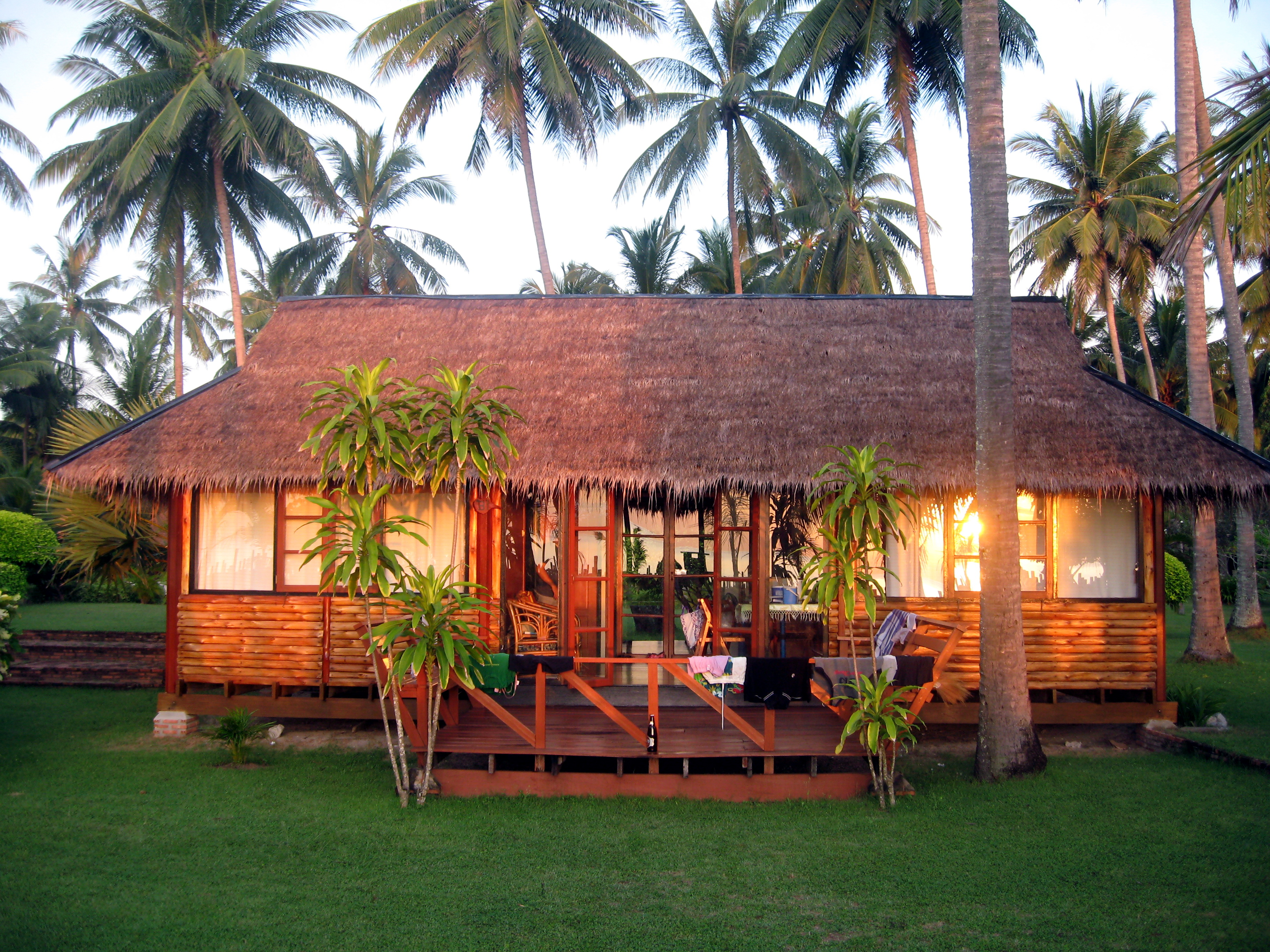
Bungalow, Bang Krut Beach
