= Prachuap Khiri Khan province =

Coordinates: 11°48′N 99°47′E

Prachuap Khiri Khan ประจวบคีรีขันธ์
- Province
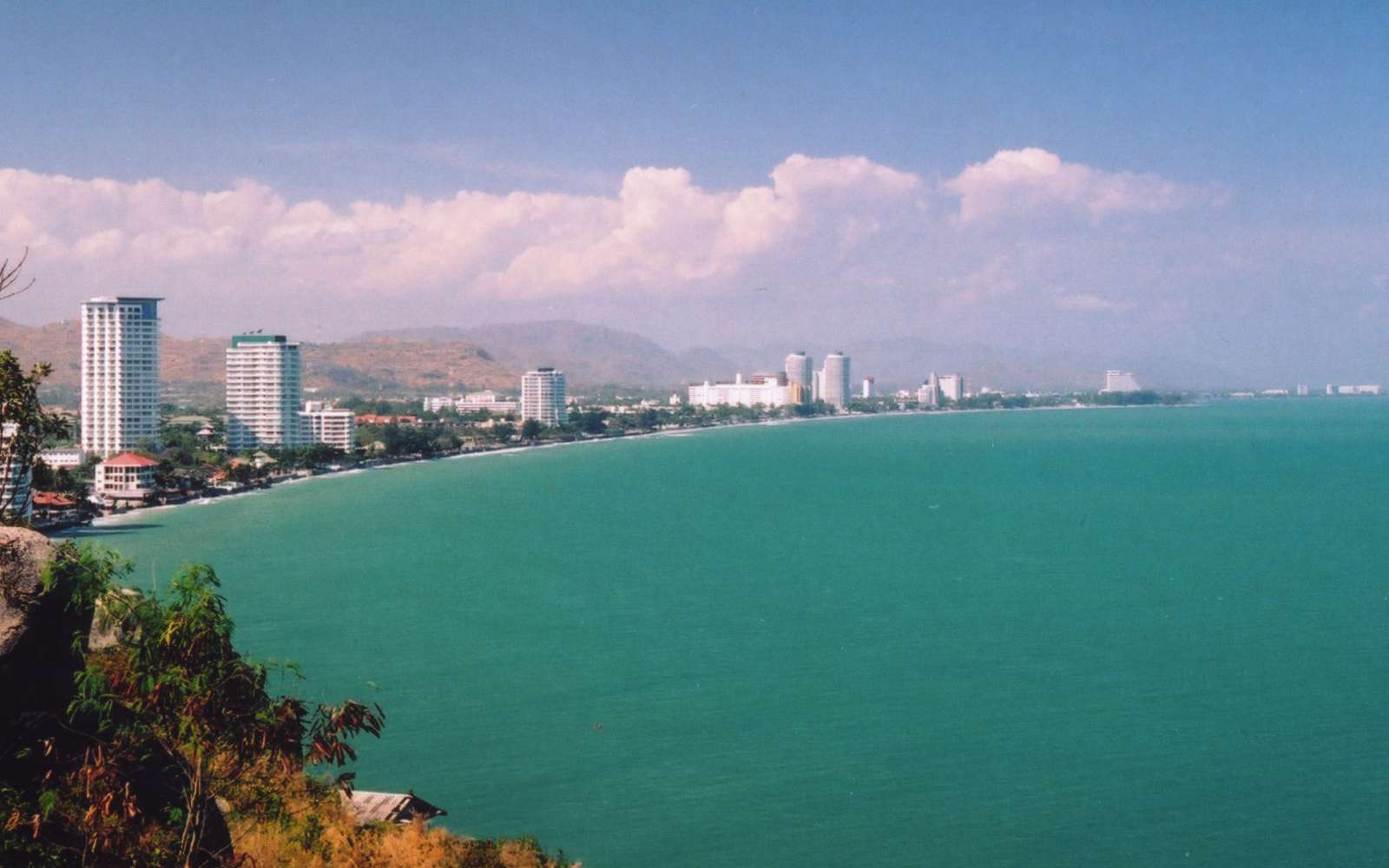
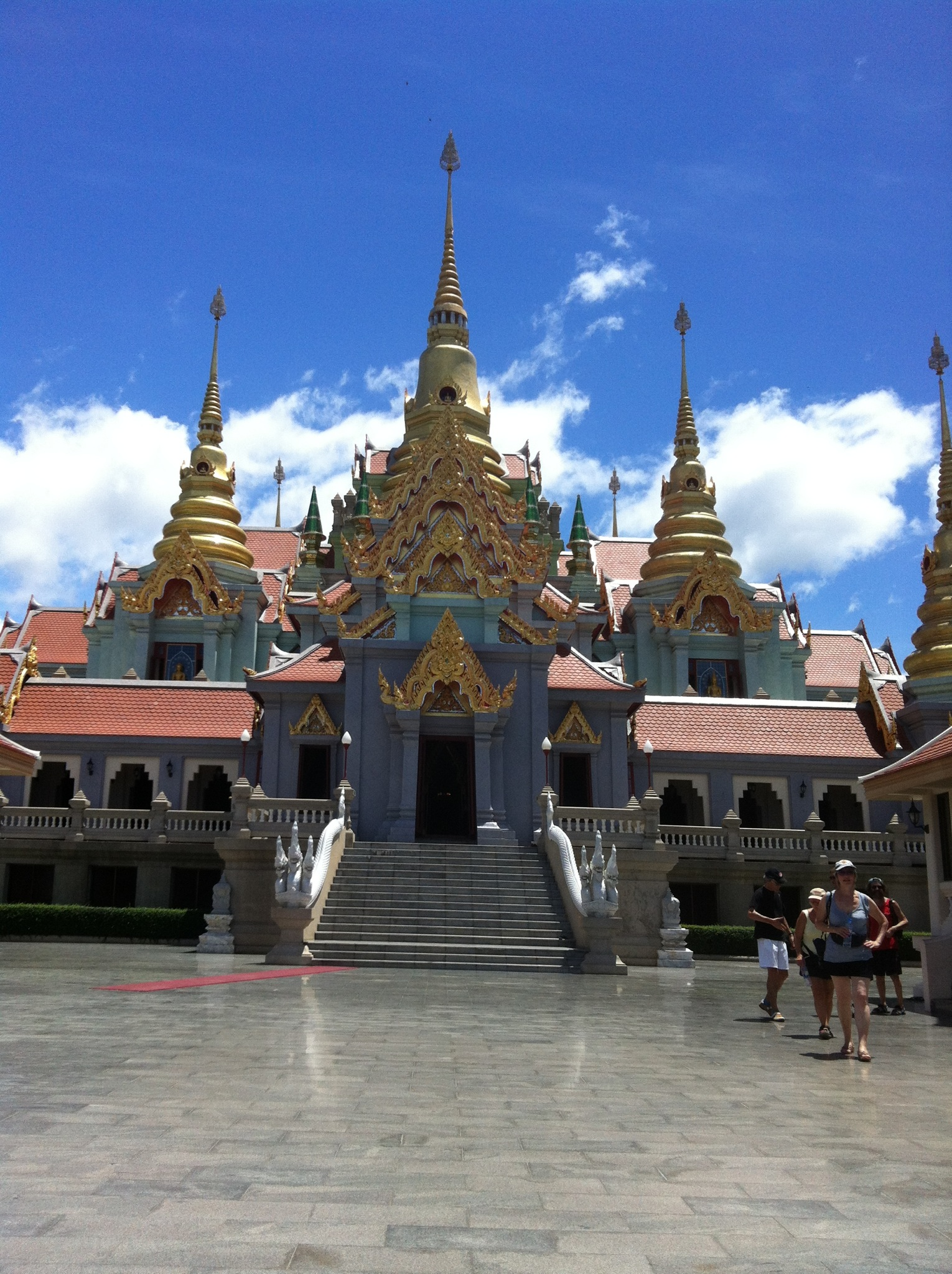
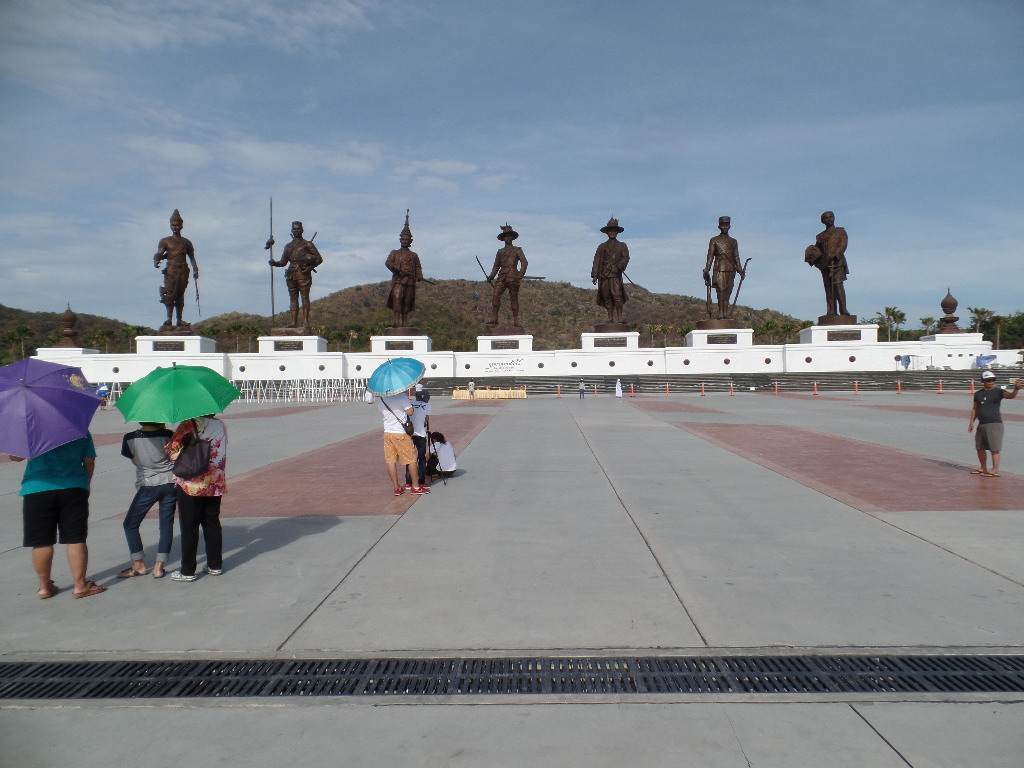
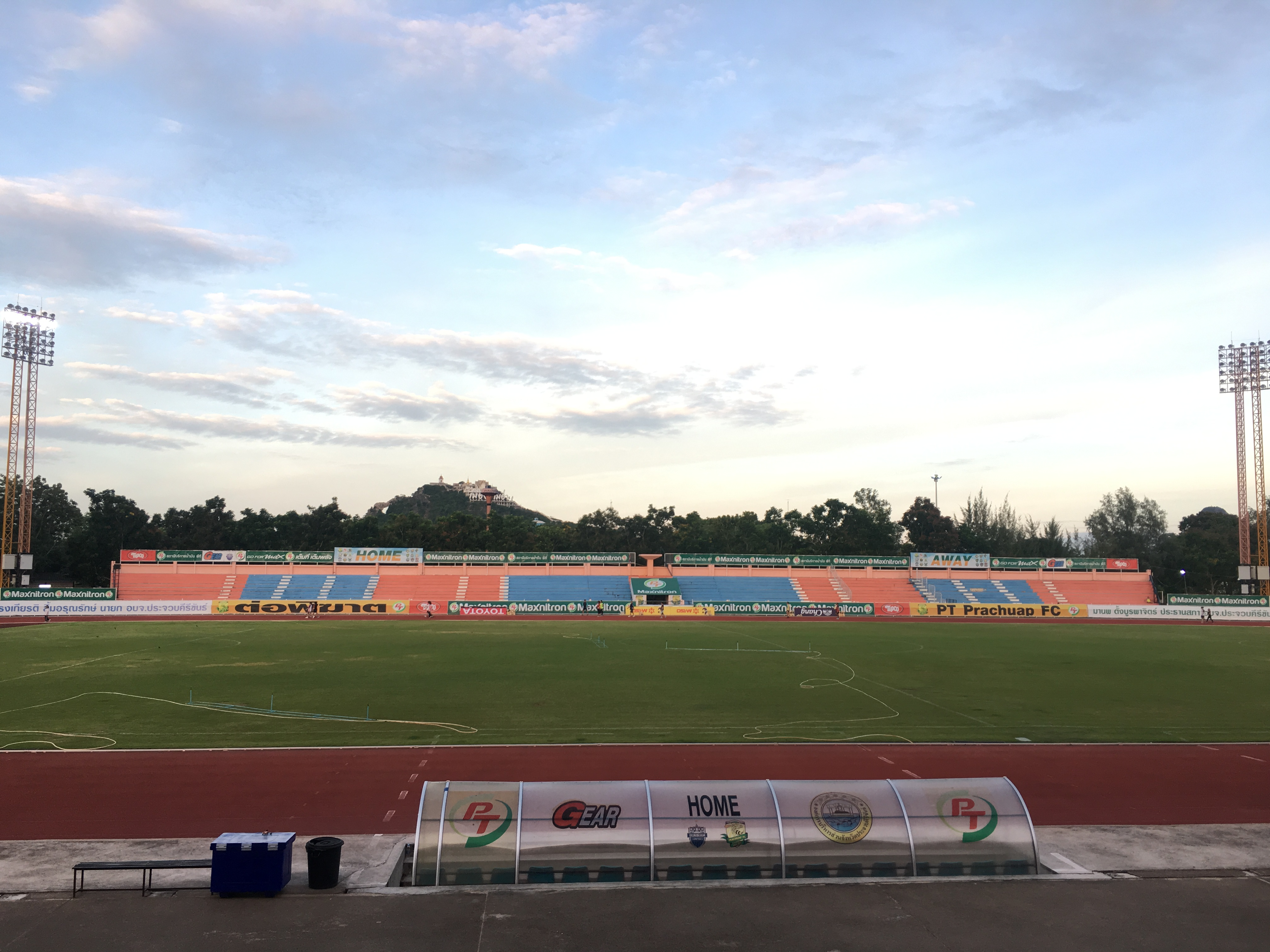
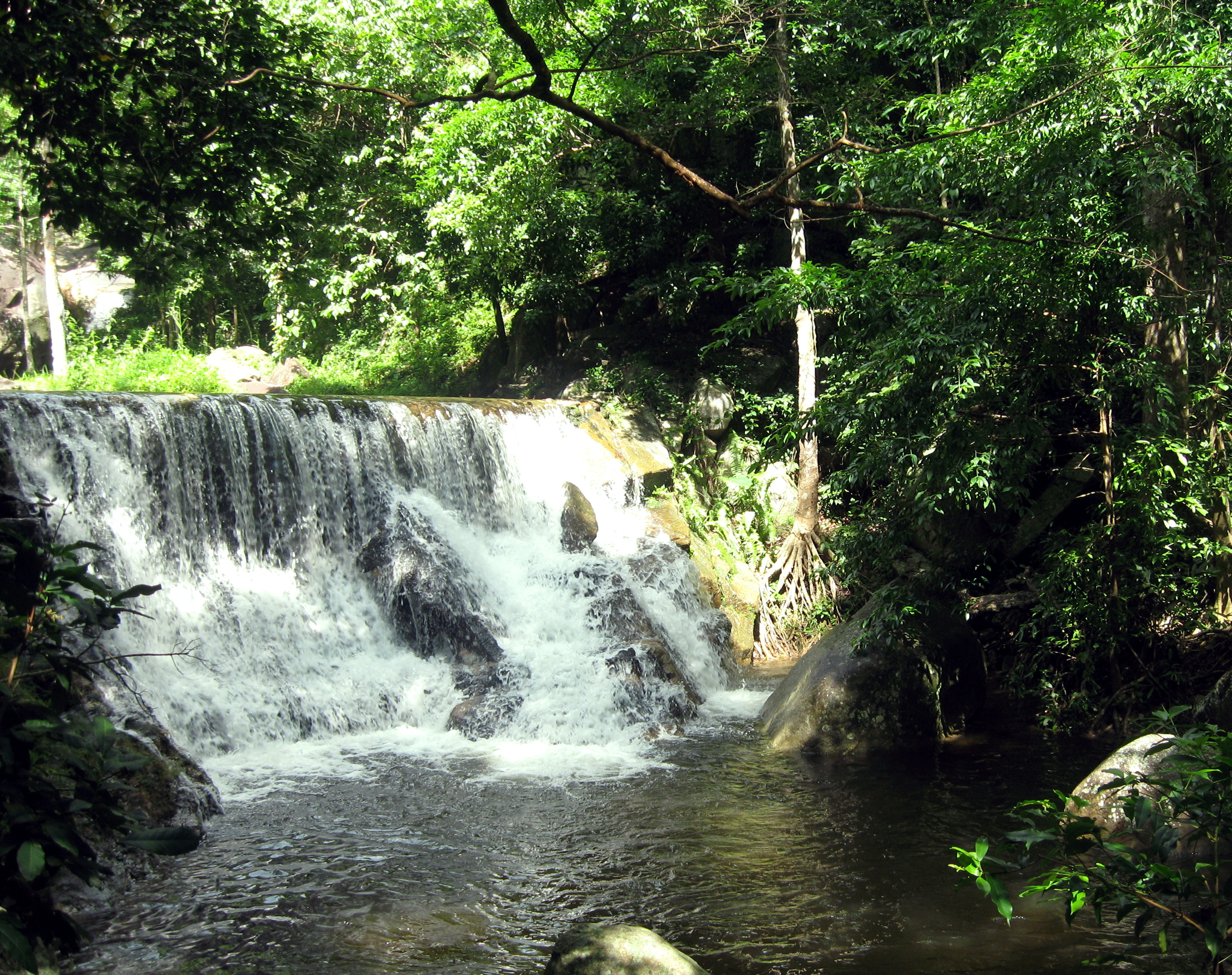
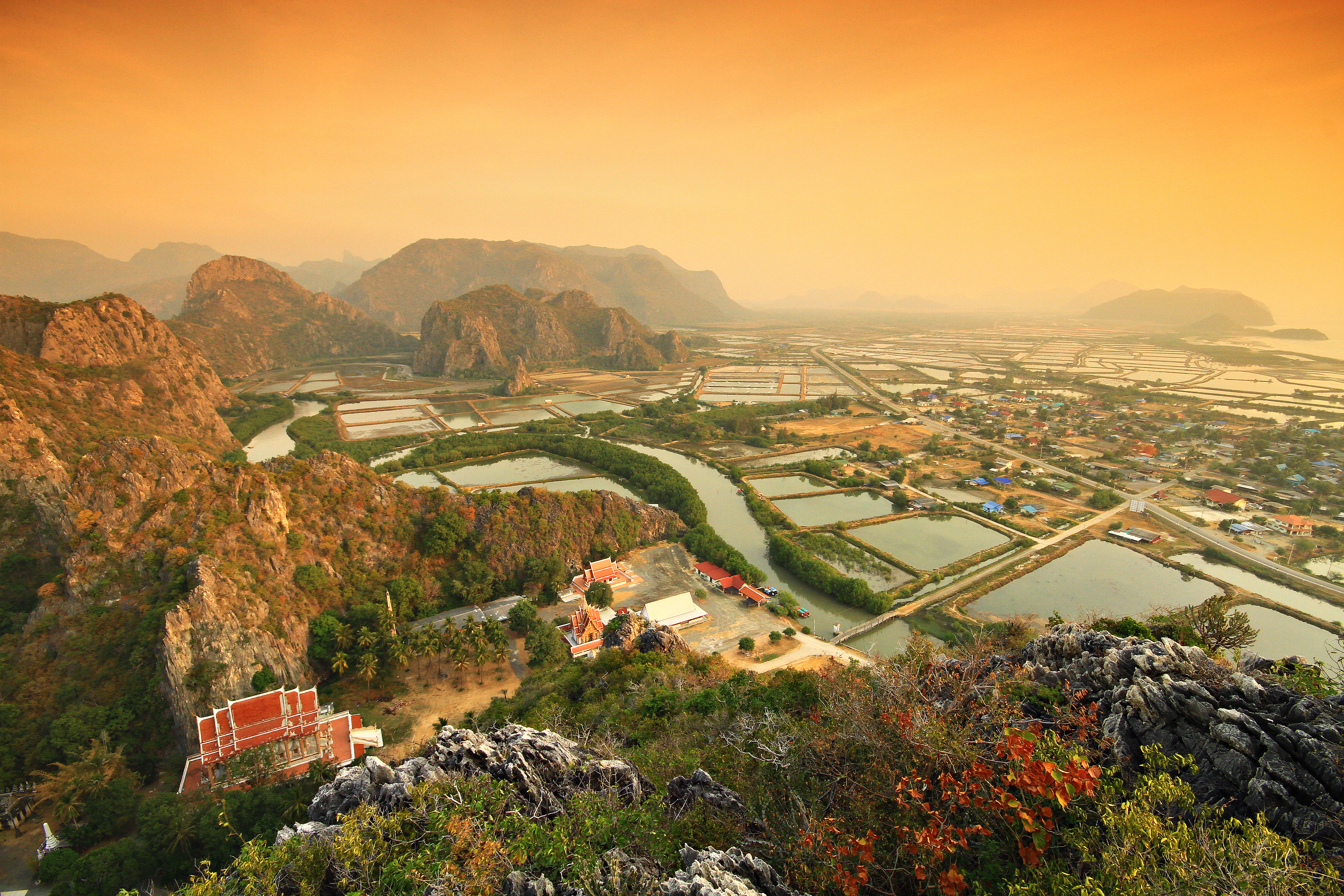
- From left to right, top to bottom : Hua Hin, Phra Mahathat Chedi Phakdee Prakat, Rajabhakti Park, Sam Ao Stadium, Namtok Huai Yang National Park, Khao Sam Roi Yot

- Flag Seal
- Nickname: Prachuap (Thai: ประจวบ)
- Mottoes: เมืองทองเนื้อเก้า มะพร้าวสับปะรด สวยสด หาด เขา ถ้ำ งามล้ำน้ำใจ ("The city of gold. Beautiful, fresh coconuts and pineapples. Beaches. Mountains. Caves. Kind and generous (people).")
- Map of Thailand highlighting Prachuap Khiri Khan province
- Country: Thailand
- Region: Western Thailand
- Capital: Prachuap Khiri Khan
- Largest City: Hua Hin

Government
  - Governor: Sitthichai Sawat-saen

Area
  - Total: 6,414 km^{2} (2,476 sq mi)
  - Rank: 34th

Population (2024)
  - Total: ▲551,769
  - Rank: 47th
  - Density: 86/km^{2} (220/sq mi)
  - Rank: 53rd

Human Achievement Index
  - HAI (2022): 0.6450 "average" Ranked 33rd

GDP
  - Total: baht 92 billion (US$3.0 billion) (2019)
- Time zone: UTC+7 (ICT)
- Postal code: 77xxx
- Calling code: 032
- ISO 3166 code: TH-77
- Website: prachuapkhirikhan.go.th

Prachuap Khiri Khan Provincial Administrative Organization องค์การบริหารส่วนจังหวัดประจวบคีรีขันธ์
- Provincial Administrative Organization
- Interactive map of Prachuap Khiri Khan Provincial Administrative Organization

Government
  - Type: Local administrative divisions
  - Body: Prachuap Khiri Khan Provincial Administrative Organization
  - President: Sarawut Lim Arunrak
- Website: prachuap.go.th

Prachuap Khiri Khan (Thai: ประจวบคีรีขันธ์, pronounced [prā.tɕùap kʰīː.rīː kʰǎn]) is one of the western provinces (changwat) of Thailand. It is in the northern part of the Malay Peninsula, some 240 km (149 mi) south of Bangkok. Neighboring provinces include Phetchaburi to the north and Chumphon to the south. To the west, it borders Tanintharyi Region of Myanmar.

== Etymology ==
"Prachuap" from the Sanskrit language prācva (प्राच्य), meaning "to meet" or "to join" referring to the province's location where the Malay Peninsula narrows and various regional towns were joined, Khiri (คีรี) from Sanskrit giri meaning "mountain" or "hill", "Khan" (ขันธ์) from the Sanskrit khanda (खण्ड) meaning "group," "cluster," or "section", thus "the hill where vari[o]us sections meet".

== History ==
The city of Muang Na Rang was reconstructed after it had been abandoned during the fall of the Ayutthaya Kingdom in 1767. During the reign of King Rama II, a new city was established at the mouth of the I Rom Canal known as Muang Bang Nang Rom. In 1855, the town was renamed "Prachuap Khiri Khan", which means 'city in the mountains'.

King Mongkut gathered the people of three towns—Bang Nangrom, Kui Buri, and Khlong Wan—and resettled them in the rebuilt city. At the same time, he renamed a portion of what is now Trat province and Koh Kong province in Cambodia "Patchan Khiri Khet". The name was chosen to rhyme with "Prachuap Khiri Khan" on the opposite side of the Gulf of Thailand at the same latitude.

In 1868, King Mongkut invited foreign guests to Prachuap Khiri Khan to watch a solar eclipse he had predicted for 18 August. The dignitaries viewed it from an observation point in the marshes near Sam Roi Yot. He contracted malaria, of which he died on 1 October.

Prachuap became a seaside resort during the reign of King Rama V. Besides tourism, the province is heavily agricultural. Coconuts are a major crop. As much as 40 percent of farmers in Prachuap Khiri Khan solely cultivate coconuts.

At the beginning of World War II, Japanese troops invaded Thailand. On 8 December 1941, they struck near the city of Prachuap Khiri Khan. The next day, after resisting the Japanese in the Battle of Prachuap Khiri Khan, the defenders were ordered to surrender by the government in Bangkok.

=== Archaeology ===
The discovery of 3,000 years old cave paintings was announced by archaeologists from the Fine Arts Office in a cave at the Khao Sam Roi Yod National Park in May 2020. Some of the depicted pictures are still visible and clear, while some paintings were damaged by limestone etching. According to archeologist Kannika Premjai, paintings describe humanlike figures with accessories on their bodies, hunting scenes with bow and arrow. Moreover, there is also an animal figure seems to be serow (a goat-like mammal found regionally) found among the drawings.

== Geography ==
Prachuap Khiri Khan covers an area totaling 6,367 square kilometers (2,458 sq mi). The province is on the Kra Isthmus, the narrow land bridge connecting the Malay Peninsula with mainland Asia. The province has one of the narrowest parts of Thailand, just 11 km (6.8 mi) from the Gulf of Thailand to the border with Myanmar in the Tenasserim Hills. Geographically, Prachuap Khiri Khan is a moderate plain with elevations varying from sea level to 1,200 m (3,900 ft). The maximum elevations are found in the northeastern and central west regions, which make up approximately 30 percent of the province. The total forest area is 2,485 km^{2} (959 sq mi) or 38.7 percent of provincial area.

The long coast of the Gulf of Thailand has many sandy beaches. One of the best known, Hua Hin, has been a popular resort town since King Prajadhipok (Rama VII) built a summer palace there. From the coast the land quickly rises into the Tenasserim Hills, the mountain chain that forms the border with Myanmar. Due to its narrow watershed, the rivers in the province are all small. The only one of significance is the Pranburi River in the north. Among the smaller rivers is the Khlong Kui.

Prachuap Khiri Khan has a dubbed as "Mueang Sam Ao", which meaning "city of three bays", refers to Ao Noi, Ao Prachup, and Ao Manao all three bays are lined up and are located in the area of Mueang Prachuap Khiri Khan District.

Khao Sam Roi Yot National Park was established in 1966 to protect Thailand's largest freshwater marshes. The park contains some mangrove forests and mudflats. Most of the marshes were converted into shrimp farms, despite being in a national park. There are a total of six national parks, make up region 3 (Phetchaburi branch) of Thailand's protected areas.(Visitors in fiscal year 2024)

Kaeng Krachan National Park	2,915 km^{2} (1,125 sq mi)	(139,674)
Kui Buri National Park	969 km^{2} (374 sq mi)	(30,199)
Namtok Huai Yang National Park	161 km^{2} (62 sq mi)	(12,751)
Khao Sam Roi Yot National Park	98 km^{2} (38 sq mi)	(155,660)
Hat Wanakon National Park	38 km^{2} (15 sq mi)	(41,341)
Ao Siam National Park	13 km^{2} (5.0 sq mi)	(19,457)

There is Prince Chumphon North Park (upper) Wildlife Sanctuary 378 km^{2} (146 sq mi)

Location protected areas of Prachuap Khiri Khan

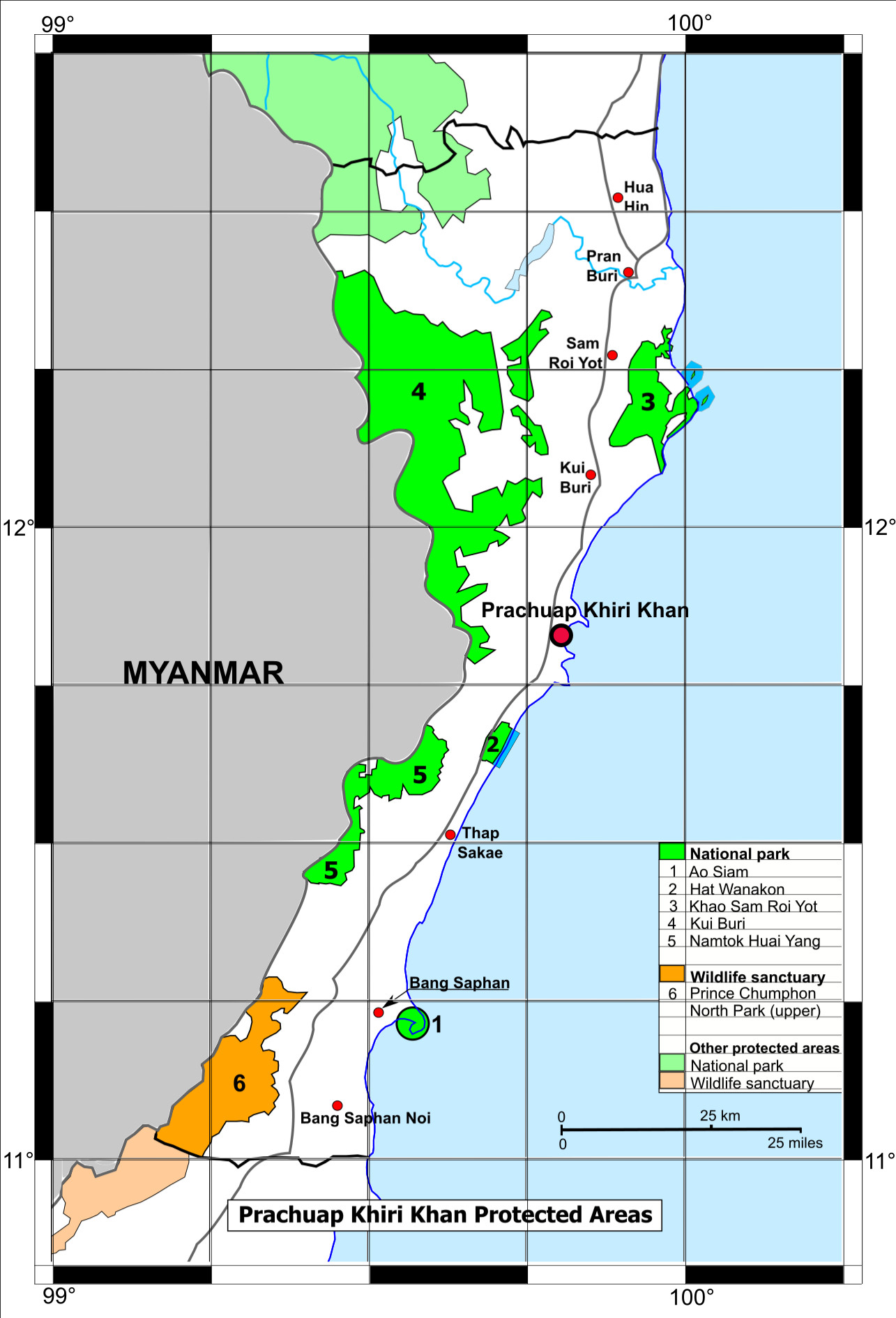
Prachuap Khiri Khan protected areas

	National park
1	Ao Siam
2	Hat Wanakon
3	Khao Sam Roi Yot
4	Kui Buri
5	Namtok Huai Yang

	Wildlife sanctuary
6	Prince Chumphon North Park (upper)

== Symbols ==
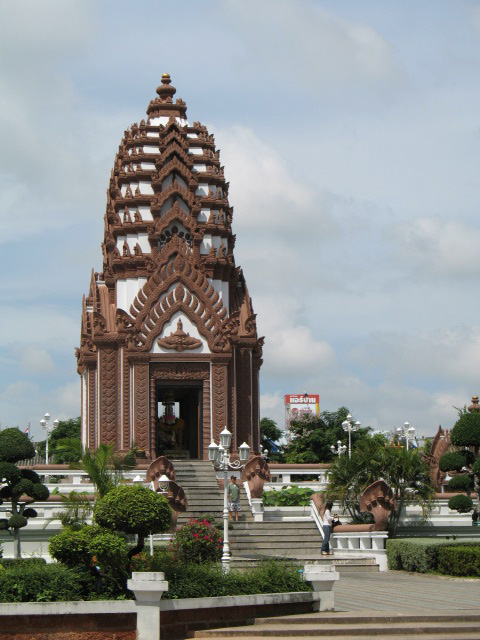
Prachuap Khiri Khan Lak Mueang

The provincial seal shows the Kuha Karuhas Pavilion, which was built when King Chulalongkorn (Rama V) visited the Praya Nakorn Cave (Sam Roi Yot District). Depicted behind the pavilion is the island of Ko Lak in Prachuap Bay, the historic center of administration.

The provincial tree as well as the provincial flower is the rayan or manilkara (Manilkara hexandra). Milkfish (Chanos chanos) is the provincial fish.

The provincial slogan is 'City of pure gold, delectable coconuts and pineapples, delightful beaches, mountain and caves, land of spiritual beauty'.

== Administrative divisions ==
Map of eight districts

=== Provincial government ===
The province is divided into eight districts (amphoes). The districts are further divided into 48 subdistricts (tambons) and 388 villages (mubans).

1. Mueang Prachuap Khiri Khan
2. Kui Buri
3. Thap Sakae
4. Bang Saphan
5. Bang Saphan Noi
6. Pran Buri
7. Hua Hin
8. Sam Roi Yot

=== Local government ===
As of 26 November 2019 there are: one Prachuap Khiri Khan Provincial Administration Organisation (ongkan borihan suan changwat) and 16 municipal (thesaban) areas in the province. Prachuap Khiri khan and Hua Hin have town (thesaban mueang) status. Further 14 subdistrict municipalities (thesaban tambon). The non-municipal areas are administered by 44 Subdistrict Administrative Organisations - SAO (ongkan borihan suan tambon).

== Transport ==
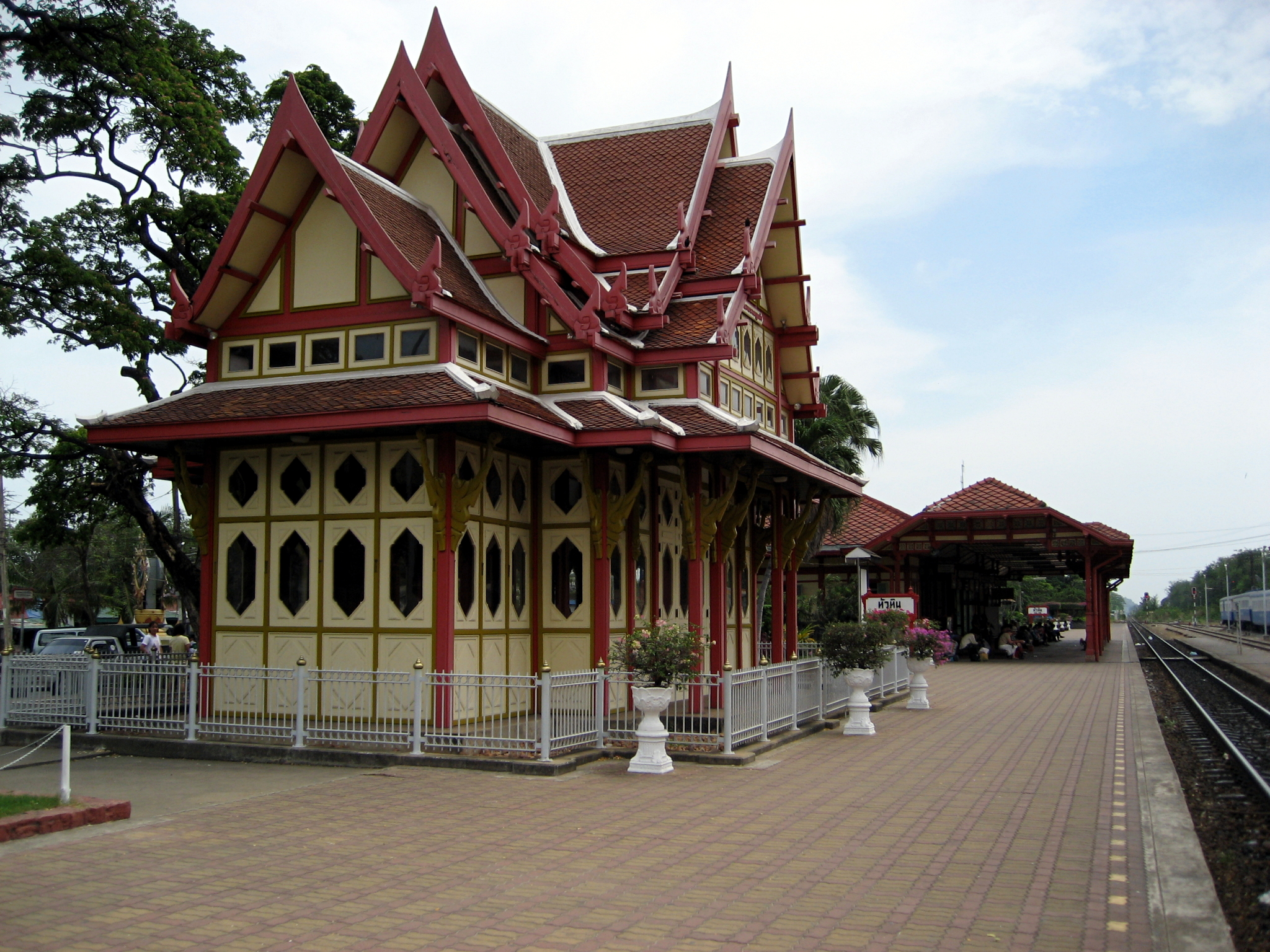
Hua Hin Railway Station

Air

Hua Hin Airport is in Hua Hin District. AirAsia serves the airport with a direct flight to Kuala Lumpur that commenced on 18 May 2018. On 7 August 2020, AirAsia flight to Huahin from Chiang Mai and from Udon Thani every Friday and Sunday.

Rail

The railway in Prachuap Khiri Khan is on the southern route from Bangkok. There are five major stations in Prachuap Khiri Khan: Hua Hin Railway Station, Pran Buri Railway Station, Prachuap Khiri Khan Railway Station, Bang Saphan Yai Railway Station, and Bang Saphan Noi Railway Station.

Road

Prachuap is on Highway 4 (Phetkasem Road), which links the central region with the south.

== Health ==
The Ministry of Public Health operates two large general hospitals in the province: Hua Hin Hospital and Prachuap Khiri Khan Hospital. The other remaining districts are served by community hospitals.

== Human achievement index 2022 ==
Health	Education	Employment	Income
13	14	5	23
Housing	Family	Transport	Participation
53	62	71	63
Province Prachuap Khiri Khan, with an HAI 2022 value of 0.6450 is "average", occupies place 33 in the ranking.

Since 2003, United Nations Development Programme (UNDP) in Thailand has tracked progress on human development at sub-national level using the Human achievement index (HAI), a composite index covering all the eight key areas of human development. National Economic and Social Development Board (NESDB) has taken over this task since 2017.

Rank	Classification
1 - 13	"high"
14 - 29	"somewhat high"
30 - 45	"average"
46 - 61	"somewhat low"
62 - 77	"low"

Map with provinces and HAI 2022 rankings

== Tourism ==
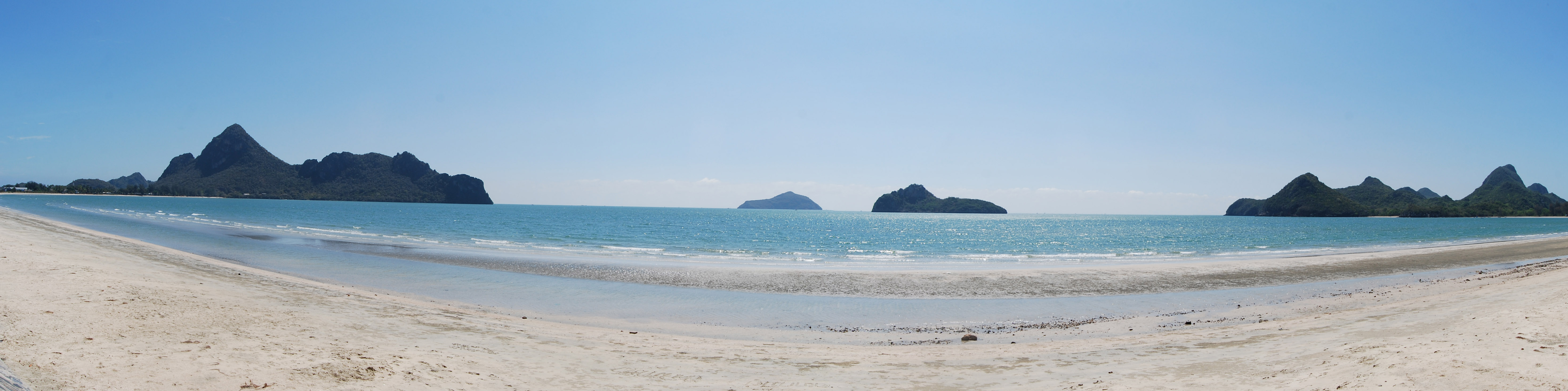
Ao Manao

Thailand's royal family and especially former kings were the first to set this location on the map as the original seashore destination in Thailand. Besides sunbathing, snorkeling, and swimming, visitors can also enjoy golf, spas, caves, peaks, waterfalls, shops, and nearby national parks.

== Gallery ==
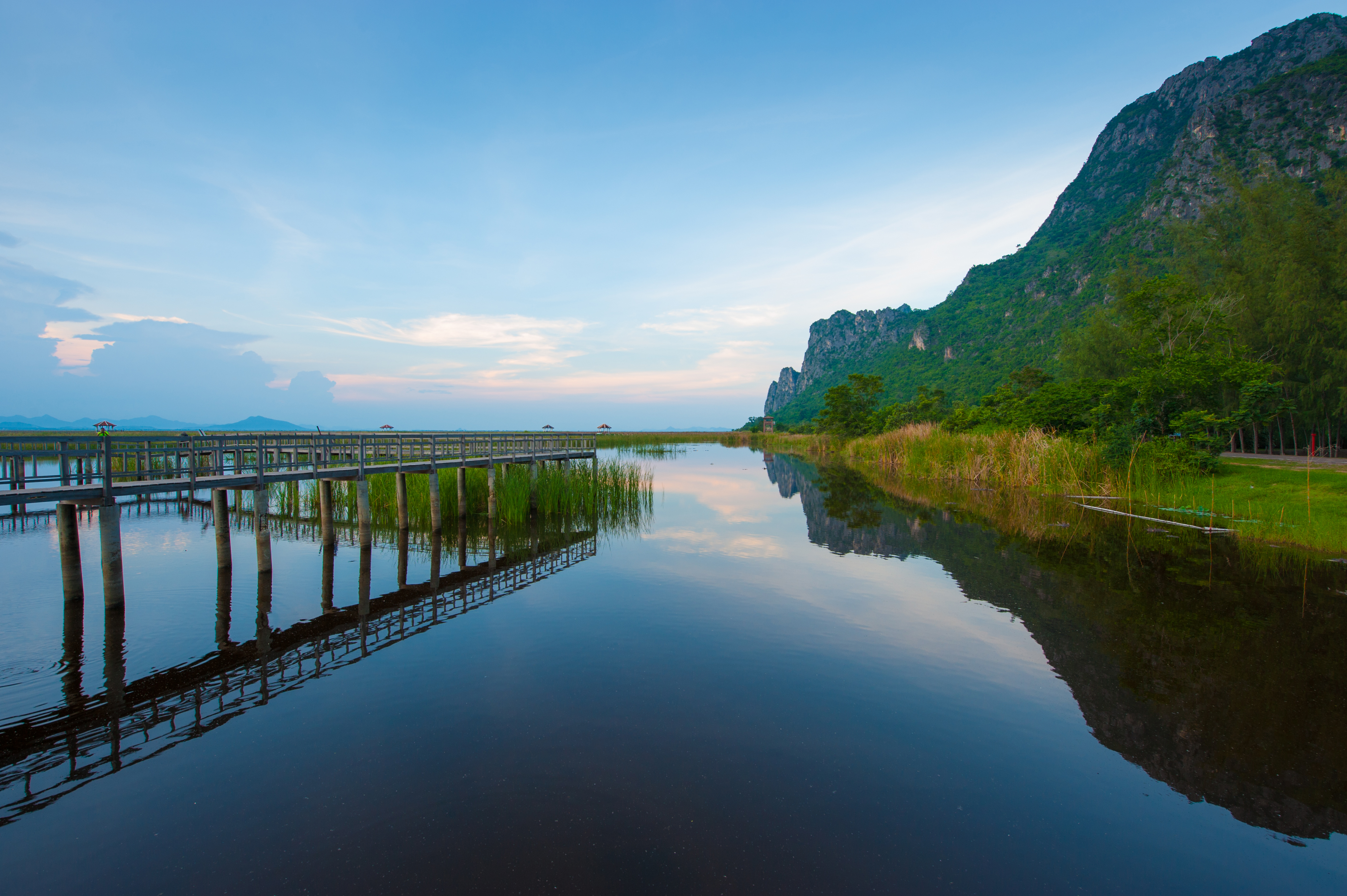
The evening reflection of a mountain in the "lotus pond", Khao Sam Roi Yot National Park

Khao Sam Roi Yot National Park

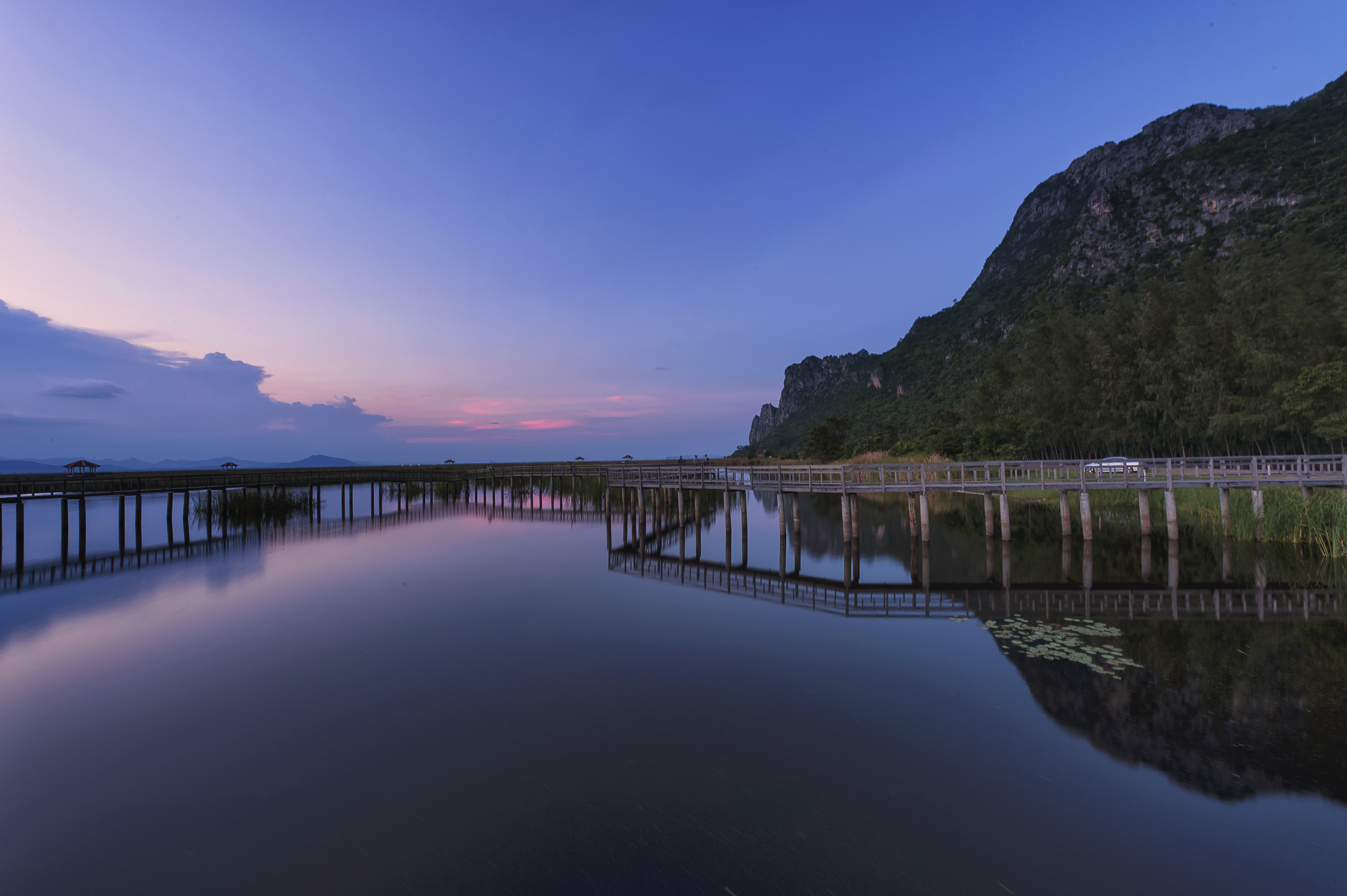
Khao Sam Roi Yot National Park

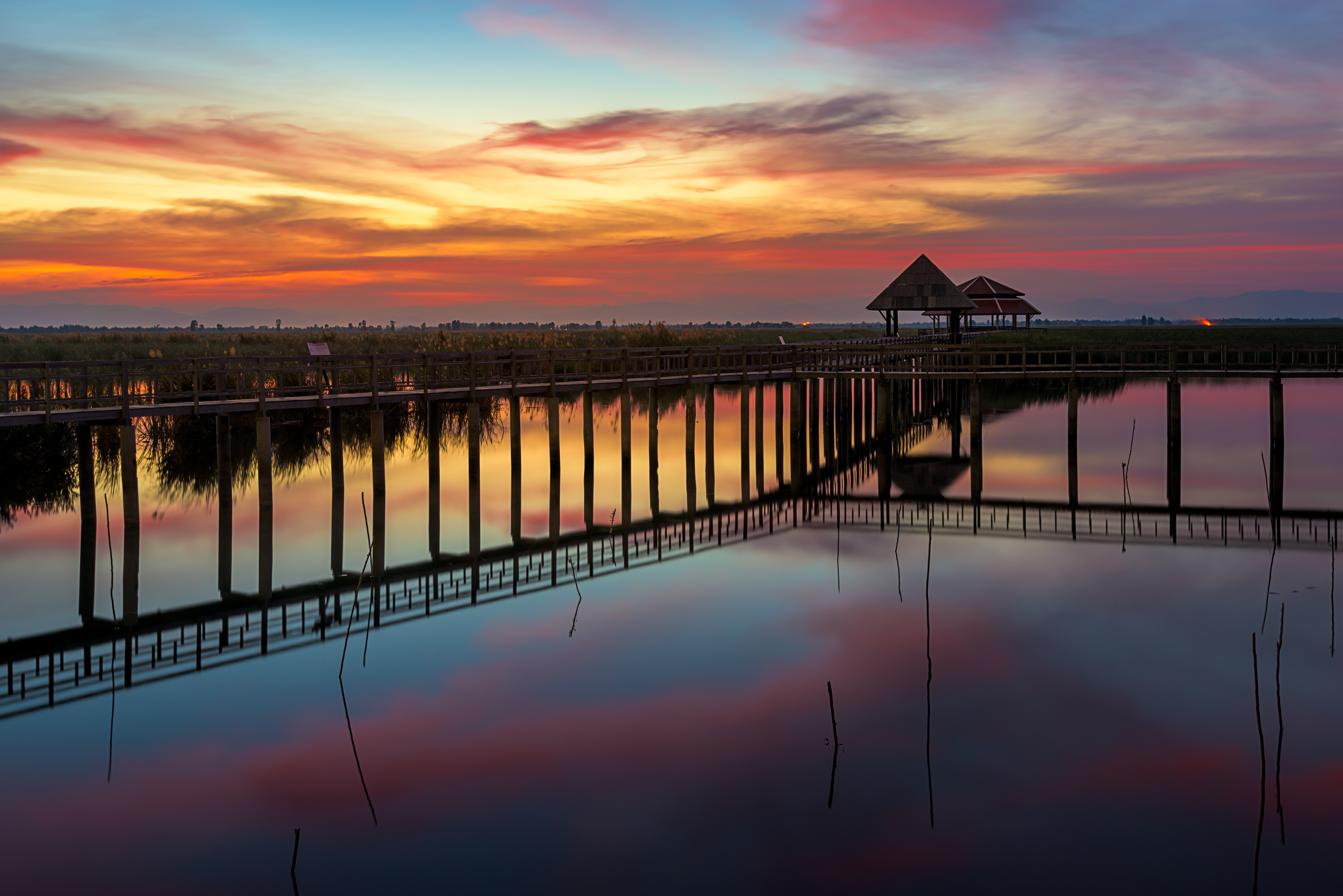
Khao Sam Roi Yot National Park

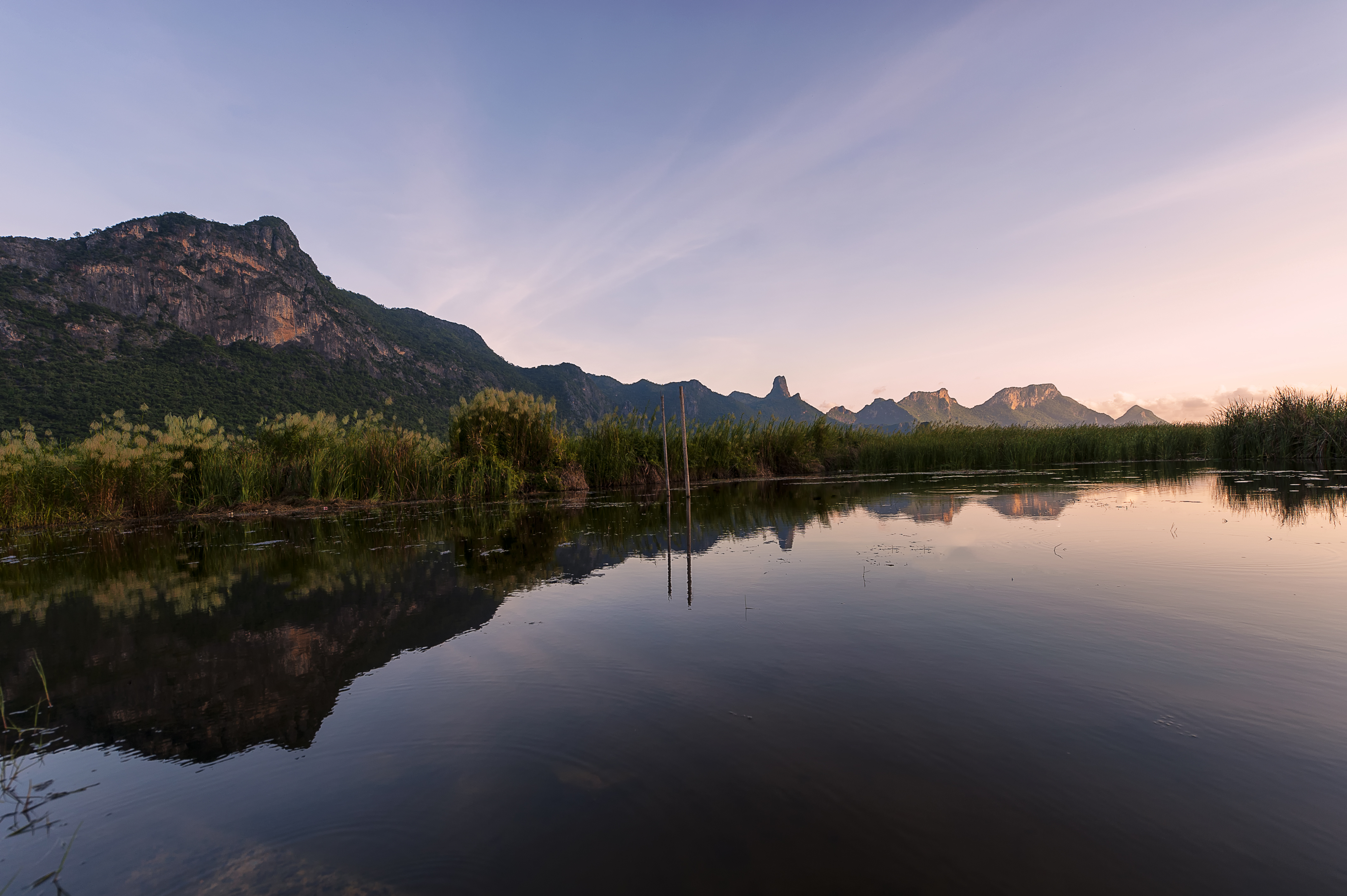
Khao Sam Roi Yot National Park

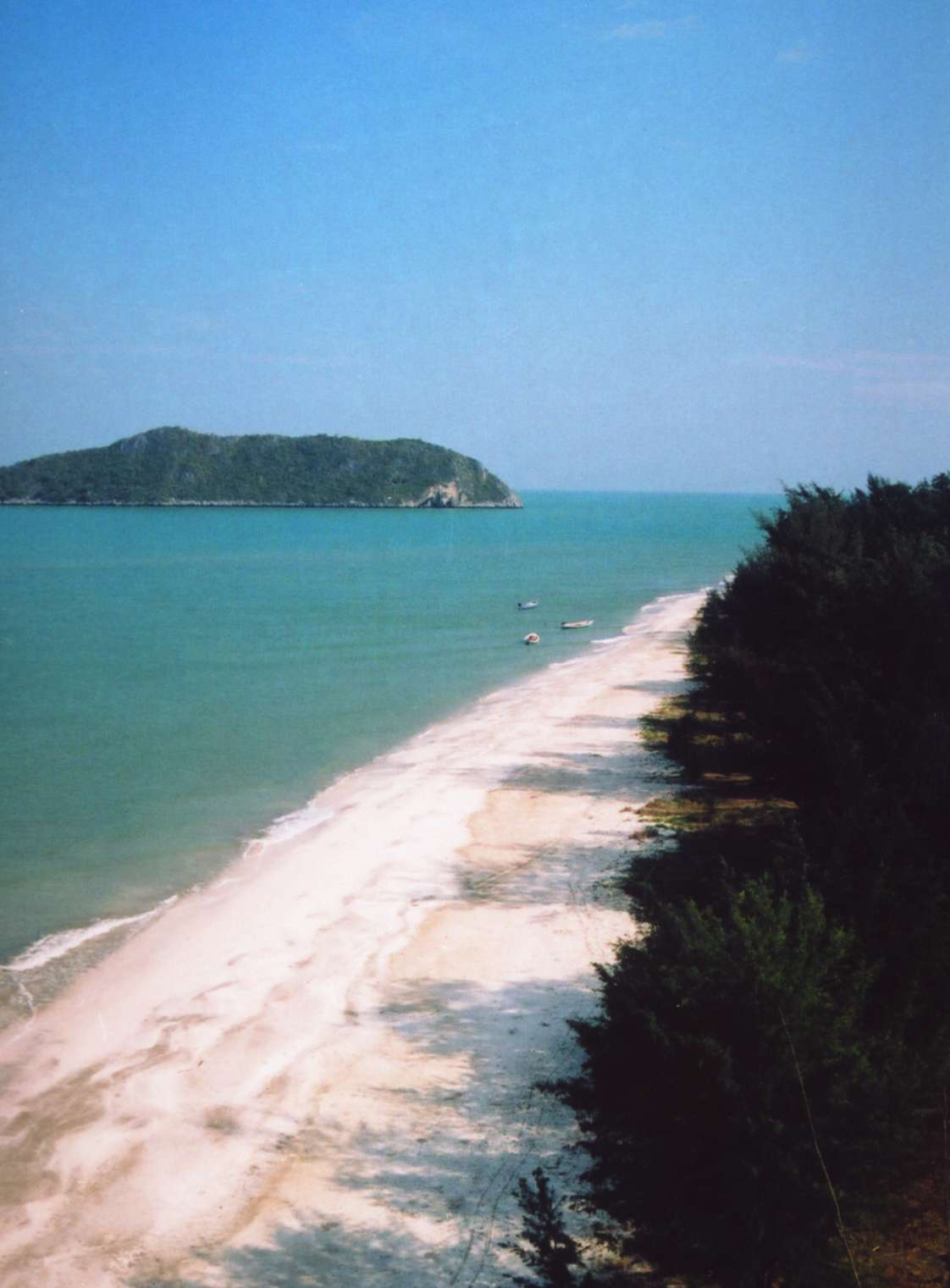
Laem Sala Beach

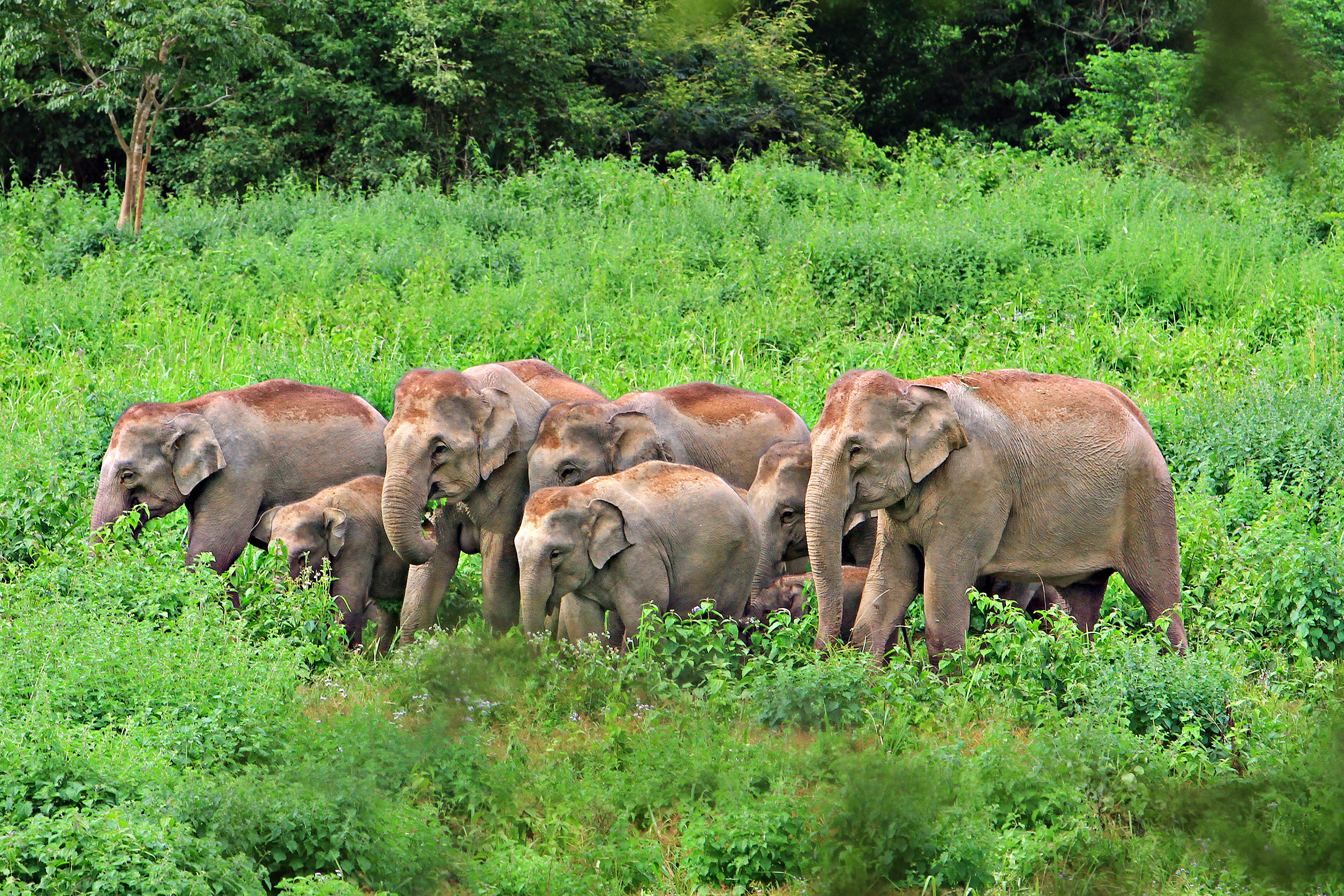
Elephant in Kui Buri National Park

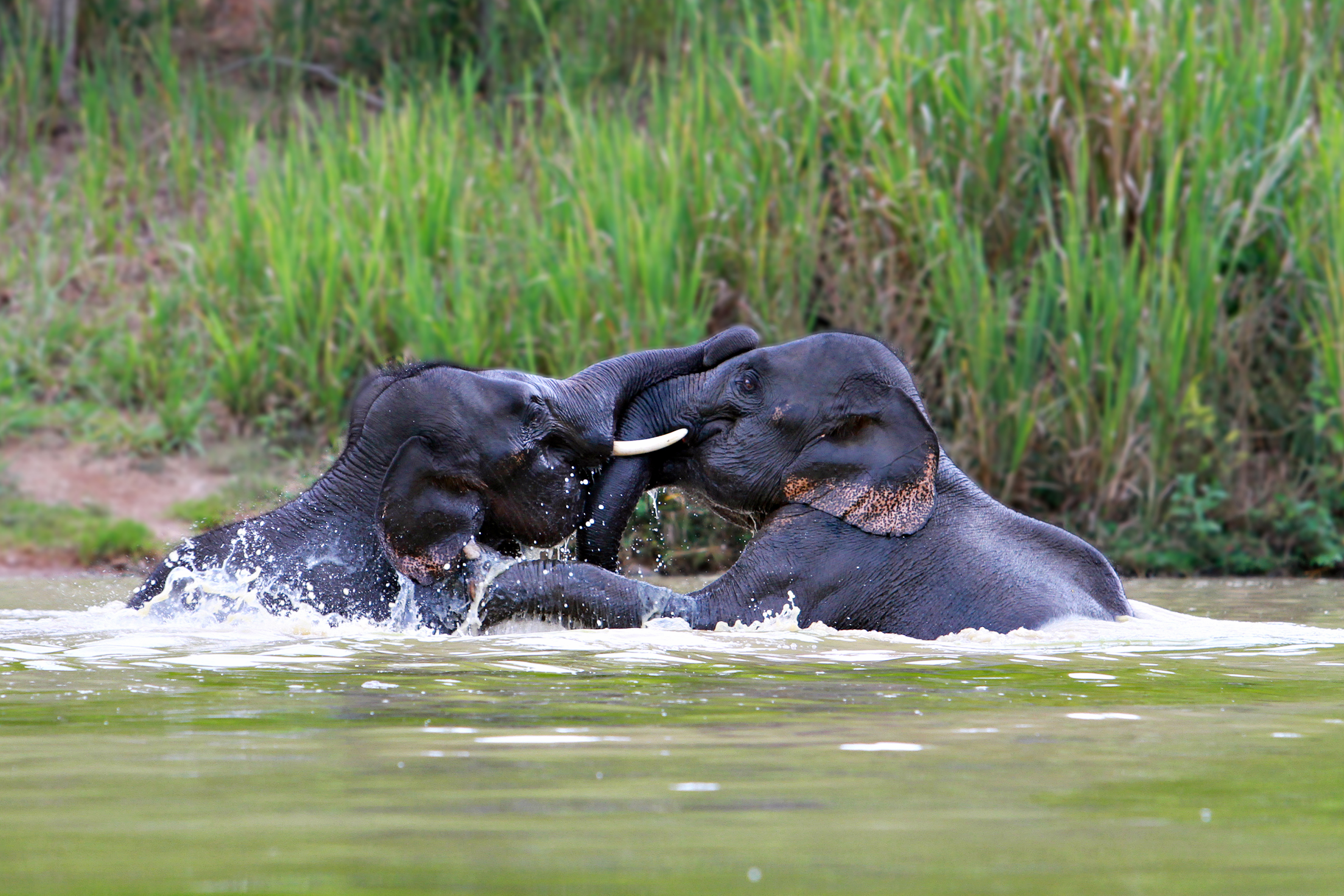
Elephant in Kui Buri National Park

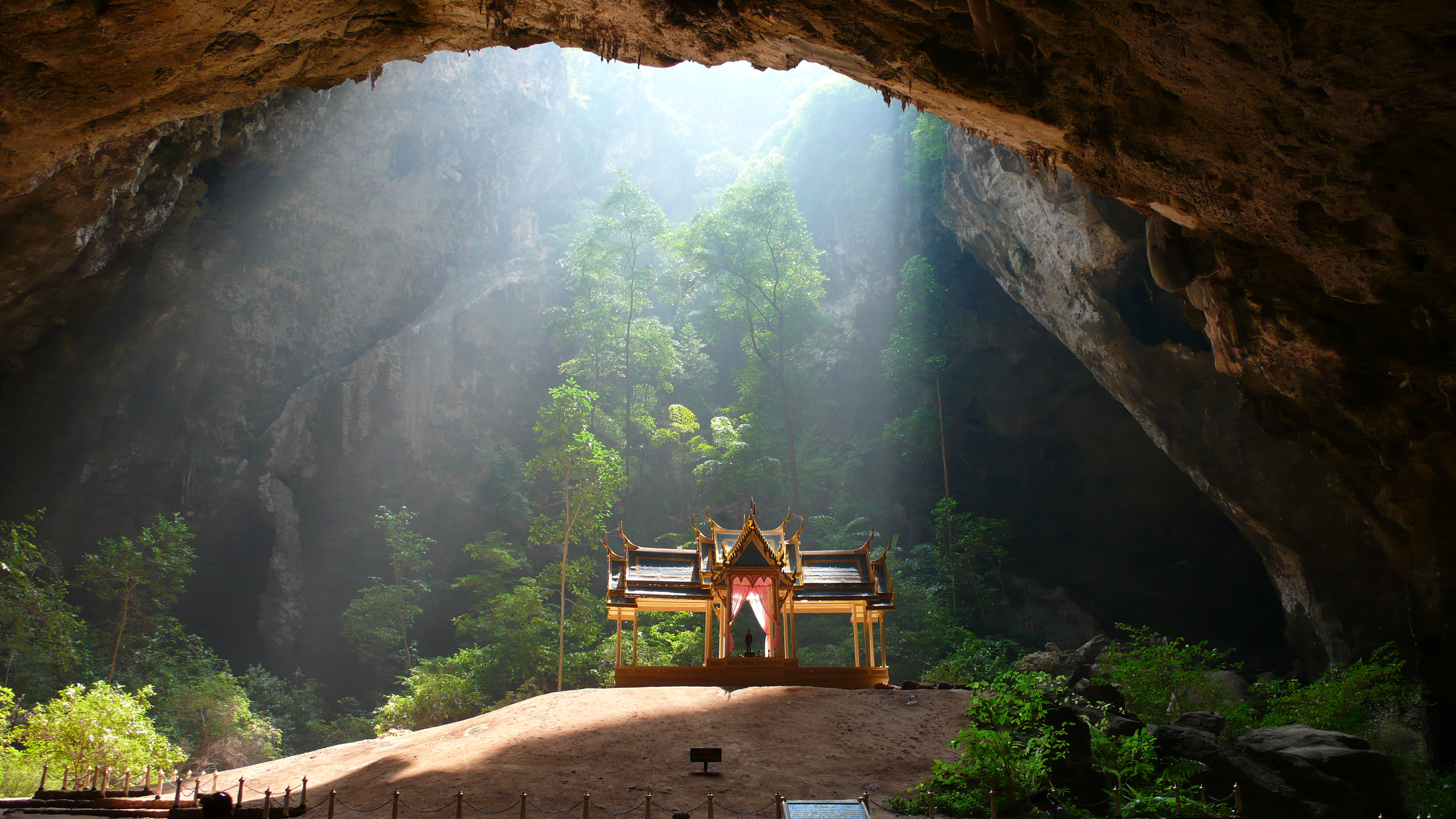
Kuha Karuhas Pavilion, inside Phraya Nakhon Cave
