= Thap Sakae district =

Thap Sakae ทับสะแก
- District
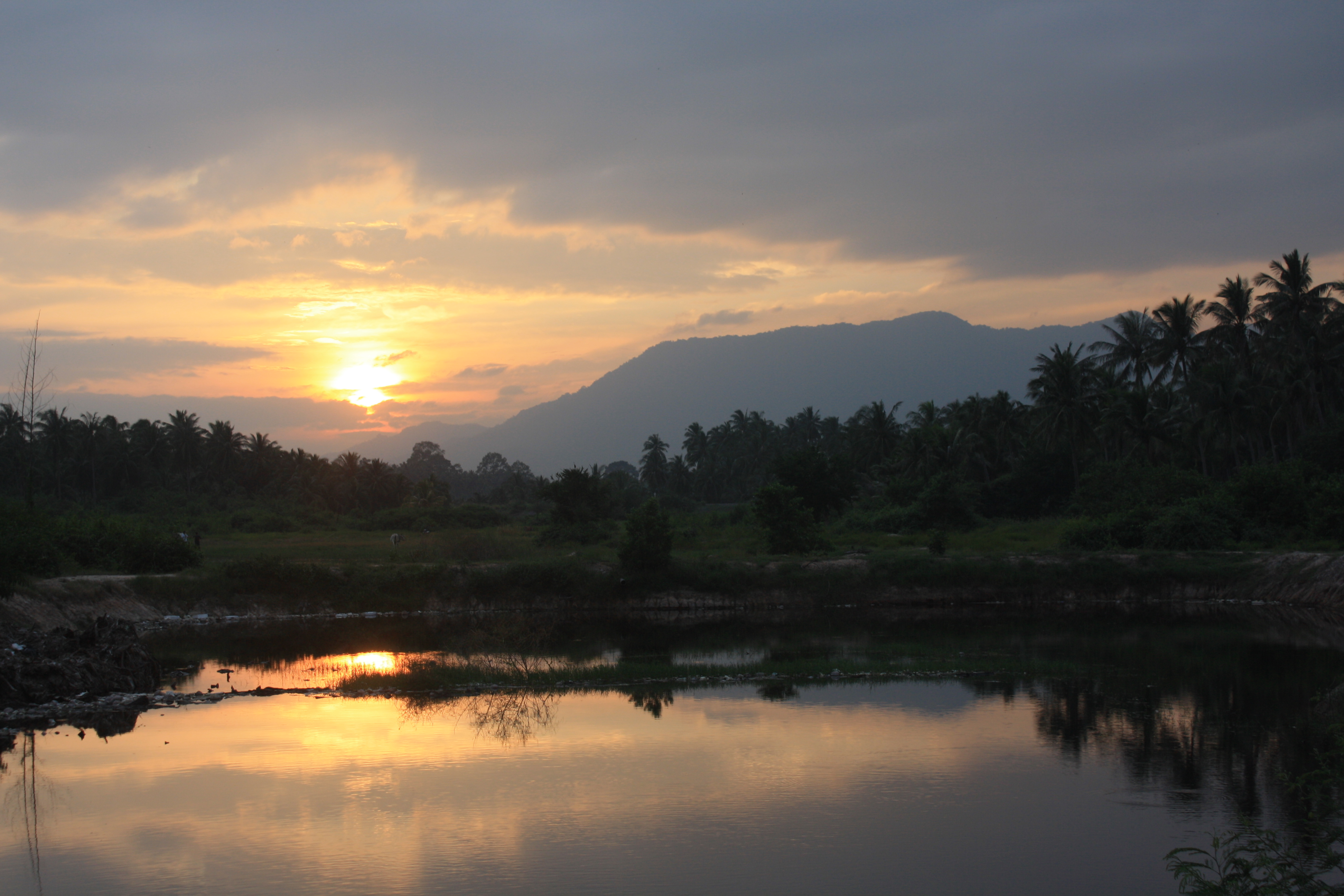
- Huai Yang, Thap Sakae, view toward the Myanmar border

- District location in Prachuap Khiri Khan province
- Coordinates: 11°30′0″N 99°37′18″E
- Country: Thailand
- Province: Prachuap Khiri Khan

Area
  - Total: 538.0 km^{2} (207.7 sq mi)

Population (January 2025)
  - Total: 48,780
  - Density: 90.67/km^{2} (234.8/sq mi)
- Time zone: UTC+7 (ICT)
- Postal code: 77130
- Geocode: 7703

Thap Sakae (Thai: ทับสะแก, pronounced [tʰáp sākɛ̄ː]) is a district (amphoe) in the southern part of Prachuap Khiri Khan province, central Thailand.

== History ==
The area of Thap Sakae was separated from Mueang Prachuap Khiri Khan and Bang Saphan district. Due to its fertile land and sea, many people migrated to this area and established three villages, Huai Yang, Ang Thong, and Thap Sakae. When these villages grew bigger, the government established Thap Sakae minor district (king amphoe) on 1 March 1939. It was upgraded to a full district on 23 July 1958.

== Geography ==
Neighboring districts are Mueang Prachuap Khiri Khan to the north and Bang Saphan to the south. To the west is the Tanintharyi Division of Myanmar, to the east the Gulf of Thailand.

The Huai Yang Waterfall National Park is in this district.

== Administration ==
The district is divided into six sub-districts (tambons), which are further subdivided into 65 villages (mubans). Thap Sakae is also a sub-district municipality (thesaban tambon), which covers parts of the tambon Thap Sakae. There are further six tambon administrative organizations (TAO) covering the non-municipal areas.

No.	Name	Thai	Villages	Pop.
1.	Thap Sakae	ทับสะแก	11	9,763
2.	Ang Thong	อ่างทอง	11	5,269
3.	Na Hu Kwang	นาหูกวาง	13	8,448
4.	Khao Lan	เขาล้าน	11	8,555
5.	Huai Yang	ห้วยยาง	13	9,104
6.	Saeng Arun	แสงอรุณ	6	3,829
