= Sam Roi Yot railway station =

Railway station in Rai Kao, Thailand

Sam Roi Yot สามร้อยยอด
- Station in 2025

General information
- Location: Prachuap Khiri Khan Local Road No. 2069, Mu 2 (Ban Sam Roi Yot), Rai Kao Subdistrict, Sam Roi Yot District, Prachuap Khiri Khan
- Owner: State Railway of Thailand
- Line: Southern Line
- Platforms: 2
- Tracks: 5

Other information
- Station code: สย.

History
- Opened: 1 June 1914

Services
Preceding station	State Railway of Thailand	Following station
Nong Khang towards Hua Lamphong or Krung Thep Aphiwat	Southern Line	Sam Krathai towards Su-ngai Kolok
Location

Sam Roi Yot railway station (Thai: สถานีสามร้อยยอด) is a railway station located in Rai Kao Subdistrict, Sam Roi Yot District, Prachuap Khiri Khan. It is a class 3 railway station located 254.996 km (158.4 mi) from Thon Buri railway station. It serves as the main station of Sam Roi Yot District.

The station opened on 1 June 1914 as part of the Southern Line extension from Wang Phong to Prachuap Khiri Khan. The station was rebuilt with elevated platforms and a container yard in 2022 as part of the double-track section from Nakhon Pathom to Chumphon.

== Services ==
- Ordinary 251/252 Thon Buri - Prachuap Khiri Khan - Thon Buri
- Ordinary 254/255 Lang Suan - Thon Buri - Lang Suan

== Gallery ==
Renovated station building
