= Huai Khwang railway halt =

Railway stop in Sila Loi, Thailand

Huai Khwang ห้วยขวาง
- Railway halt in 2025

General information
- Location: Mu 1 (Ban Huai Khwang), Sila Loi Subdistrict, Sam Roi Yot District, Prachuap Khiri Khan
- Owner: State Railway of Thailand
- Line: Southern Line
- Platforms: 2
- Tracks: 2

Other information
- Station code: ขว.

History
- Opened: 1 June 1914

Services
Preceding station	State Railway of Thailand	Following station
Pran Buri towards Hua Lamphong or Krung Thep Aphiwat	Southern Line	Nong Khang towards Su-ngai Kolok
Location

Huai Khwang railway halt (Thai: ที่หยุดรถห้วยขวาง) is a railway halt located in Sila Loi Subdistrict, Sam Roi Yot District, Prachuap Khiri Khan. It is located 241.932 km (150.3 mi) from Thon Buri Railway Station.

The halt opened on 1 June 1914 as part of the Southern Line extension from Wang Phong to Prachuap Khiri Khan. The halt was rebuilt with elevated platforms in 2022 as part of the double-track section from Nakhon Pathom to Chumphon.

== Train services ==
- Ordinary 254/255 Lang Suan - Thon Buri - Lang Suan
