= Sam Krathai railway station =

Railway station in Sam Krathai, Thailand

Sam Krathai สามกระทาย
- Station in 2025

General information
- Location: Mu 2 (Ban Sam Krathai), Sam Krathai Subdistrict, Kui Buri District, Prachuap Khiri Khan
- Owner: State Railway of Thailand
- Line: Southern Line
- Platforms: 2
- Tracks: 2

Other information
- Station code: สท.

History
- Opened: 1 June 1914
- Former names: Sam Prathai, Sang Krathai

Services
Preceding station	State Railway of Thailand	Following station
Sam Roi Yot towards Hua Lamphong or Krung Thep Aphiwat	Southern Line	Kui Buri towards Su-ngai Kolok
Location

Sam Krathai railway station (Thai: สถานีสามกระทาย) is a railway station located in Sam Krathai Subdistrict, Kui Buri District, Prachuap Khiri Khan. It is a class 3 railway station located 261.159 km (162.3 mi) from Thon Buri railway station.

The station originally opened as a railway halt on 1 June 1914 as part of the Southern Line extension from Wang Phong to Prachuap Khiri Khan. It was upgraded to a staffed station on 18 February 1982. The station was rebuilt with elevated platforms in 2022 as part of the double-track section from Nakhon Pathom to Chumphon.

The station has changed its name several times. It was first called Sam Prathai (Thai: สัมประทาย) until when it was changed to Sang Krathai (Thai: สังกระทาย) after 1938. It was recently changed to its current name after 2007.

== Services ==
- Ordinary 251/252 Thon Buri - Prachuap Khiri Khan - Thon Buri
- Ordinary 254/255 Lang Suan - Thon Buri - Lang Suan

== Gallery ==
Renovated station building
