= Phraya Nakhon Cave =

Cave in Thailand

Phraya Nakhon cave
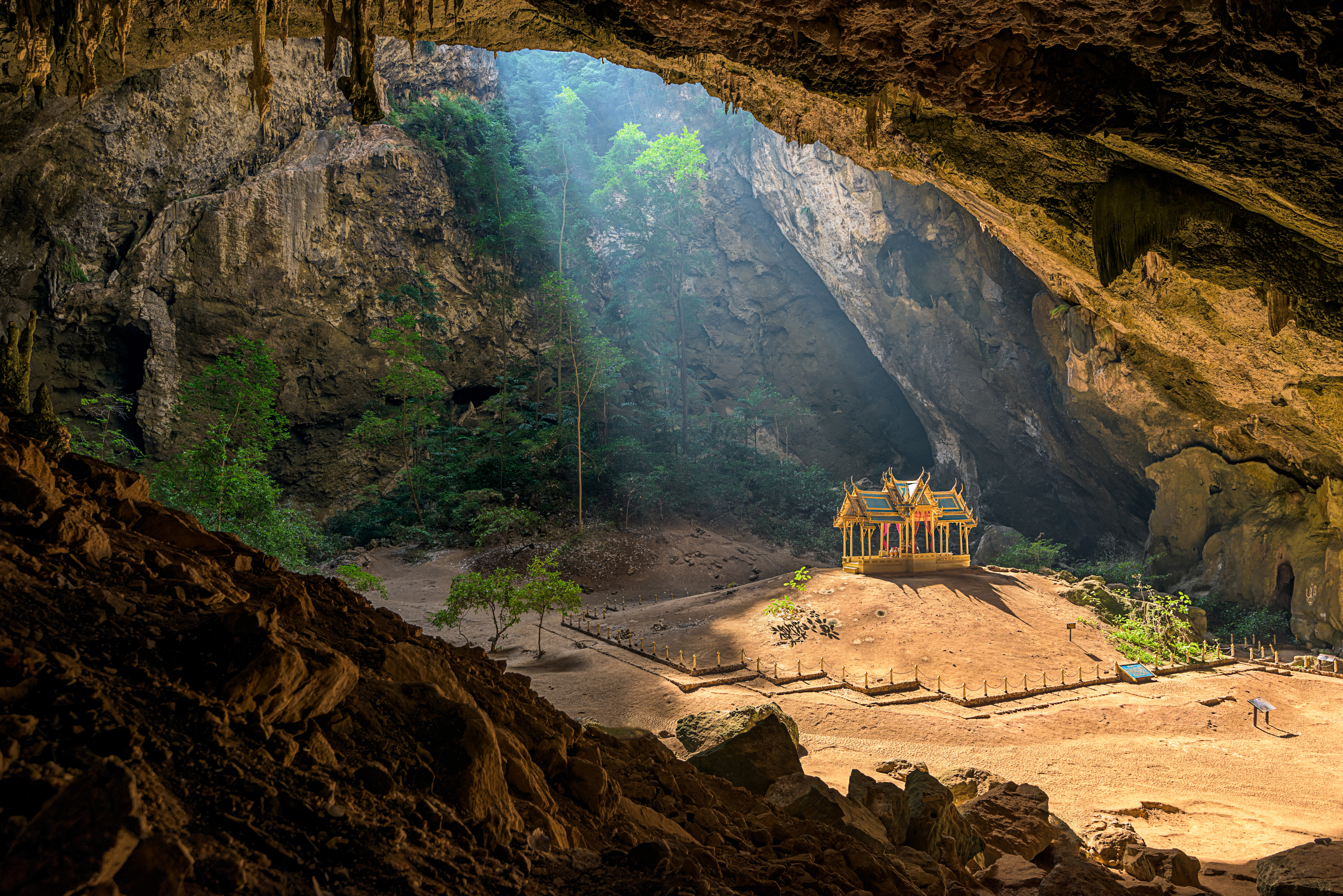
- Phraya Nakhon Cave

- Location within Thailand
- Location: Sam Roi Yot district, Prachuap Khiri Khan Province, Thailand
- Coordinates: 12°10′57″N 100°0′40″E
- Elevation: 130 m above sea level
- Discovery: Chao Phraya Nakhon Sri Thammarat, early 1800s
- Geology: Limestone

The Phraya Nakhon cave (Thai: ถ้ำพระยานคร, romanized: Tham Phraya Nakhon) is a cave in Khao Sam Roi Yot National Park, Hua Hin, Prachuap Khiri Khan Province, Thailand. It features the royal Kuha Karuhas Pavilion, illuminated by natural sunlight through a large skylight. The cave is accessible by a forested hike and has two chambers with rock formations as well as ancient inscriptions.

== Location ==
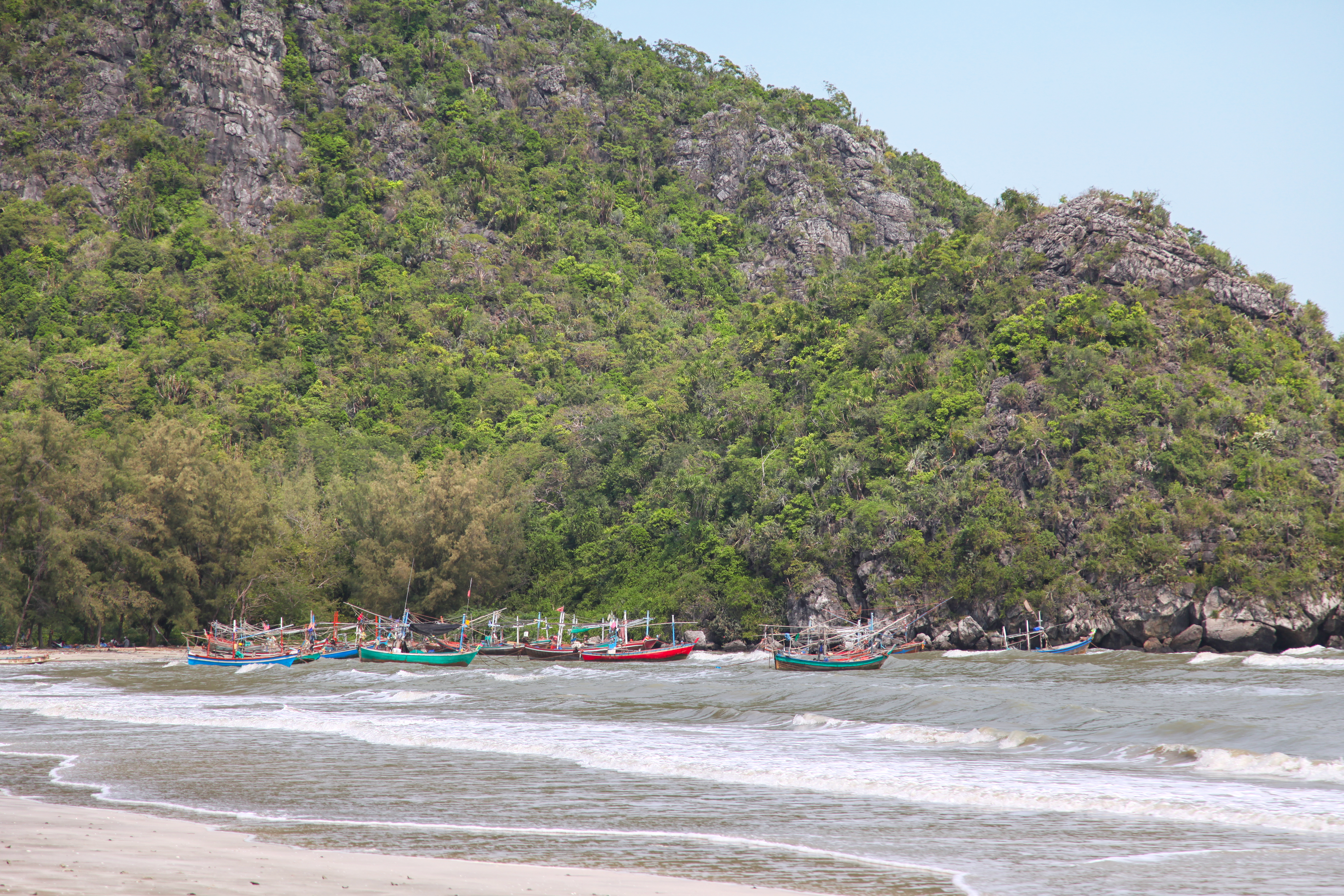
Khao Sam Roi Yot National Park

Phraya Nakhon Cave is in a forested mountainous area near Laem Sala Beach, in the Khao Sam Roi Yot National Park in Prachuap Khiri Khan province, southern Thailand. The cave is accessed by boat and a walk of 430 meters to the cave.

== History ==
The discovery of Phraya Nakhon Cave has been linked to King Rama I, who, while sailing past Khao Sam Roi Yot and a big storm came up, making it impossible to continue. He anchored his ship to take shelter from the storm at Laem Sala Beach for several days.

The cave's discovery is also linked to Phraya Nakhon, the ruler of Nakhon Si Thammarat, although the exact figure remains uncertain. It is believed that Phraya Nakhon, either from the Ayutthaya period or the Rattanakosin period, stumbled upon the cave while seeking shelter from a storm. During the Ayutthaya period, under King Narai (1656–1688), one theory suggests that Phraya Nakhon used the cave to escape rough waves and royal condemnation during a journey to the capital. However, he was ultimately executed in the cave.

Another version from the Rattanakosin period during King Rama I's reign (1782–1809) describes Phraya Nakhon fleeing after being misled by Burmese forces, who claimed the capital had fallen. On his return journey after discovering the truth, he took refuge in the cave to avoid intense storms, and along the way, he is believed to have constructed a brick well, now known as "Phraya Nakhon's Well," measuring 1 meter in width and 4 meters in depth.

Multiple Thai monarchs have visited the cave, including King Rama IV, who documented his visit during a southern royal tour, and King Rama V, who visited several times between 1863 and 1890. The Kuha Karuhas Pavilion, built during his reign in 1890, became a popular symbol of heritage and royalty, with inscriptions from both King Rama V and King Rama VII.

== Features ==
Phraya Nakhon Cave is divided into two chambers. The first chamber houses the Kuha Karuhas Pavilion. The second, lesser-visited chamber, features natural formations of stalactites and stalagmites.

One of the aspects that adds historical significance to Phraya Nakhon Cave is the presence of the initials of King Rama V and King Rama VII engraved on the cave walls.

=== Kuha Karuhas Pavilion ===
The Kuha Karuhas Pavilion is a four-gabled pavilion built during the reign of King Rama V in 1890. The Kuha Karuhas Pavilion is considered a masterpiece of traditional Thai craftsmanship. Built by artisans from Bangkok, it commemorates King Rama V's historic visit to the site. The pavilion's simplicity is elevated by its distinctive roof, a hallmark of Thai royal architecture, and decorated with red and gold. It is located beneath a natural skylight. At certain times of the day, sunlight filters through the cave's ceiling, illuminating the pavilion. The effect makes it one of Thailand's most-photographed landmarks. The Kuha Karuhas Pavilion is featured in the emblem of Prachuap Khiri Khan province.

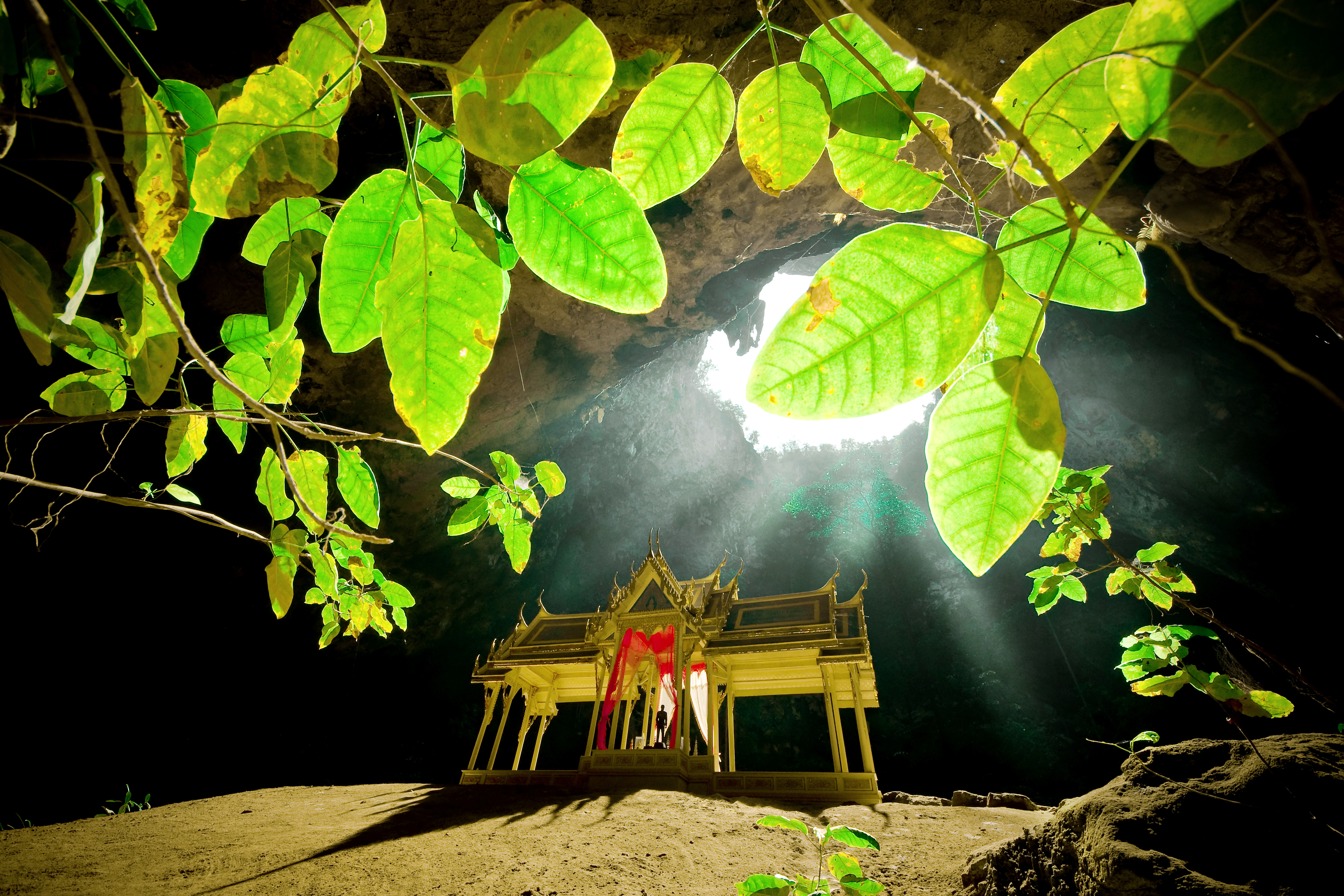
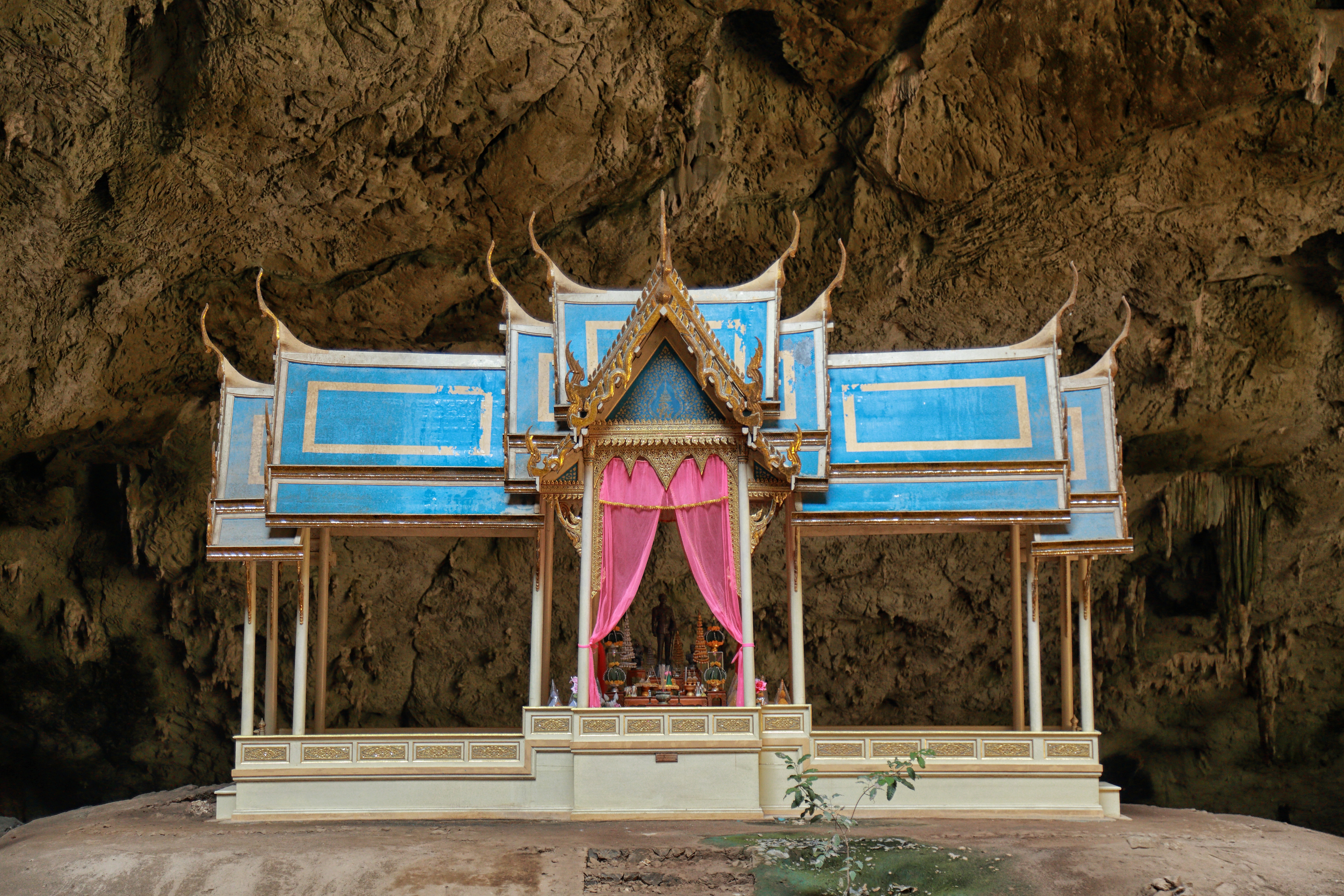
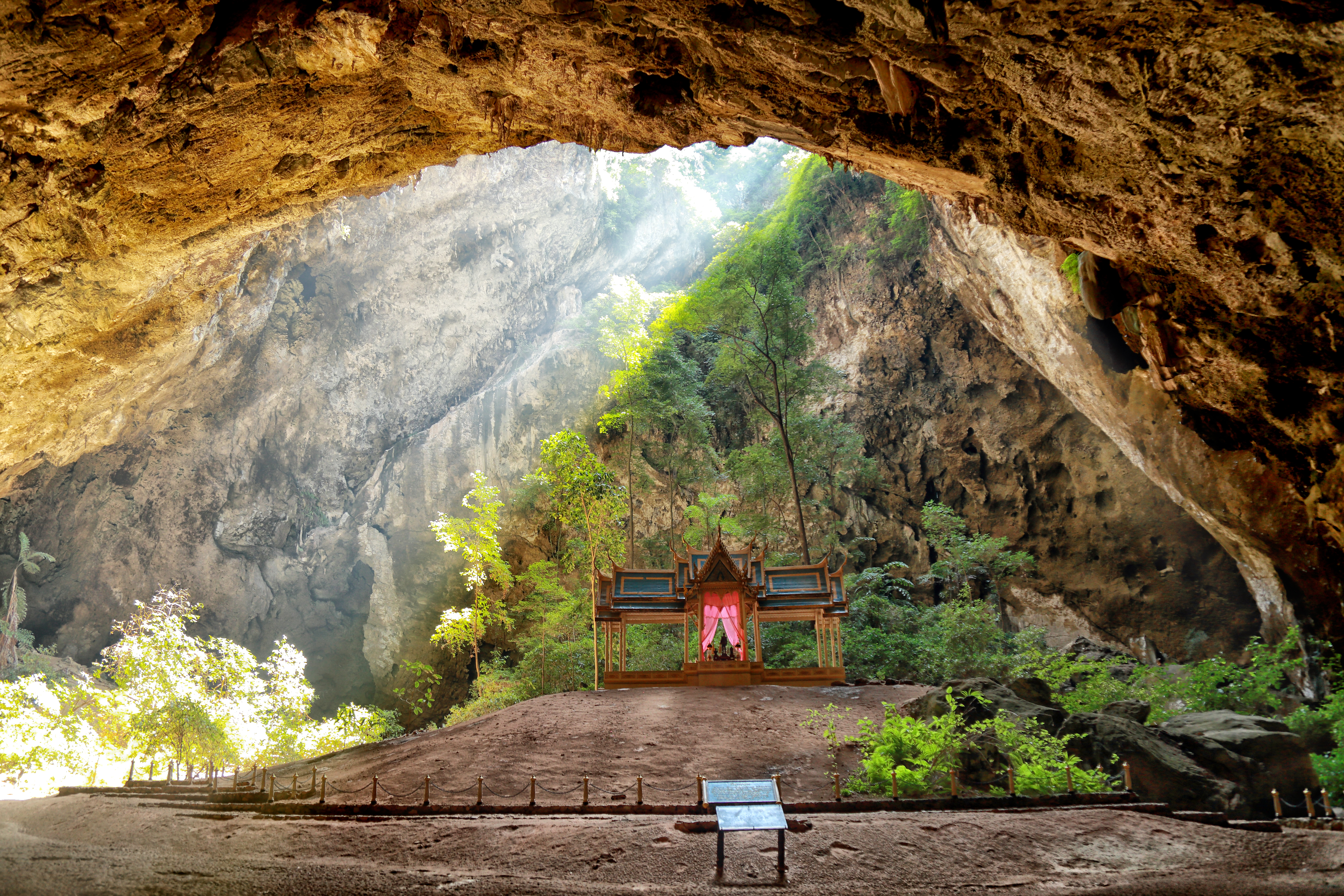
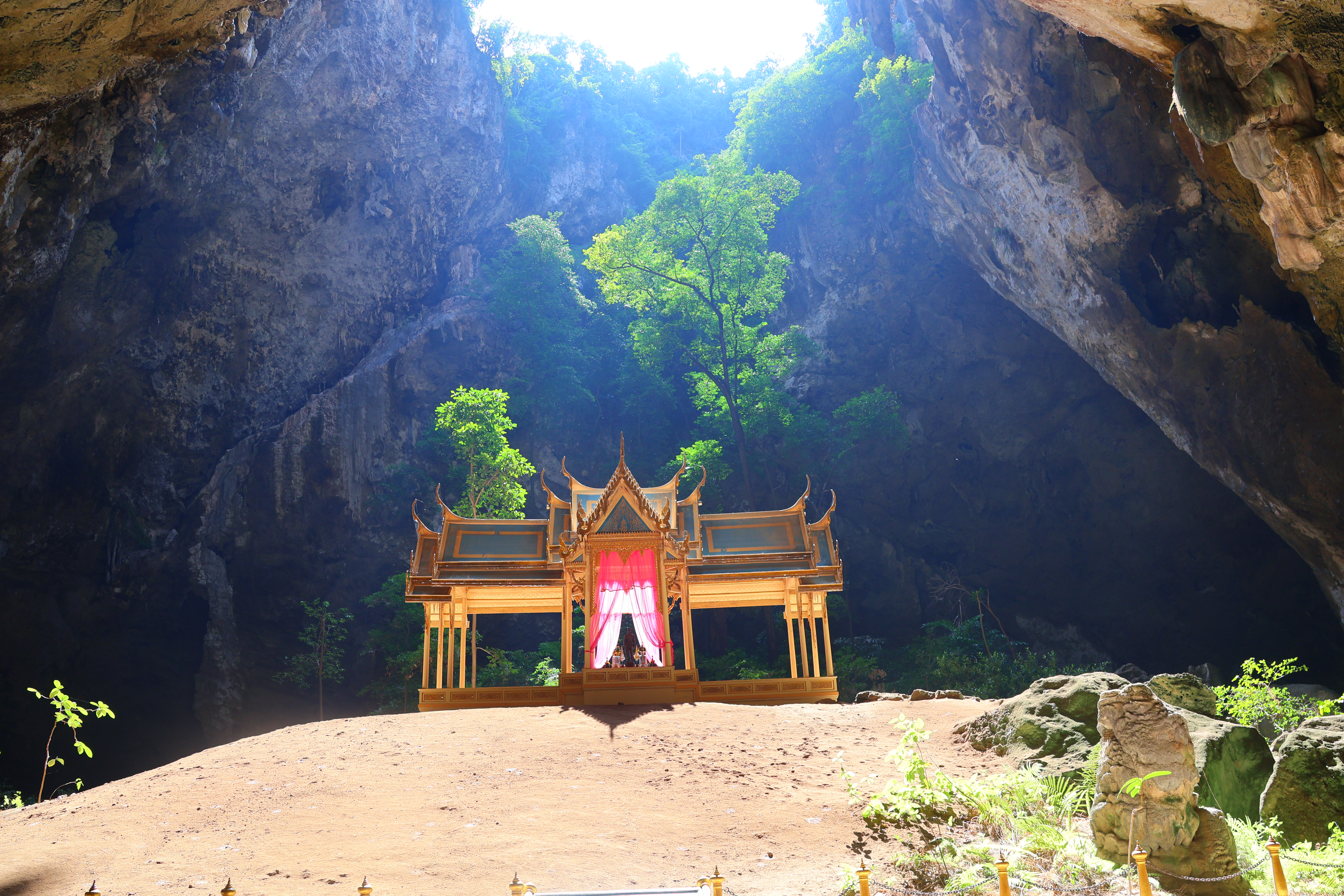
