= Nong Khang railway station =

Railway station in Sila Loi, Thailand

Nong Khang หนองคาง
- Station in 2025

General information
- Location: Mu 3 (Ban Nong Khang), Sila Loi Subdistrict, Sam Roi Yot District, Prachuap Khiri Khan
- Owner: State Railway of Thailand
- Line: Southern Line
- Platforms: 2
- Tracks: 2

Other information
- Station code: อค.

History
- Opened: 1 June 1914

Services
Preceding station	State Railway of Thailand	Following station
Huai Khwang Halt towards Hua Lamphong or Krung Thep Aphiwat	Southern Line	Sam Roi Yot towards Su-ngai Kolok
Location

Nong Khang railway station (Thai: สถานีหนองคาง) is a railway station located in Sila Loi Subdistrict, Sam Roi Yot District, Prachuap Khiri Khan. It is a class 3 railway station located 246.945 km (153.4 mi) from Thon Buri railway station.

The station opened on 1 June 1914 as part of the Southern Line extension from Wang Phong to Prachuap Khiri Khan. The station was rebuilt with elevated platforms in 2022 as part of the double-track section from Nakhon Pathom to Chumphon.

== Train services ==
- Ordinary 251/252 Thon Buri - Prachuap Khiri Khan - Thon Buri
- Ordinary 254/255 Lang Suan - Thon Buri - Lang Suan

== Gallery ==
Renovated station building
