= Hin Lek Fai, Hua Hin =

Hin Lek Fai หินเหล็กไฟ
- Tambon
- Etymology: "Flintstone"
- Interactive map of Hin Lek Fai
- Coordinates: 12°37′47.9″N 99°49′10.8″E
- Country: Thailand
- Province: Prachuap Khiri Khan
- District: Hua Hin
- Named for: Hin Lek Fai Hill

Government
  - Type: Subdistrict Administrative Organization (SAO)

Area
  - Total: 95 km^{2} (37 sq mi)

Population (2005)
  - Total: 8,634
  - Density: 90.88/km^{2} (235.4/sq mi)
- Time zone: UTC+7 (ICT)
- Postcode: 77110
- Area code: (+66) 02
- Geocode: 770703
- Website: https://www.facebook.com/Hinlekfaihh/

Hin Lek Fai (Thai: หินเหล็กไฟ) is a tambon (subdistrict) of Hua Hin district, Prachuap Khiri Khan province, western Thailand.

== History ==
The area is named after a local hill "Khao Hin Lek Fai" (เขาหินเหล็กไฟ, "flintstone hill") (Note: The hill is actually located in the area of neighbouring Hua Hin.). The hill is a scenic viewpoint of Hua Hin, it is also known locally as "Radar Hill". It is 3 km (1.9 mi) west of downtown Hua Hin.

The entire town of Hua Hin can be viewed from the summit of Takiab Hill which forms the boundary between Hua Hin and Suan Son Pradiphat Beaches and Cha-am in the distance.

The subdistrict was established in 1951 as "Khao Hin Lek Fai" and renamed "Hin Lek Fai" in 1972.

== Geography ==
Lying approximately 7.7 km (4.78 miles) directly west of Hua Hin town, most of the area is a plateau with a sandy soil type and is the highest point in Prachuap Khiri Khan province. From the north clockwise the neighbouring subdistricts are Rai Mai Phatthana (which belongs to the Cha-am district of Phetchaburi province) and Hua Hin, Thap Tai, and Nongphlab, which are in Hua Hin district.

== Administration ==
The entire area is under the administration of Subdistrict Administrative Organization (SAO) Hin Lek Fai.
