= Nong Kae railway station =

Railway station in Nong Kae, Thailand

Nong Kae หนองแก
- Station in 2023

General information
- Location: Takiap Road, Nong Kae Subdistrict, Hua Hin District, Prachuap Khiri Khan
- Owner: State Railway of Thailand
- Line: Southern Line
- Platforms: 2
- Tracks: 2

Other information
- Station code: นอ.

History
- Opened: 1 January 1914

Services
| Preceding station | State Railway of Thailand | Following station |
|---|---|---|
| Hua Hin towards Hua Lamphong or Krung Thep Aphiwat | Southern Line | Suan Son Pradiphat towards Su-ngai Kolok |
Location

Nong Kae railway station (Thai: สถานีหนองแก) is a railway station located in Nong Kae Subdistrict, Hua Hin District, Prachuap Khiri Khan. It is a class 3 railway station located 216.963 km (134.8 mi) from Thon Buri railway station.

== History ==
The station opened on 1 January 1914 as part of the Southern Line extension from Hua Hin to Wang Phong. The station was rebuilt with elevated platforms in 2023 as part of the double-track section from Nakhon Pathom to Chumphon.

=== 2007 train collision ===
On 14 January 2007, Rapid No. 178 (operated by GEK No.4035) running from Lang Suan to Thon Buri collided with Special Express No. 39/41 running from Bangkok to Surat Thani/Yala (coupled together), which was waiting on the passing loop for Rapid No.178 to pass. The accident occurred at 02:30 am, and since the trains collided head-on, this caused 2 deaths: the train driver and the train mechanic. Many were injured and were sent to Hua Hin Hospital afterwards.

== Gallery ==
Renovated station building
