= Pran Buri railway station =

Railway station in Pran Buri, Thailand

Pran Buri ปราณบุรี
- Station in 2025

General information
- Location: Ratbamrung Road, Pran Buri Subdistrict, Pran Buri District, Prachuap Khiri Khan
- Owner: State Railway of Thailand
- Line: Southern Line
- Platforms: 2
- Tracks: 3

Other information
- Station code: ปน.

History
- Opened: 1 June 1914
- Former names: Pran

Services
Preceding station	State Railway of Thailand	Following station
Wang Phong towards Hua Lamphong or Krung Thep Aphiwat	Southern Line	Huai Khwang Halt towards Su-ngai Kolok
Location

Pran Buri railway station (Thai: สถานีปราณบุรี) is a railway station in Pran Buri Sub-district, Pran Buri District, Prachuap Khiri Khan Province. The station is a class 3 railway station, 235.85 km (146.6 mi) from Thon Buri railway station.

== History ==
The station opened on 1 June 1914 as part of the Southern Line extension from Wang Phong to Prachuap Khiri Khan. The station was simply called Pran (Thai: ปราณ) before changing to Pran Buri after 1938.

The station was rebuilt in 2022 as part of the double-track section from Nakhon Pathom to Chumphon. A new station building and elevated platforms were built.

Despite being closer to the district center, most trains stopped at Wang Phong station instead of Pran Buri.

== Services ==
For Express and Rapid services, see Wang Phong station.

- Rapid 169/170 Krung Thep Aphiwat - Yala - Krung Thep Aphiwat
- Ordinary 251/252 Thon Buri - Prachuap Khiri Khan - Thon Buri
- Ordinary 254/255 Lang Suan - Thon Buri - Lang Suan
