= Khao Tao railway station =

Railway station in Nong Kae, Thailand

Khao Tao เขาเต่า
- Station in 2025

General information
- Location: Sathani Road, Nong Kae Subdistrict, Hua Hin District, Prachuap Khiri Khan
- Coordinates: 12.4589°N 99.9698°E
- Owner: State Railway of Thailand
- Line: Southern Line
- Platforms: 2
- Tracks: 2

Other information
- Station code: ขต.

History
- Opened: 1 January 1914

Services
Preceding station	State Railway of Thailand	Following station
Suan Son Pradiphat towards Hua Lamphong or Krung Thep Aphiwat	Southern Line	Wang Phong towards Su-ngai Kolok
Location

Khao Tao railway station (Thai: สถานีเขาเต่า) is a railway station located in Nong Kae Subdistrict, Hua Hin District, Prachuap Khiri Khan. It is a class 3 railway station located 225.402 km (140.1 mi) from Thon Buri railway station.

== History ==
The station opened on 1 January 1914 as part of the Southern Line extension from Hua Hin to Wang Phong. The station was rebuilt with elevated platforms in 2023 as part of the double-track section from Nakhon Pathom to Chumphon.

=== 2009 train derailment ===
On 5 October 2009, at 04:20 am, Express No. 84 (operated by GEA No.4544), running from Trang to Bangkok, derailed at Khao Tao Railway Station when it was entering a passing loop at 105 km/h. It was believed to have been caused by the driver falling asleep on duty. This was due to the fact that the train was scheduled to stop at the passing loop of Wang Phong, the previous station. However, the train went past a red light into the Wang Phong-Khao Tao section. At Khao Tao, a freight train was stopped outside of the station. In order to avoid a head-on collision, the express had to be switched to the passing loop at Khao Tao. The express went beyond the speed limit and thus causing 6 carriages to derail. The accident caused 7 deaths and 88 injuries, at an estimated total of about 230 million baht in losses. Train services on the Southern Line were suspended for the rest of the day. The accident was considered one of the worst rail accidents throughout the railway's history.
