= Suan Son Pradiphat railway station =

Railway station in Nong Kae, Thailand

Suan Son Pradiphat สวนสนประดิพัทธ์
- Station in 2025

General information
- Location: Suan Son Pradiphat Army Rehabilitation Centre, Nong Kae Subdistrict, Hua Hin District, Prachuap Khiri Khan
- Coordinates: 12.5118°N 99.9721°E
- Owner: State Railway of Thailand
- Line: Southern Line (Thailand)
- Platforms: 3
- Tracks: 3

Other information
- Station code: สป.

History
- Rebuilt: 2023

Services
| Preceding station | State Railway of Thailand | Following station |
|---|---|---|
| Nong Kae towards Hua Lamphong or Krung Thep Aphiwat | Southern Line | Khao Tao towards Su-ngai Kolok |
Location

Suan Son Pradiphat railway station (Thai: สถานีสวนสนประดิพัทธ์) is a railway station located in Nong Kae Subdistrict, Hua Hin District, Prachuap Khiri Khan Province. It lies 221.03 km (137.3 mi) from Thon Buri Railway Station and serves Suan Son Pradiphat Beach as well as the nearby Rajabhakti Park.

== History ==
The station was originally opened as a railway halt located inside Suan Son Pradiphat Army Rehabilitation Centre. The halt was upgraded to a staffed station on December 11, 2023, following the completion of the double-track railway section.

Originally, the halt served as a terminus for special excursion train (No.911/912). But since 2023, Ordinary No.261/262 has extended its service from Hua Hin to this station.

Nearby, Thailand's first automatic level crossing, inaugurated on August 7, 2010, by then Prime Minister Abhisit Vejjajiva. The level crossing was demolished after the completion of the double-track section in 2023.

== Services ==
- Ordinary 251/252 Thon Buri - Prachuap Khiri Khan - Thon Buri
- Ordinary 254/255 Lang Suan - Thon Buri - Lang Suan
- Ordinary 261/262 Bangkok - Suan Son Pradiphat - Bangkok
- Excursion 911/912 Bangkok - Suan Son Pradiphat - Bangkok (weekends only)

== Gallery ==
The original railway halt in 2009

The original railway halt, looking towards the level-crossing.

Temporary railway halt, now abandoned.

The first automatic level-crossing in Thailand, featuring a timer.
