= Khlong Kui =

River in southern Thailand

Coordinates: 12°02′N 99°54′E

The Khlong Kui (Thai: คลองกุย, pronounced [kʰlɔ̄ːŋ kūj]) is a river in Thailand.

== Geography ==
Khlong Kui drains into the Gulf of Thailand from the Malay Peninsula in Thailand. It flows through Ban Pong Kasang and Ban Thung Faek, Kui Buri District, Prachuap Khiri Khan Province.
