= Pran Buri Forest Park =

Protected area in Thailand

- วนอุทยานปราณบุรี
- Location within Thailand
- Location: Thailand
- Nearest city: Prachuap Khiri Khan
- Coordinates: 12°25′0″N 99°59′03″E
- Area: 3.17 km^{2} (1.22 mi^{2})
- Established: 30 Sept 1982

The Pran Buri Forest Park (Thai: วนอุทยานปราณบุรี) is a protected area in Thailand. It is at the mouth of the Pran Buri River to the Gulf of Thailand in Pran Buri District, Prachuap Khiri Khan Province.

Pran Buri Forest Park was founded either in 1974 or on 30 September 1982 by the Forestry Department, after Queen Sirikit visited Pak Nam Pran Buri Village in Pran Buri and was inspired to support the growing of more trees along the coastline. This project developed 1,984 rai of Khlong Kao and Khlong Doi forests, consisting of mangrove forests, mixed deciduous forests, and coastal plains.

The park protects the mangrove forest of the Khlong Kao-Khlong Kop National Reserve Forest. It covers 3.17 square kilometres (1.22 mi^{2}).
