= Hua Hin district =

Hua Hin หัวหิน
- District
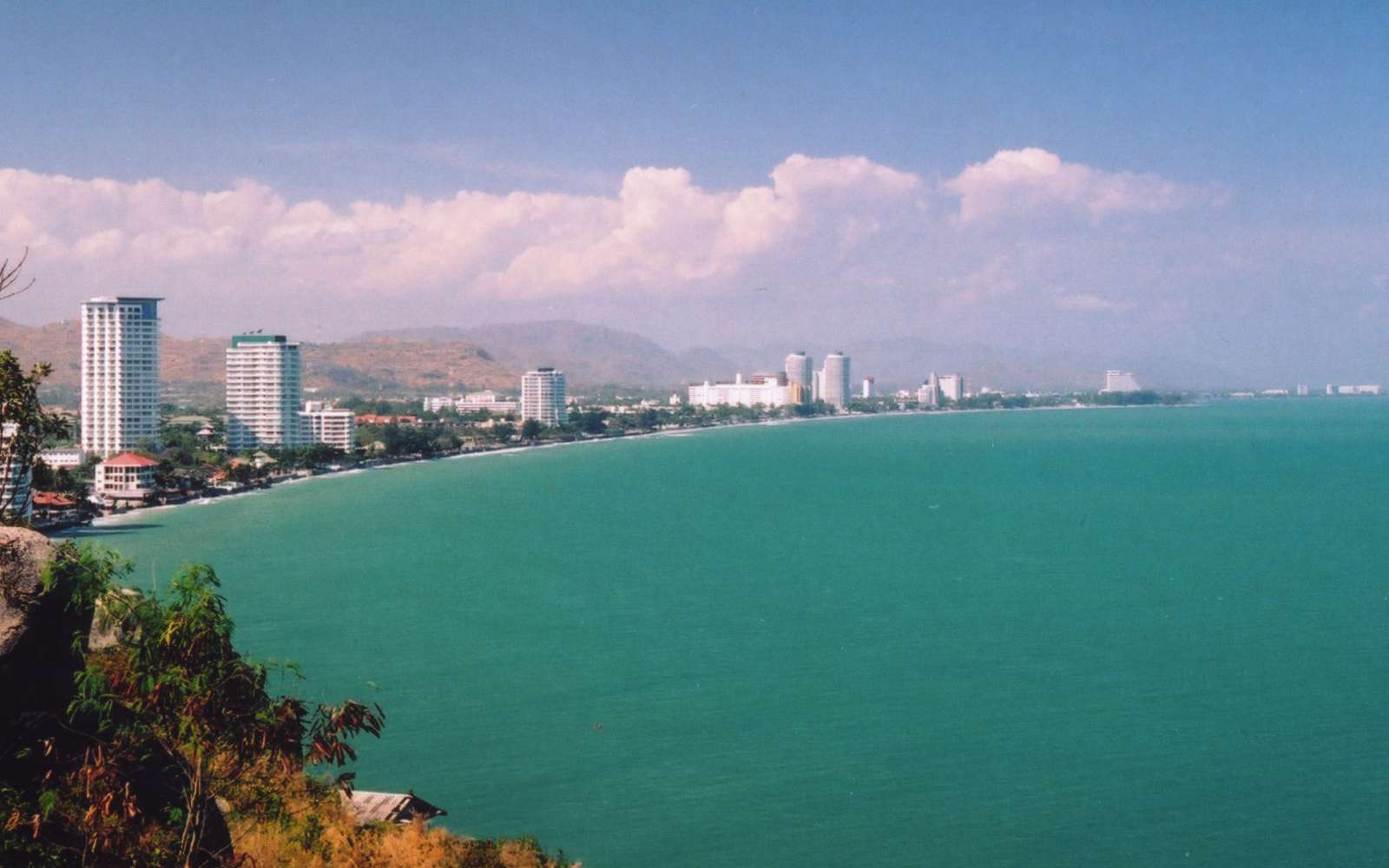
- City of Hua Hin

- District location in Prachuap Khiri Khan province
- Coordinates: 12°34′7″N 99°57′28″E
- Country: Thailand
- Province: Prachuap Khiri Khan

Area
  - Total: 838.9 km^{2} (323.9 sq mi)

Population (January 2025)
  - Total: 126,355
  - Density: 150.62/km^{2} (390.1/sq mi)
- Time zone: UTC+7 (ICT)
- Postal code: 77110
- Geocode: 7707

Hua Hin (Thai: หัวหิน, IPA: [hǔə hǐn]) is one of eight districts (amphoe) of Prachuap Khiri Khan province in the northern part of the Malay Peninsula in Thailand. Its seat of government, also named Hua Hin, is a beach resort town. The district's population was estimated at 65,983 in December 2019 by the Bureau of Registration Administration in an area of 911 km^{2} (352 sq mi). By road, it is 199 km (124 mi) south-southwest of Bangkok.

Hua Hin district sits at the center of the "Thailand Riviera" coastal development corridor, which spans from Phetchaburi to Chumphon, and forms the core of the contiguous Cha-am–Hua Hin urban area.

== History ==
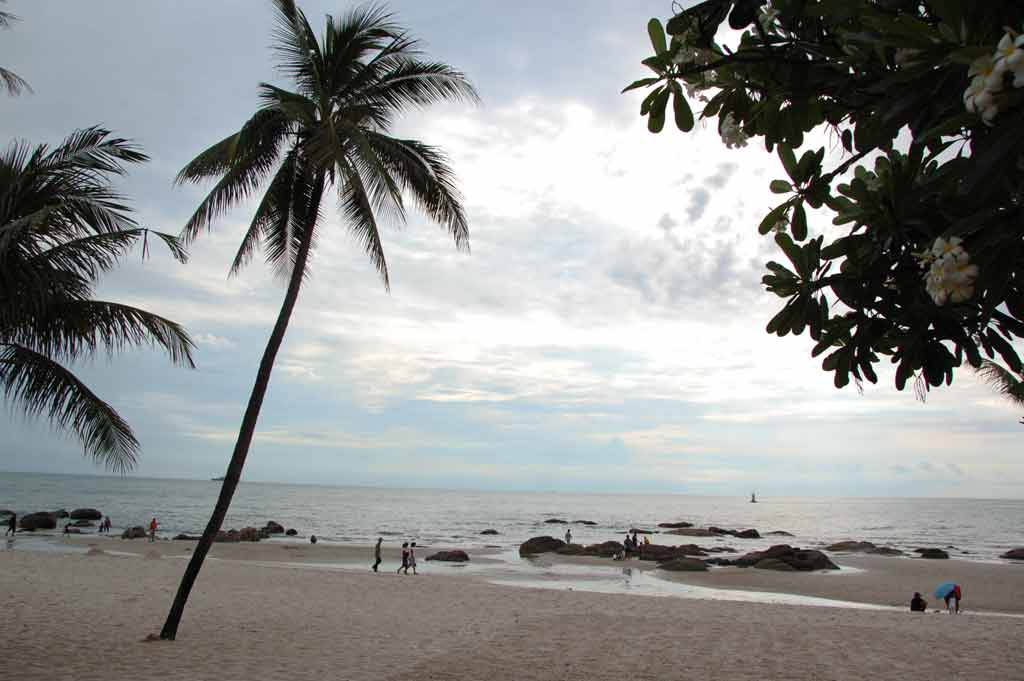
Hua Hin Beach

In 1834, before the name Hua Hin was coined, some agricultural areas of Phetchaburi province were hit by severe drought. A group of farmers moved south until they found a small village that had bright white sand and a row of rocks along the beach. They settled there and gave it the name Samore Riang (Samo Riang), which means 'rows of rocks'.

In 1921 the director of the state railway, Prince Purachatra, built the Railway Hotel close to the beach. Prince Krom Phra Naresworarit was the first member of the royal family to build a group of palaces at Ban Laem Hin, called Sukaves, and gave the beach next to his palace the name "Hua Hin". King Prajadhipok (Rama VII) liked the place so much that he built a summer palace there which was later named Klai Kang Won ('far from worries'). From 2004 until 2006 it was the full-time residence of King Bhumibol Adulyadej (Rama IX), until health issues forced him to return to Siriraj Hospital in Bangkok, where medical facilities and physicians were closer at hand.

In 1932 Hua Hin was part of Pran Buri district as a minor district (king amphoe). In 1949 Hua Hin became a separate district of Prachuap Khiri Khan. After the building of Thailand's southern railway connected the district with Bangkok along with various destinations en route, Hua Hin became the first and most popular beach resort in the country. Over the five-year period from 2014 to 2019, the number of Thai and foreign visitors to Hua Hin has risen six percent per year.

In August 2016, there were four bomb blasts in Hua Hin over a period of 24 hours. One person died, 20 others were injured. In the aftermath of the bombing 90 security cameras were installed and are monitored by the Tourist Police. Another 60 cameras are monitored by the municipal office. There are plans to install several hundred more.

== Climate ==
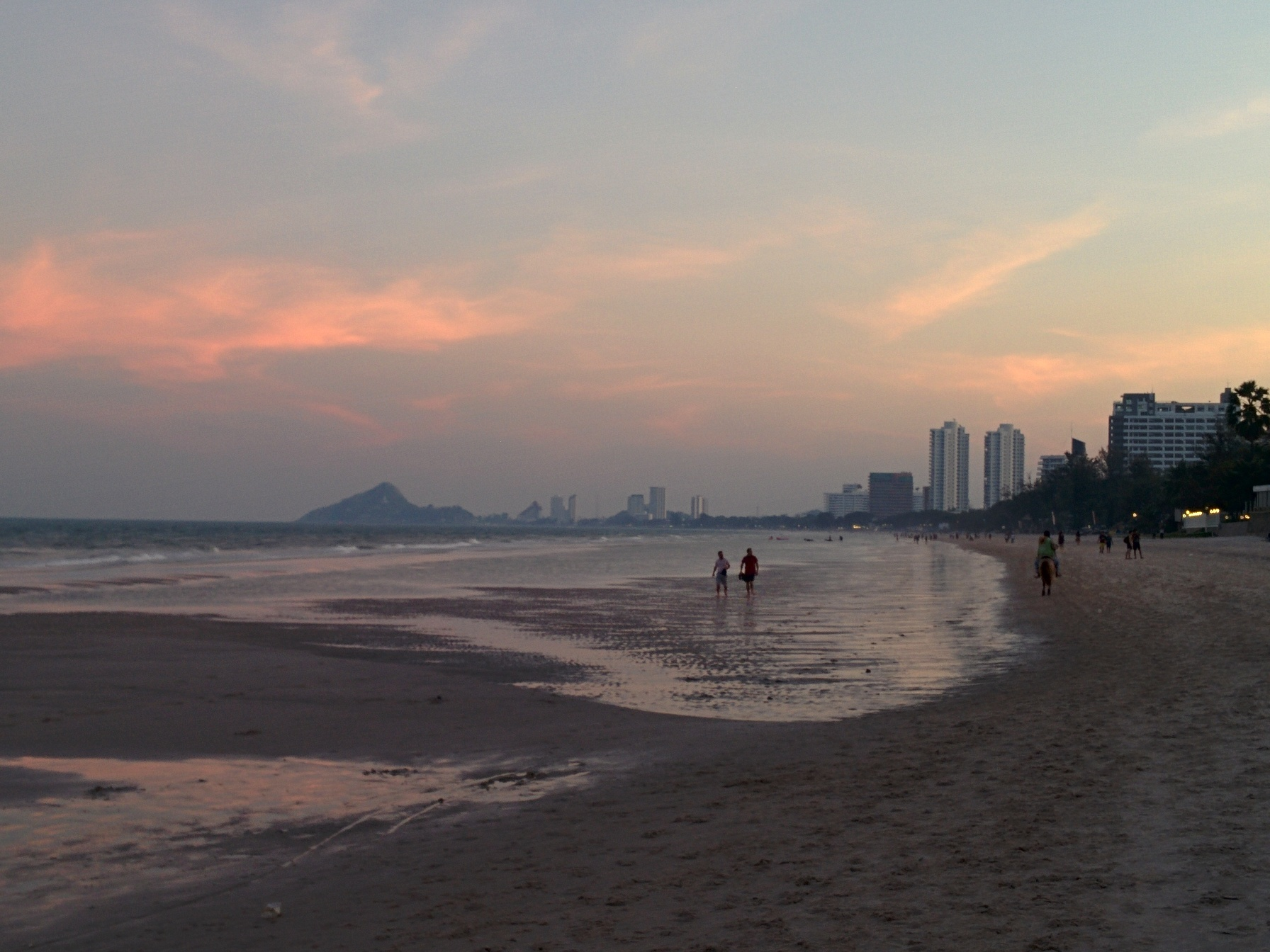
Hua Hin Beach

Hua Hin has a tropical savanna climate (Köppen climate classification Aw). Historically, temperatures are very warm to hot throughout the year, with only small variations. The year begins with the dry season (December–April), before the monsoon arrives in May. Rains ease somewhat from June to August before the heaviest rains begin in September and continue through November.

Climate data for Hua Hin (1991–2020, extremes 1954-present)
Month	Jan	Feb	Mar	Apr	May	Jun	Jul	Aug	Sep	Oct	Nov	Dec	Year
Record high °C (°F)	33.4 (92.1)	36.5 (97.7)	36.2 (97.2)	38.3 (100.9)	38.7 (101.7)	37.5 (99.5)	38.7 (101.7)	37.8 (100.0)	38.0 (100.4)	37.3 (99.1)	34.0 (93.2)	34.5 (94.1)	38.7 (101.7)
Mean daily maximum °C (°F)	29.9 (85.8)	31.1 (88.0)	32.3 (90.1)	33.4 (92.1)	33.7 (92.7)	33.4 (92.1)	33.0 (91.4)	32.9 (91.2)	32.3 (90.1)	31.0 (87.8)	30.6 (87.1)	29.8 (85.6)	32.0 (89.5)
Daily mean °C (°F)	26.3 (79.3)	27.3 (81.1)	28.5 (83.3)	29.6 (85.3)	29.5 (85.1)	29.2 (84.6)	28.8 (83.8)	28.6 (83.5)	28.2 (82.8)	27.6 (81.7)	27.4 (81.3)	26.4 (79.5)	28.1 (82.6)
Mean daily minimum °C (°F)	22.8 (73.0)	23.6 (74.5)	24.9 (76.8)	26.0 (78.8)	26.3 (79.3)	26.1 (79.0)	25.7 (78.3)	25.6 (78.1)	25.3 (77.5)	24.8 (76.6)	24.5 (76.1)	23.3 (73.9)	24.9 (76.8)
Record low °C (°F)	13.9 (57.0)	15.4 (59.7)	17.8 (64.0)	21.8 (71.2)	22.4 (72.3)	22.2 (72.0)	22.0 (71.6)	21.9 (71.4)	21.2 (70.2)	19.1 (66.4)	17.2 (63.0)	13.9 (57.0)	13.9 (57.0)
Average precipitation mm (inches)	25.0 (0.98)	13.8 (0.54)	50.5 (1.99)	46.5 (1.83)	95.5 (3.76)	82.4 (3.24)	90.2 (3.55)	67.1 (2.64)	129.8 (5.11)	250.4 (9.86)	72.8 (2.87)	11.9 (0.47)	935.9 (36.85)
Average precipitation days (≥ 1.0 mm)	1.3	0.8	2.2	2.7	8.5	9.2	9.7	9.7	10.6	12.7	4.2	1.3	72.9
Average relative humidity (%)	71.4	73.0	73.9	73.3	74.0	73.6	73.6	73.9	77.1	80.2	73.0	67.6	73.7
Average dew point °C (°F)	20.5 (68.9)	21.8 (71.2)	23.2 (73.8)	24.1 (75.4)	24.2 (75.6)	23.7 (74.7)	23.4 (74.1)	23.3 (73.9)	23.6 (74.5)	23.8 (74.8)	22.0 (71.6)	19.7 (67.5)	22.8 (73.0)
Mean monthly sunshine hours	213.9	225.4	248.0	234.4	196.5	141.7	133.7	133.6	143.4	159.8	190.8	200.2	2,221.4
Source: NOAA

== Administration ==
=== Central administration ===
Hua Hin district is divided into seven sub-districts (tambons), which are further subdivided into 63 administrative villages (mubans).

No.	Name	Thai	Villages	Pop.
1.	Hua Hin	หัวหิน	-	44,907
2.	Nong Kae	หนองแก	-	16,552
3.	Hin Lek Fai	หินเหล็กไฟ	16	20,491
4.	Nong Phlap	หนองพลับ	10	11,610
5.	Thap Tai	ทับใต้	14	20,146
6.	Huai Sat Yai	ห้วยสัตว์ใหญ่	11	7,580
7.	Bueng Nakhon	บึงนคร	12	5,069

=== Local administration ===
There is one city (thesaban nakhon) in the district:

- Hua Hin (Thai: เทศบาลนครหัวหิน) consisting of sub-districts Hua Hin and Nong Kae.

There is one sub-district municipality (thesaban tambon) in the district:

- Nong Phlap (Thai: เทศบาลตำบลหนองพลับ) consisting of parts of sub-district Nong Phlap.

There are five sub-district administrative organizations (SAO) in the district:

- Hin Lek Fai (Thai: องค์การบริหารส่วนตำบลหินเหล็กไฟ) consisting of sub-district Hin Lek Fai.
- Nong Phlap (Thai: องค์การบริหารส่วนตำบลหนองพลับ) consisting of parts of sub-district Nong Phlap.
- Thap Tai (Thai: องค์การบริหารส่วนตำบลทับใต้) consisting of sub-district Thap Tai.
- Huai Sat Yai (Thai: องค์การบริหารส่วนตำบลห้วยสัตว์ใหญ่) consisting of sub-district Huai Sat Yai.
- Bueng Nakhon (Thai: องค์การบริหารส่วนตำบลบึงนคร) consisting of sub-district Bueng Nakhon.

== Environment ==
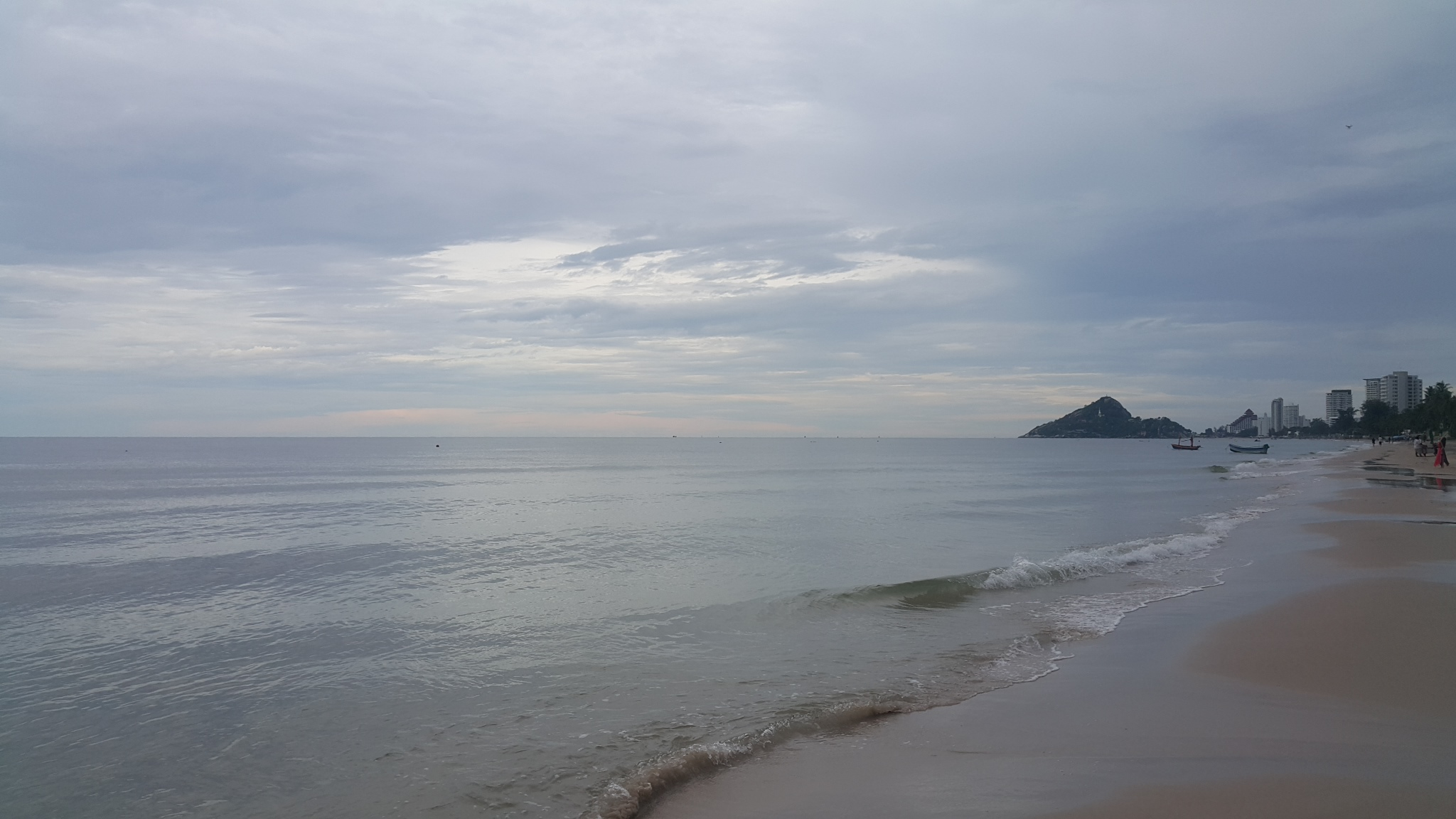
Hua Hin Beach, from Marrakesh Resort

The quality of the waters of the Gulf of Thailand off central Hua Hin were rated " good to fair" in 2016 by the Pollution Control Department.

== Boundaries ==
Hua Hin district is bordered by:

- North: Cha-am district, Phetchaburi province.
- East: Gulf of Thailand
- West: Myanmar (Burma)
- South: Pran Buri district, Prachuap Khiri Khan province.

== Transport ==
Hua Hin is served by road, rail, and sea routes.

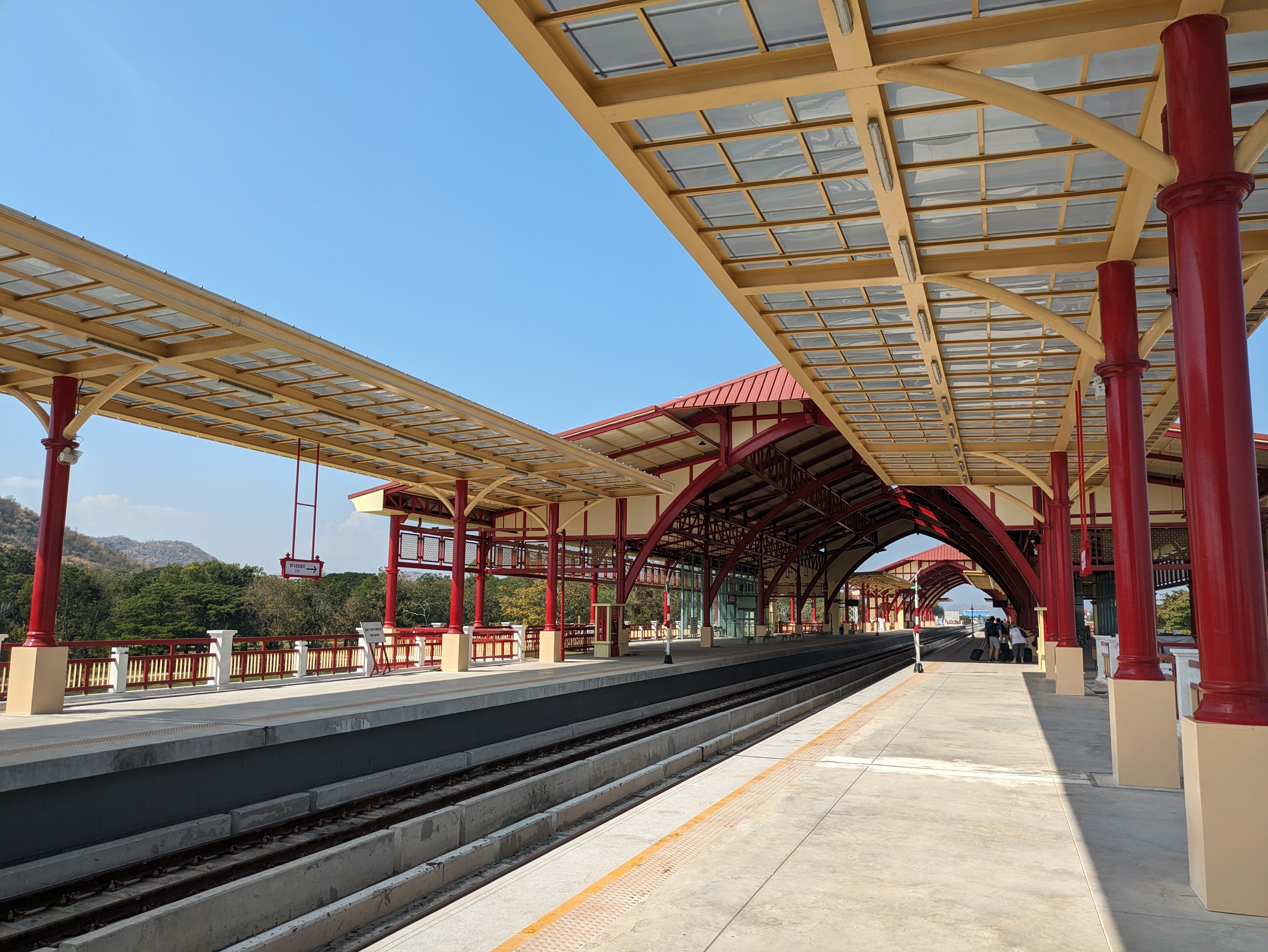
Hua Hin Railway Station

The main station is Hua Hin railway station and it is the northernmost station in the district. Smaller stations are also located in the area including Nong Kae railway station which is closer to Khao Takiap, Suan Son Pradiphat Railway Halt, close to Suan Son Pradiphat Beach and Rajabhakti Park as well as Khao Tao railway station.

As of 2019, work is underway on the construction of double tracks from Bangkok's Bang Sue Central Station to Chumphon. Trains will travel the route at up to 160 kilometres per hour. The new tracks—due to be completed in 2022—will enable trains to travel the Bangkok–Hua Hin segment in "two to three hours" according to a State Railway of Thailand (SRT) spokesman. As a comparison, as of November 2019, SRT's Train 44 travels from Hua Hin to Bangkok's Bangkok Railway Station in three hours and thirty-three minutes (02:22–05:55). Plans for high-speed rail from Bangkok to Surat Thani which would serve Hua Hin en route, have been shelved due to lack of investor interest.

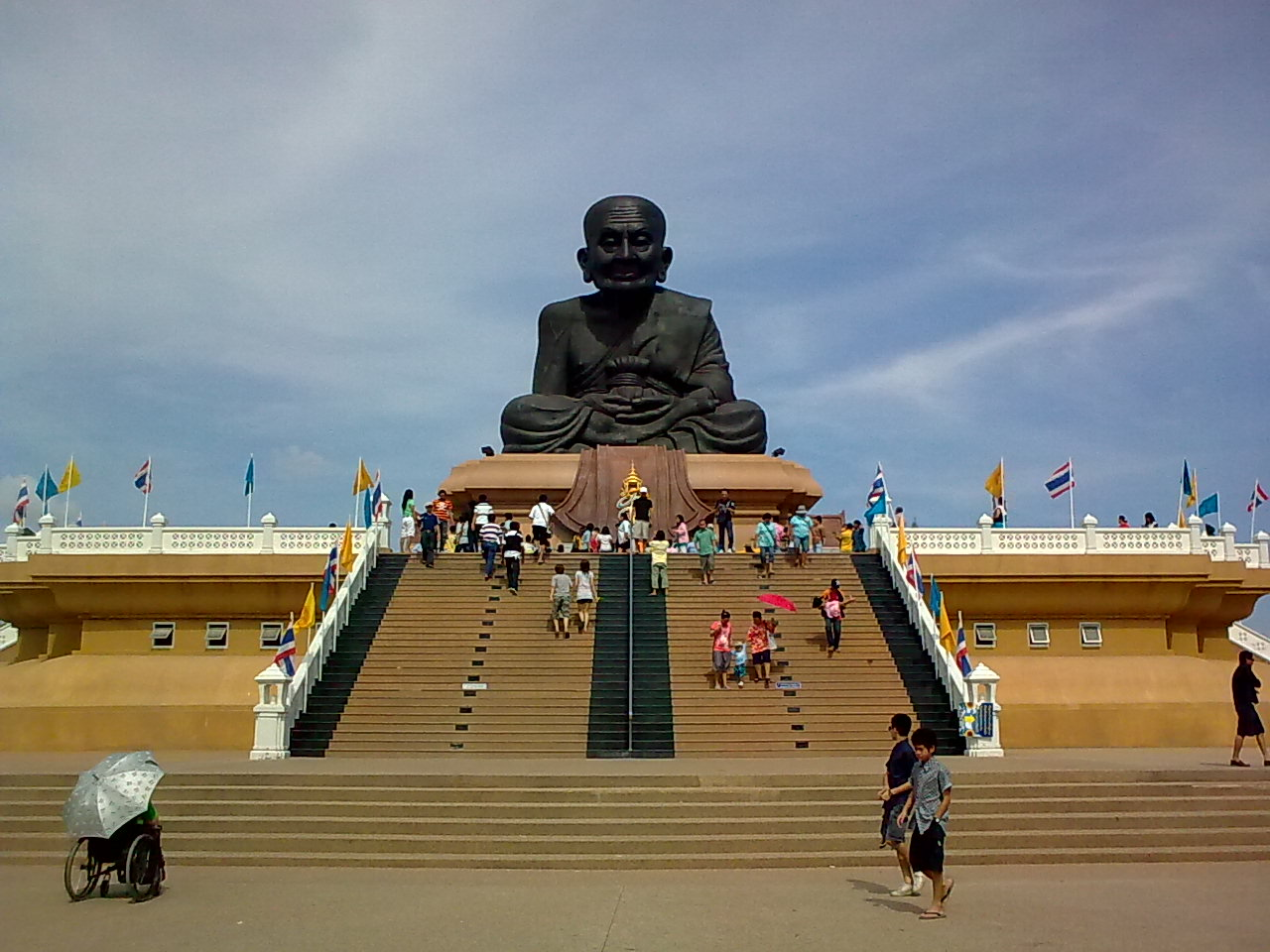
Luang Pu Thuat, Wat Huay Mongkol

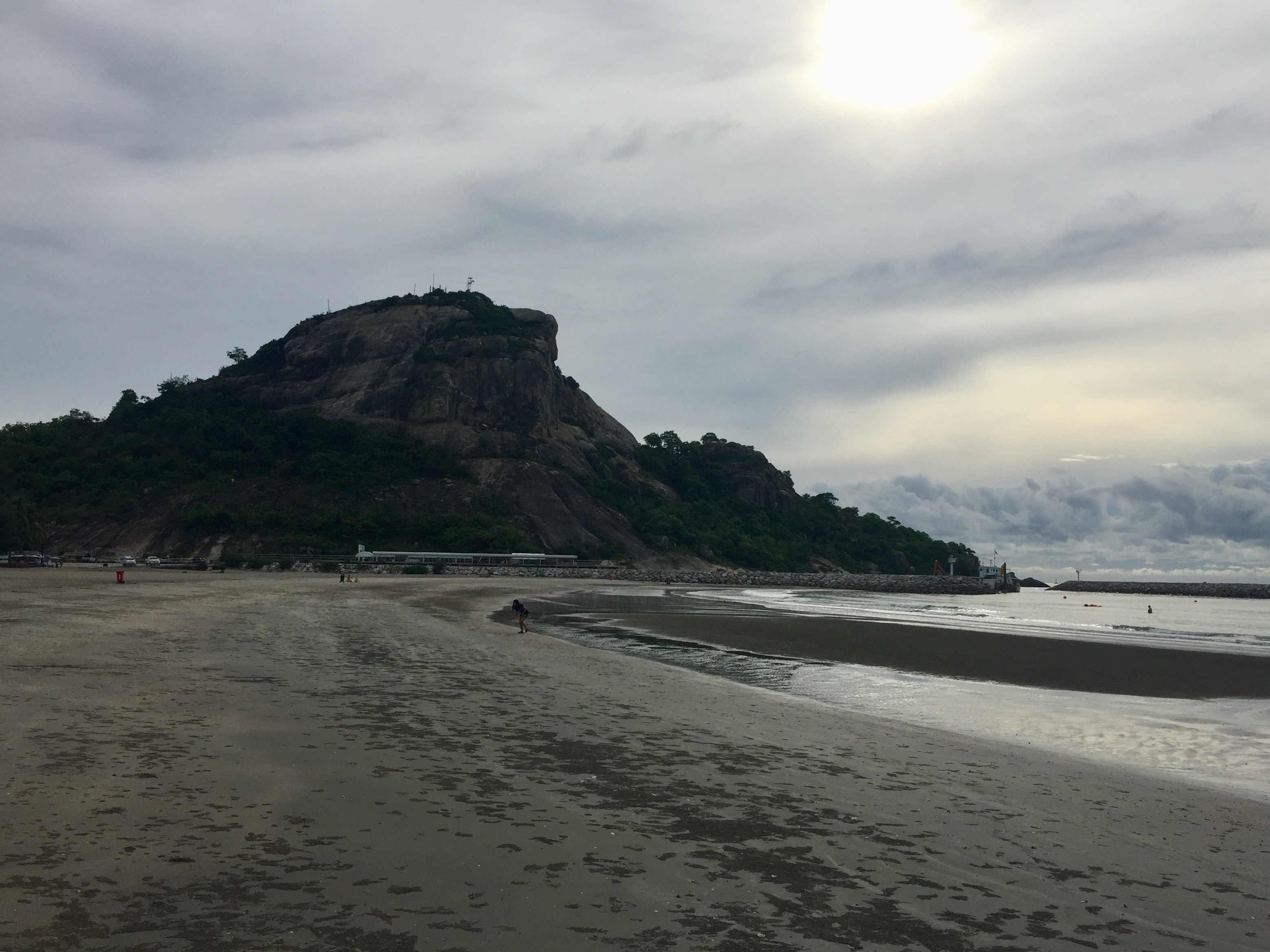
Khao Takiap, at the southern end of Hua Hin Beach separating Hua Hin and Suan Son Pradiphat Beaches

Since 2018, there is no longer daily ferry service between Hua Hin and Pattaya. In November 2018, Hua Hin deputy chief Chareewat Phramanee confirmed the ferry service, suspended due to low tourist numbers during low season, would be up and running again for high season between Hua Hin and Pattaya, a 2.5 hour journey on a catamaran with a maximum capacity of 340.

Hua Hin Airport is in Hua Hin District. AirAsia serves the airport with a direct flight only to Chiang Mai. The other destinations have been discontinued.

In August 2018 the Department of Airports announced that it will spend 3.5 billion baht to upgrade Hua Hin Airport over the next five years. The number of travellers using the airport is expected to increase by tenfold, to three million a year, in that time frame. The upgrade is part of the "Riviera Thailand" and Southern Economic Corridor projects. The work at the airport will take four to five years. It includes enlarging the existing passenger terminal, building a second one, expanding hangar space, and widening the runway from 30 to 45 metres.

== Health ==
Hua Hin is served by Hua Hin Hospital, operated by the Ministry of Public Health. It is the largest hospital in Prachuap Khiri Khan province.

== Education ==
Hua Hin and Cha-am host a number of tertiary education institutions such as Kasetsart University Veterinary Teaching Hospital, Silpakorn University, Suan Dusit Rajabhat (Hospitality) University, and the Petchaburi Technology and Agricultural University. Webster University Thailand had a campus near Hua Hin, but ceased operations on 31 December 2021. The Rajamangala University of Technology also has a campus in the vicinity, the Rattanakosin (Wangklaikangwon Campus).

== See also ==
- Ko Sai (Islands off Hua Hin)
