= Pran Buri River =

River in Thailand

- Native name: แม่น้ำปราณบุรี (Thai)

Location
- Country: Thailand
- Province: Prachuap Khiri Khan

Physical characteristics
- Source
  - location: Kaeng Krachan National Park, Tenasserim Hills
- Mouth: Gulf of Thailand
  - coordinates: 12°24′36″N 99°59′28″E
- Length: 130 km (81 mi)
- Basin size: 2,000 km^{2} (770 sq mi)

Basin features
- Cities: Pran Buri

The Pran Buri River (Thai: แม่น้ำปราณบุรี, RTGS: Maenam Pran Buri, pronounced [mɛ̂ːnáːm prāːn būrīː]) is a river in Prachuap Khiri Khan Province, Thailand, on the Kra Isthmus of the Malay Peninsula. The Pran Buri River originates in the southern part of Kaeng Krachan National Park in the Tenasserim Hills and after 130 kilometres (81 mi) empties into the Gulf of Thailand. The only town along the river course is Pran Buri, the center of the Pran Buri District. The watershed of the Pran Buri River has an area of about 2,000 square kilometres (770 mi^{2}).

The Pran Buri dam was built in 1978, to protect lowlands from flooding as well as to have steady water flow for irrigation. The 42-metre (138 ft) high and 1,500-metre (4,900 ft) wide earthen dam creates an artificial lake, which covers 35.2 square kilometres (13.6 mi^{2}) and has a capacity of 445 million cubic metres (361,000 acre⋅ft).

At the river's estuary at the Gulf of Thailand is Pran Buri Forest Park, covering 3.17 square kilometres (1.22 mi^{2}) of mixed forest and mangrove forest. It was created in 1982.
