= Hua Hin railway station =

Rail station in Thailand

Coordinates: 12.5652640°N 99.9549296°E

Hua Hin หัวหิน
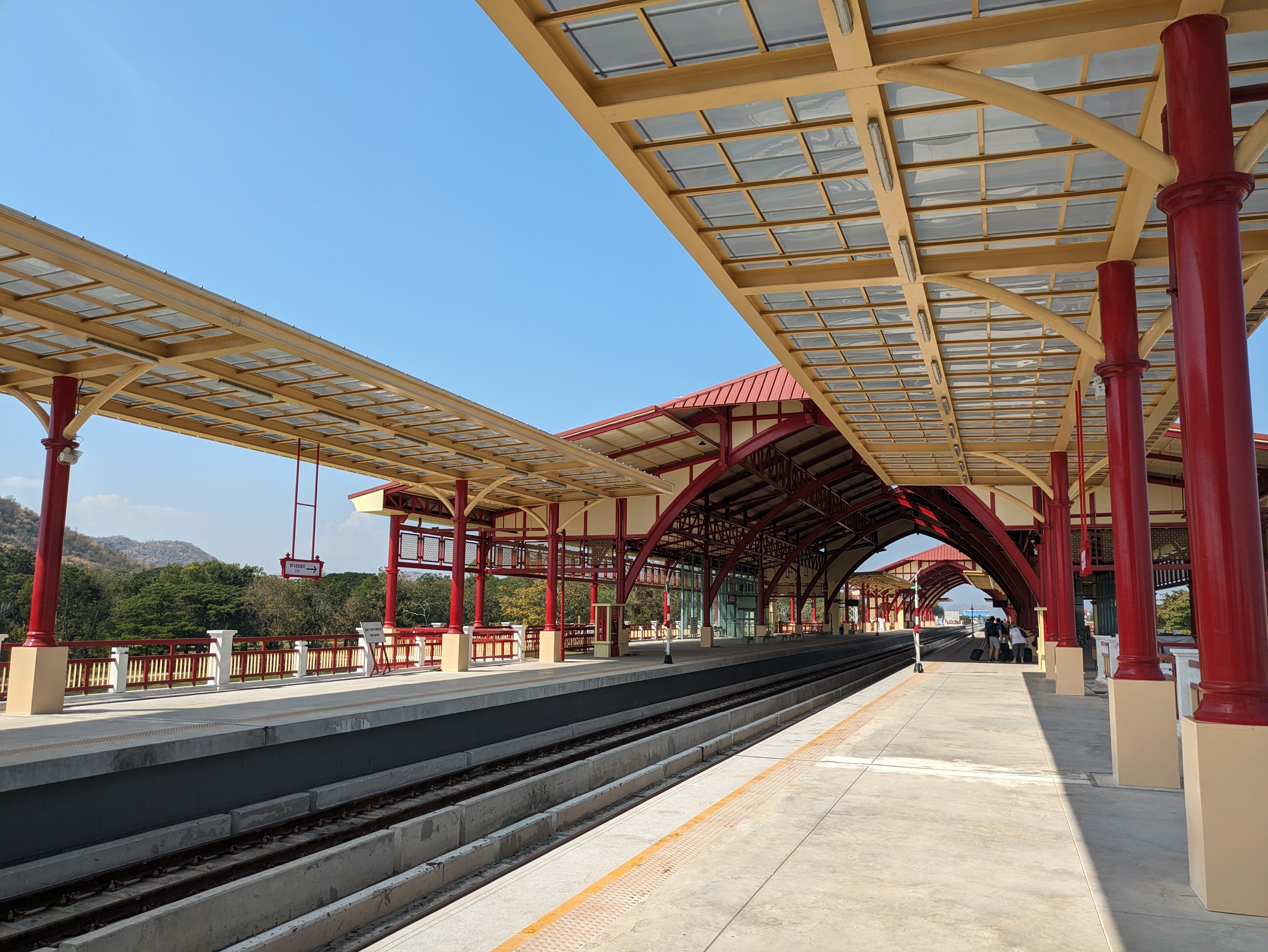
- Platforms of the elevated station

General information
- Location: 44 Prapokklao Road, Hua Hin Subdistrict, Hua Hin District; Prachuap Khiri Khan; Thailand
- Operator: State Railway of Thailand
- Manager: Ministry of Transport
- Line: Su-ngai Kolok Main Line
- Platforms: 2
- Tracks: 2

Construction
- Structure type: Elevated
- Parking: Yes

Other information
- Station code: หห.
- Classification: Class 1

History
- Opened: 25 November 1911; 114 years ago
- Rebuilt: 11 December 2023; 2 years ago

Services
Preceding station	State Railway of Thailand	Following station
Huai Sai Tai towards Hua Lamphong or Krung Thep Aphiwat	Southern Line	Nong Kae towards Su-ngai Kolok
Location

Hua Hin railway station is a train station located in Hua Hin Subdistrict, Hua Hin District, Prachuap Khiri Khan Province, and is located 212.99 kilometres (132.3 mi) from Thon Buri railway station and 850 m (0.5 mi) from the beach. It is a class 1 railway station and the main station of Hua Hin District.

Hua Hin Station has been considered to be the most beautiful and iconic station in Thailand. Therefore, it is popular as a landmark and a photo spot of Hua Hin for visitors. Royal State Railways of Siam no. 305, a 2-8-2 steam locomotive built by Baldwin in 1925, is on display beside the station.

== History ==
The Southern Line third phase between Cha-am Station to Hua Hin opened in November 1911, and the line continued to Wang Phong Station in January 1914. The original station building was built in 1910, and rebuilt in 1926, by Prince Purachatra Jayakara (former commander of the Royal State Railways of Siam) to the current Victorian building today. The design was taken from the planned Siam Rat Museum Expo, intended to be built in 1925 at Lumphini Park, but was never built due to the death of King Vajiravudh and the cancellation of the expo by King Prajadhipok.

In 1967, Colonel Saeng Chulacharit (former minister of the State Railway of Thailand) coordinated the relocation of the Sanam Chandra Palace Railway Pavilion from Sanam Chandra Palace, to Hua Hin and it was renamed to "Phramongkutklao Pavilion". It is one of the main attractions at the station.

Hua Hin station was reconstructed as an elevated station as part of the double-tracking project of the Southern Line. It opened on 11 December 2023. The former station and Phramongkutklao pavilion will be preserved and maintained as a historic building by the Fine Arts Department.

== Station layout ==
U1; Platforms	Side platform, the car door will open on the left side
U1; Platforms	Platform 1	Southern Line toward Su-ngai Kolok
U1; Platforms	Platform 2	Southern Line toward Bangkok (Krung Thep Aphiwat)
U1; Platforms	Side platform, the car door will open on the left side
G Concourse and Street Level	Concourse	Exit 1-4, Passenger Service Center, Ticket Office, Ticket Vending Machine, Shops

== Gallery ==
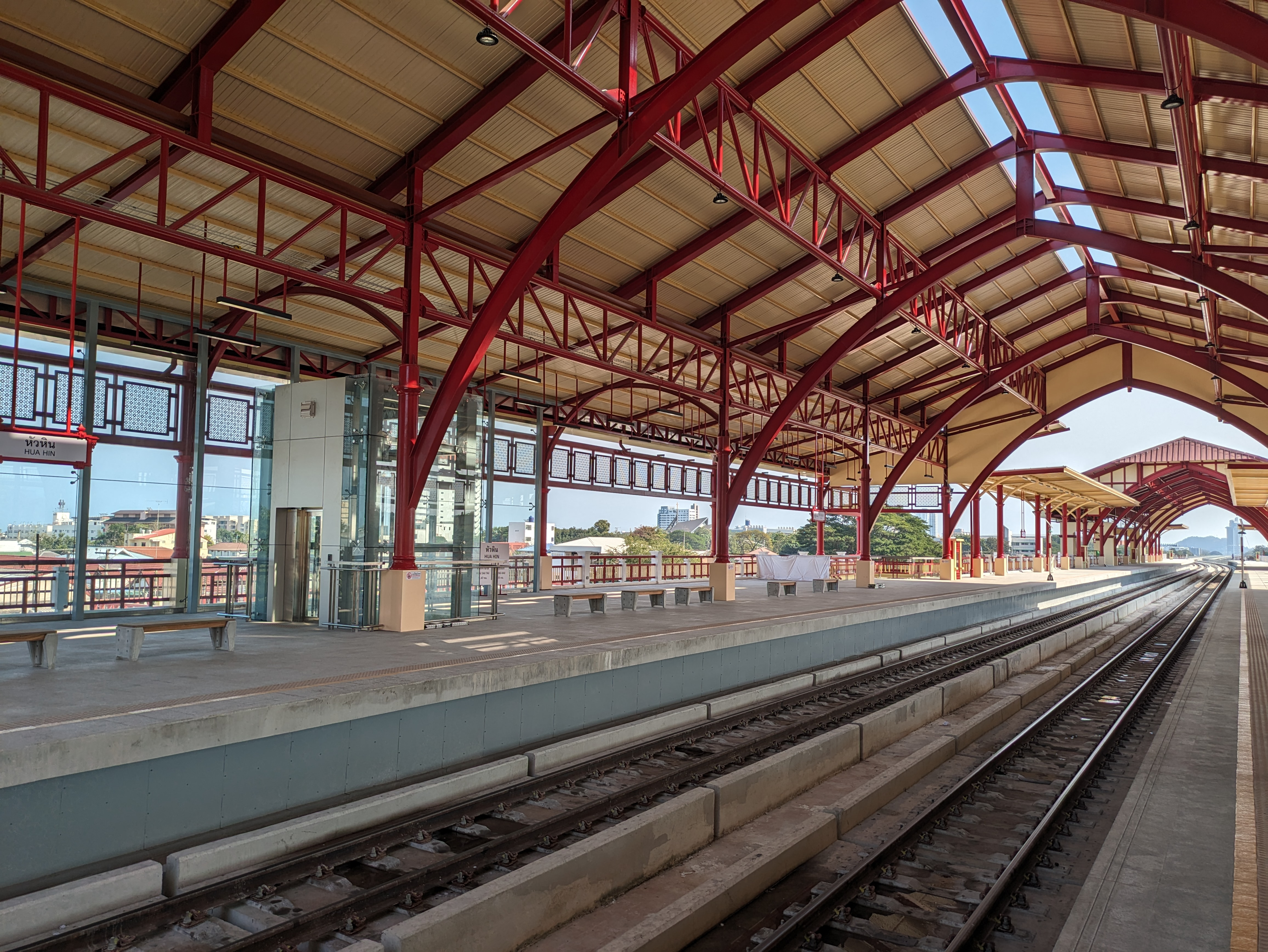
Platforms equipped with elevators

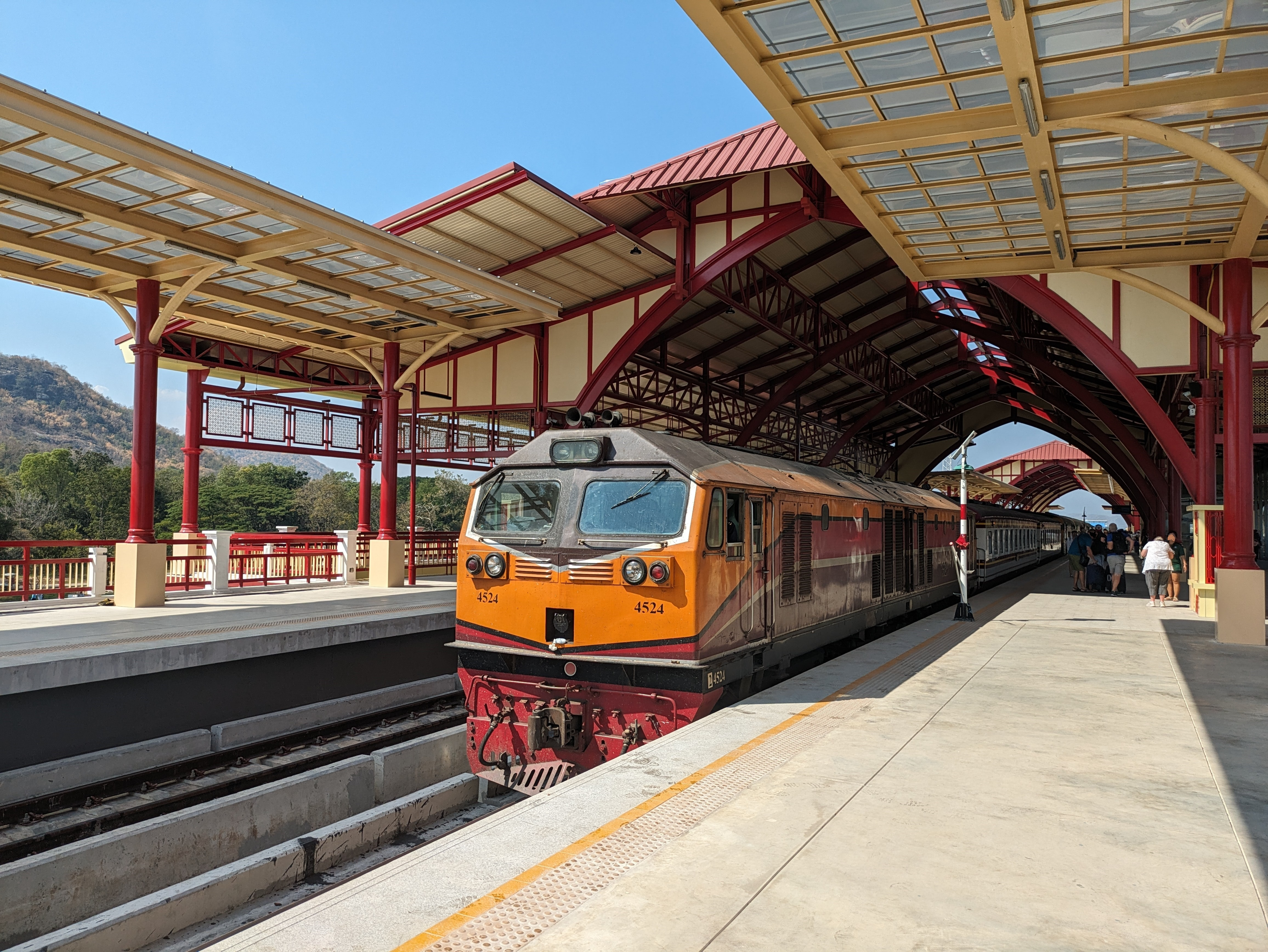
Train at the station

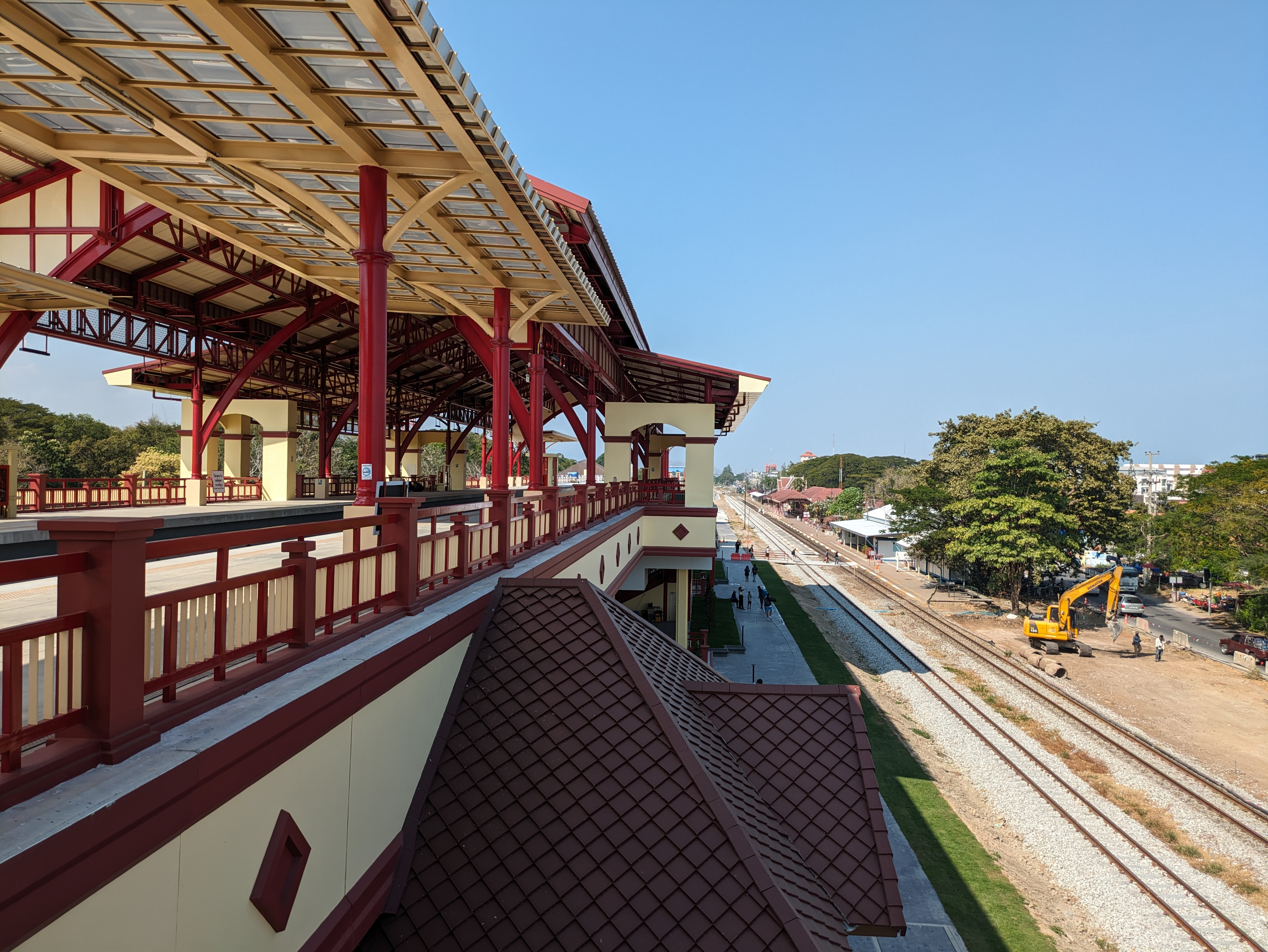
View of the current and former stations

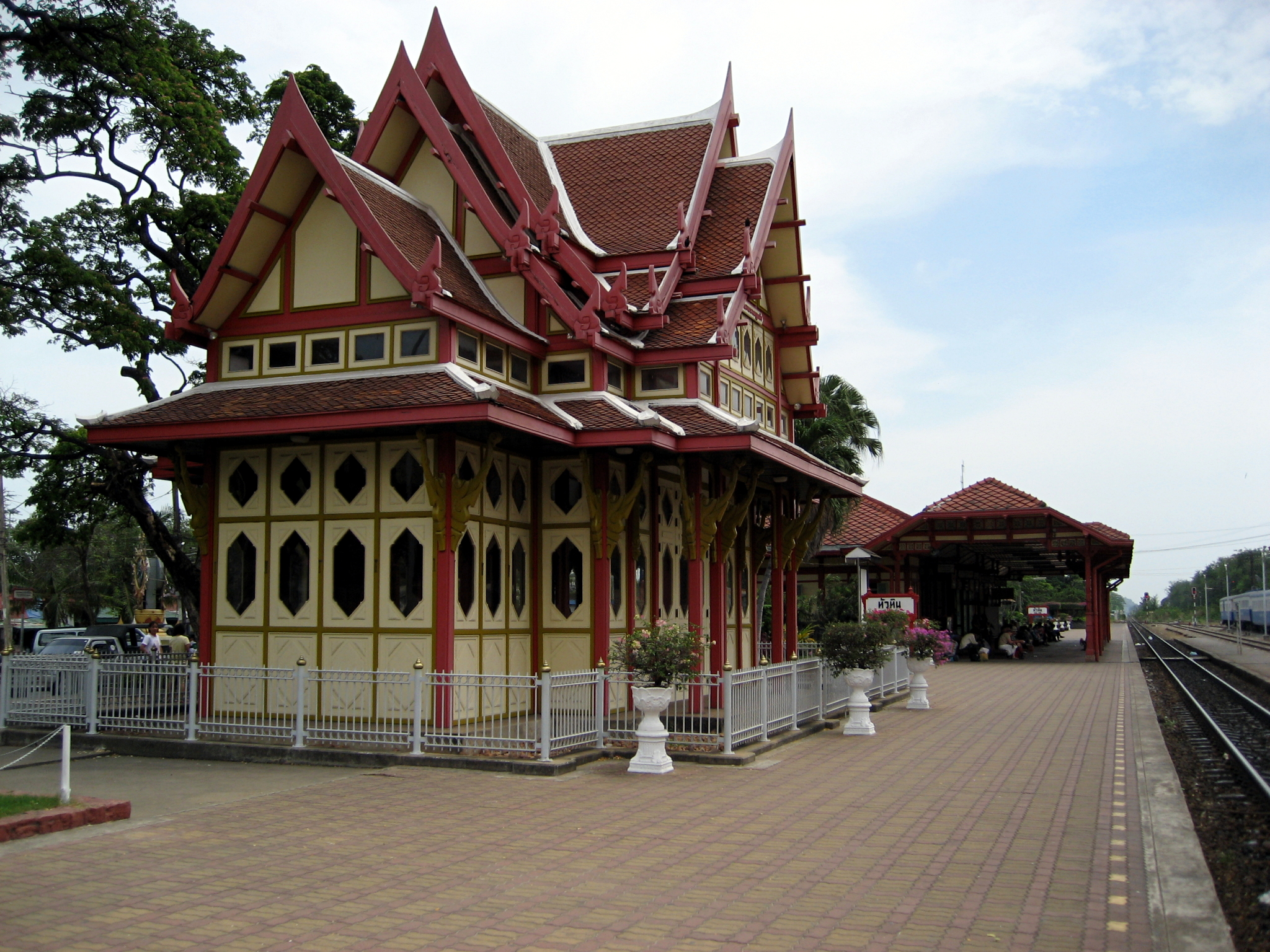
Phramongkutklao Pavilion

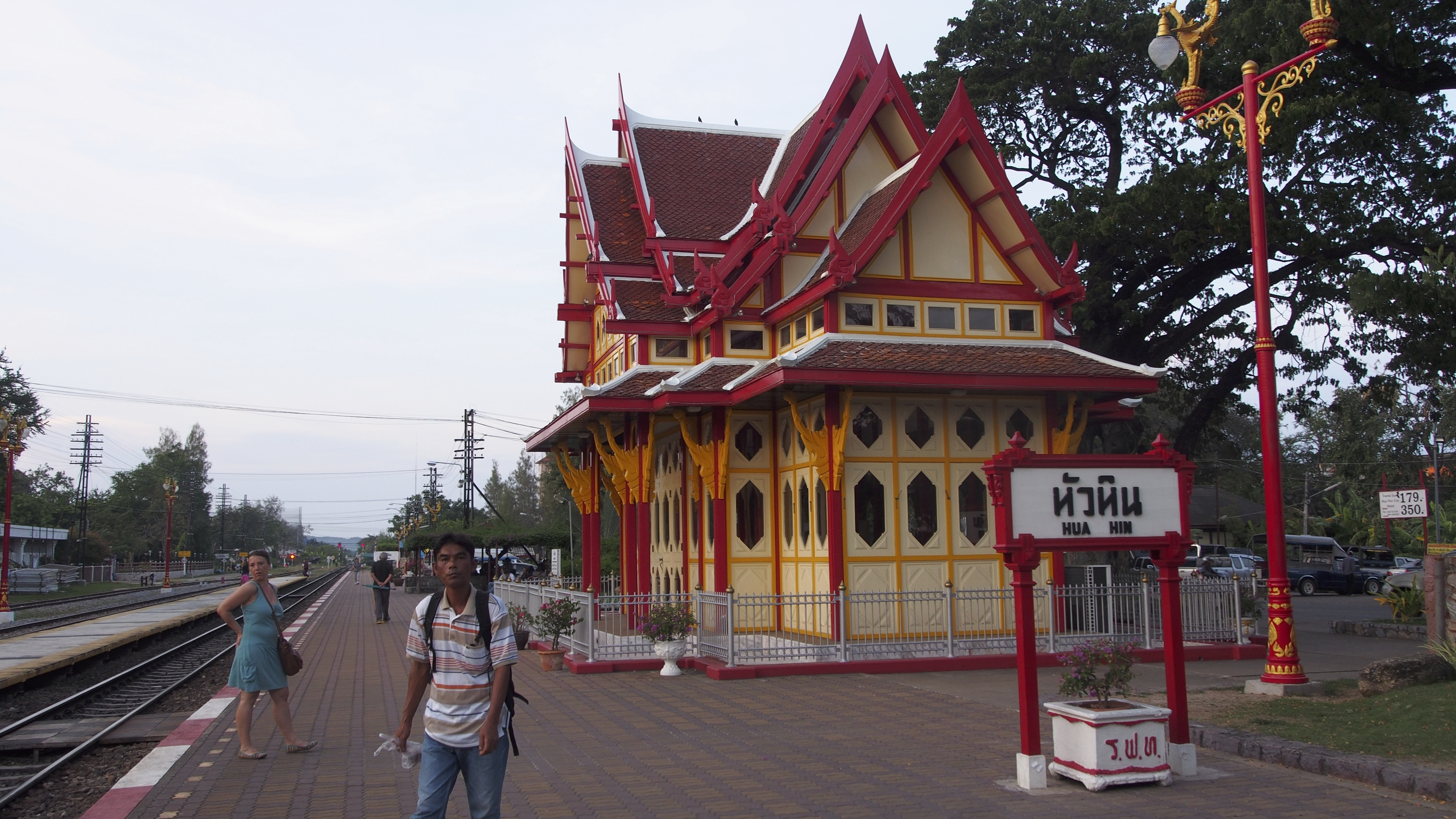
Phramongkutklao Pavilion with station signage

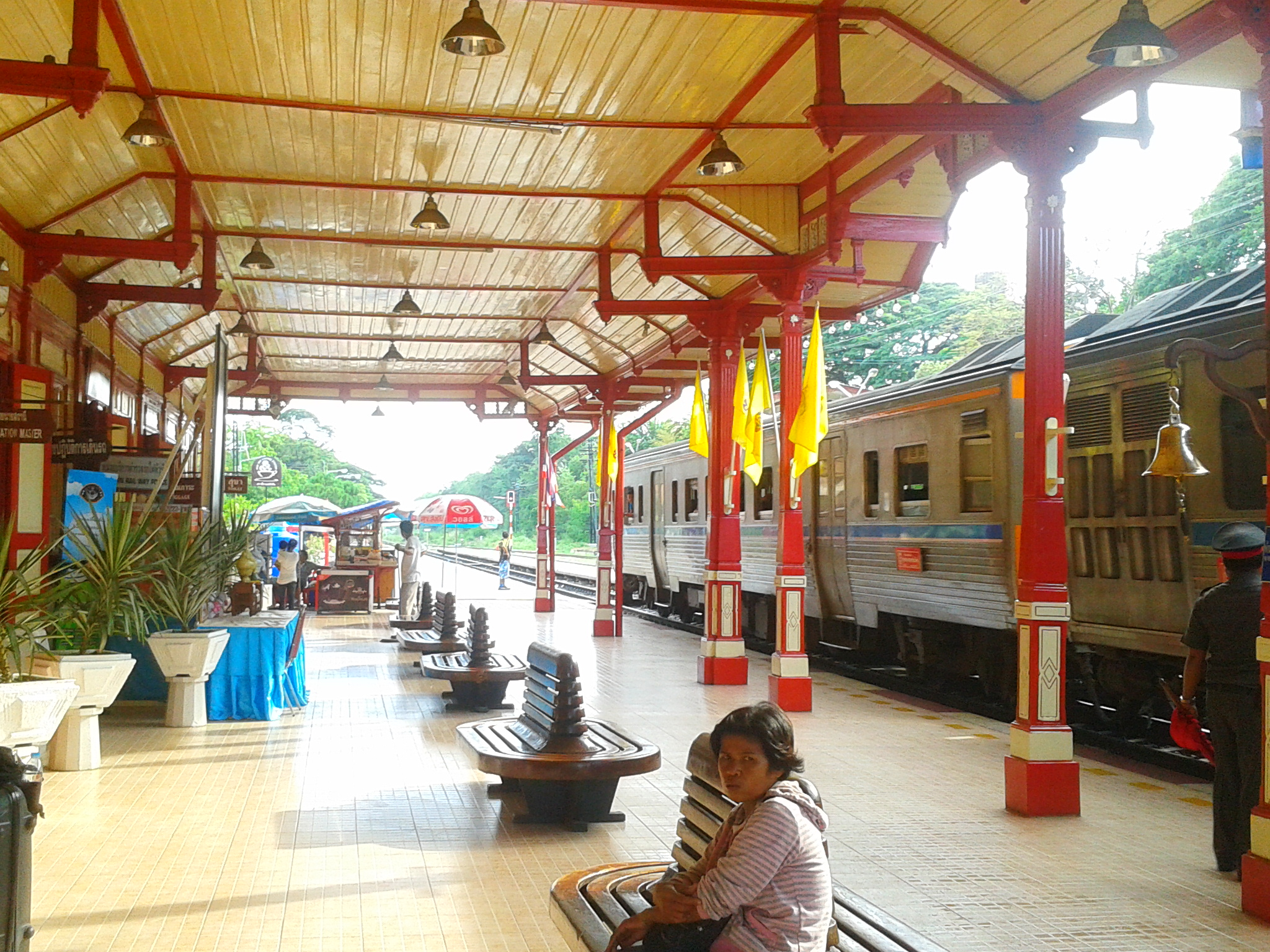
Former at-grade station platforms

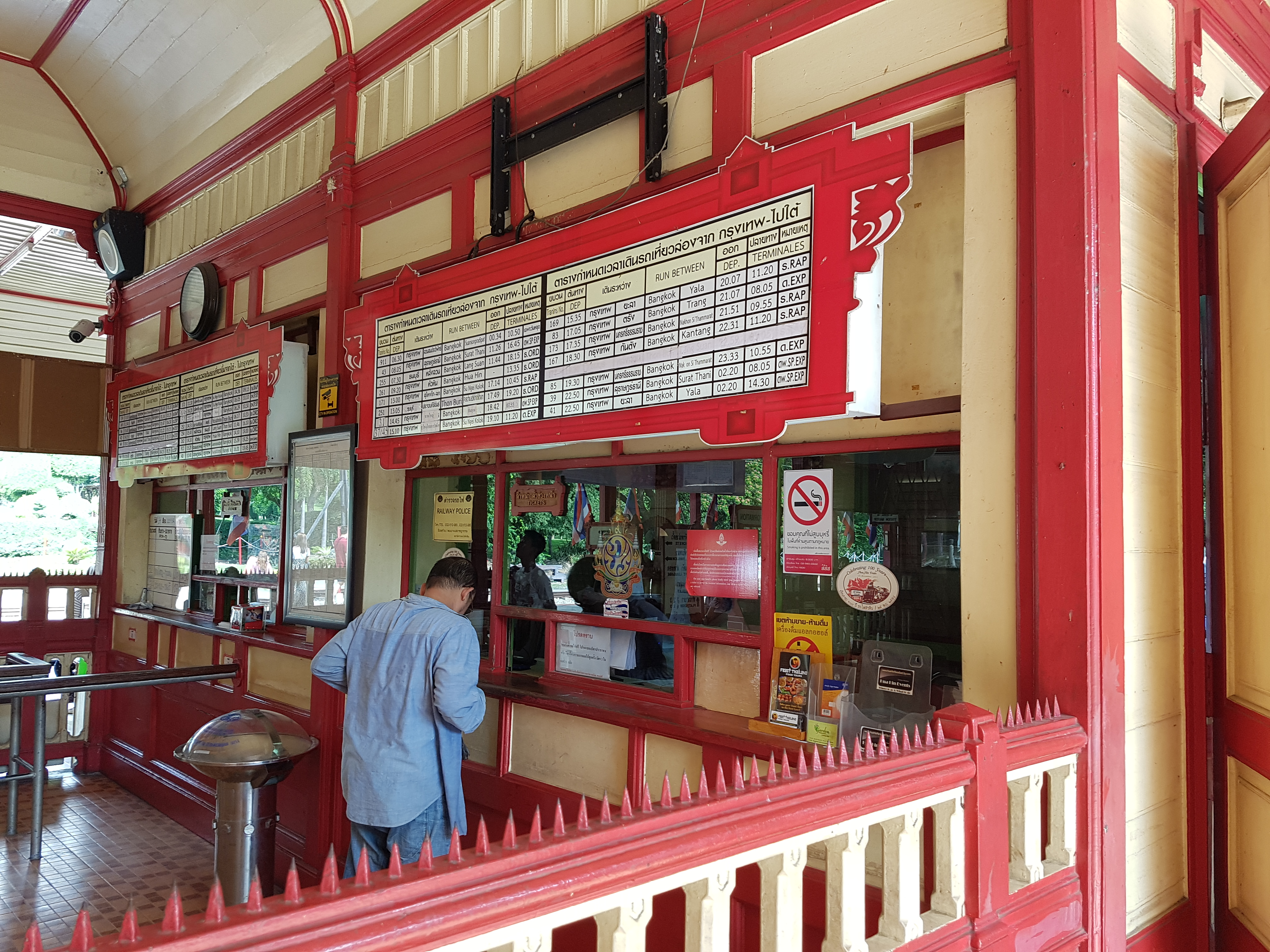
Former ticket office

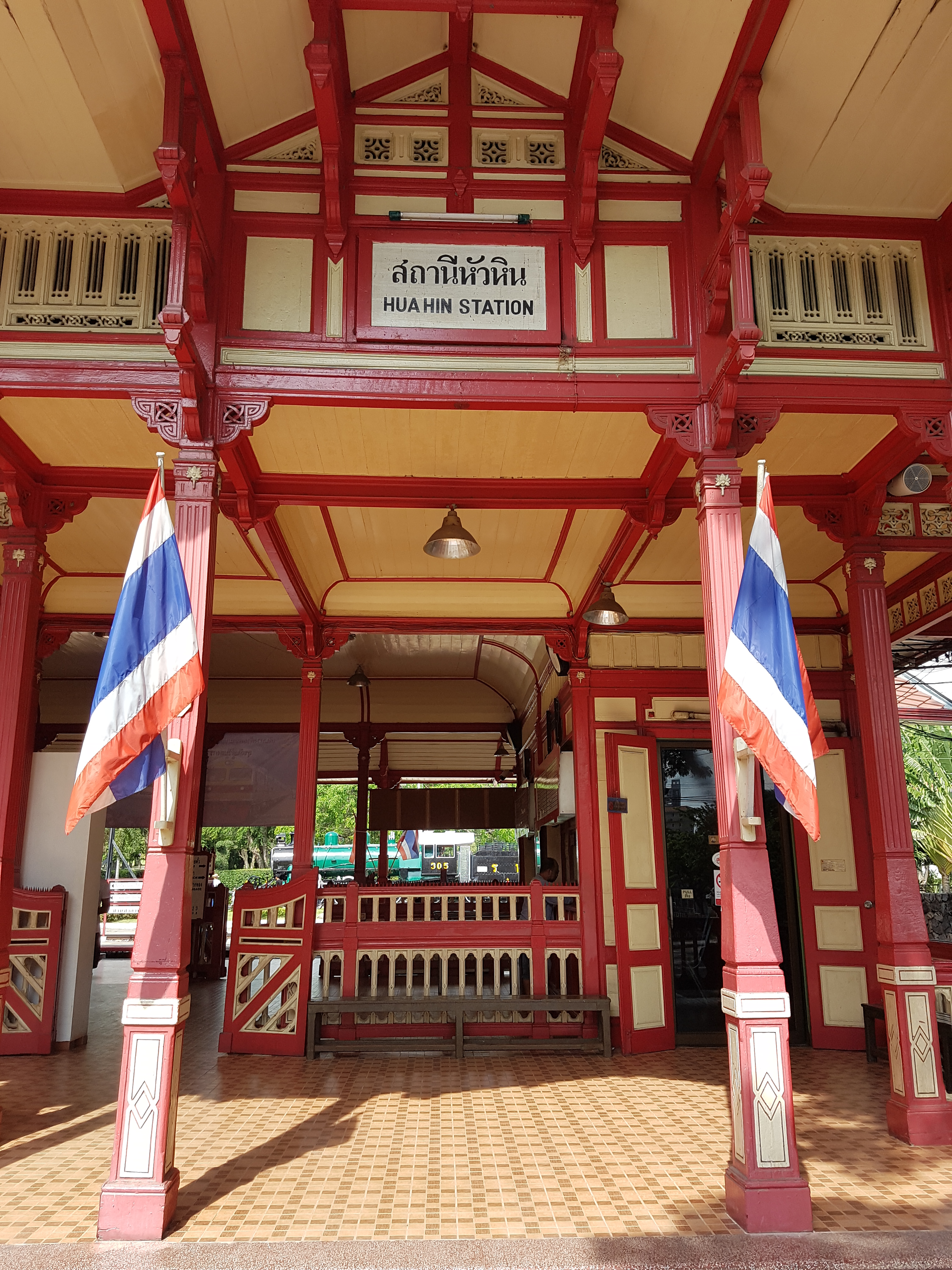
Former station facade

== Sources ==
- 高田隆雄 (1978). タイ国の蒸気機関車. エリエイ出版部.
- 柿崎一郎 (2010). 王国の鉄路 タイ鉄道の歴史. 京都大学学術出版会. ISBN 978-4-87698-848-8.
- 渡邉乙弘 (2013). タイ国鉄4000キロの旅. 文芸社. ISBN 978-4-286-13041-5.
- "สถานีรถไฟหัวหิน" [Hua Hin Railway Station]. paiduaykan.com.
- รายงานประจำปี กรมรถไฟหลวง พ.ศ. 2469 [Royal State Railways Annual Report 1926]
