= Kui Buri district =

District (amphoe) of Thailand

Kui Buri กุยบุรี
- District
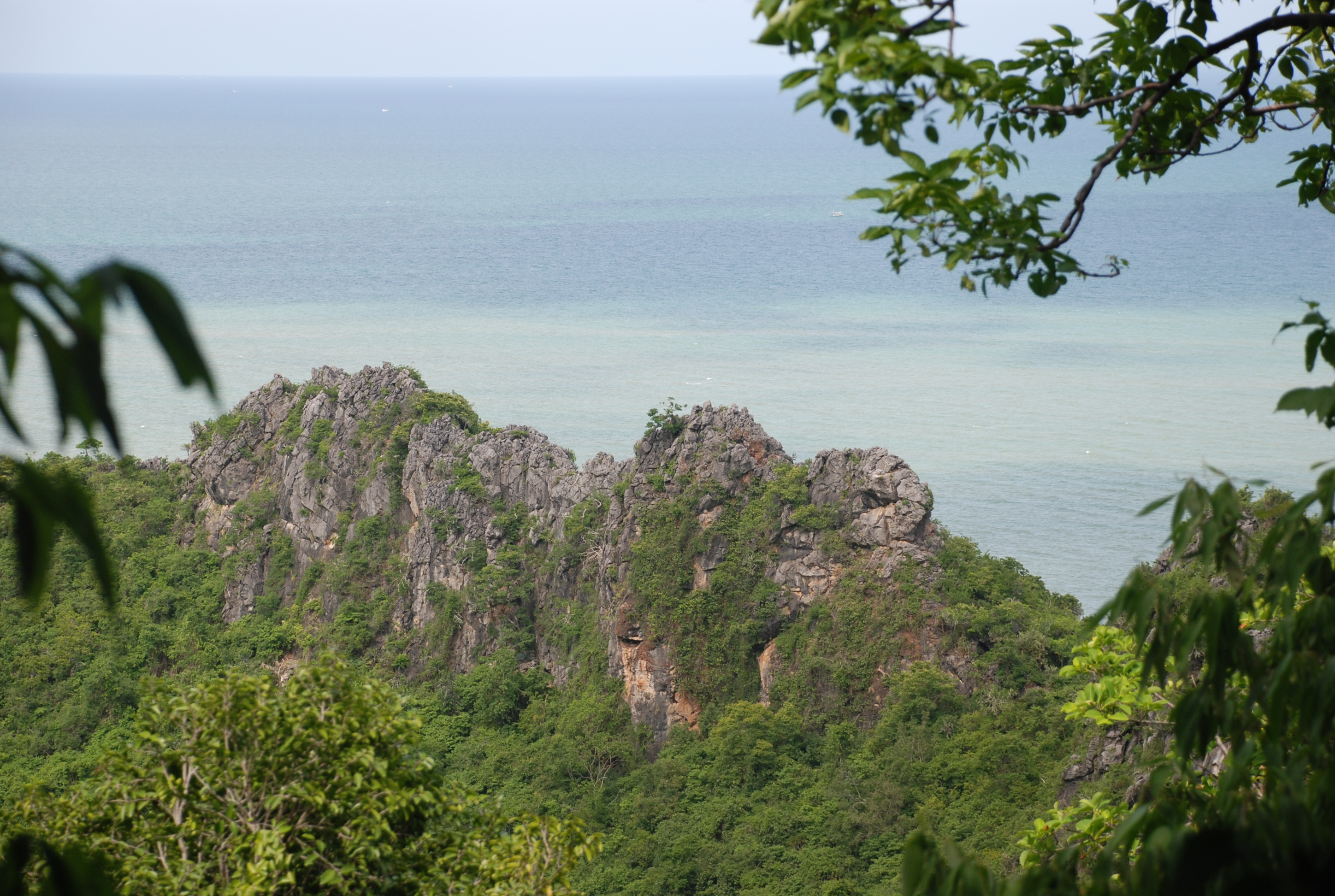

- District location in Prachuap Khiri Khan province
- Coordinates: 12°4′58″N 99°51′15″E
- Country: Thailand
- Province: Prachuap Khiri Khan

Area
  - Total: 935.4 km^{2} (361.2 sq mi)

Population (January 2025)
  - Total: 44,680
  - Density: 47.77/km^{2} (123.7/sq mi)
- Time zone: UTC+7 (ICT)
- Postal code: 77150
- Geocode: 7702

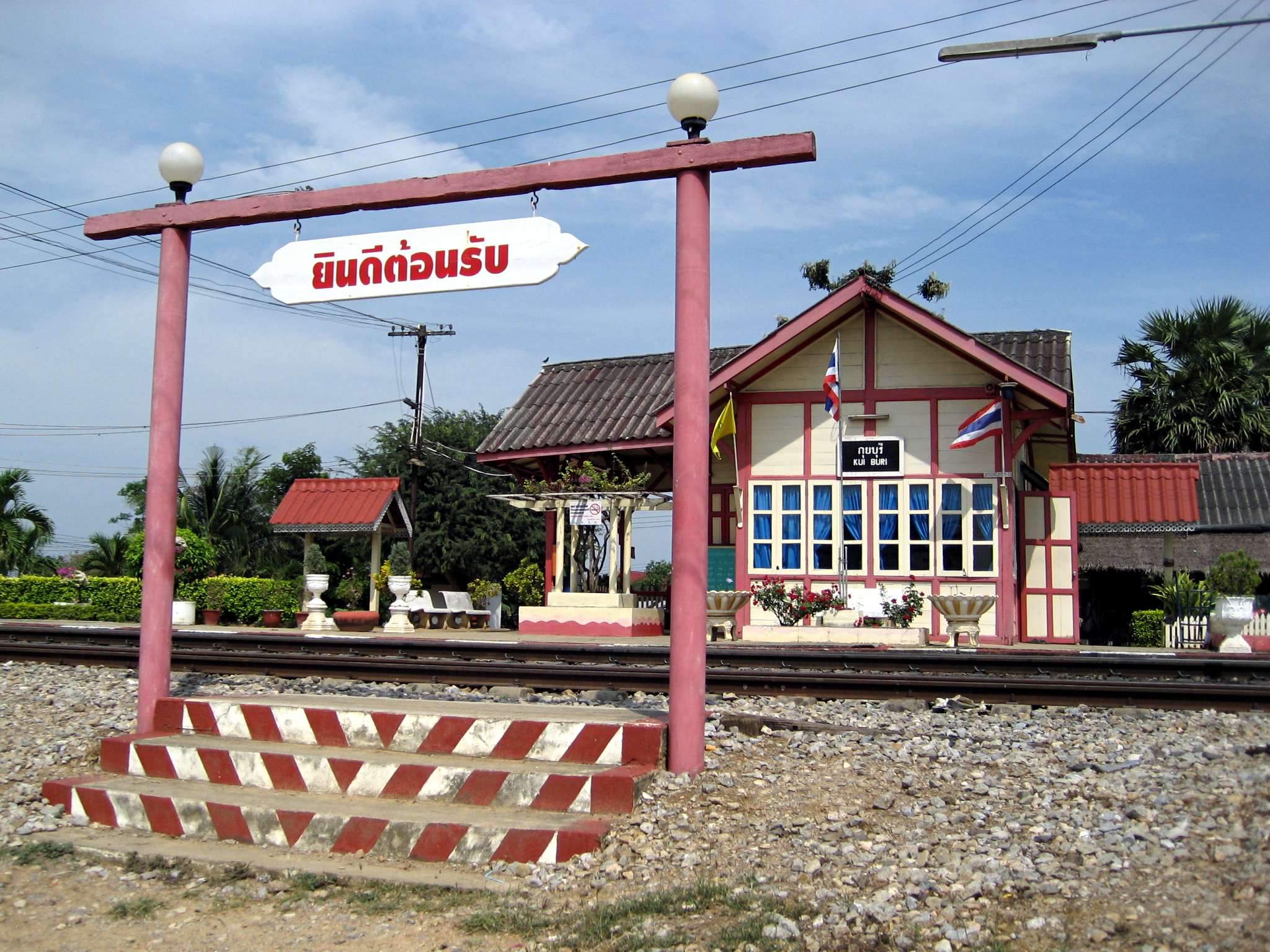
Kui Buri railway station.

Kui Buri (Thai: กุยบุรี, pronounced [kūj būrīː]) is a district (amphoe) in the northern part of Prachuap Khiri Khan province, central Thailand.

== History ==
Mueang Kui was an ancient city of the Ayutthaya Kingdom. In the reign of King Boromakot, Kui was a fourth-class city. In the Rattanakosin era, King Rama II established a Mueang Bang Nang Rom, which had its city hall in Kui Buri. King Mongkut (Rama IV) renamed Mueang Bang Nang Rom "Prachuap Khiri Khan", with the same city hall. When King Chulalongkorn created Monthon Phetchaburi, Kui Buri was included. In 1898 the city hall was moved to Ko Lak bay and Kui Buri was downgraded to a subdistrict of Mueang Prachuap Khiri Khan District. The minor district (king amphoe) of Kui Buri was re-established on 19 July 1960 and officially upgraded to a full district on 16 July 1963.

The British diplomat John Crawfurd visited the area in 1822 during the mission described in his book Journal of an embassy from the Governor-General of India to the courts of Siam and Cochin-China: exhibiting a view of the actual state of those kingdoms. He reported the name of the town as "Kwi".

Its name Kui derived from the Khmer (Khmer: គុយ), meaning "rhino horn", and buri derived from the Sanskrit purī (पुरी); meaning "town" or "city"; hence "rhino horn city". Rhino horn has been an important export product since the Ayutthaya period.

== Geography ==
Neighbouring districts are Sam Roi Yot to the north and Mueang Prachuap Khiri Khan to the south. To the west is the Tanintharyi Division of Myanmar, to the east the Gulf of Thailand.

The main river of the district is the Khlong Kui.

== Administration ==
The district is divided into six sub-districts (tambons), which are further subdivided into 47 villages (mubans). There are two townships (thesaban tambons) in the district. Kui Buri covers parts of tambons Kui Buri and Kui Nuea, and Rai Mai covers parts of tambon Sam Krathai.

No.	Name	Thai name	Villages
1.	Kui Buri	กุยบุรี	8
2.	Kui Nuea	กุยเหนือ	11
3.	Khao Daeng	เขาแดง	3
4.	Don Yai Nu	ดอนยายหนู	4
6.	Sam Krathai	สามกระทาย	10
7.	Hat Kham	หาดขาม	11

The missing number five belongs to tambon Rai Mai, reassigned to Sam Roi Yot District.
