= Pran Buri district =

Pran Buri ปราณบุรี
- District
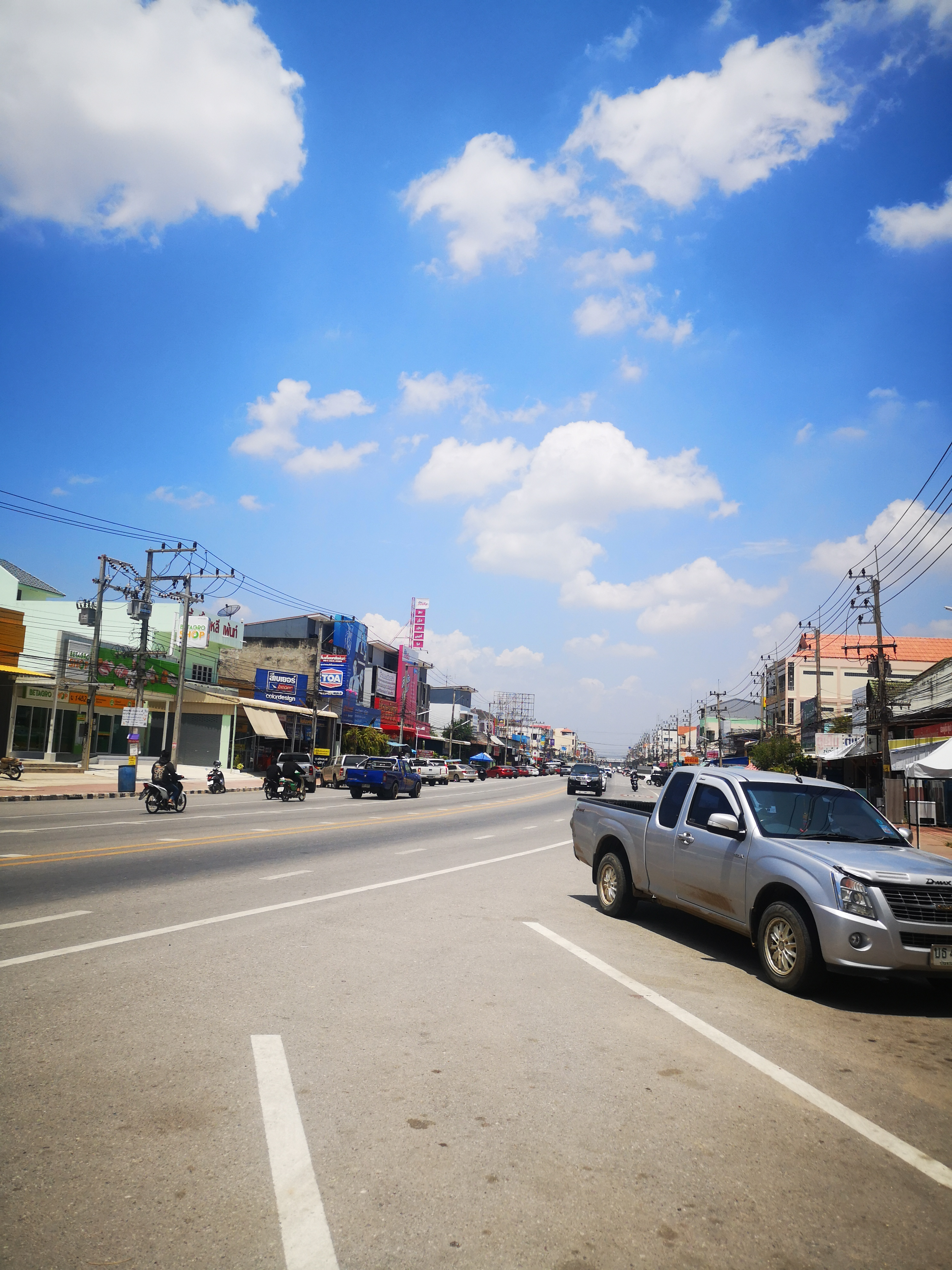
- Rattabumrung road in Pran Buri sub-district, 2024

- District location in Prachuap Khiri Khan province
- Coordinates: 12°23′42″N 99°55′0″E
- Country: Thailand
- Province: Prachuap Khiri Khan
- Seat: Khao Noi

Area
  - Total: 765.4 km^{2} (295.5 sq mi)

Population (January 2025)
  - Total: 77,839
  - Density: 101.7/km^{2} (263/sq mi)
- Time zone: UTC+7 (ICT)
- Postal code: 77120
- Geocode: 7706

Pran Buri (Thai: ปราณบุรี, pronounced [prāːn būrīː]) is a district (amphoe) in the northern part of Prachuap Khiri Khan province, central Thailand.

== History ==
Mueang Pran was a city in the southern cities group of Ayutthaya Kingdom. In 1906, King Chulalongkorn (Rama V) merged Mueang Pran, Mueang Kamnoed Nopphakhun, and Mueang Prachuap to a new Mueang Pran Buri, and determined the city hall to be at Tambon Ko Lak, now in Mueang Prachuap Khiri Khan district. In 1915, to prevent confusion between the cities' names, King Vajiravudh (Rama VI) changed the name of the province from Pran Buri to Prachuap Khiri Khan, as its center was at the same place as the former Mueang Prachuap. This also kept the name of the town and the Pran Buri River together.

== Geography ==
Neighboring districts are Hua Hin to the north and Sam Roi Yot to the south. To the west is the Tanintharyi Division of Myanmar, to the east the Gulf of Thailand.

The main water resource of the district is the Pran Buri River. The mangrove forest at the mouth of the river to the Gulf of Thailand is protected as the Pran Buri Forest Park.

== Economy ==
The Thai Pineapple Canning Industry Corporation, Ltd. (TPC) was founded in Pran Buri in 1962. It was the first pineapple processing plant in the region and is now among the 23 factories around the country that have made Thailand the world's largest exporter of canned pineapple and pineapple juice concentrate.

== Tourism ==
From a touristic overview of Pranburi, the town can be divided into 3 main neighborhoods, all within greater Pranburi.

The first neighborhood consists of the traditional fishing village of Pak Naam Pran and the long beachfront area stretching southward from Pak Naam Pran past Kao Kalok mountain, down to the new Pranburi Grand Marina.

In the middle of Pranburi, further inland, is the Historic Pranburi area, which consists of traditional Thai-style wooden homes situated along the Pranburi River, and hosts the ever-popular 200-year-old weekend market.

And finally, the more commercial and modern area of Pranburi is located along the Petchkasem highway. This is the most industrial area of Pranburi and stretches East and West on either side of Petchkasem Road.

These 3 areas are collectively known as Pranburi. While Pranburi is well known for its pineapple industry and squid fishing, historic Pranburi along the river and Pak Naam Pran's long beachfront promenade are gaining popularity with the younger generation of affluent Bangkokians, western backpackers, and full-time ex-pats who enjoy Pranburi's eclectic, artistic and Bohemian vibe.

With Pranburi attracting a younger crowd of visitors compared to its neighboring city Hua Hin, many new hip restaurants & coffee shops have recently opened. These new establishments cater to a higher-end clientele, such as Brown Brew & Bistro & the critically acclaimed, Michelin mentioned Boutique Farmers, a farm to table concept restaurant.

The Pranburi area is also extremely popular with outdoor sports enthusiasts, especially cycling, cave exploring, trail runners, and the ever-popular kiteboarding.

For more information on other interesting restaurants, hotels, and things to do in Pranburi, see this siamsociety.com blog article "15 Super Cool Places In Pranburi".

== Administration ==
The district is divided into six sub-districts (tambons), which are further subdivided into 44 villages (mubans). There are two townships (thesaban tambon). Pran Buri covers parts of tambons Pran Buri, Khao Noi and Nong Ta Taem, and Pak Nam Pran covering parts of the same-named tambon.

No.	Name	Thai	Villages	Pop.
1.	Pran Buri	ปราณบุรี	7	7,647
2.	Khao Noi	เขาน้อย	8	23,105
4.	Pak Nam Pran	ปากน้ำปราณ	5	15,405
7.	Nong Ta Taem	หนองตาแต้ม	11	13,103
8.	Wang Phong	วังก์พง	7	16,012
9.	Khao Chao	เขาจ้าว	6	2,567

Missing numbers are tambons which now form Sam Roi Yot district.
