= Suan Son Pradiphat Beach =

Beach in Thailand

Coordinates: 12.498147°N 99.974203°E

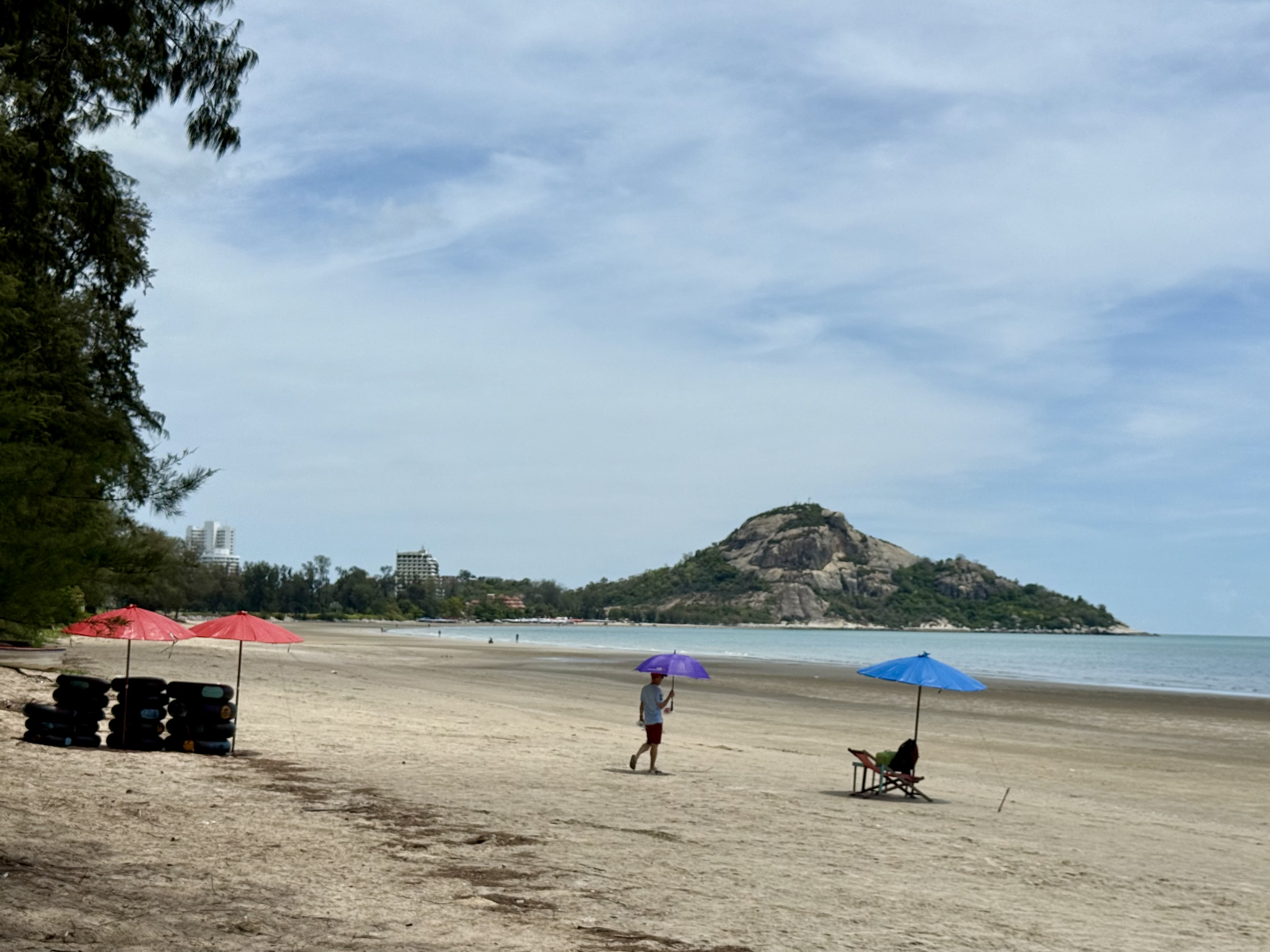
Suan Son Pradiphat with Khao Takiab in the distance

Suan Son Pradiphat (Thai: สวนสนประดิพัทธ์, pronounced [sǔan sǒn prā.dī.pʰát]) is a tranquil beach located in Nong Kae Subdistrict, Hua Hin District, Prachuap Khiri Khan Province, Thailand, approximately 9 km (5.5 mi) south of Hua Hin town. The beach is separated from central Hua Hin by Khao Takiab hill and is recognized as a popular yet relatively quiet marine destination.

The name "Suan Son Pradiphat" literally means "pine garden," referring to the numerous Casuarina junghuhniana trees (often called "pine" in Thai) that provide ample shade along the shoreline.

The beach lies within a military zone supervised by the Infantry Center of the Royal Thai Army (RTA). As a result, it tends to be less crowded than other beaches in the region. All facilities and services, such as restaurants, food courts, coffee shops, restrooms, showers, and accommodations for overnight stays, are operated under the army's management. Visitors can also rent tables, beach chairs, and umbrellas from these military-run services.

At the entrance to the beach, a large skeleton of a Bryde's whale is on public display, offering a unique educational attraction.

Suan Son Pradiphat is easily accessible via Phetkasem Road (Highway 4). It is located just 2 km (1.2 mi) from Rajabhakti Park, with the highway running between the two locations.

An excursion train service from Bangkok terminates here every Saturday, Sunday, and on public holidays, making it a convenient weekend getaway.
