= Wang Phong railway station =

Railway station in Wang Phong, Thailand

Coordinates: 12.4036°N 99.9329°E

Wang Phong วังก์พง
- Station in 2022

General information
- Location: Ban Wat Wang Phong-Pran Buri Hospital Road, Mu 2, Wang Phong Subdistrict, Pran Buri District, Prachuap Khiri Khan
- Owner: State Railway of Thailand
- Line: Southern Line
- Platforms: 2
- Tracks: 4

Other information
- Station code: วพ.

History
- Opened: 1 January 1914

Services
Preceding station	State Railway of Thailand	Following station
Khao Tao towards Hua Lamphong or Krung Thep Aphiwat	Southern Line	Pran Buri towards Su-ngai Kolok
Location

Wang Phong railway station (Thai: สถานีวังก์พง) is a railway station located in Wang Phong Subdistrict, Pran Buri District, Prachuap Khiri Khan Province, Thailand. It is a class 2 railway station located 232.924 kilometres (144.7 mi) from Thon Buri railway station and the main station of Pran Buri District. It is the closest station to Thanarat Military Base (Infantry Centre)

== History ==
The station opened on 1 January 1914 as the terminus station of the Southern Line extension from Hua Hin. The line was later extended to Prachuap Khiri Khan in June 1914. During the steam era, the station was a water and fueling point as it is located near the Pranburi River. There was also a locomotive depot, and a turntable for the mixed train Thon Buri - Pran Buri. These infrastructures were demolished during the construction of double-track section.

The station was rebuilt in 2022 as part of the double-track section from Nakhon Pathom to Chumphon. A new station building and elevated platforms were built.

Ho mok (steamed curry) is the signature dish of Wang Phong railway station. When the train stops, vendors peddle their wares along the platforms and carriages.

== Services ==
Every passenger trains stopped at Wang Phong (except for Thaksinarath Express 31/32 from Krung Thep Aphiwat - Hat Yai Junction - Krung Thep Aphiwat)

- Thaksin Express 37/38 Krung Thep Aphiwat - Su-ngai Kolok - Krung Thep Aphiwat
- Special Express 39/40 Krung Thep Aphiwat - Surat Thani - Krung Thep Aphiwat
- Special Express 43/44 Krung Thep Aphiwat - Surat Thani - Krung Thep Aphiwat
- International Express 45/46 Krung Thep Aphiwat - Padang Besar - Krung Thep Aphiwat (coupled with Thaksin Express 37/38)
- Express 83/84 Krung Thep Aphiwat - Trang - Krung Thep Aphiwat
- Express 85/86 Krung Thep Aphiwat - Nakhon Si Thammarat - Krung Thep Aphiwat
- Rapid 167/168 Krung Thep Aphiwat - Kantang - Krung Thep Aphiwat
- Rapid 169/170 Krung Thep Aphiwat - Yala - Krung Thep Aphiwat
- Rapid 171/172 Krung Thep Aphiwat - Su-ngai Kolok - Krung Thep Aphiwat
- Rapid 173/174 Krung Thep Aphiwat - Nakhon Si Thammarat - Krung Thep Aphiwat
- Ordinary 251/252 Thon Buri - Prachuap Khiri Khan - Thon Buri
- Ordinary 254/255 Lang Suan - Thon Buri - Lang Suan
