= Sam Roi Yot district =

Sam Roi Yot district อำเภอสามร้อยยอด
- District
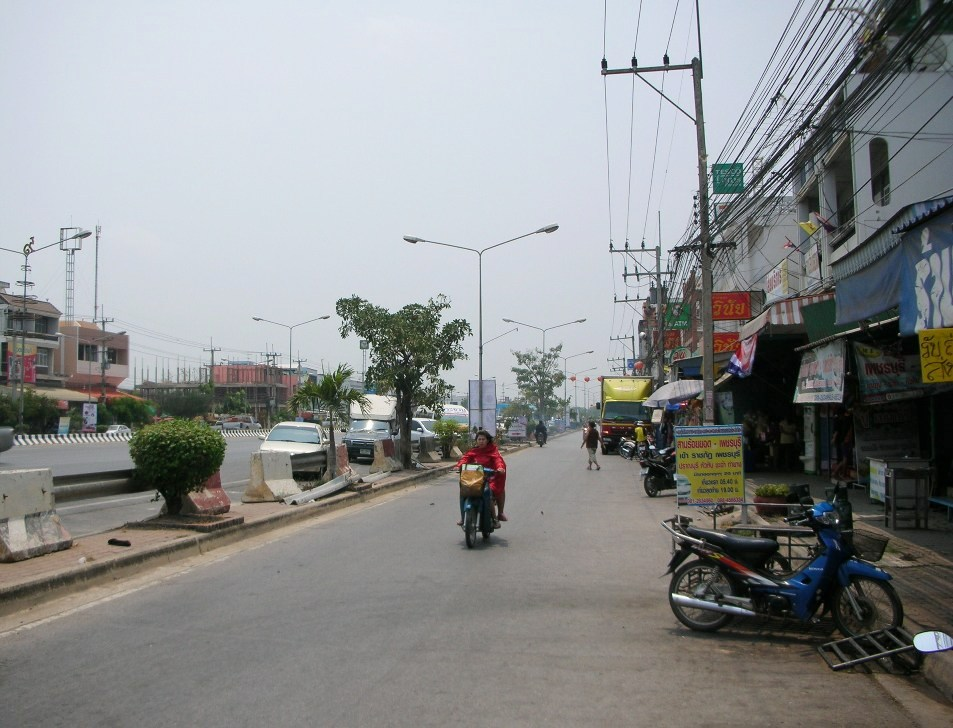
- Rai Mai (ไร่ใหม่), Sam Roi Yot District

- District location in Prachuap Khiri Khan province
- Coordinates: 12°16′14″N 99°52′19″E
- Country: Thailand
- Province: Prachuap Khiri Khan
- Subdistricts: 5
- Mubans: 41
- District established: 1995

Area
  - Total: 871.9 km^{2} (336.6 sq mi)

Population (January 2025)
  - Total: 48,396
  - Density: 55.51/km^{2} (143.8/sq mi)
- Time zone: UTC+7 (ICT)
- Postal code: 77120
- Geocode: 7708

Sam Roi Yot (Thai: สามร้อยยอด, pronounced [sǎːm rɔ́ːj jɔ̂ːt]; lit. 'three hundred spires') is a district (amphoe) in the northern part of Prachuap Khiri Khan province, central Thailand.

== History ==
The minor district (king amphoe) Sam Roi Yot was created on 1 April 1995 by splitting tambons Rai Kao, Sila Loi, and Sam Roi Yot from Pran Buri district.

On 7 September 1995 tambon Sala Lai was created by splitting off six mubans from Rai Kao. On 1 January 1996 the subdistrict Rai Mai was reassigned from Kui Buri district to the minor district.

On 15 May 2007, all 81 minor districts in Thailand were upgraded to full districts. With publication in the Royal Gazette on 24 August, the upgrade became official.

The British diplomat John Crawfurd visited the area in 1822 during the mission described in his book Journal of an Embassy from the Governor-General of India to the Courts of Siam and Cochin-China: Exhibiting a View of the Actual State of Those Kingdoms. He reported that it was then already called Sam Roi Yot and described the view of the coast as "novel and imposing".

== Geography ==
Neighbouring districts are Pran Buri to the north and Kui Buri to the south. To the west is the Tanintharyi Division of Myanmar, to the east the Gulf of Thailand.

At the shore of the gulf is Khao Sam Roi Yot National Park, the first coastal national park of Thailand, established in 1966.

== Administration ==
=== Central administration ===
Sam Roi Yot is divided into five sub-districts (tambons), which are further subdivided into 41 administrative villages (mubans).

No.	Name	Thai	Villages	Pop.
1.	Sam Roi Yot	สามร้อยยอด	9	8,105
2.	Sila Loi	ศิลาลอย	9	11,094
3.	Rai Kao	ไร่เก่า	8	12,808
4.	Salalai	ศาลาลัย	8	7,517
5.	Rai Mai	ไร่ใหม่	7	8,872

=== Local administration ===
There are two sub-district municipalities (thesaban tambons) in the district:

- Rai Mai (Thai: เทศบาลตำบลไร่ใหม่) consisting of parts of sub-districts Sam Krathai (Kui Buri District) and Rai Mai.
- Rai Kao (Thai: เทศบาลตำบลไร่เก่า) consisting of parts of sub-districts Rai Kao and Salalai.

There are five sub-district administrative organizations (SAO) in the district:

- Sam Roi Yot (Thai: องค์การบริหารส่วนตำบลสามร้อยยอด) consisting of sub-district Sam Roi Yot.
- Sila Loi (Thai: องค์การบริหารส่วนตำบลศิลาลอย) consisting of sub-district Sila Loi.
- Rai Kao (Thai: องค์การบริหารส่วนตำบลไร่เก่า) consisting of parts of sub-district Rai Kao.
- Salalai (Thai: องค์การบริหารส่วนตำบลศาลาลัย) consisting of parts of sub-district Salalai.
- Rai Mai (Thai: องค์การบริหารส่วนตำบลไร่ใหม่) consisting of parts of sub-district Rai Mai.
