= Kasetsart University =

Public university in Bangkok, Thailand

- มหาวิทยาลัยเกษตรศาสตร์
- Phra Phirun mounted on a naga
- Former name: College of Agriculture
- Motto: ศาสตร์แห่งแผ่นดิน (official); ประชาชน คือ เจ้าของประเทศ เกษตรศาสตร์ คือ ภาษีของประชาชน (unofficial)
- Motto in English: Knowledge of the Land (official); People own the nation and their taxes become Kasetsart (unofficial)
- Type: National
- Established: February 2, 1943; 83 years ago
- Founders: Luang Suwan Vajokkasikij; Phra Chuangkasetsinlapakan; Luang Ingkhasikasikan
- Affiliations: ASAIHL
- President: Dr. Damrong Sripraram (Acting)
- Royal conferrer: Chulabhorn Walailak, Princess Srisavangavadhana on behalf of the King
- Academic staff: 3,805 (2017)
- Students: 86,536 (2019)
- Undergraduates: 76,245 (2019)
- Postgraduates: 8,816 (2019)
- Doctoral students: 1,475 (2019)
- Location: Chatuchak, Bangkok, Thailand; 13°50′54.95″N 100°34′04.98″E
- Campus: Urban and Rural (varied by campus)
- Anthem: "Kasetsart"
- Colours: Forest green
- Mascot: Nontri (tree)
- Website: ku.ac.th

Kasetsart University (Thai: มหาวิทยาลัยเกษตรศาสตร์, lit. 'The University of Agricultural Sciences'; RTGS: Mahawitthayalai Kasetsat; commonly Kaset or KU) is a public research university in Bangkok, Thailand. It is the largest university in Thailand. It was Thailand's first agricultural university and Thailand's third oldest university. It was established on 2 February 1943 to promote subjects related to agricultural science. Since then, Kasetsart University has expanded its subject areas to cover life sciences, science, engineering, social sciences, and humanities. Kasetsart University's main campus is in Bangkhen, northern Bangkok, with several other campuses throughout Thailand.

== History ==
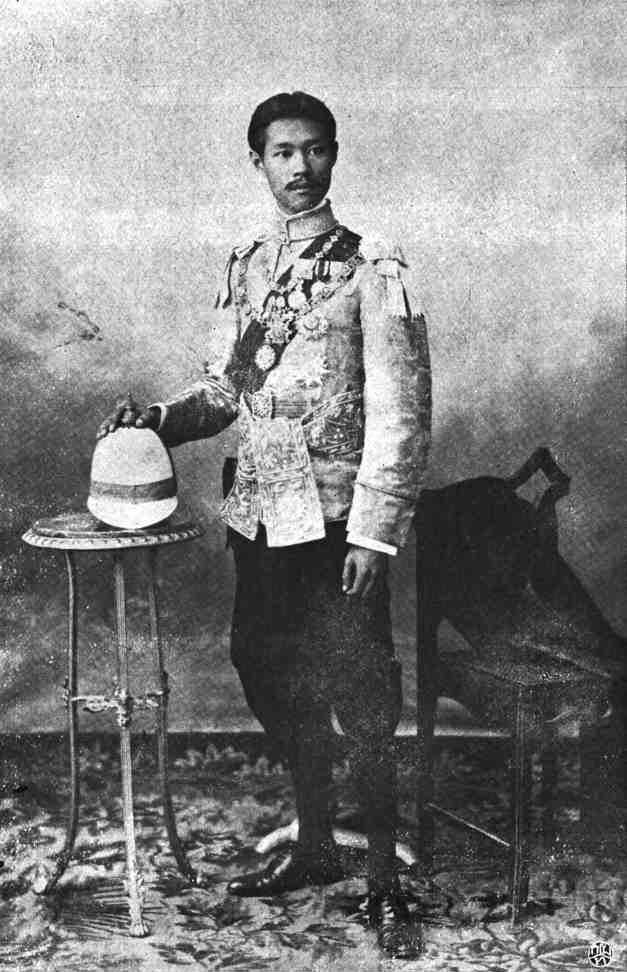
Prince Benbadhanabongse, the Prince of Phichai

In 1902, King Chulalongkorn attempted to promote the country's silk, silverware, and weaving industries. He hired Dr Kametaro Toyama, from the University of Tokyo, to train Siamese students in Japanese silk and weaving crafts. In 1904, the School of Sericulture was founded at Tambon Thung Saladaeng, Bangkok by Prince Benbadhanabongse, the director of the department of sericulture of the Ministry of Agriculture. The school was renamed the School of Agriculture in 1906.

In 1908, the School of the Ministry of Agriculture was founded at Windsor Palace as the Ministry of Agriculture merged three schools, the School of Surveying (founded in 1882), the School of Irrigation (founded in 1905), and the School of Agriculture. Thailand's first tertiary-level agriculture curriculum began to offer courses in 1909. However, the Siamese government merged the School of the Ministry of Agriculture with the Civil Service College in 1913, due to the objective of founding the school meets the royal initiative of establishment the Civil Service College of King Vajiravudh.

In 1917, Phraya Thepsartsatit and Chaophraya Thammasakmontri of the Ministry of Education founded the first primary school of agriculture under the Ministry of Agriculture, named the Primary School Agriculture Teacher Training School in Tambon Horwang. It moved to Tambon Phra Prathon, Nakhon Pathom Province in 1918.

In 1931, Prince Sithiporn Kridakara and Chaophraya Thammasakmontri together expanded the school regionally. In the central region, a campus was located in Saraburi Province, in the northern region in Chiang Mai Province, in the northeastern region in Nakhon Ratchasima Province, and in the southern region in Songkhla Province.

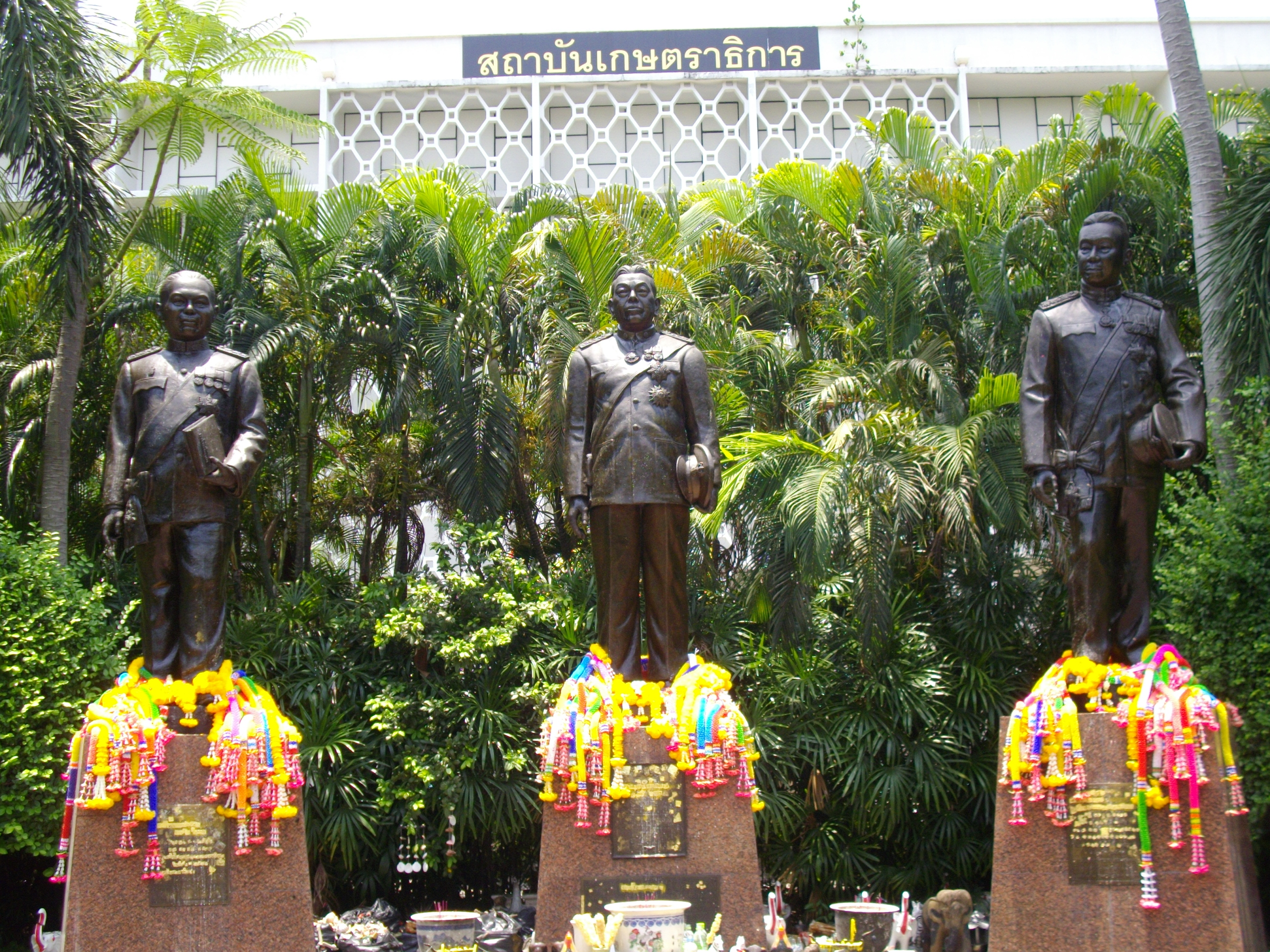
Statue of the Three Masters of Kasetsart University

In 1935, the Primary School Agriculture Teacher Training School in each part of the country was closed and merged following the agricultural education policy in that time. Luang Ingkhasikasikan, Luang Suwan Vajokkasikij, and Phra Chuangkasetsinlapakan together proposed to maintain the Mae Jo School (today's Mae Jo University) at Chiang Mai Province only and renamed it Secondary-level Agriculture Technical School before it was elevated to the College of Agriculture, under the Department of Agriculture and Fisheries.

The Ministry of Agriculture established the Central Agriculture Station or "Kaset Klang", in Bang Khen District, Bangkok. It caused the College of Agriculture to move to Bang Khen District in 1938 and the government office at Chiang Mai Province became Kasetsart Preparatory School to prepare students to study at the College of Agriculture in Bang Khen.

In 1943, Field Marshal Plaek Phibunsongkhram promoted the College of Agriculture and established Kasetsart University as a department of the Ministry of Agriculture. The university initially consisted of four faculties: agriculture, fisheries, forestry, and cooperatives (today's divided into Faculty of Economics and Faculty of Business Administration).

In 1966, Mom Luang Xujati Kambhu, the Fifth President of Kasetsart University, judged the Bang Khen campus too confined and unable to support the education in agricultural sciences called for by the National Social and Economics Development Plan. The Kamphaeng Saen campus was established on 12 November 1979 as a result.

The university further expanded by establishing Sriracha campus, Chalermphrakiat Sakon Nakhon Province campus, Suphan Buri campus, Krabi campus and Lopburi campus. The university already established Si Racha campus in 1989 and the Chalermphrakiat Sakon Nakhon Province campus on 15 August 1996.

On 18 July 2015, the Kasetsart University Act B.E. 2558 (2015) transformed it from a public university to a national university.

== Symbols ==
=== Phra Phirun ===
Kasetsart University's symbol is Phra Phirun, the god of rain mounted on a Nāga with encircled by lotus petals and then by the words "มหาวิทยาลัยเกษตรศาสตร์ พ.ศ. ๒๔๘๖" in the Thai version and "KASETSART UNIVERSITY 1943" in the English version.

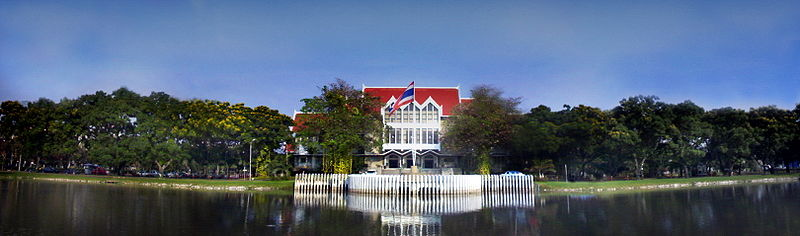
Nine nontri trees in front of KU's main auditorium

=== Nontri tree ===
The Nontri tree has been a symbol of Kasetsart University since 1963. King Bhumibol Adulyadej and Queen Sirikit planted nine nontri trees in the front of Kasetsart University's main auditorium on 29 November 1963 which became historic day for Kasetsart University people.

The nontri is a tree in the family Fabaceae. It is a long-lived evergreen with grey-brown bark with upright branches. The leaves are bipinnate compound and the flowers are yellow, produced in large compound racemes. Its fruit is a pod containing seeds.

== Organization ==
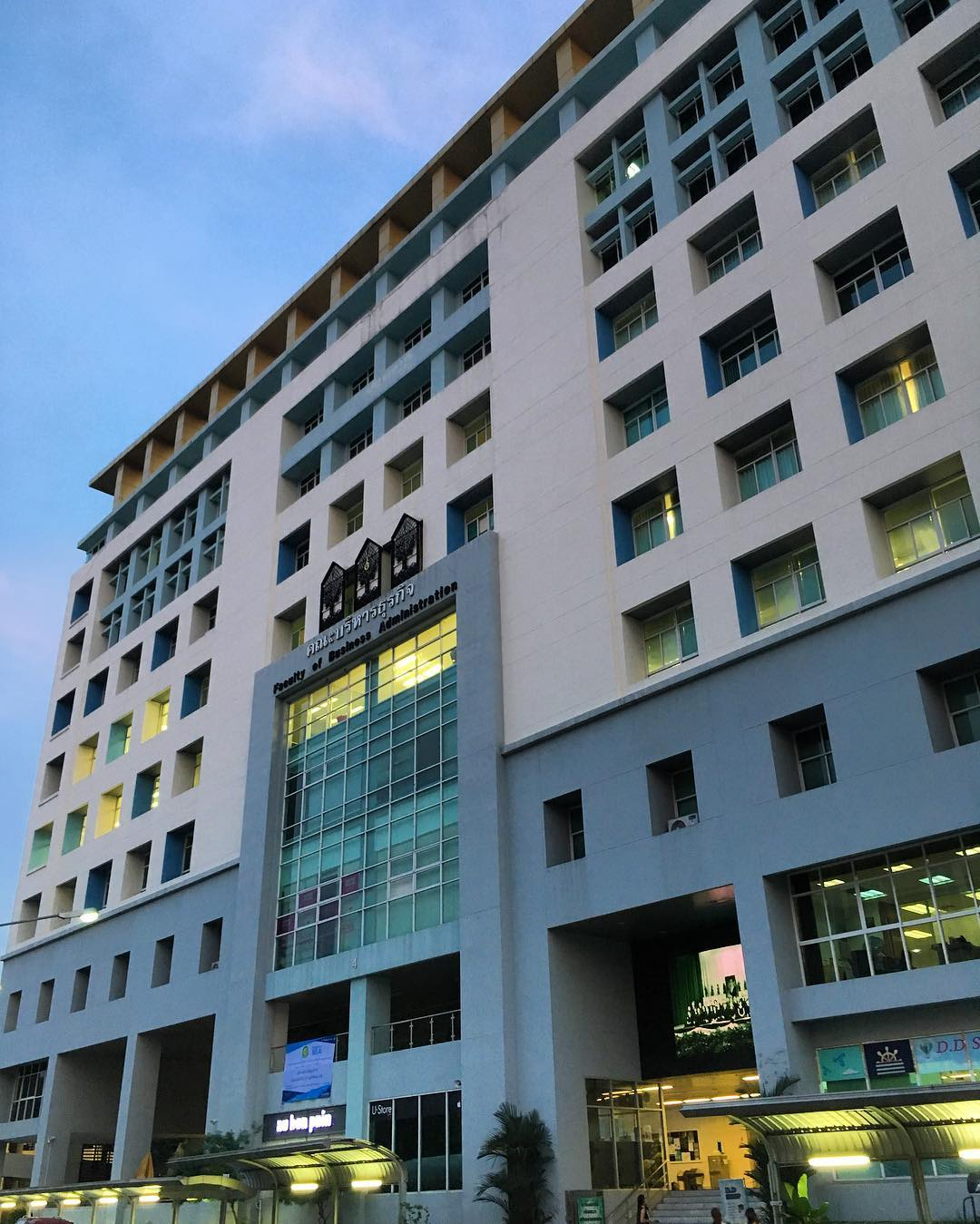
Kasetsart Business School at Bangkhen

=== Bangkhen ===
Kasetsart University occupies 846 rai (135.4 ha; 334 acres) in Chatuchak District, Bangkok. Located near the Kasetsart University BTS station.

- Faculty of Agriculture
- Faculty of Agro-Industry
- Faculty of Architecture
- Faculty of Business Administration
- Faculty of Economics
- Faculty of Education
- Faculty of Engineering
- Faculty of Environment
- Faculty of Fisheries
- Faculty of Forestry
- Faculty of Humanities
- Faculty of Medicine
- Faculty of Nursing
- Faculty of Science
- Faculty of Social Sciences
- Faculty of Veterinary Medicine
- Faculty of Veterinary Technology
- School of Integrated Science
- Graduate School
- International College Establishment Project

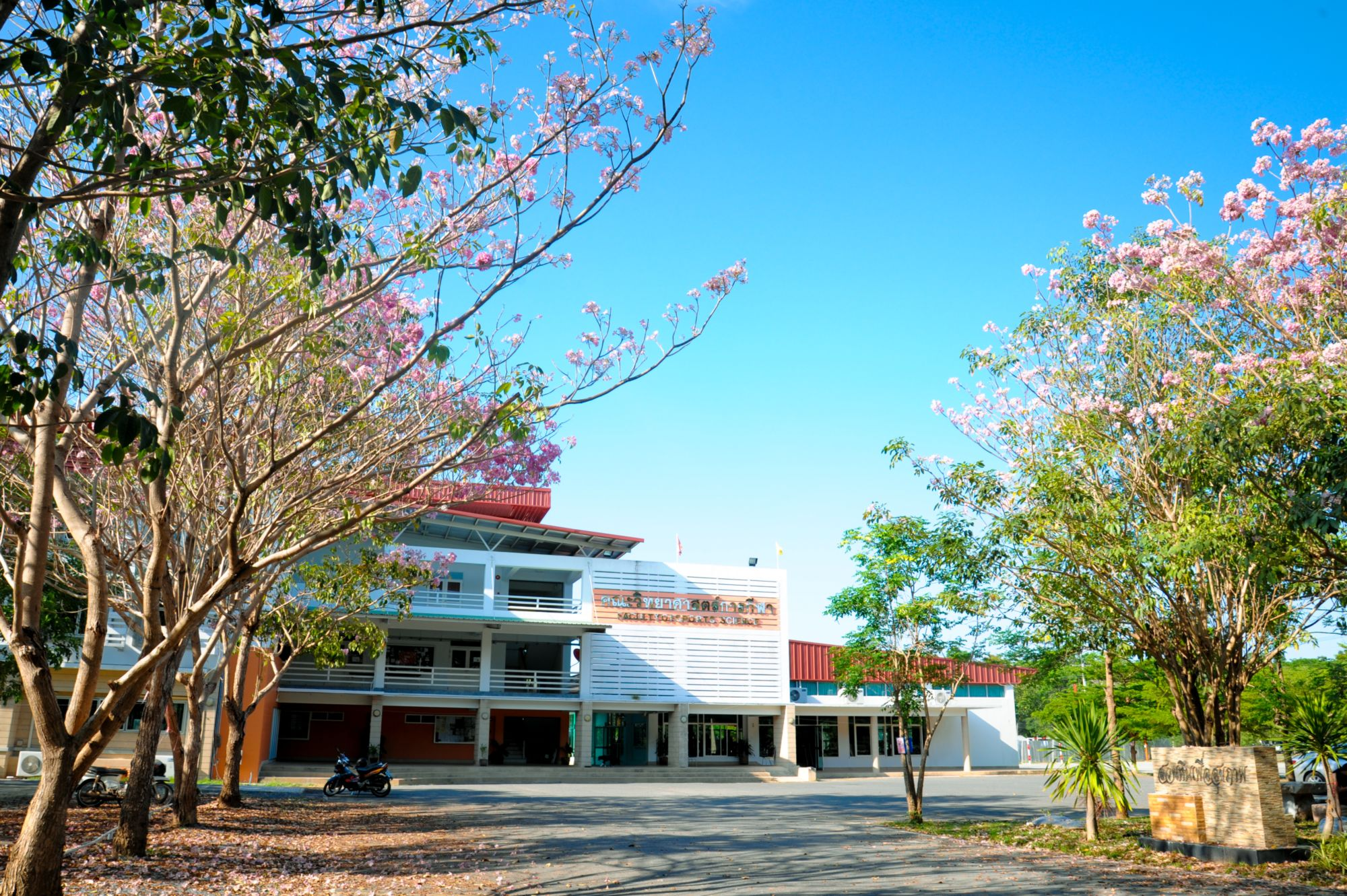
Faculty of Sport Science at Kamphaeng Saen campus

=== Kamphaeng Saen Campus ===
The Kamphaeng Saen Campus is the first and largest branch of Kasetsart University established in 1979. The campus is situated in Kamphaeng Saen District, Nakhon Pathom Province with the area of 7,951.75 rai (1272 hectares).

- Faculty of Agriculture at Kamphaeng Saen
- Faculty of Engineering at Kamphaeng Saen
- Faculty of Education and Development Sciences
- Faculty of Hospitality Industry
- Faculty of Liberal Arts and Science
- Faculty of Sports Science
- Faculty of Veterinary Medicine at Kamphaeng Saen

=== Sriracha Campus ===
The Sriracha Campus was established in 1988, and occupies an area of 199 rai (32 hectares) in the Si Racha District of Chonburi Province.

- Faculty of Management Sciences
- Faculty of Engineering at Sriracha
- Faculty of Science at Sriracha
- Faculty of Economics at Sriracha
- Faculty of International Maritime Studies

=== Chalermphrakiat Sakon Nakhon Province Campus ===
The Chalermphakiat Sakon Nakhon Province Campus was established in 1996 to commemorate the Golden Jubilee Anniversary of King Bhumibol Adulyadej's Accession to the Throne. The campus occupies the area of 4,488 rai (718 hectares) in Mueang District of Sakon Nakhon Province.

- Faculty of Natural Resources and Agro-Industry
- Faculty of Science and Engineering
- Faculty of Liberal Arts and Management Sciences
- Faculty of Public Health

=== Affiliated Institute ===
- Irrigation College
- Boromrajonani College of Nursing Napparat Vajira

== Academic profile ==
=== Rankings ===
University rankings

Global – Overall
- CWUR World: 1298 (2023)
- QS World: 701-710 (2026)
- QS Employability: 301-500 (2020)
- RUR World: 624 (2020)
- THE World: 1501+ (2023)
- USNWR Global: =1,106 (2021)

Global – Business and economics
- QS Business: 501-550 (2023)

Global – Liberal arts
- THE Social Sciences: 801+ (2023)

Global – Life sciences and medicine
- QS Agriculture and Forestry: 57 (2023)
- QS Life Sciences & Medicine: 451-500 (2023)
- THE Life Sciences: 801-1000 (2023)

Global – Science and engineering
- QS Chemistry: 451-500 (2023)
- QS Engineering & Tech.: 451-500 (2017)
- THE Computer Science: 801+ (2023)
- THE Engineering: 1001+ (2023)

Regional – Overall
- QS Asia: =155 (2025)
- THE Asia: 501+ (2022)
- THE Emerging Economies: 501+ (2023)
- USNWR Asia: =291 (2021)

National – Overall
- QS National: =5 (2021)
- THE National: 11 (2023)
- USNWR National: 4 (2021)

National – Science and engineering
- THE Computer Science: 5 (2023)
- THE Engineering: 10 (2023)
- THE Physical Sciences: 7 (2023)

The QS World University Rankings 2021 ranked Kasetsart University 149th in Asia and 801-1000th in the world. For the QS World University Rankings by Subject 2021, the university was ranked 63rd in Agriculture & Forestry, 301-305th in Environmental Studies, 351-400th in Engineering - Chemical, 451-500th in Biological Sciences, Chemistry and Engineering - Mechanical, Aeronautical & Manufacturing, and 501-550th in Business & Management Studies. Kasetsart University was ranked 29th in Agriculture and Forestry worldwide in the QS World University Rankings 2017. It was ranked in the 651-700 range in the QS World University Rankings 2015–2016.

The Times Higher Education World University Rankings 2017–2018 ranked Kasetsart University in the 800-1000 tier in the world and 251-300th in the Emerging Economies. Moreover, the university was ranked 601-800th in Computer Science and Life Sciences, 601th+ in Business & Economics and Social Sciences, 801-1000th in Engineering & Technology, 1001+ in Physical Sciences by THE World University Rankings 2021 by subject.

=== Research ===
- Kasetsart University Research and Development Institute

Kasetsart University Research and Development Institute (KURDI) administers and coordinates research projects and research efforts.

- Institute of Food Research and Product Development

The Institute of Food Research and Product Development (IFRPD), is a science and food technology research institute, with the mandate to provide information and services to society as well as research in support of governmental policies to resolve the country's economic problems related to agricultural products.

- Kasetsart Agricultural and Agro-Industrial Product Improvement Institute

Kasetsart Agricultural and Agro-Industrial Product Improvement Institute (KAPI), is an agricultural and agro-industrial product research institute, established on 29 July 1991 to research and develop quality standards in non-food innovation.

- Kasetsart University Institute for Advanced Studies

Kasetsart University Institute for Advanced Studies (KUIAS) consists of four research centers: the Center for Advanced Studies for Agriculture and Food; the Center for Advanced Studies in Tropical Natural Resources; the Center for Advanced Studies in Nanotechnology for Chemical, Food and Agricultural Industries; and the Center for Advanced Studies In Industrial Technology. They are responsible for carrying out targeted research initiatives.

- Princess Sirindhorn International Center for Research Development and Technology Transfer

Princess Sirindhorn International Center for Research Development and Technology Transfer (PSIC) is an agency established through a collaboration between the Bureau of the Royal Household and Kasetsart University with tasks in the royal projects according to Princess Maha Chakri Sirindhorn and the royal family in supporting and coordinating research, development and technology transfer at the national and international level. PSIC has visions to improve quality of life and well-being, promote knowledge to the disadvantaged, cooperate with the government, private sector and international organizations, create opportunities for people in remote areas.

- Center for Excellence in Silk

Housed at Kamphaeng Saen campus, the center is a provider of silkworm eggs and know-how to Thai farmers.

- Research Stations

Kasetsart University have research and training stations under supervision of Faculty of Agriculture, Faculty of Fisheries, Faculty of Forestry and Kamphaeng Saen campus located in various areas throughout Thailand, such as Faculty of Agriculture's research stations at Pak Chong, Thap Kwang, Khok Charoen, Phaniat, Khao Hin Son, Phetchabun, Doi Pui, Faculty of Fisheries's research stations at Si Racha, Khlong Wan, Samut Songkhram, Kamphaeng Saen, Ranong, Faculty of Forestry's research and training stations at Chiang Mai, Lampang (Huay Tak), Wang Nam Khiao, Hat Wanakon, Phang Nga, Trat and Kamphaeng Saen campus's research stations at Kamphaeng Saen, Kanchanaburi and Prachuap Khiri Khan.

== International programs ==
=== Undergraduate programs ===
Undergraduate programs
Campus	Faculty	Degree	Program	Duration
Bangkhen	Agriculture	B.S.	Tropical Agriculture (BSTA)	4 years
Bangkhen	Agro-Industry	B.S.	Agro-Industrial Innovation and Technology (AIIP)	4 years
Bangkhen	Business Administration	B.B.A.	Business Administration (BBA): Business Administration; Finance	4 years
Bangkhen	Business Administration	B.B.A.	Marketing (KUBIM)	4 years
Bangkhen	Economics	B.A.	Entrepreneurial Economics (EEBA): Economics of Agricultural Business and Food; Economics of Finance for Entrepreneurs; Economics of Logistics; Economics of Tourism and Hospitality	4 years
Bangkhen	Economics	B.Econ.	Economics (BEcon): Business Economics; Economic Theory; Economics of Development and Planning; Human Resources and Industrial Economics; International Economics; Monetary Economics and Public Finance; Natural Resources and Environmental Economics; Quantitative Economics	4 years
Bangkhen	Engineering	B.Eng. + B.B.A.	Aerospace Engineering and Business Management (IDDP) (Dual degree program in partnership with the RMIT University)	5 years
Bangkhen	Engineering	B.Eng. (IUP)	Electrical Engineering: Communication Engineering (COMMU); Innovation and Intelligent Robotics (EIIR)	4 years
Bangkhen	Engineering	B.Eng. (IUP)	Computer Engineering	4 years
Bangkhen	Engineering	B.Eng. (IUP)	Electrical Mechanical Manufacturing Engineering	4 years
Bangkhen	Engineering	B.Eng. (IUP)	Environmental Engineering	4 years
Bangkhen	Engineering	B.Eng. (IUP)	Industrial Engineering	4 years
Bangkhen	Engineering	B.Eng. (IUP)	Mechanical Engineering	4 years
Bangkhen	Engineering	B.Eng. (IUP)	Software and Knowledge Engineering	4 years
Bangkhen	Humanities	B.A.	Communicative Thai Language for Foreigners	4 years
Bangkhen	Humanities	B.A.	Integrated Tourism Management (KITMAN)	4 years
Bangkhen	Science	B.S.	Biological Science and Technology (BioSciTech)	4 years
Bangkhen	Science	B.S.	Integrated Chemistry (KUIC)	4 years
Bangkhen	Science	B.S.	Polymer Science and Technology (Collaboration with the University of Akron)	4 years
Sriracha	Engineering at Sriracha	B.Eng.	Robotics and Automation Systems Engineering (RASE)	4 years
Sriracha	Management Sciences	B.B.A.		
Sriracha	Management Sciences	B.B.A.	International Business	4 years
Sriracha	Management Sciences	B.B.A.	Finance and Investment	4 years
Sriracha	Management Sciences	B.B.A.	Hospitality Industry Management (HIM) With two selective concentrations: Hotel Management (HM); Contemporary Tourism Management (CTM)	4 years

=== Postgraduate programs ===
Postgraduate programs
Campus	Faculty	Degree	Program	Study Mode
Bangkhen	Agriculture	M.S. / Ph.D.	Tropical Agriculture: Tropical Agriculture Management; Sustainable Agriculture	Full-time
Bangkhen	Agro-Industry	M.S. / Ph.D.	Biotechnology	Full-time
Bangkhen	Agro-Industry	M.S. / Ph.D.	Food Science	Full-time
Bangkhen	Business Administration	M.B.A.	Business Administration (KIMBA)	Part-time
Bangkhen	Economics	M.S. / Ph.D.	Agricultural and Resource Economics (MAB)	Full-time
Bangkhen	Education	Ph.D.	Science Education	Full-time
Bangkhen	Engineering	M.Eng.	Civil Engineering	Full-time
Bangkhen	Engineering	M.Eng.	Engineering Management	Full-time
Bangkhen	Engineering	M.Eng.	Information and Communication Technology for Embedded Systems (ICTES)	Full-time
Bangkhen	Engineering	M.Eng.	Sustainable Energy and Resources Engineering	Full-time
Bangkhen	Engineering	M.Eng. / Ph.D.	Industrial Engineering	Full-time
Bangkhen	Fisheries	M.S. / Ph.D.	Fishery Science and Technology (Dual degree program in partnership with the Ocean University of China)	Full-time
Bangkhen	Forestry	M.S.	Tropical Forestry	Full-time
Bangkhen	Humanities	Ph.D.	English for International Communication (EIC)	Part-time
Bangkhen	Science	M.S.	Life Sciences	Full-time
Bangkhen	Science	Ph.D.	Bioscience	Full-time
Bangkhen	Veterinary Medicine	M.S. / Ph.D.	Bioveterinary Science	Full-time
Kamphaeng Saen	Agriculture at Kamphaeng Saen	M.S.	Agricultural Research and Development	Full-time
Kamphaeng Saen	Agriculture at Kamphaeng Saen	Ph.D.	Agricultural Sciences	Full-time
Kamphaeng Saen	Sports Science	M.S. / Ph.D.	Sport Management	Full-time

== Scholarships ==
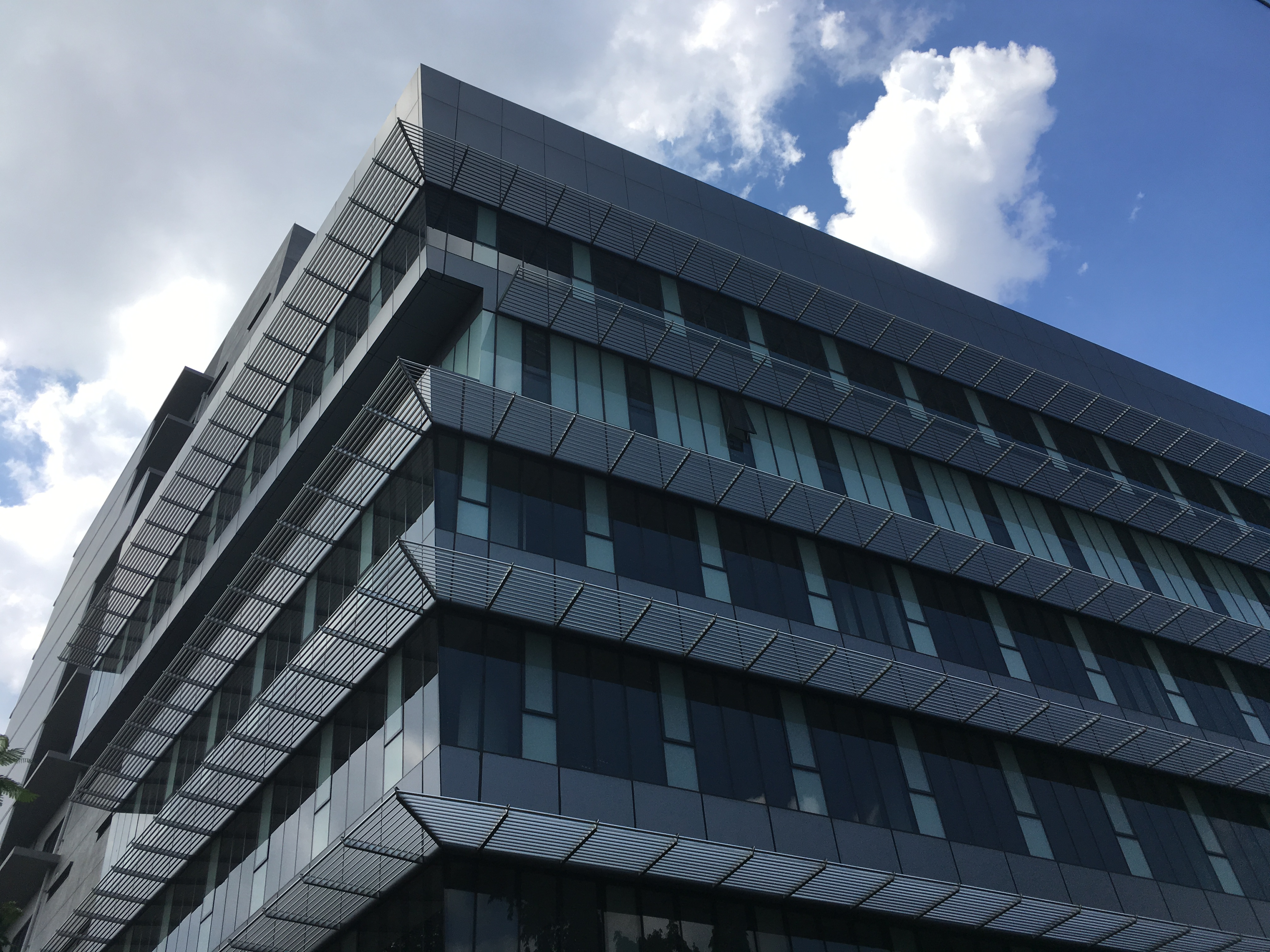
Princess Chulabhorn Science Research Centre, Faculty of Science at Bangkhen

Kasetsart University and donor agencies offers a wide range of scholarships for undergraduate and graduate:

=== Undergraduate scholarships ===
- 5As Scholarship
- Bhumibol Scholarship
- Prince Dipangkorn Rasmijoti Celebration Scholarship
- Professor Prasert na Nagara Scholarship
- Professor Phanom Samitanon Scholarship
- Ajinomoto Foundation Scholarship
- Bank of Thailand Scholarship
- Isuzu Group Foundation Scholarship
- Siam Commercial Bank Scholarship
- Thaioil Scholarship

=== Graduate scholarships ===
- Teaching Assistant Scholarship
- Research Assistant Scholarship
- Graduate Thesis Scholarship
- Research Publication Scholarship
- The Royal Golden Jubilee Ph.D. Program Scholarship
- The Thailand Research Fund Scholarship
- The National Research Council of Thailand Scholarship
- The National Science and Technology Development Agency Scholarship
- The Office of the Higher Education Commission Scholarship
- The Royal Bangkok Sports Club Scholarship
- Graduate School International Student Scholarship
- Graduate School International Student Under the Double and Joint Degree Scholarship

== Student society ==
- Kasetsart University Student Council (KUSC) is a KU student organization as set out in the 1952 student constitution.
- Kasetsart University Student Administrative Board (KUSAB) represents KU student interests in academic, social, and recreational activities.
- Student Unions represents faculty student and responsible for ceremonies, volunteering and other student activities of each faculty.

== Honorary degrees ==
The university has given honorary degrees to heads of state and other dignitaries:

- Prince Philip, Duke of Edinburgh, 23 July 1983
- Fumihito, Prince Akishino, 8 March 2011
- Benigno Aquino III, 27 May 2011
- Mohammed bin Salman, 19 November 2022

== Notable alumni ==
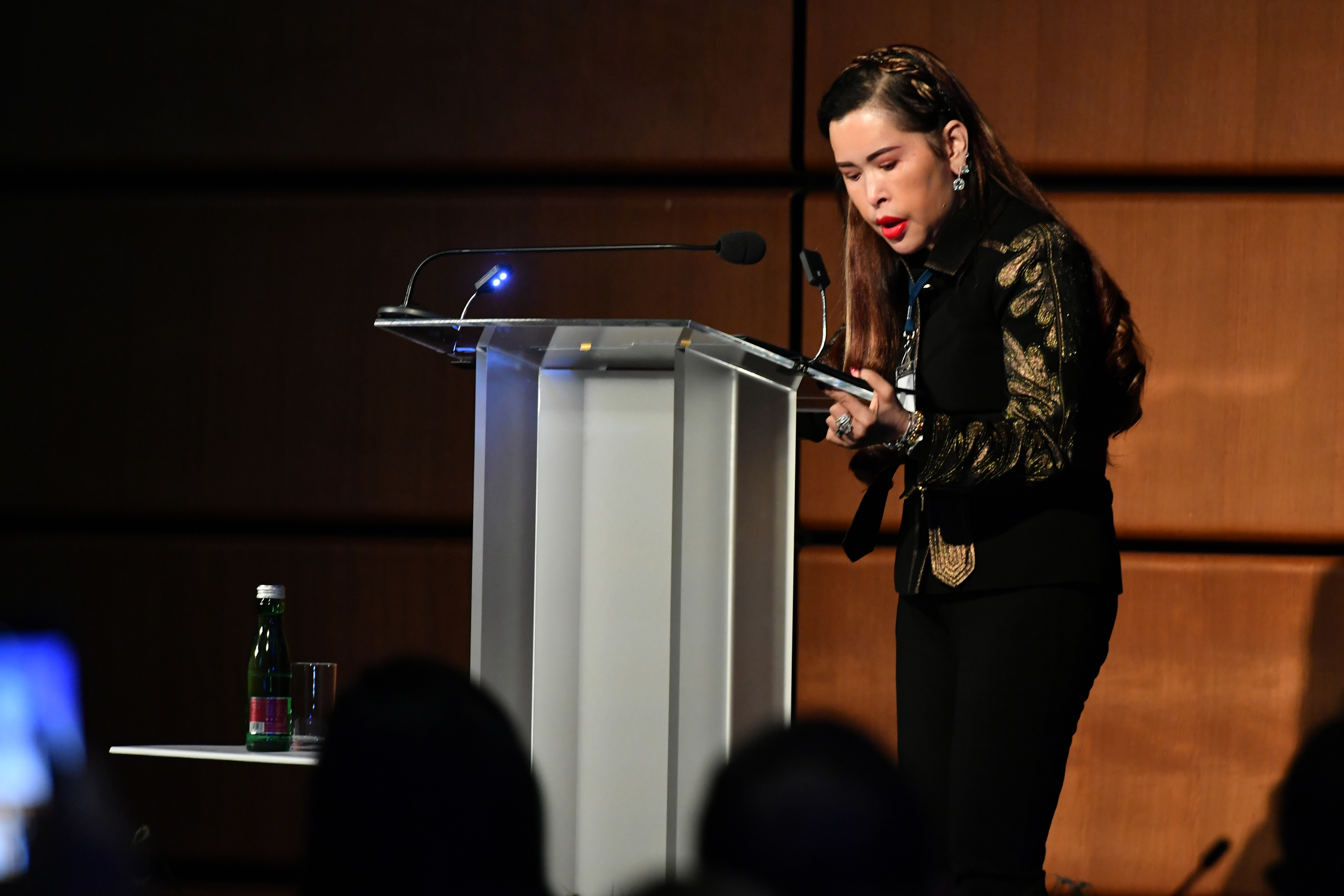
Princess Chulabhorn at the 63rd IAEA General Conference in Vienna

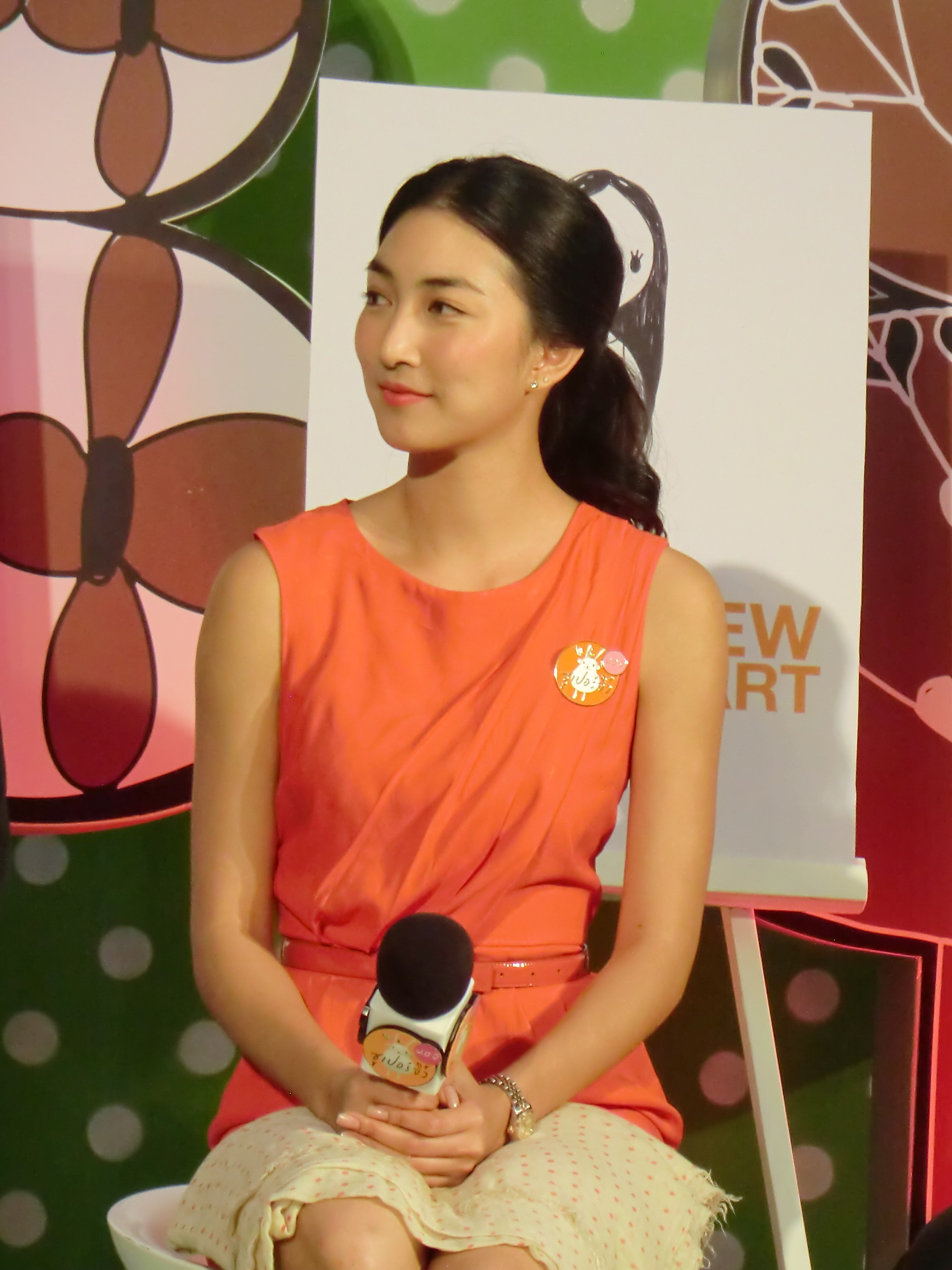
Khemanit Jamikorn

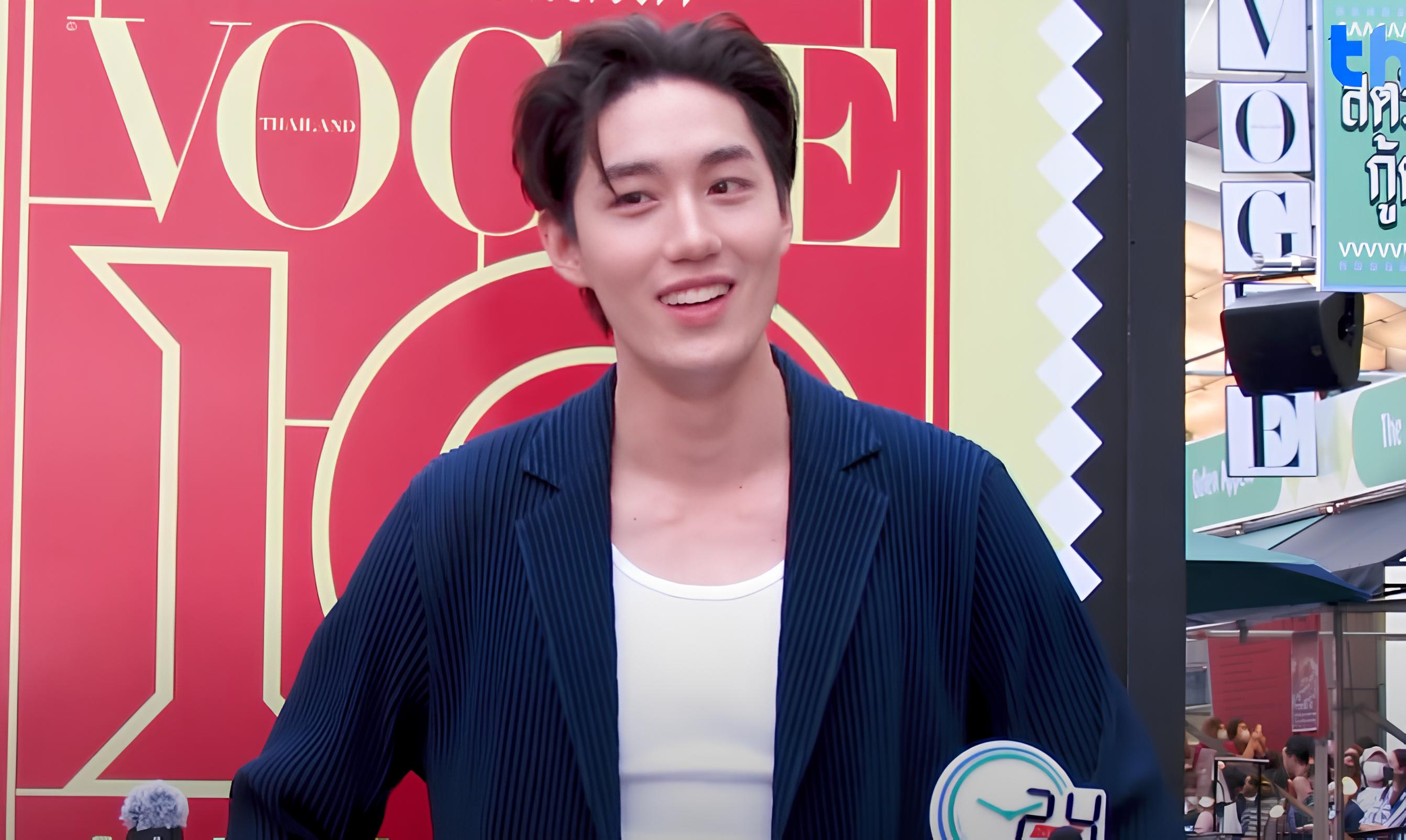
Thanapob Leeratanakachorn

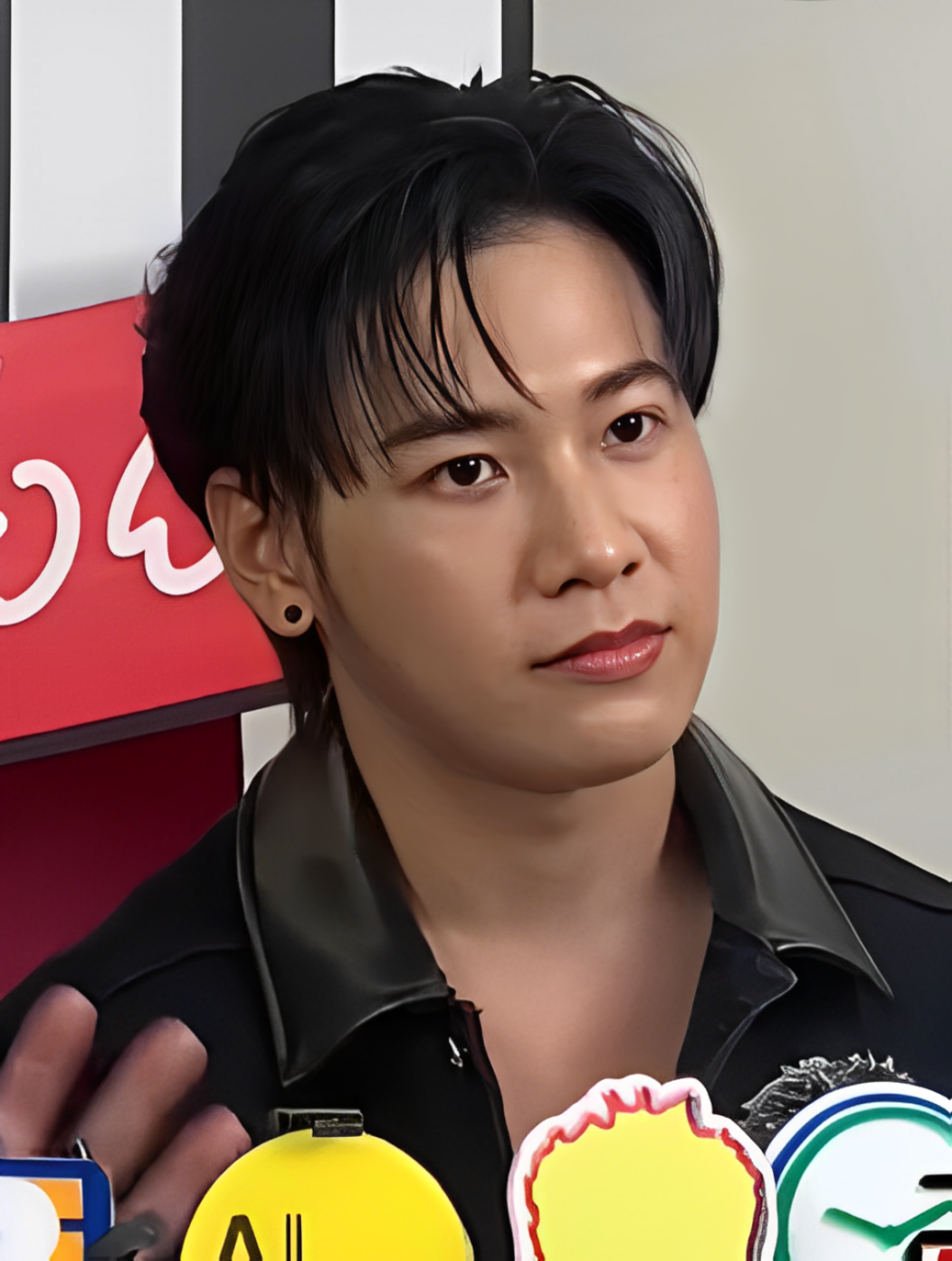
Prachaya Ruangroj

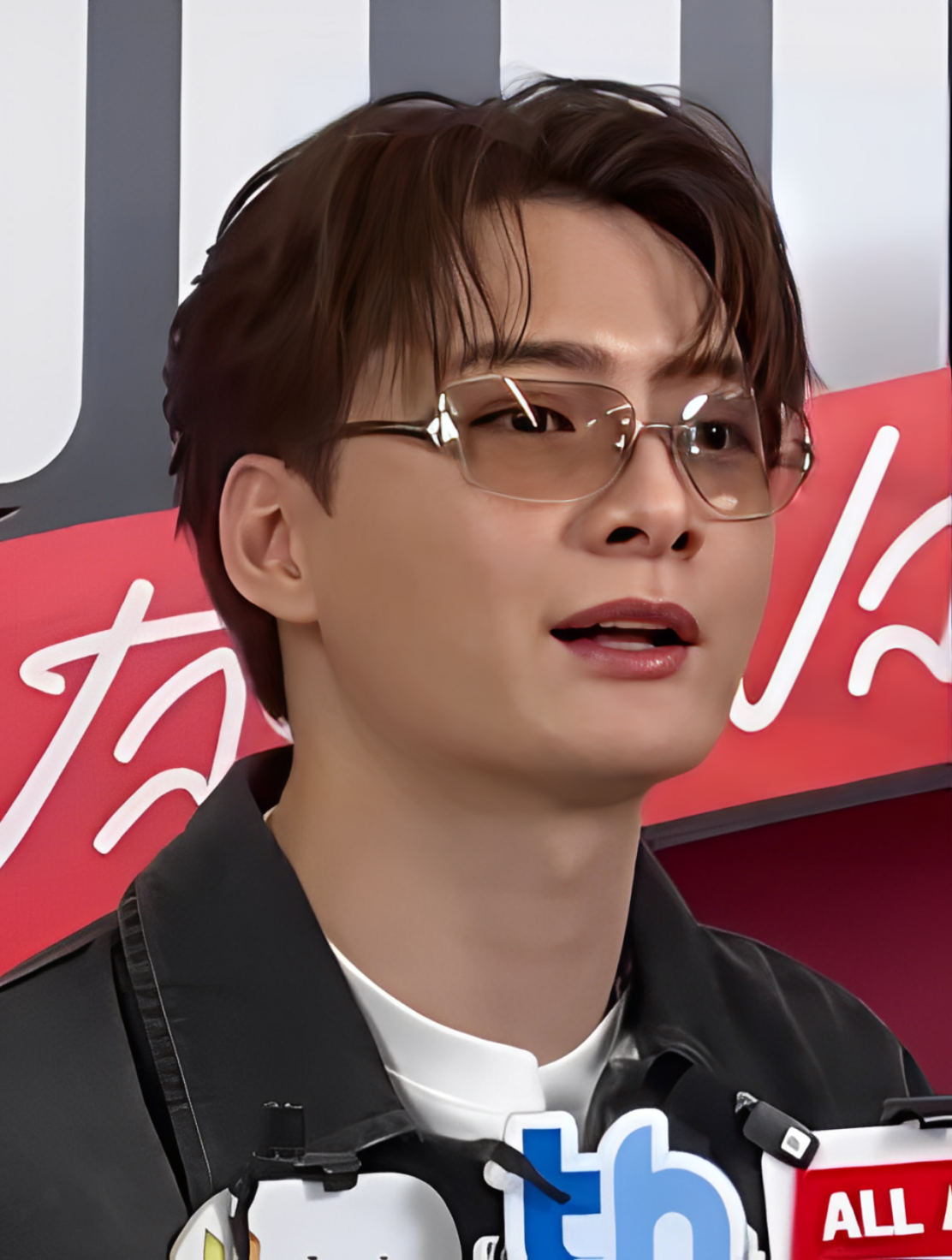
Perawat Sangpotirat

- Princess Chulabhorn, a Thai princess who was awarded the UNESCO Albert Einstein medal for her efforts in promoting scientific collaboration in 1986
- Srirasmi Suwadee, a former member of the royal family of Thailand
- Rapee Sagarik, a Thai horticulturist, botanist and orchid expert and the 7th president of Kasetsart University
- Theera Wongsamut, a former Minister of Agriculture and Cooperatives
- Seub Nakhasathien, a Thai conservationist who was well known for his efforts to protect nature
- Prapat Panyachatraksa, a former Deputy Minister of Agriculture and Cooperatives and former Minister of Natural Resources and Environment
- Sutham Sangprathum, a former Deputy Minister of Interior, former Deputy Minister of Education and former Minister of University Affairs
- Pornchai Mongkhonvanit, the president of Siam University and a former president of International Association of University Presidents
- Chavalit Vidthayanon, a Thai ichthyologist and senior researcher of biodiversity of WWF Thailand
- Sunanta Kangvalkulkij, a Thai diplomat and the chairperson of the General Council of the World Trade Organization for 2020
- Kiattipong Radchatagriengkai, the head coach of the Thailand women's national volleyball team
- Ratthasart Korrasud, a Thai pop singer, actor and IT/digital media expert
- Navin Yavapolkul, a Thai singer, actor and lecturer of economics at Kasetsart University
- Janjira Janchome, a Thai beauty queen and the Miss Thailand Universe 2002
- Khemanit Jamikorn, a Thai TV actress, singer and model
- Nat Thewphaingam, a Thai singer, actor, model, presenter and the winner of the 5th season of reality talent show True Academy Fantasia
- Pen-ek Karaket, a Thai taekwondo practitioner who competed at the 2012 Summer Olympics in the under 58 kg weight class
- Darvid Kreepolrerk, a Thai actor and singer, best known as Forth in the television series 2 Moons
- Napat Injaiuea, a Thai singer-songwriter, actor, writer and the winner of the 6th season of reality talent show The Star
- Suppasit Jongcheveevat, a Thai actor and model
- Weluree Ditsayabut, a Thai beauty queen and the former Miss Universe Thailand 2014
- Punika Kulsoontornrut, a Thai beauty queen and the Miss Earth Thailand 2013
- Thanapob Leeratanakachorn, a Thai actor and model
- Prachaya Ruangroj, a Thai actor and model
- Jirakit Thawornwong, a Thai actor and singer
- Supassara Thanachat, a Thai actor and model, best known as Sprite in Hormones: The Series
- Perawat Sangpotirat, a Thai actor and model
- Thanapon Jarujitranon, a Thai actor and singer, best known as Beam in 2 Moons
- Worranit Thawornwong, a Thai actress and model
- Krit Amnuaydechkorn, a Thai actor and model
- Anchana Heemmina, a Thai human rights activist
- Chawarin Perdpiriyawong, a Thai actor and singer
- Tawinan Anukoolprasert, a Thai actor and singer
- Jespipat Tilapornputt, a Thai actor and model
- Save Saisawat, a Thai actor and model
- Thanaphon U-sinsap, a Thai actor and model
- Tharatorn Jantharaworakarn, a Thai actor and singer
- Thanachai Sakchaicharoenkul, a Thai actor, singer and ice hockey player

== Partner institutions ==
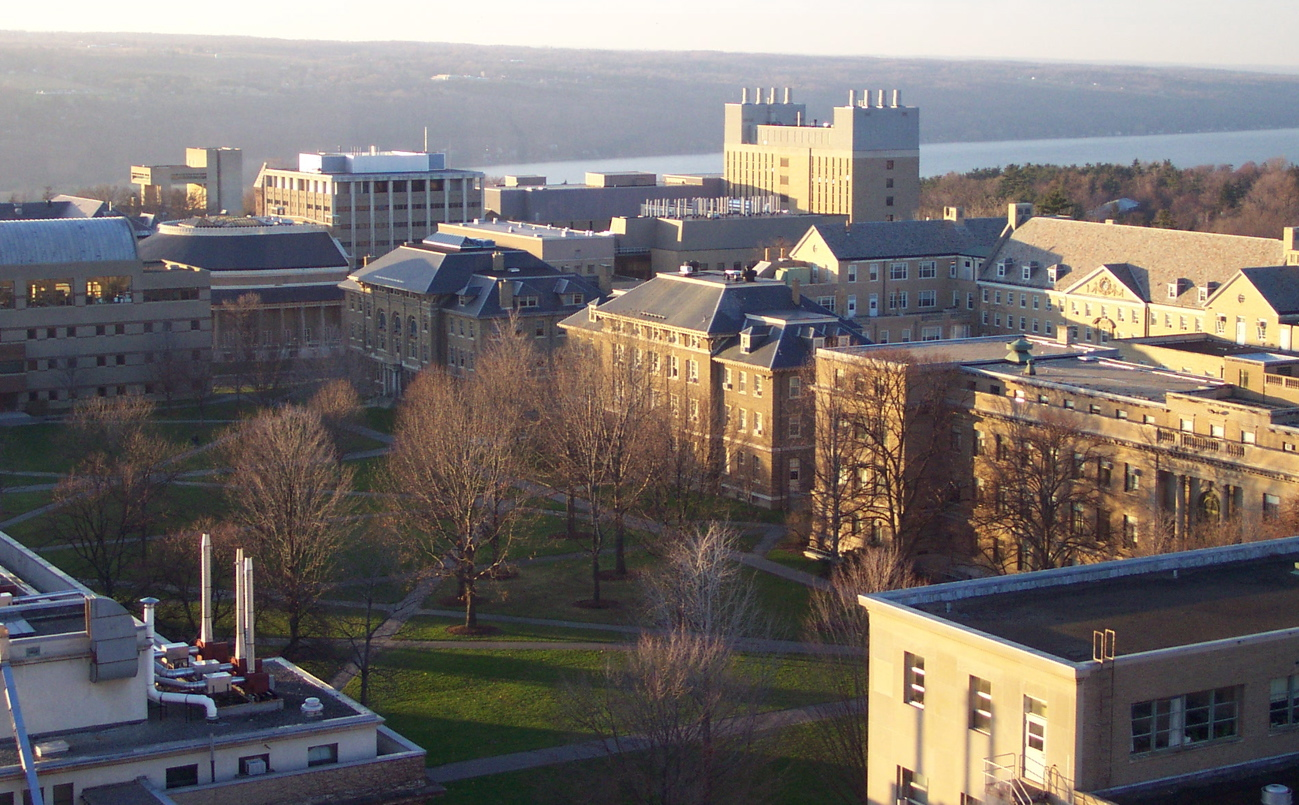
Cornell University is one of Kasetsart University's partner universities

Some of Kasetsart University's partner institutions:

- China Agricultural University
- Cornell University
- Huaqiao University
- Korea University
- KTH Royal Institute of Technology
- Kyoto University
- Massey University
- Michigan State University
- Nagoya University
- National Chung Hsing University
- National University of Singapore
- Ocean University of China
- Osaka University
- Purdue University
- RMIT University
- Università della Svizzera italiana
- University of British Columbia
- University of California, Davis
- University of Hohenheim
- University of Melbourne
- University of Montpellier
- University of Oxford
- University of the Philippines Los Baños
- University of Strathclyde
- University of Reading
- University of Vienna
- Waseda University
- Yale University
- Yonsei University
- Zhejiang University

== Wildlife at Bangkhen ==
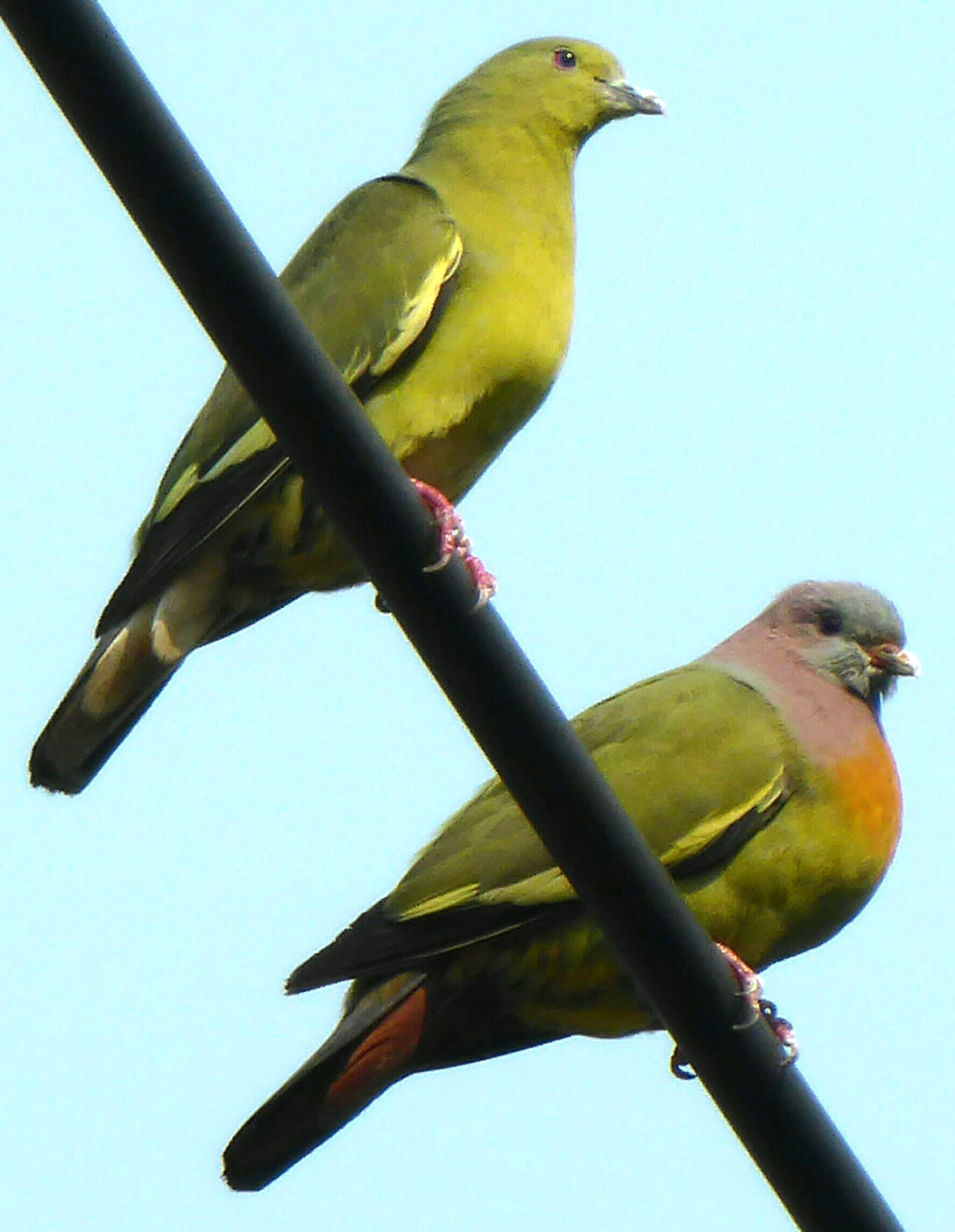
Female and male pink-necked green pigeons at Bangkhen campus

The Bangkhen campus hosts the most diverse avifauna of any campus in Bangkok. The following species of bird can usually be found on campus all year round: little cormorant, Javan pond-heron, little egret, black-crowned night heron, Asian openbill, white-breasted waterhen, bronze-winged jacana, rock pigeon, spotted dove, zebra dove, red collared dove, pink-necked green pigeon, plaintive cuckoo, common koel, greater coucal, Indian roller, coppersmith barbet, Asian palm-swift, house swift, small minivet, common iora, streak-eared bulbul, yellow-vented bulbul, sooty-headed bulbul, large-billed crow, oriental magpie-robin, pied fantail, black-collared starling, Asian pied starling, common myna, white-vented myna, plain prinia, common tailorbird, brown-throated sunbird, olive-backed sunbird, scarlet-backed flowerpecker, white-rumped munia, scaly-breasted munia, Eurasian tree sparrow, house sparrow, Java sparrow. Common winter (generally October–March) visitors: Chinese pond-heron, intermediate egret, barn swallow (August–May), red-rumped swallow, blue-tailed bee-eater, red-breasted flycatcher, ashy drongo, brown shrike, black-naped oriole. Species which are seen there less often (but all year round but some very rarely): lesser whistling duck, cattle egret, great white egret, purple heron, black-winged stilt, red-wattled lapwing, common kingfisher, black-capped kingfisher, stork-billed kingfisher, vernal hanging-parrot, hoopoe, collared scops-owl, black drongo, green-billed malkoha, edible-nest swiftlet, ashy woodswallow, Asian golden weaver. Less common winter visitors or passage migrants: Eurasian kestrel, dark-sided flycatcher, verditer flycatcher.

== See also ==
- List of universities in Thailand
- List of colleges and universities
- Kasetsart University Laboratory School
