= Bo Nok railway station =

Railway station in Bo Nok, Thailand

Bo Nok บ่อนอก
- Station in 2025

General information
- Location: Prachuap Khiri Khan Local Road No. 1020, Mu 6 (Ban Bo Nok), Bo Nok Subdistrict, Prachuap Khiri Khan City
- Owner: State Railway of Thailand
- Line: Southern Line
- Platforms: 2
- Tracks: 2

Other information
- Station code: บน.

History
- Opened: 1 June 1914

Services
Preceding station	State Railway of Thailand	Following station
Kui Buri towards Hua Lamphong or Krung Thep Aphiwat	Southern Line	Thung Mamao towards Su-ngai Kolok
Location

Bo Nok station (Thai: สถานีบ่อนอก) is a railway station located in Bo Nok Subdistrict, Prachuap Khiri Khan City, Prachuap Khiri Khan. It is a class 3 railway station located 278.85 km (173.3 mi) from Thon Buri railway station.

The station opened on 1 June 1914 as part of the Southern Line extension from Wang Phong to Prachuap Khiri Khan. The station was rebuilt with elevated platforms and relocated to the opposite side in 2022 as part of the double-track section from Nakhon Pathom to Chumphon.

== Services ==
- Ordinary 251/252 Thon Buri - Prachuap Khiri Khan - Thon Buri
- Ordinary 254/255 Lang Suan - Thon Buri - Lang Suan

== Gallery ==
Renovated station building
