= Whagor railway halt =

Railway stop in Khlong Wan, Thailand

Whagor หว้ากอ

General information
- Location: Mu 4 (Ban Whagor), Khlong Wan Subdistrict, Prachuap Khiri Khan City
- Owner: State Railway of Thailand
- Line: Southern Line
- Platforms: 1
- Tracks: 1

Other information
- Station code: ห ้.

Services
Preceding station	State Railway of Thailand	Following station
Nong Hin towards Hua Lamphong or Krung Thep Aphiwat	Southern Line	Wang Duan towards Su-ngai Kolok
Location

Whagor Railway Halt is a railway halt located in Khlong Wan Subdistrict, Prachuap Khiri Khan City, Prachuap Khiri Khan Province. It is located 313.42 km (194.8 mi) from Thon Buri Railway Station

== Train services ==
- Ordinary 254/255 Lang Suan-Thon Buri-Lang Suan
