= Kui Buri railway station =

Railway station in Khui Buri, Thailand

Kui Buri กุยบุรี
- Station in 2025

General information
- Location: Prachuap Khiri Khan Local Road No. 2005, Kui Buri Subdistrict, Kui Buri District, Prachuap Khiri Khan
- Owner: State Railway of Thailand
- Line: Southern Line
- Platforms: 3
- Tracks: 4

Other information
- Station code: กย.

History
- Opened: 1 June 1914
- Former names: Kui

Services
Preceding station	State Railway of Thailand	Following station
Sam Krathai towards Hua Lamphong or Krung Thep Aphiwat	Southern Line	Bo Nok towards Su-ngai Kolok
Location

Kui Buri railway station (Thai: สถานีกุยบุรี) is a railway station located in Kui Buri Subdistrict, Kui Buri District, Prachuap Khiri Khan. It is a class 2 railway station located 271.337 km (168.6 mi) from Thon Buri railway station and serves as the main station of Kui Buri District.

== History ==
The station opened on 1 June 1914 as part of the Southern Line extension from Wang Phong to Prachuap Khiri Khan. The station was simply called Kui (Thai: กุย) before changing to Kui Buri to match with the district name on 26 August 1960.

The station was rebuilt in 2022 as part of the double-track section from Nakhon Pathom to Chumphon. A new station building and elevated platforms were built. The original station building was preserved and placed nearby the new station.

== Services ==
- Rapid No. 167/168 Krung Thep Aphiwat - Kantang - Krung Thep Aphiwat
- Ordinary 251/252 Thon Buri - Prachuap Khiri Khan - Thon Buri
- Ordinary 254/255 Lang Suan - Thon Buri - Lang Suan

== Gallery ==
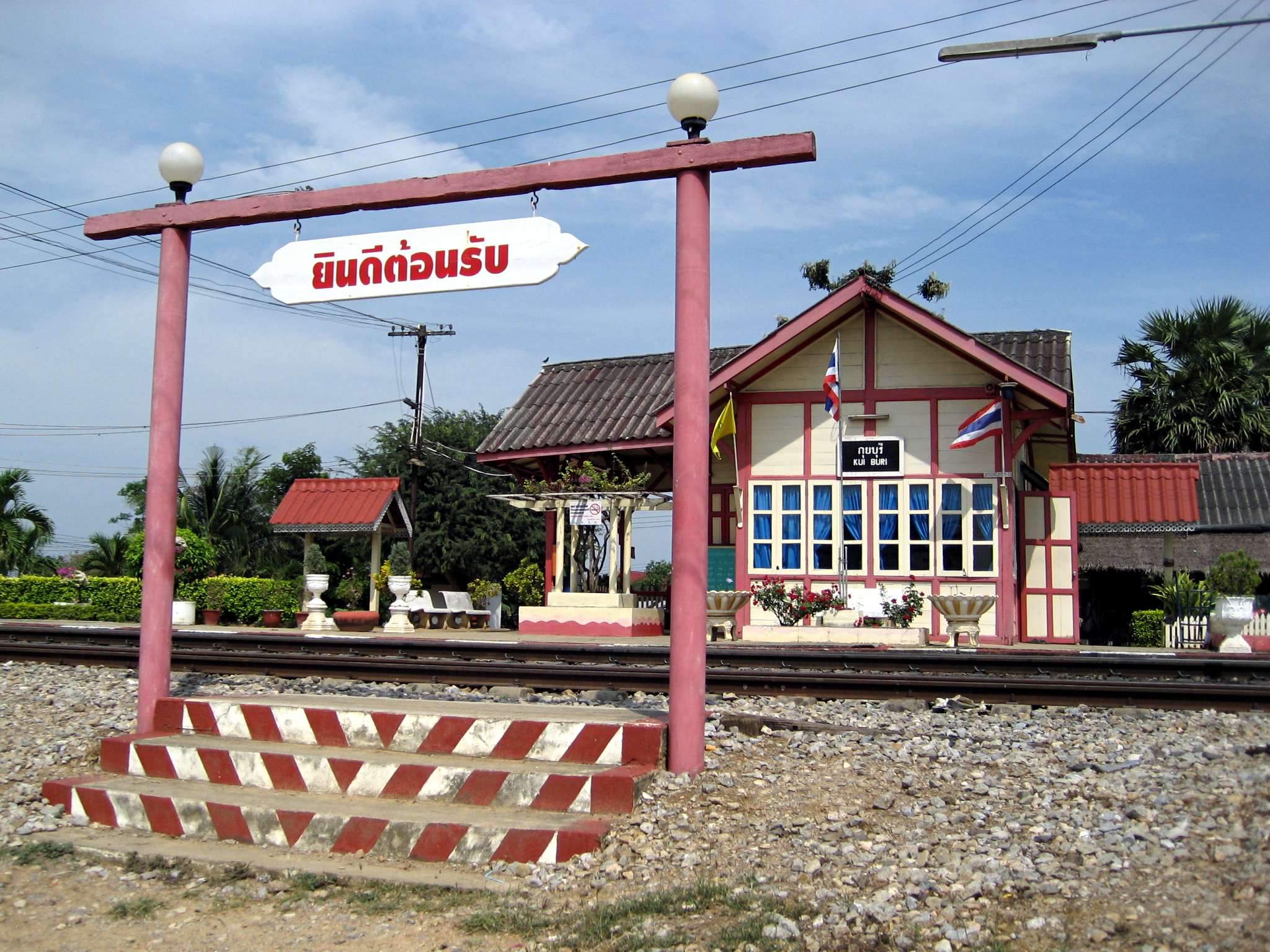
Old station in 2008
