= Khan Kradai railway station =

Railway station in Ao Noi, Thailand

Khan Kradai คั่นกระได
- Station in 2025

General information
- Location: Prachuap Khiri Khan Local Road No.1034, Mu 3 (Ban Khan Kradai), Ao Noi Subdistrict, Prachuap Khiri Khan City
- Owner: State Railway of Thailand
- Line: Southern Line
- Platforms: 2
- Tracks: 2

Other information
- Station code: กด.

History
- Opened: 1 June 1914

Services
Preceding station	State Railway of Thailand	Following station
Thung Mamao towards Hua Lamphong or Krung Thep Aphiwat	Southern Line	Prachuap Khiri Khan towards Su-ngai Kolok
Location

Khan Kradai railway station is a railway station located in Ao Noi Subdistrict, Prachuap Khiri Khan City, Prachuap Khiri Khan. It is a class 3 railway station located 294.768 km (183.2 mi) from Thon Buri railway station.

The station opened on 1 June 1914 as part of the Southern Line extension from Wang Phong to Prachuap Khiri Khan. The station was rebuilt with elevated platforms and relocated to the opposite side in 2022 as part of the double-track section from Nakhon Pathom to Chumphon.

== Train services ==
- Ordinary 251/252 Thon Buri - Prachuap Khiri Khan - Thon Buri
- Ordinary 254/255 Lang Suan - Thon Buri - Lang Suan

== Gallery ==
Renovated station building
