= Wang Duan railway station =

Railway station in Huai Sai, Thailand

Coordinates: 11.6891°N 99.7234°E

Wang Duan วังด้วน

General information
- Location: Mu 9 (Ban Wang Duan), Huai Sai Subdistrict, Prachuap Khiri Khan City
- Owner: State Railway of Thailand
- Line: Southern Line
- Platforms: 1
- Tracks: 2

Other information
- Station code: วด.

Services
Preceding station	State Railway of Thailand	Following station
Whagor Halt towards Hua Lamphong or Krung Thep Aphiwat	Southern Line	Huai Yang towards Su-ngai Kolok
Location

Wang Duan railway station is a railway station located in Huai Sai Subdistrict, Prachuap Khiri Khan City, Prachuap Khiri Khan. It is a class 3 railway station located 318.272 km (197.8 mi) from Thon Buri railway station. It is the location of the narrowest part of Thailand, at about 10 km wide.

== Train services ==
- Ordinary 254/255 Lang Suan-Thon Buri-Lang Suan
