= Nong Hin railway station =

Thai railway station

Coordinates: 11.7419°N 99.7675°E

Nong Hin หนองหิน

General information
- Location: Prachuap Khiri Khan Local Road No. 1041, Mu 2 (Ban Nong Hin), Khlong Wan Subdistrict, Prachuap Khiri Khan City
- Owner: State Railway of Thailand
- Line: Southern Line
- Platforms: 1
- Tracks: 2

Other information
- Station code: นห.

Services
Preceding station	State Railway of Thailand	Following station
Prachuap Khiri Khan towards Hua Lamphong or Krung Thep Aphiwat	Southern Line	Whagor Halt towards Su-ngai Kolok
Location

Nong Hin railway station is a railway station located in Khlong Wan Subdistrict, Prachuap Khiri Khan City, Prachuap Khiri Khan. It is a class 3 railway station located 310.372 km (192.9 mi) from Thon Buri railway station.

Due to minimal passenger usage, Nong Hin is being converted railway halt and will officially be in operation when the double tracking of the line section is completed.

== Train services ==
- Ordinary 254/255 Lang Suan-Thon Buri-Lang Suan
