= Thung Mamao railway station =

Railway station in Ao Noi, Thailand

Thung Mamao ทุ่งมะเม่า
- Station in 2025

General information
- Location: Prachuap Khiri Khan Local Road No. 3088, Ban Thung Mamao, Ao Noi Subdistrict, Prachuap Khiri Khan City
- Owner: State Railway of Thailand
- Line: Southern Line
- Platforms: 2
- Tracks: 3

Other information
- Station code: มเ.

Services
| Preceding station | State Railway of Thailand | Following station |
|---|---|---|
| Bo Nok towards Hua Lamphong or Krung Thep Aphiwat | Southern Line | Khan Kradai towards Su-ngai Kolok |
Location

Thung Mamao railway station (Thai: สถานีทุ่งมะเม่า) is a railway station located in Ao Noi Subdistrict, Prachuap Khiri Khan City, Prachuap Khiri Khan. It is a class 3 railway station located 289.034 km (179.6 mi) from Thon Buri railway station.

The station first opened as a railway halt some time during 1917-1921 It was upgraded to a staffed station on 18 February 1982. The station was rebuilt with elevated platforms in 2022 as part of the double-track section from Nakhon Pathom to Chumphon.

== Train services ==
- Ordinary 251/252 Thon Buri - Prachuap Khiri Khan - Thon Buri
- Ordinary 254/255 Lang Suan - Thon Buri - Lang Suan

== Gallery ==
Current station building
