= Faculty of Science, Kasetsart University =

Collegiate research university in Bangkok, Thailand

Faculty of Science Kasetsart University
- คณะวิทยาศาสตร์ มหาวิทยาลัยเกษตรศาสตร์
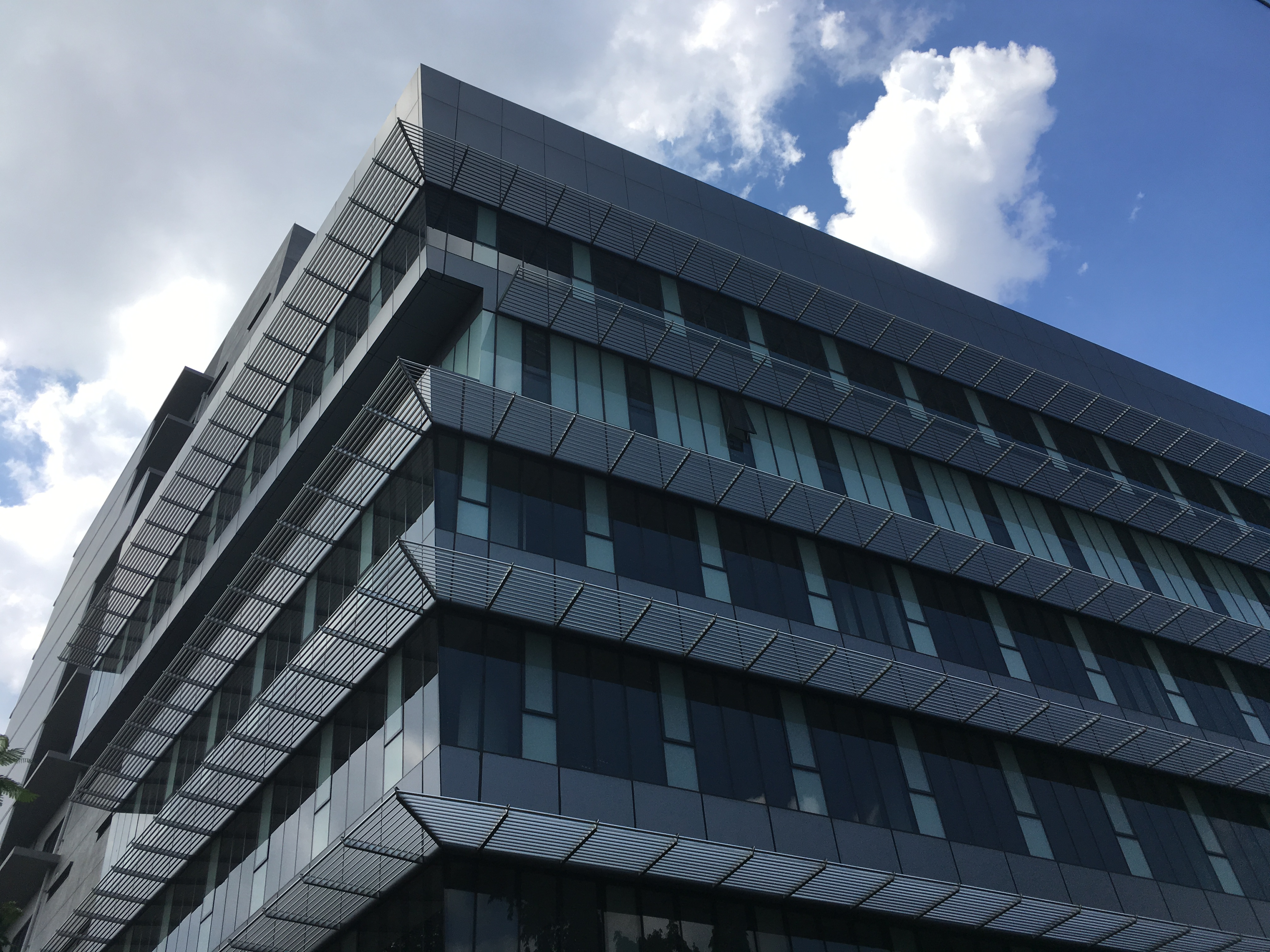
- Princess Chulabhorn Science Research Centre, Faculty of Science at Bangkhen
- Other names: Sci KU, Science KU
- Former names: Faculty of Science and Arts
- Type: National
- Established: March 9, 1966
- Parent institution: Kasetsart University
- Academic affiliations: ASAIHL
- Dean: Apisit Songsasen
- Location: Bangkok, Thailand; 13.844605°N 100.571845°E
- Campus: Urban
- Journal: KU Science Journal (unpublished)
- Colours: Blue
- Website: sci.ku.ac.th

The Faculty of Science, Kasetsart University (Thai: คณะวิทยาศาสตร์ มหาวิทยาลัยเกษตรศาสตร์) is located in Bangkok, Thailand. It offers a wide range of undergraduate, master's, and doctoral programs. The faculty has gained recognition for its academic excellence and has been consistently ranked among the top science schools in Thailand. In the QS World University Rankings by Subject, the Faculty of Science, Kasetsart University has achieved a position within the top 500 for Biological Sciences, Chemistry, and Computer Science & Information Systems.

The faculty is known for its distinguished faculty members, including Princess Chulabhorn, a scientist and member of the royal family. Princess Chulabhorn has received honors such as the UNESCO Albert Einstein medal for her contributions to the field of science.

== History ==
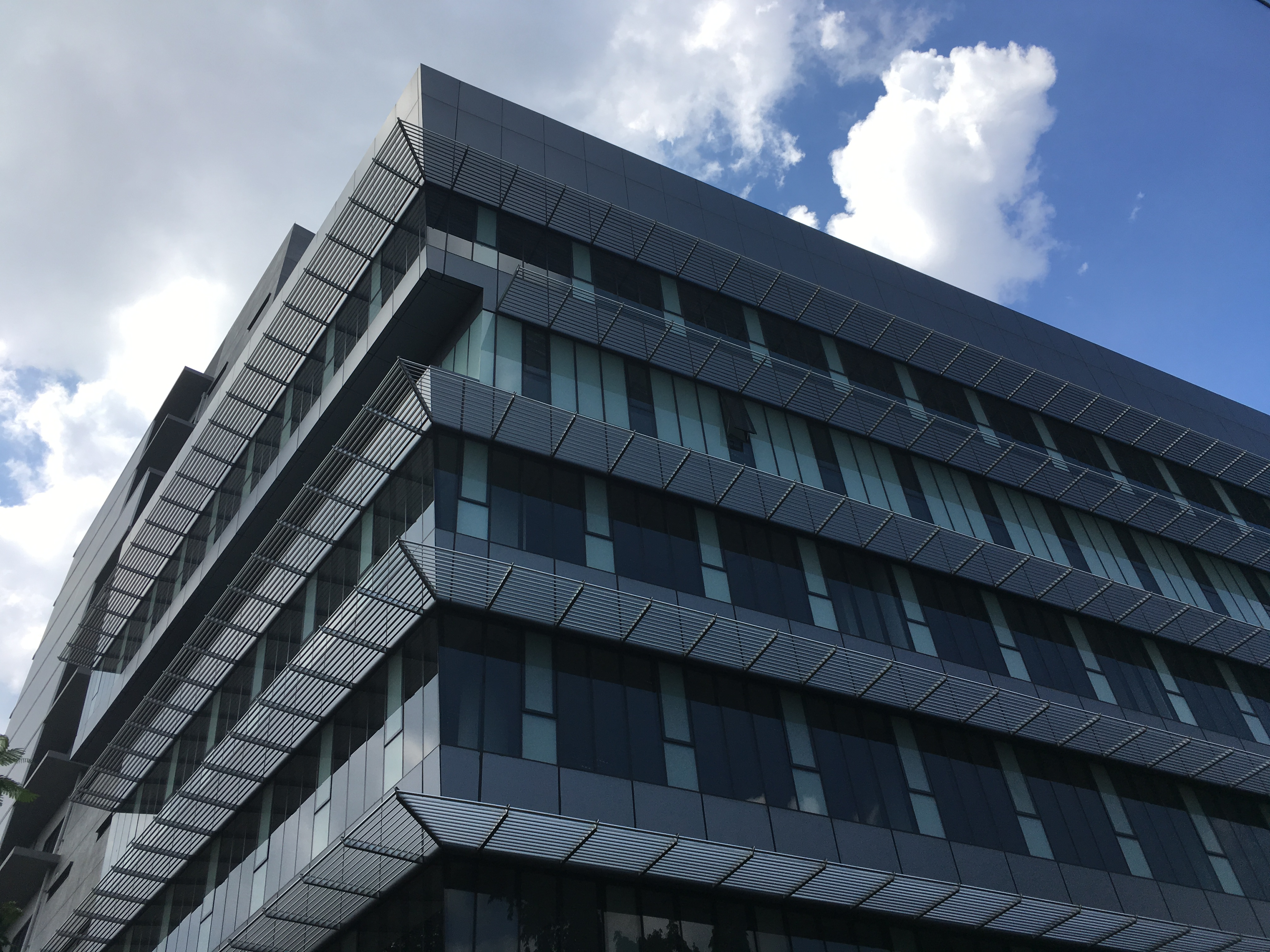
The Princess Chulabhorn Science Research Center (In Celebration of Princess Chulabhorn's 60th Birthday

Kasetsart University acknowledges the fundamental role of basic science as a cornerstone of higher education across all faculties. In line with this belief, the Faculty of Science and Arts was established in 1966. Subsequently, on June 17, 1981, the faculty underwent a name change and became officially known as the Faculty of Science.

== Academics ==
The Faculty consists of 13 departments: Mathematics, Chemistry, Biochemistry, Botany, Genetics, Microbiology, Zoology, Applied Radiation and Isotope, Physics, Materials Science, Earth Science, Computer Science, and Statistics. It is widely recognized within the academic community as a prominent institution in Thailand, particularly known for its research contributions in fields such as Biological Sciences, Physical Sciences, and Data Sciences, among others.

=== Degrees Offered ===
Undergraduate programs

- B.S. (Mathematics)
- B.S. (Chemistry)
- B.S. (Industrial Chemistry)
- B.S. (Integrated Chemistry) (International Program)
- B.S. (Biology)
- B.S. (Biochemistry)
- B.S. (Bioscience and Technology) (International Program)
- B.S. (Botany)
- B.S. (Genetics)
- B.S. (Microbiology)
- B.S. (Zoology)
- B.S. (Radiation Bioscience)
- B.S. (Physics)
- B.S. (Polymer Science and Technology) (International program)
- B.S. (Earth Sciences)
- B.S. (Computer Science)
- B.S. (Statistics)

Postgraduate programs

- M.S. (Mathematics)
- M.S. (Chemistry)
- M.S. (Biology)
- M.S. (Biochemistry)
- M.S. (Biomedical Data Science)
- M.S. (Botany)
- M.S. (Genetics)
- M.S. (Microbiology)
- M.S. (Zoology)
- M.S. (Life Science) (International Program)
- M.S. (Applied Radiation and Isotopes)
- M.S. (Physics)
- M.S. (Metrology)
- M.S. (Nanomaterials Science)
- M.S. (Earth Science and Technology)
- M.S. (Computer Science)
- M.S. (Statistics)
- Ph.D. (Chemistry)
- Ph.D. (Biochemistry)
- Ph.D. (Bioscience) (International Program)
- Ph.D. (Botany)
- Ph.D. (Genetics)
- Ph.D. (Microbiology)
- Ph.D. (Zoology)
- Ph.D. (Physics)
- Ph.D. (Nanomaterials Science)
- Ph.D. (Earth Science and Technology)
- Ph.D. (Computer Science)
- Ph.D. (Statistics)

=== Undergraduate degree program ===
Undergraduate students at the Faculty of Science, Kasetsart University complete their degree in four years. In the initial two years of study, students take courses in basic sciences, mathematics, English, and foundational disciplines.

The Faculty of Science, Kasetsart University offers undergraduate students the opportunity to engage in international exchange programs as part of its commitment to internationalizing education. The Faculty has established student exchange agreements with universities in the United States, Europe, and the Asia-Pacific region.

=== Academic postgraduate program ===
The postgraduate program at the Faculty of Science, Kasetsart University is designed for students who are interested in pursuing master's or doctoral degrees and aspire to become scholars capable of conducting high-quality scientific research in various fields including Biological Sciences, Physical Sciences, and Data Sciences.

Furthermore, the Faculty of Science, Kasetsart University has established extensive collaboration and exchange programs with international institutions such as Yale University (USA), University of California (USA), University of Bristol (UK), University of Bath (UK), Kyoto University (Japan), Waseda University (Japan), Chimie ParisTech, PSL University (France), Stockholm University (Sweden), and others.

== Affiliated Research Centers ==
The Faculty of Science at Kasetsart University is actively engaged in research across various disciplines and is widely recognized as a leading institution in Thailand for research in Chemistry, Biological Sciences, and Computer Science & Information Systems. The faculty houses several research facilities dedicated to specific areas, including:

- Special Research Unit in Number Theory, Classical Analysis and Applications
- Laboratory for Computational and Applied Chemistry, LCAC
- Analytical Method Development in Trace Analysis
- Cheminformatics Research Unit
- Natural Products and Organic Synthesis, NPOS
- Innovative Research on Drug Discovery and Molecular Design
- Special Research Unit for Protein Engineering and Protein Bioinformatics, UPEB
- Animal Systematics and Ecology Speciality Research Unit, ASESRU
- Biopesticides Toxicology Speciality Research Unit, BTSRU
- Radioecology Research Unit
- Microalgal Molecular Genetics and Functional Genomics Special Research Unit, MMGFG-SRU
- Special Research Unit in Advanced Magnetic Resonance
- Biochemical Research Unit for Utilization Assessment, BCUFUA
- Applied Geo-Exploration Research Unit, Geo-X
- The Gem and Mineral Sciences Special Research Unit
- Environmental Geotechnology and Natural Disasters Special Research Unit
- Soil and Water Laboratory
- Evolutionary Genetics and Computational Biology Research Unit, EGCB

== Organisation and administration ==
=== Deans ===
The Deans who lead the Faculty of Science at Kasetsart University include:

Deans of the Faculty of Science, Kasetsart University
Name (English)	Name (Thai)	Years	References
1. Prof. Davi Yansukol, Ph.D.	ศาสตราจารย์ ดร.ทวี ญาณสุคนธ์	1966 - 1978	
2. Prof. Krisna Chutima, Ph.D.	ศาสตราจารย์ ดร.กฤษณา ชุติมา	1978 - 1980	
3. Asst. Prof. Sukpracha Vajanon, Ph.D.	ผู้ช่วยศาสตราจารย์ ดร.สุขประชา วาจานนท์	1980 - 1990	
4. Prof. Sumin Samutkupt, Ph.D.	ศาสตราจารย์ ดร.สุมินทร์ สมุทคุปต์	1990 - 1994	
5. Assoc. Prof. Vinij Jiamsakul, Ph.D.	รองศาสตราจารย์ ดร.วินิจ เจียมสกุล	1994 - 2006	
6. Dr. Surapol Patharakorn, Ph.D.	อาจารย์ ดร.สุรพล ภัทราคร	2006 - 2014	
7. Prof. Supa Hannongbua, Ph.D.	ศาสตราจารย์ ดร.สุภา หารหนองบัว	2014 - 2017	
8. Assoc. Prof. Apisit Songsasen, Ph.D.	รองศาสตราจารย์ ดร.อภิสิฏฐ์ ศงสะเสน	2017–present	

== Rankings and reputation ==
According to the QS World University Rankings by Subject, the Faculty of Science at Kasetsart University is ranked among the top 500 in the world for several disciplines:

Life Sciences & Medicine:

- Biological Sciences: Ranked 451-500 (2021)

Natural Sciences:

- Chemistry: Ranked 451-500 (2021)

Engineering & Technology:

- Computer Science & Information Systems: Ranked 451-500 (2021)

QS World University Rankings by Subject
Life Sciences & Medicine
Biological Sciences
Years	2021	2020	2019	2018	2017	2016	2015
Ranks	451-500	451-500	-	401-450	401-450	-	301-400
Natural Sciences
Chemistry
Years	2021	2020	2019	2018	2017	2016	2015
Ranks	451-500	401-450	401-450	451-500	451-500	-	-
Engineering & Technology
Computer Science & Information Systems
Years	2021	2020	2019	2018	2017	2016	2015
Ranks	-	-	-	-	-	401-450	-

University rankings

Global – Life sciences and medicine
- THE Life Sciences: 601-800 (2021)

Global – Science and engineering
- THE Computer Science: 601-800 (2021)
- THE Physical Sciences: 1001+ (2021)

In the 2020 U.S. News & World Report Ranking, Kasetsart University was ranked 747th in the field of Chemistry.

In the 2021 Times Higher Education World University Rankings, Kasetsart University was ranked 601-800th in Life Sciences, 601-800th in Computer Science, and 1001+ in Physical Sciences.

== Discoveries ==
=== Natural Sciences ===
- Viola umphangensis S. Nansai, Srisanga & Suwanph.: a newly discovered species from Thailand.
- Cnemaspis lineatubercularis Ampai, Wood, Stuart & Aowphol: a newly identified species from Thailand.
- Pseudorhabdosynochus kasetsartensis Saengpheng & Purivirojkul: a recently described species from Thailand.
- Stylogomphus thongphaphumensis Chainthong, Sartori & Boonsoong: a newly recognized species from Thailand.
- Thunbergia impatienoides Suwanph. & S. Vajrodaya: a recently identified species from Thailand.
- Coelogyne phuhinrongklaensis Ngerns. & P. Tippayasri (Orchidaceae): a newly documented species from Thailand.
- Piper viridescens sp. nov. (Piperaceae): a recently discovered species from Thailand.
- Peperomia (Piperaceae), namely P. heptaphylla, P. masuthoniana, P. multisurcula, and P. sirindhorniana: four newly described species from Thailand.
- Sangpradubina: a newly classified genus from Thailand.
- Compsoneuriella braaschi Boonsoong & Sartori, 2015: a newly identified species from Thailand.
- Gilliesia ratchaburiensis Boonsoong & Sartori, 2015: a recently described species from Thailand.
- Cymbalcloeon sartorii Suttinun, Gattolliat & Boonsoong, 2020: a newly discovered species from Thailand.
- Placobdelloides sirikanchanae sp. nov., a newly found species of glossiphoniid leech and a parasite of turtles from lower southern Thailand (Hirudinea, Rhynchobdellida)
- Batracobdelloides bangkhenensis sp. n. (Hirudinea: Rhynchobdellida), a new leech species parasitic on freshwater snails from Thailand
- Procerobaetis totuspinosus sp. nov., a newly described species from Thailand
- Placobdelloides tridens sp. n., a newly identified species of glossiphoniid leech (Hirudinea: Rhynchobdellida) from Thailand

== Notable alumni ==
Throughout its history, a significant number of KU Science alumni have achieved notable success in various fields, including academia and beyond. Prominent alumni who have made significant contributions include Princess Chulabhorn, a Thai princess who received the UNESCO Albert Einstein medal in 1986 for her efforts in promoting scientific collaboration (KU35); Lieutenant General Poonpirom Liptapanlop, former Minister of Energy of Thailand (KU33); Ms. Jirawan Boonperm, former Permanent Secretary of the Ministry of Information and Communication Technology of Thailand (KU30); Mr. Somchai Tiamboonprasert, former Deputy Permanent Secretary of the Ministry of Science and Technology of Thailand; Ms. Pannee Sriyuthasak, former Deputy Permanent Secretary of the Ministry of Labour of Thailand and former Director General of the Department of Skill Development of Thailand (KU33); and Ms. Kongkanda Chayamarit, a Thai botanist and former Director General of The Botanical Garden Organization, Thailand (KU31).

Notable alumni

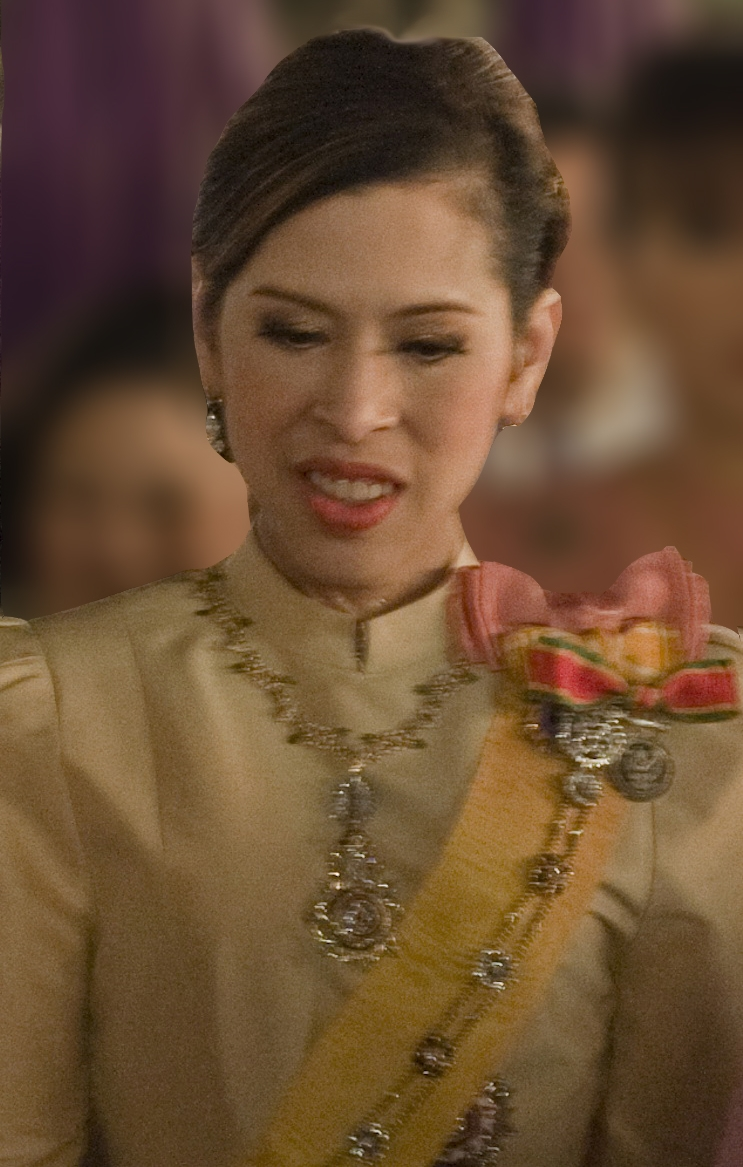
Princess Chulabhorn

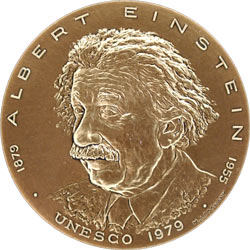
UNESCO Albert Einstein medal
