= Xujati Kambhu =

Thai irrigation engineer

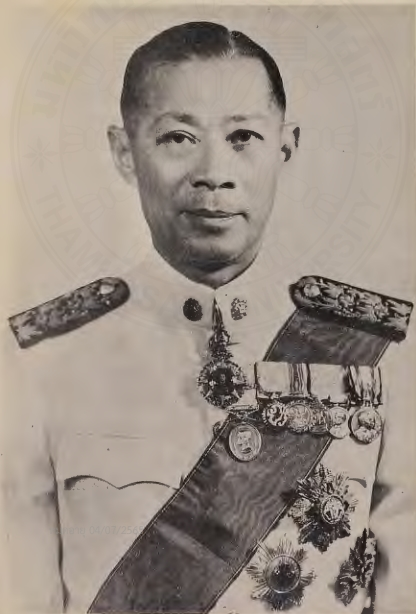
Xujati Kambhu

Mom Luang Xujati Kambhu (RTGS: Chuchat Kamphu, Thai: หม่อมหลวงชูชาติ กำภู; 4 January 1905 – 13 April 1969) was a Thai irrigation engineer who pioneered modern irrigation construction in the country. He served as Director-General of the Royal Irrigation Department, and oversaw the construction of Bhumibol Dam, the country's first (and only) concrete arch dam, completed in 1964. He also served as Deputy Minister of National Development and President of Kasetsart University.
