= Ao Noi =

Coordinates: 11.916565°N 99.754076°E

Ao Noi ตำบลอ่าวน้อย
- Subdistrict
- Interactive map of Ao Noi
- Country: Thailand
- Province: Prachuap Khiri Khan
- District: Prachuap Khiri Khan

Government
  - Type: Subdistrict Administrative Organization (SAO)

Population (2025)
  - Total: 19,281
- Time zone: UTC+7 (ICT)

Ao Noi (Thai: ตำบลอ่าวน้อย, pronounced [ʔàːw nɔ́j]) is a tambon (subdistrict) of Mueang Prachuap Khiri Khan District, in Prachuap Khiri Khan province, Thailand. In 2025, it had a population of 19,281 people.

== History ==
Ao Noi was considered as a tambon on March 2, 1995

== Administration ==
=== Central administration ===
The tambon is divided into seven administrative villages (mubans).

No.	Name	Thai	Population
1.	Nong Ya Plong	หนองหญ้าปล้อง	696
2.	Ao Noi	อ่าวน้อย	1,126
3.	Khan Kradai	คั่นกระได	1,588
4.	Ban Bueng	บ้านบึง	1,499
5.	Nongsua	หนองเสือ	941
6.	Ket-en	เกตุเอน	1,746
7.	Komoh Five	กม. 5	2,845
8.	Vangsai Ting	วังไทรติ่ง	1,118
9.	Komoh Twelve	กม. 12	1,935
10.	Vang Madua	วังมะเดื่อ	1,430
11.	Nong Yai-em	หนองยายเอม	798
12.	Yansu	ย่านซื่อ	1,062
13.	Thung Mamao	ทุ่งมะเม่า	207
14.	Thung Yao	ทุ่งยาว	369
15.	Raiyup	ไร่ยุบ	460
16.	Bung Yai	บึงใหญ่	1,803
