= Ratthasart Korrasud =

Ratthasart Korrasud รัฐศาสตร์ กรสูต
- Also known as: Pepper UHT
- Born: Ratthasart Korrasud; January 1, 1976 (age 50); Bangkok, Thailand
- Genre: Thai pop
- Occupations: Digital Executive & Academic Scholar, IT; singer; actor; model; YouTuber
- Years active: 1994–present
- Label: GMM Grammy

Ratthasart Korrasud (Thai: รัฐศาสตร์ กรสูต born January 1, 1976) is recognized from both IT Management for various companies and formal Thai pop singer and actor GMM Grammy who released his debut in 1994 with the boyband U.H.T. (ยูเอชที). He is also sometimes known as Pepper UHT. Currently active as an IT/ digital media expert, he has worked in this field for many years and teaches IT for many universities. Currently, he is head of eCommerce Development of Electronic Transactions Development Agency, Ministry of Information and Communication Technology (ICT), Royal Thai Government. Previously he was Vice President of Sanook Online (now Tencent (Thailand)), the operator of Thailand's number one web portal and Country Manager of LINE Corporation (Thailand.)

== Biography ==
Pepper was born in Bangkok in 1976. He is of Thai, Chinese, and German descent. In 1994, he debuted his career as a member of the inaugural famous Thai boyband U.H.T. (ยูเอชที). He received his bachelor's degree in Public Administration from the Faculty of Political Science, Thammasat University. From 2000 to 2002, he studied in Chicago, Illinois in the United States for a Master of Information System – Software Engineering where he graduated with honors. Soon after, he returned to his home country to complete a doctoral degree in Branch Board of Education Curriculum and Instruction (C&I) from Kasetsart University in 2011.

== Discography ==
=== Work Experiences ===
- 2018 SENIOR EXECUTIVE VICE PRESIDENT/ COO, DIGITAL ECONOMY PROMOTION AGENCY (DEPA), MDES
- 2015 SENIOR DIRECTOR, ELECTRONIC TRANSACTIONS DEVELOPMENT AGENCY (ETDA), MDES
- 2014 Country Manager/ CEO – LINE Corporation (Thailand)
- 2011 Vice President – Sanook Online Co.Ltd. (Tencent Technology)
- 2001 Consultant – Holcim Services (ASIA) Co., Ltd.

=== Albums with U.H.T. ===
- 1994 – Good good friends / ดูดีดีนะเพื่อน
- 1996 – Summertimes / ซัมเมอร์ ไทม์
- 2003 – 2U / ทูยู
- 2004 – Red Message / เรด เมสเสจ

=== Special Albums ===
Group albums with U.H.T., Tata Young, Christina Aguilar, Patiparn Pataweekarn, Myria Benedetti and Jetrin Wattanasin

- 1995 – 6.2.12
- 2013 – 6.2.13

== Filmography ==
=== Television ===
- 1995–96 – Hok Tok Mai Taek / หกตกไม่แตก with U.H.T. members
- 2004 – Leh Ratree / เล่ห์รตี with Ann Alicia Laisuthruklai
- 2004 – Wung Num Won / วังน้ำวน with Ann Alicia Laisuthruklai
- 2005 – Buang Ruk / บ่วงรัก with Fang Pitchaya
- 2005 – Rak Lhok Lhok Yah Boke Krai / รักหลอกๆ อย่าบอกใคร with Sopitnapa Chumpanee
- 2006 – Lord Lai Mungkorn / ลอดลายมังกร with Pimolrat Pisolyabutr
- 2007 – Maya Pissaward / มายาพิศวาส with Ann Alicha Laisattruklai
- 2007 – Sao Ban Rai Grub Nai Hi-So / สาวบ้านไร่กับนายไฮโซ with Ann Alicha Laisattruklai
- 2008 – Sapai Khon Krua / สะใภ้ก้นครัว with Amy Amika Klinprathum
- 2009 – Ching Chang / ชิงชัง with Ann Alicha Laisattruklai
- 2010 – Rong Raem Pee / โรงแรมผี with Chakrit Yamnam
- 2010 – Sao Chai Hi-Tech / สาวใช้ไฮเทค with Amy Amika Klinprathum
- 2011 – Talad Arom / ตลาดอารมณ์ with Airin Yoogthatat

=== Master of Ceremony: MC ON TV ===
Year	Thai title	Title	Network	Notes	With
2020	CAPP		YouTube:CAPP Official		Supakorn Lopipat
