= Navin Yavapolkul =

Thai singer, actor and lecturer

Navin Yavapolkul นาวิน เยาวพลกุล
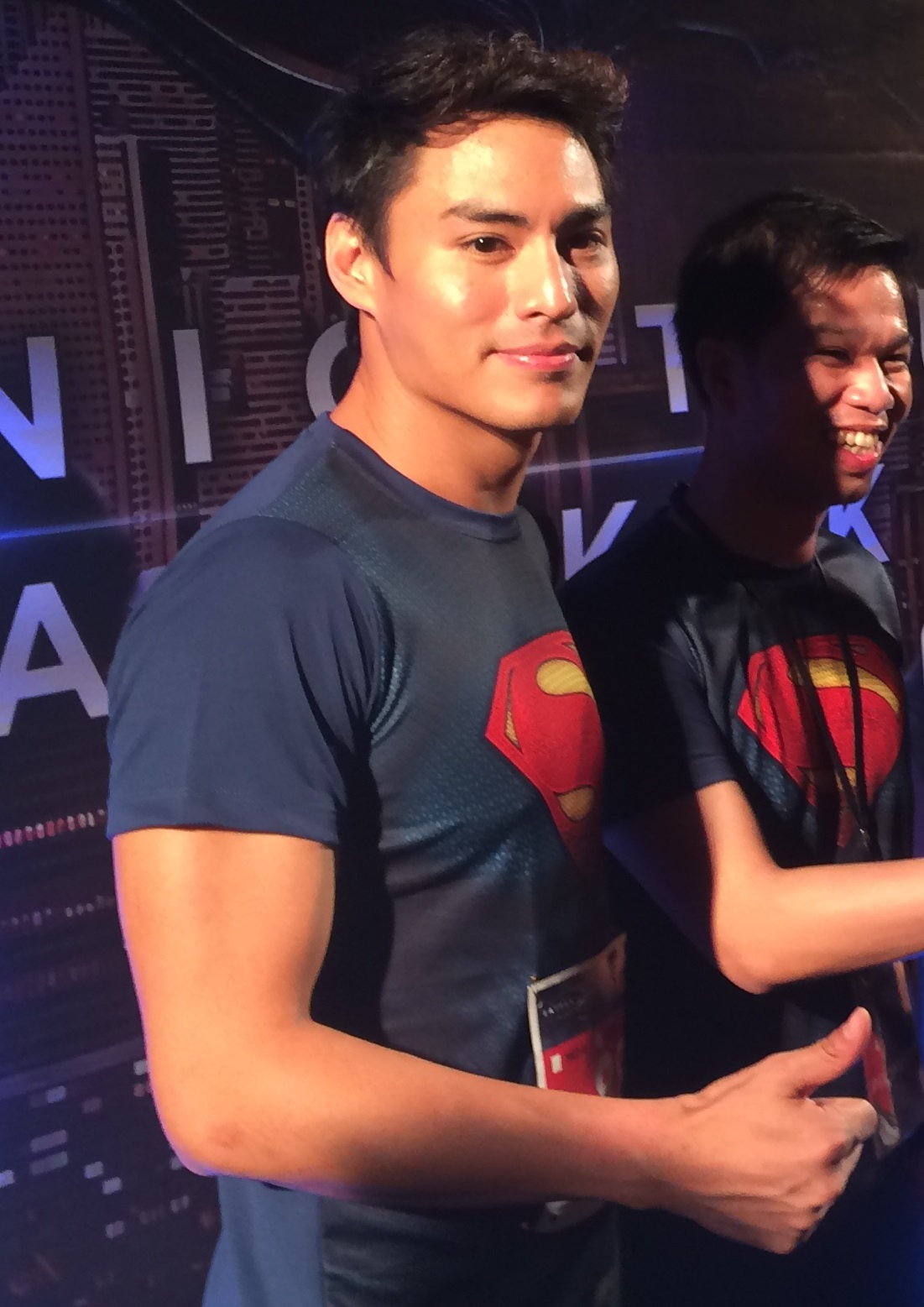

Background information
- Also known as: Navin Tar
- Born: February 8, 1979 (age 46); Bangkok, Thailand
- Origin: Bangkok
- Occupations: Singer; presenter; model; actor; lecturer
- Years active: 1997–2001; 2009–present
- Website: Official website
- Height: 1.80 m (5 ft 11 in)

Navin Yavapolkul (Thai: นาวิน เยาวพลกุล; born February 8, 1979), known professionally as Navin Tar, is a Thai singer, actor and lecturer of Kasetsart University.

== Biography ==
Navin Yavapolkul was born February 8, 1979, in Bangkok, Thailand. He graduated from Kasetsart University (First class honors) with a Bachelor of Economics. He also attended Oregon State University where he earned his master's degree. Yavapolkul received his PhD from the University of California, Davis. He is a professor at Kasetsart University, where he teaches Mathematics for Economists and Microeconomics.

Yavapolkul has participated in several triathlons.

He married with Passawee Payakbud on March 25, 2017 He has daughter name Pinnava Yavapolkul nickname Luca.

== Academic works ==
- Post–Uruguay Round price linkages between developed and developing countries: the case of rice and wheat markets.

== Discography ==
=== Sololist Albums ===
- Navin Tar (1997)
- Muan Dem Team Namkheng (1998)
- Variety (1998)
- Chuanchim (2000)

== Filmography ==
Year	Movie/Serie	Character
2006	The Innocent Killer	Kim
2009	Bang-en Rakmaisinsud	Khajon
2015	Single Lady	Ken
2015	LoveH2O	Jo
2016	Arikato	

== Commercials ==
- Oralmate (1999)
- Brand (2000)
- Klear Shampoo (2013)
- Userreen(2014)
- Suzuki Ciaz(2015)
- Minere (2016)
- Sunplay (2016)

== Awards And Achievement ==
Date	Award	TiTle	Note
September 20, 2000	Youth Excellent	Education and academic	
