= Anchana Heemmina =

Thai human rights activist

Anchana Heemmina (Thai: อัญชนา หีมมิหน๊ะ) is a Thai human rights activist.

== Biography ==
Heemmina has a bachelor's degree in forestry from Kasetsart University and an MA in business administration from Prince of Songkla University.

In 2008, her brother-in-law was arrested and imprisoned for two years on charges of killing state security forces, but was ultimately acquitted by the court in 2010. In 2011, she founded Through Duay Jai, a human rights NGO focused on exposing torture by the Thai government in the South Thailand insurgency.

In January 2016, Through Duay Jai published a report documenting at least 54 cases of torture in the south following the 2014 Thai coup d'état. Following the report, she was subjected to a campaign of harassment by a group of unidentified men in green uniforms claiming to be border police, who showed up to the clothing shop she managed and to her house, where they searched for her and interrogated her mother for several hours. In May 2016, the Thai Internal Security Operations Command filed an official complaint about her, accusing them of defamation. In July, she was ordered to report to police for criminal investigation over the charges. The investigation attracted international attention, with Amnesty International calling it part of "a longstanding pattern of attempts to intimidate human rights defenders" and Human Rights Watch stating that it was "government intimidation, censorship, and retaliation against human rights defenders in southern Thailand." In 2017, the charges against her were finally dropped.

In 2019, she was the target of an online abuse campaign on social media. In 2020, Facebook banned several of the accounts that had been abusing her and the opposition Future Forward Party published documents revealing that those accounts had been directed by the Thai military.

In July 2020, she called for the Thai military to stop collecting DNA samples during the conscription process, arguing that it was an attempt to create a mass surveillance database of people in the south.
