= Sunanta Kangvalkulkij =

Thai diplomat

- สุนันทา กังวาลกุลกิจ
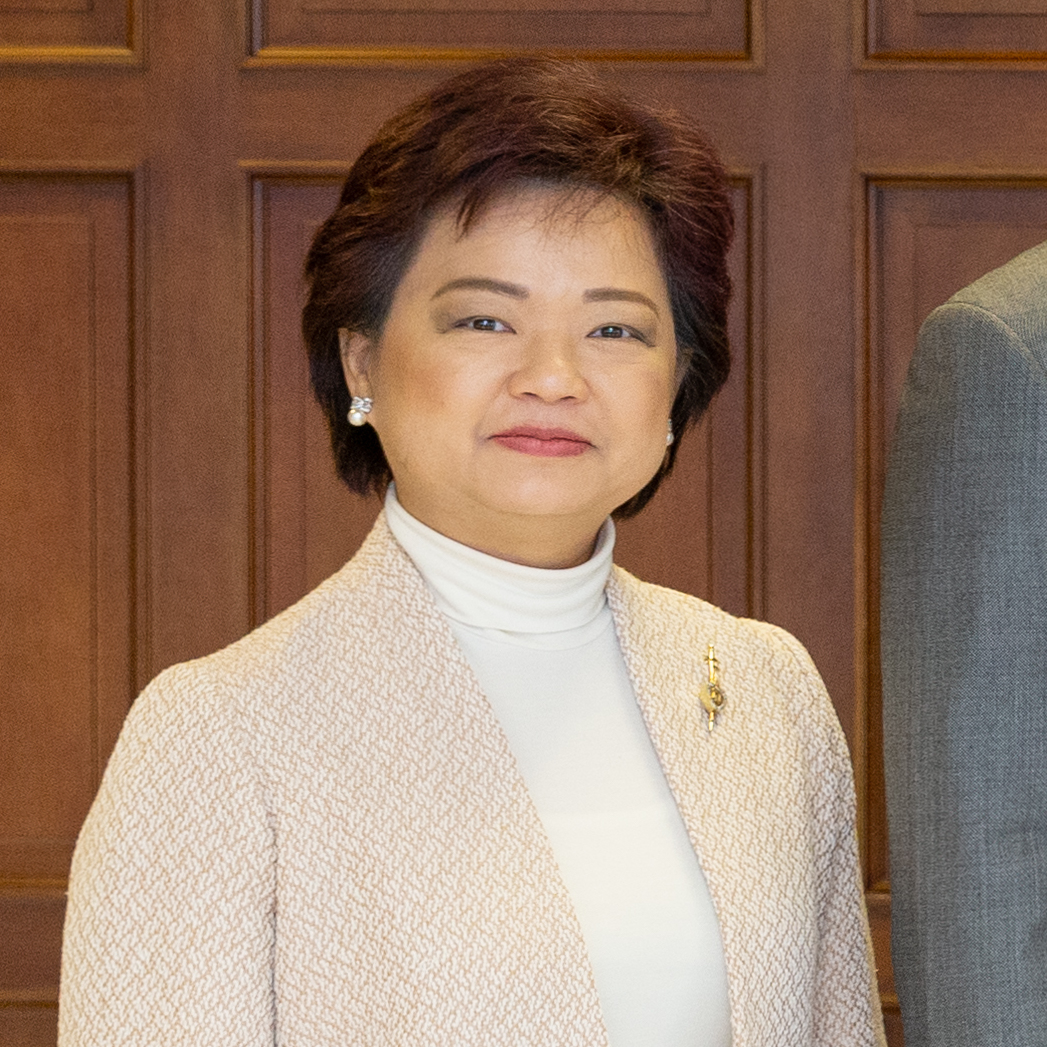
- Occupation: Ambassador
- Known for: Ambassador of Thailand to the WTO and WIPO

Sunanta Kangvalkulkij (Thai: สุนันทา กังวาลกุลกิจ, RTGS: Sunantha Kangwankunkit) is a Thai diplomat. She is the Ambassador and Permanent Representative of Thailand to the World Trade Organization and the World Intellectual Property Organization.

== Life ==
Kangvalkulkij was given a Royal Thai scholarship and she was able to study for a master's degree in economics from the University of Illinois. She served twenty years in her country's Ministry of Commerce, rising to Deputy Director General of trade negotiations. She became Thailand's permanent representative to the WTO and WIPO.

She was elected chair of the General Council of the World Trade Organization for 2020. following a year leading the WTO's Dispute Resolution committee. The General Council is the highest body of the WTO and it meets regularly in Geneva. She is the first Thai to have this role and her appointment in 2019 was seen as challenging against the background of an increasing trade war between the USA and China.

In March 2020 David Walker, who is New Zealand's WTO representative, was elected to chair the World Trade Organisation's General Council. He took over from Kangvalkulkij and will hold the post for a year.
