= Prachuap Khiri Khan railway station =

Railway station in Prachuap Khiri Khan, Thailand

Prachuap Khiri Khan ประจวบคีรีขันธ์
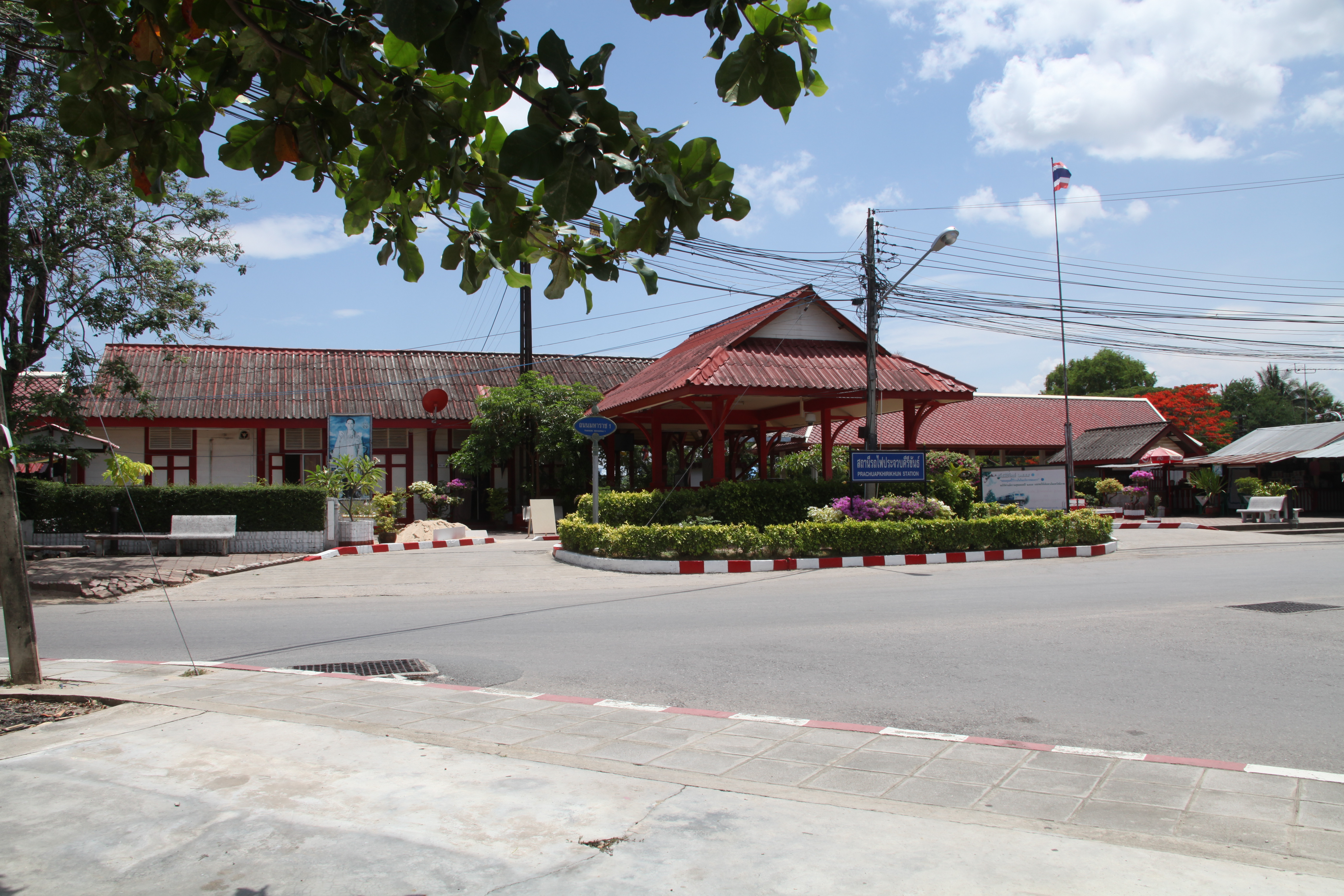
- Prachuap Khiri Khan Station

General information
- Location: Maharat Road, Prachuap Khiri Khan Subdistrict, Prachuap Khiri Khan City
- Owner: State Railway of Thailand
- Line: Southern Line
- Platforms: 3
- Tracks: 4

Other information
- Station code: จข.

History
- Opened: June 1914

Services
Preceding station	State Railway of Thailand	Following station
Khan Kradai towards Hua Lamphong or Krung Thep Aphiwat	Southern Line	Nong Hin towards Su-ngai Kolok
Location

Prachuap Khiri Khan railway station (Thai: สถานีประจวบคีรีขันธ์) is a railway station located in Prachuap Khiri Khan Subdistrict, Prachuap Khiri Khan City, Thailand. It is a class 1 railway station located 302.339 km (187.9 mi) from Thon Buri railway station and serves as the main station of Prachuap Khiri Khan Province.

The station opened on 1 June 1914, as the terminus of the Southern Line extension from Wang Phong. In December 1915, the line continued on to Ban Krut Station.

A new station was built to the north of the original station as part of the double-track section from Nakhon Pathom to Chumphon. It featured a new station building, elevated platforms and a footbridge.

== Train services ==
Every passenger trains stopped at Prachuap Khiri Khan (except for Express 83/84 from Krung Thep Aphiwat - Trang - Krung Thep Aphiwat)

- Thaksinarath Express 31/32 Krung Thep Aphiwat - Hat Yai Junction - Krung Thep Aphiwat
- Thaksin Express 37/38 Krung Thep Aphiwat - Su-ngai Kolok - Krung Thep Aphiwat
- Special Express 39/40 Krung Thep Aphiwat - Surat Thani - Krung Thep Aphiwat
- Special Express 43/44 Krung Thep Aphiwat - Surat Thani - Krung Thep Aphiwat
- International Express 45/46 Krung Thep Aphiwat - Su-ngai Kolok - Krung Thep Aphiwat
- Express 85/86 Krung Thep Aphiwat - Nakhon Si Thammarat - Krung Thep Aphiwat
- Rapid 167/168 Krung Thep Aphiwat - Kantang - Krung Thep Aphiwat
- Rapid 169/170 Krung Thep Aphiwat - Yala - Krung Thep Aphiwat
- Rapid 171/172 Krung Thep Aphiwat - Su-ngai Kolok - Krung Thep Aphiwat
- Rapid 173/174 Krung Thep Aphiwat - Nakhon Si Thammarat - Krung Thep Aphiwat
- Ordinary 251/252 Thon Buri - Prachuap Khiri Khan - Thon Buri
- Ordinary 254/255 Lang Suan - Thon Buri - Lang Suan
