= Mueang Prachuap Khiri Khan district =

Mueang Prachuap Khiri Khan เมืองประจวบคีรีขันธ์
- District
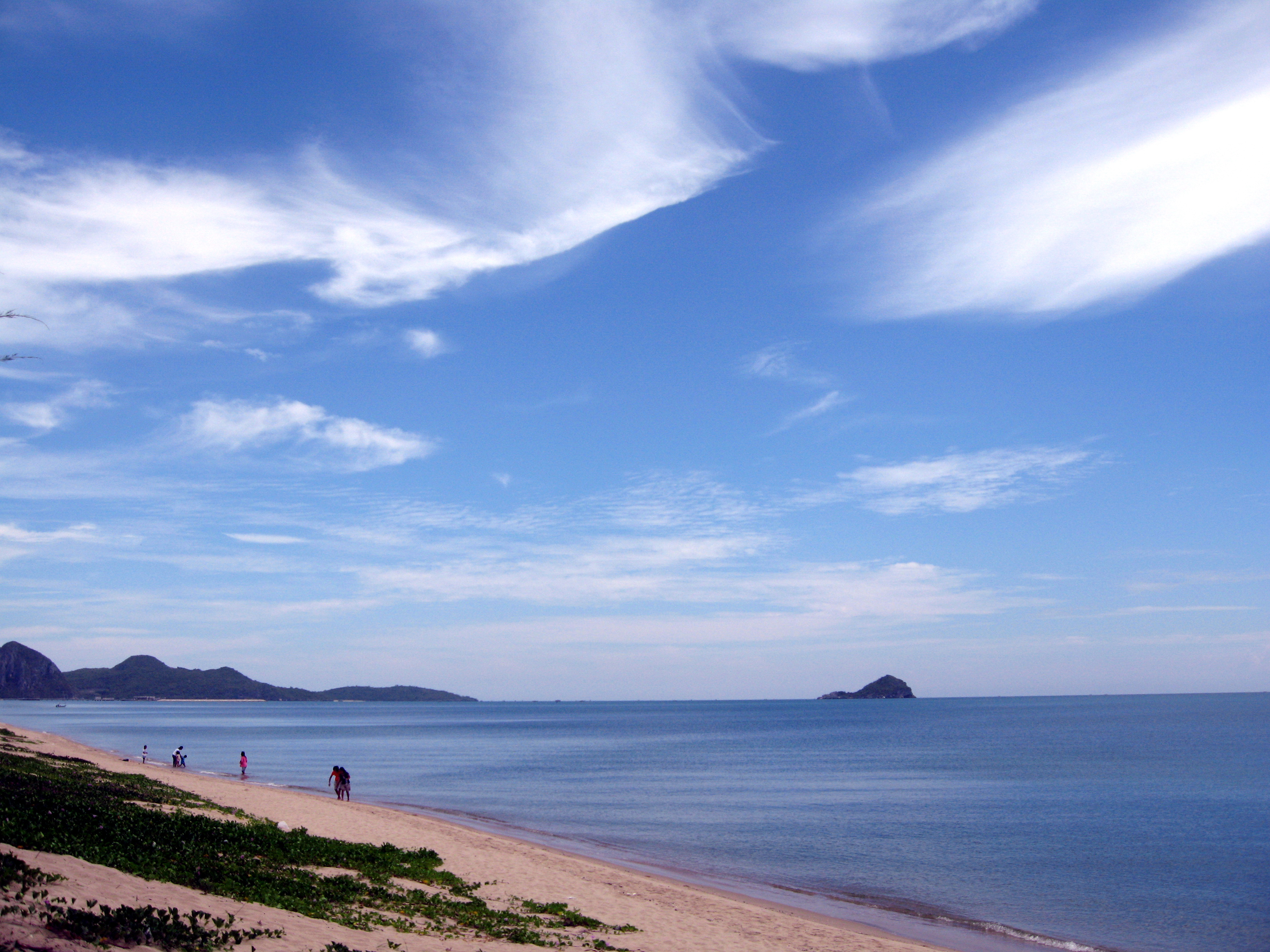
- Beach at tambon Khlong Wan

- District location in Prachuap Khiri Khan province
- Coordinates: 11°48′30″N 99°47′48″E
- Country: Thailand
- Province: Prachuap Khiri Khan

Area
  - Total: 830.0 km^{2} (320.5 sq mi)

Population (January 2025)
  - Total: 90,209
  - Density: 106.88/km^{2} (276.8/sq mi)
- Time zone: UTC+7 (ICT)
- Postal code: 77000
- Geocode: 7701

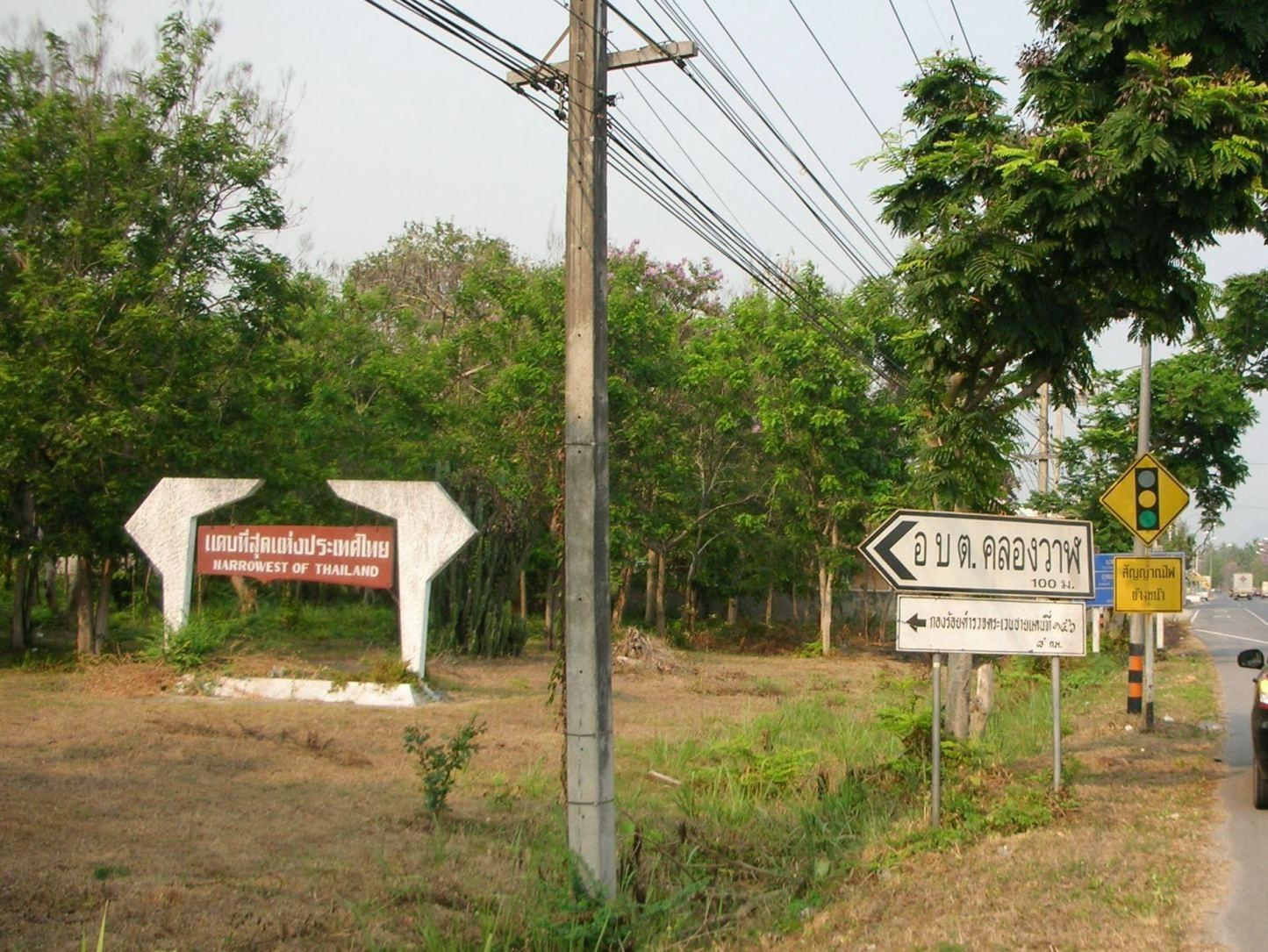
Monument marking the narrowest point in Thailand, Mueang Prachuap Khiri Khan district

Mueang Prachuap Khiri Khan (Thai: เมืองประจวบคีรีขันธ์, pronounced [mɯ̄aŋ prā.tɕùap kʰīː.rīː kʰǎn]) is the capital district (amphoe mueang) of Prachuap Khiri Khan province, central Thailand.

== History ==
During the Ayutthaya period (1351-1767), the district was the site of Na Rang town. In the early-Rattanakosin era, King Rama II established Mueang Bang Nang Rom at the mouth of the Nang Rom canal. But, as the land was not fertile, the king moved the city center to Mueang Kui. The new city name was kept. In the reign of Mongkut, King Rama IV, Bang Nang Rom, Kui, and Klong Wan towns were merged into Prachuap Khiri Khan, meaning 'town with clusters of mountains'. In 1894 King Chulalongkorn placed Mueang Prachuap under Mueang Phetchaburi. In 1899, the town hall was moved from Kui town to Ao Koh Lak, (Ao Prachuap). In 1906 the monarch merged Mueang Pranburi, Kamnoed Nopphakhun, and Prachuap, and established Mueang Pranburi to keep the name of Mueang Pran. The new city was made a province under the control of Monthon Ratchaburi. To prevent city name confusion, King Vajiravudh (Rama VI) changed the district name back to Prachuap Khiri Khan on 16 August 1915.

== Geography ==
The district is known as the "city of three bays", as on its eastern shores are the bays of Ao Noi, Ao Prachuap and Ao Manao.

Neighboring districts are Kui Buri to the north and Thap Sakae to the south. To the west is the Tanintharyi Region of Myanmar, to the east the Gulf of Thailand.

Thailand is at its narrowest in this district, with only 11 km between a point close to the border checkpoint of Dan Sing Khon (ด่านสิงขร) on the Myanmar border and the Gulf of Thailand.

== Administration ==
The district is divided into six sub-districts (tambons), which are further subdivided into 53 villages (mubans). The town (thesaban mueang) of Prachuap Khiri Khan covers the complete tambon Prachuap Khiri Khan as well as parts of Ko Lak and Ao Noi. Parts of tambon Khlong Wan belong to the township Khlong Wan.

No.	Name	Thai name	Villages
1.	Prachuap Khiri Khan	ประจวบคีรีขันธ์	-
2.	Ko Lak	เกาะหลัก	11
3.	Khlong Wan	คลองวาฬ	9
4.	Huai Sai	ห้วยทราย	13
5.	Ao Noi	อ่าวน้อย	16
6.	Bo Nok	บ่อนอก	14

== Folklore ==
The district has folklore about the origin of the names of various landscapes in the local area, as well as other places in the Gulf of Thailand, including islands, bays or mountains. "The Story of Ta Mong Lai", a story of Prachuap Khiri Khan fisherman named Ta Mong Lai who live in Ao Noi. Ta Mong Lai and his wife, Yai Rampung, have only one beautiful daughter named Yomdoei. One day, he and his wife quarrel about Yomdoei's marriage. When he agreed to allow Yomdoei to marry the son of lord of China, but Yai Rampung agreed to allow Yomdoei to marry the son of the Phetchaburi governor. Therefore, they quarrel violently and throwing things at each other. Until finally they all died and their bodies with various belongings became places such as Khao Ta Mong Lai, Hat Mae Rampung, Ko Nom Sao, Khao Lommuak, Khao Chao Lai, Ko Sak, Khao Takiap, Khao Chong Krachok etc.
