= Kaeng Krachan National Park =

National park in Thailand

Kaeng Krachan National Park อุทยานแห่งชาติแก่งกระจาน
- IUCN category II (national park)
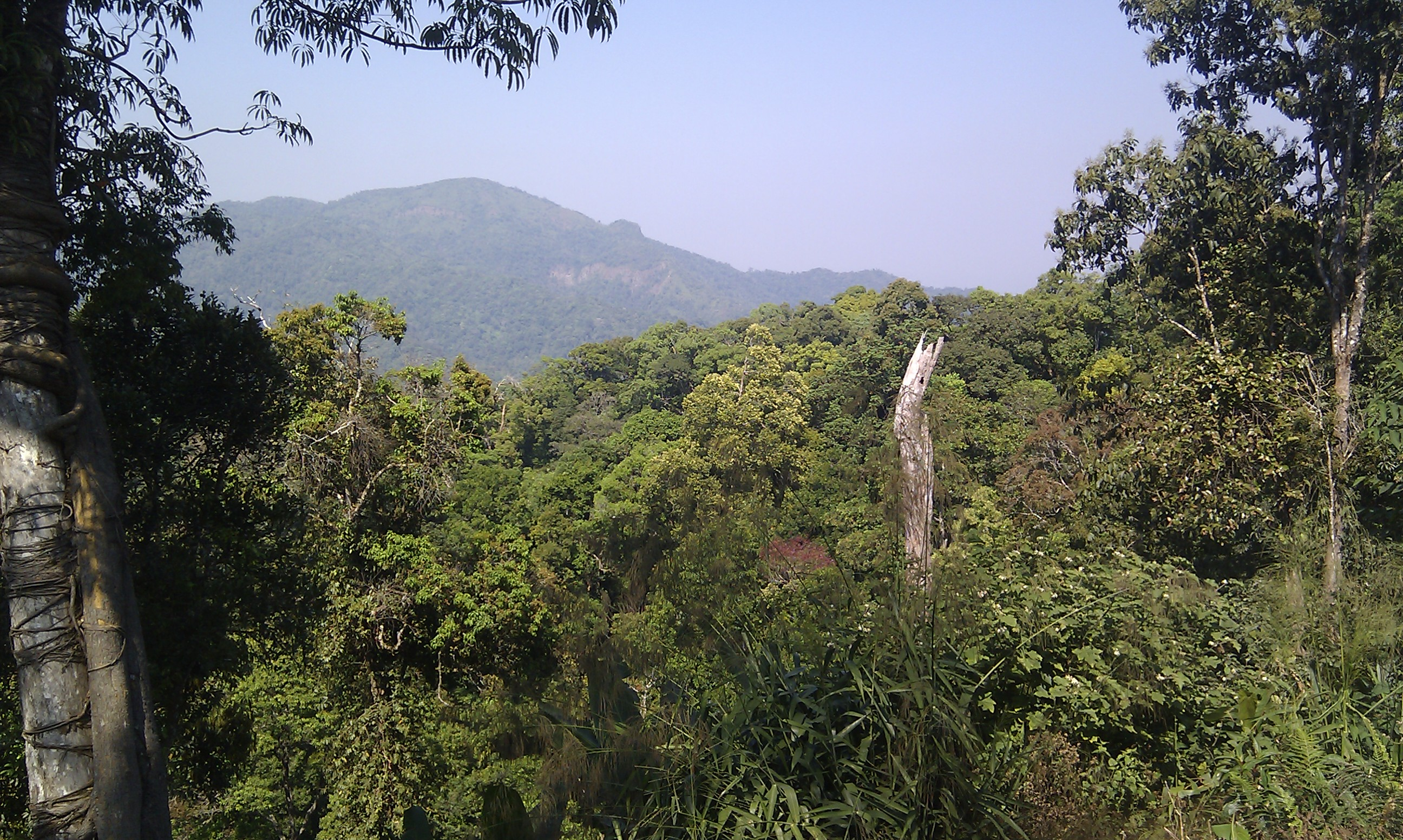

- Location within Thailand
- Location: Phetchaburi and Prachuap Khiri Khan Provinces, Thailand
- Nearest city: Phetchaburi
- Coordinates: 12°47′56″N 99°27′12″E
- Area: 2,915 km^{2} (1,125 sq mi)
- Established: 12 June 1981
- Visitors: 103,510 (in 2019)
- Governing body: Department of National Parks, Wildlife and Plant Conservation

UNESCO World Heritage Site
- Type: Natural
- Criteria: X
- Designated: 2021
- Part of: Kaeng Krachan Forest Complex
- Reference no.: 1461
- Region: Asia-Pacific

Kaeng Krachan National Park (Thai: อุทยานแห่งชาติแก่งกระจาน, RTGS: Utthayan Haeng Chat Kaeng Krachan, pronounced [ʔùt.tʰā.jāːn hɛ̀ŋ t͡ɕʰâːt kɛ̀ŋ krā.t͡ɕāːn]) is the largest national park of Thailand. It is on the border with Burma, contiguous with the Tanintharyi Nature Reserve. It is a popular park owing to its proximity to the tourist town of Hua Hin. It was named a UNESCO World Heritage Site on 26 July 2021, despite concerns from the OHCHR around the human rights violations of the indigenous people that live in the park.

== Geography ==
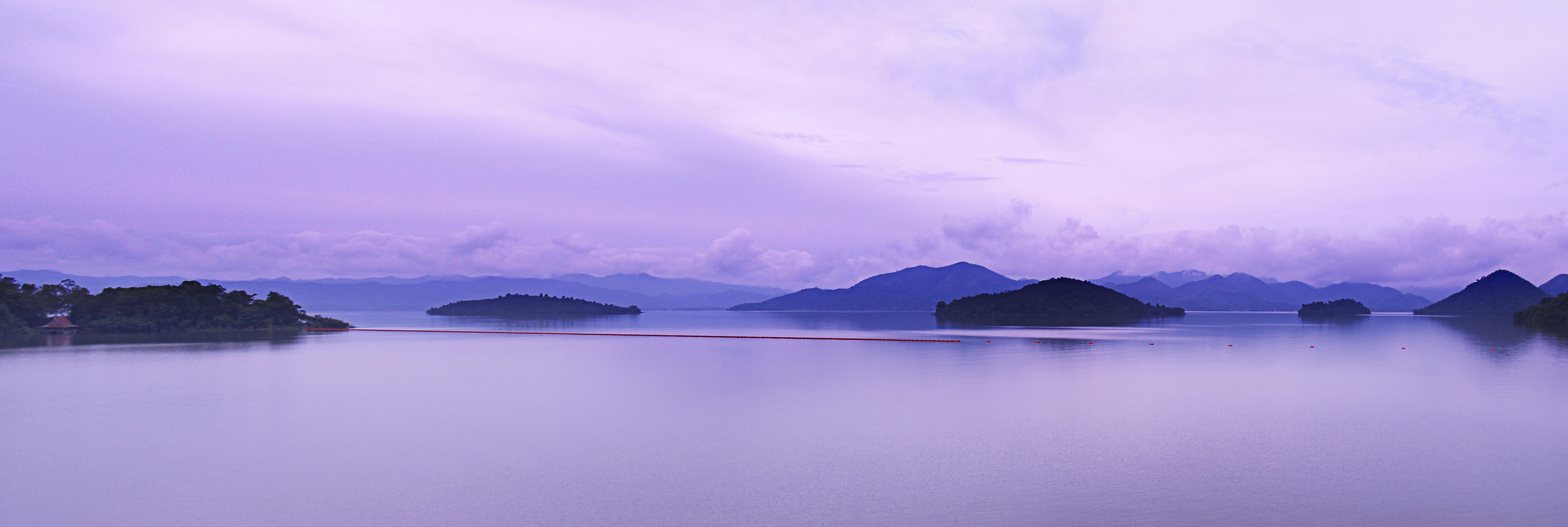
Kaeng Krachan Reservoir

The park covers parts of the districts Nong Ya Plong, Kaeng Krachan, and Tha Yang of Phetchaburi Province, and of Hua Hin of Prachuap Khiri Khan Province. It consists mainly of rain forest on the eastern slope of the Tenasserim Mountain Range. The highest elevation in the park is 1,513 meters, in a "joint area of Thailand and Myanmar". The second highest mountain peak is Kao Panern Toong with an elevation of 1,207 m. Two main rivers originate within the park area, the Pranburi River and the Phetchaburi River. The Phetchaburi is impounded by the Kaeng Krachan Dam at the eastern border of the park. The dam creates a lake covering an area of 46.5 km^{2}. The dam was built in 1966.

== History ==
The park was declared a reserve in 1964 and on 12 June 1981, it became the 28th national park of Thailand. Originally covering an area of 1,548,750 rai ~ 2,478 square kilometres (957 sq mi), it was enlarged in December 1984 to include the boundary area between Phetchaburi and Prachuap Khiri Khan Provinces, an additional 273,125 rai ~ 437 square kilometres (169 sq mi). The park has been included on the list of ASEAN Heritage Parks. It is part of the Kaeng Krachan Forest Complex, which the Thai government had repeatedly nominated for designation as a World Heritage Site since 2011. At its 2019 meeting, UNESCO's World Heritage Committee (WHC) rejected Thailand's third bid, citing outdated information regarding boundaries and a lack of local community participation. In July 2021 Thailand made its fourth application for World Heritage Site recognition. On 26 July 2021, the 21 nations of the UNESCO World Heritage Committee voted 12–9 to approve Kaeng Krachan's listing as a World Heritage Site.

The killing of wild elephants is an ongoing problem at the park, with authorities unable to control poachers. Some park officials are allegedly involved in the trade of elephant parts.

Despite national park status, there are private plantations within the confines of Kaeng Krachan National Park. Some of these are surrounded by electric fences which, in June 2013, fatally electrocuted an elephant calf.

In 2018, the park started taking bids on a project to pave 18.5 kilometres of the Bang Krang to Phanoen Thung Road. It is budgeted at 87.62 million baht. The existing one-lane dirt road is "broken beyond repair" according to the park's chief. Environmentalists oppose the project on the grounds that easier accessibility will mean more tourists in the fragile ecosystem. The park chief says, "...the project does not violate regulations...and [we have] a duty...to proceed with the project." The project was halted, at least temporarily, in early-November 2018 by the National Parks Department to allow opponents to be heard on the issue.

== Flora and fauna ==
The forests contain a great biodiversity of tropical vegetation, including tropical and subtropical broad leaf tree species and palms. Ninety-one species of mammals and 461 bird species have been counted in the park.

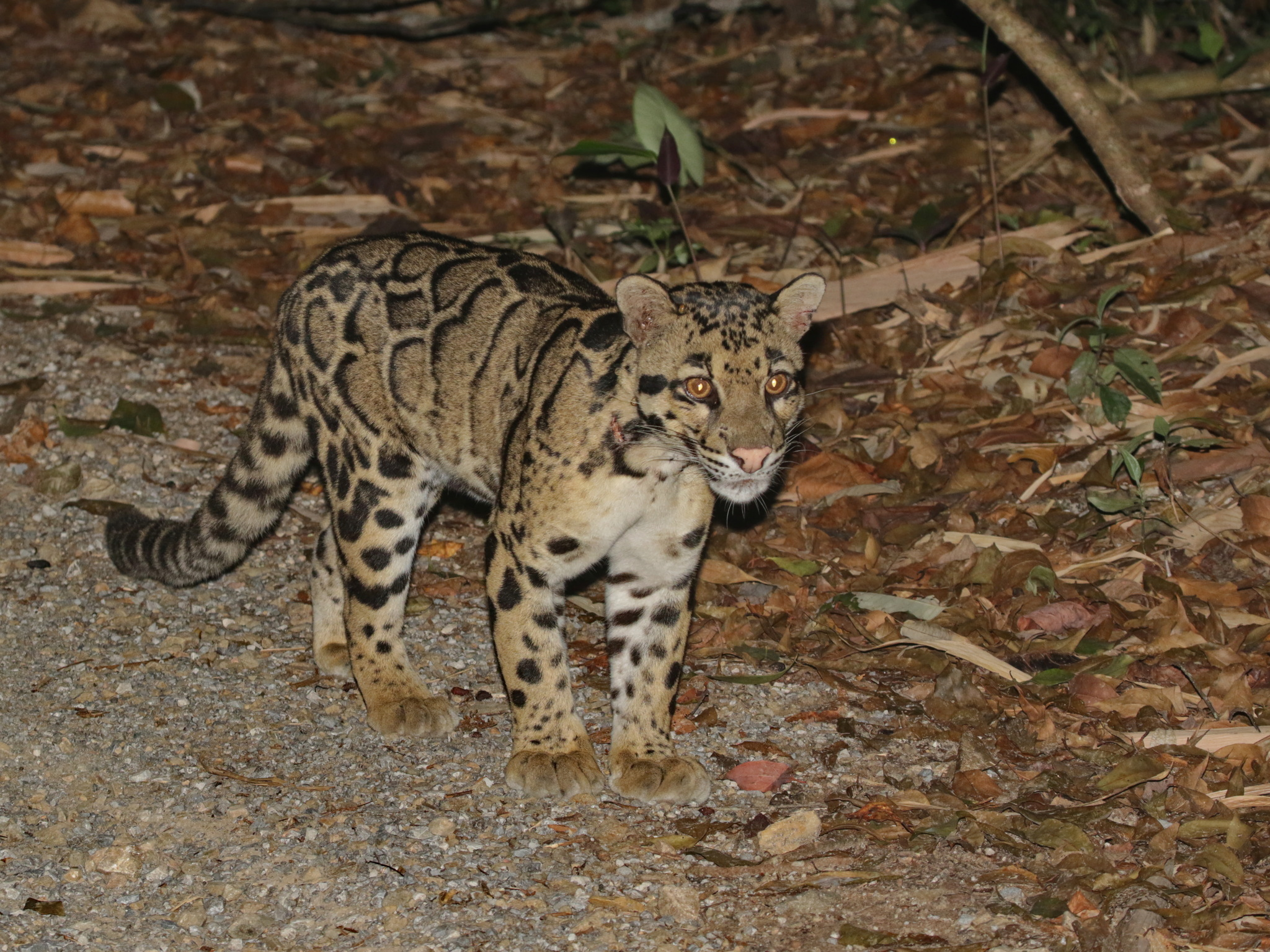
Neofelis nebulosa, Clouded leopard

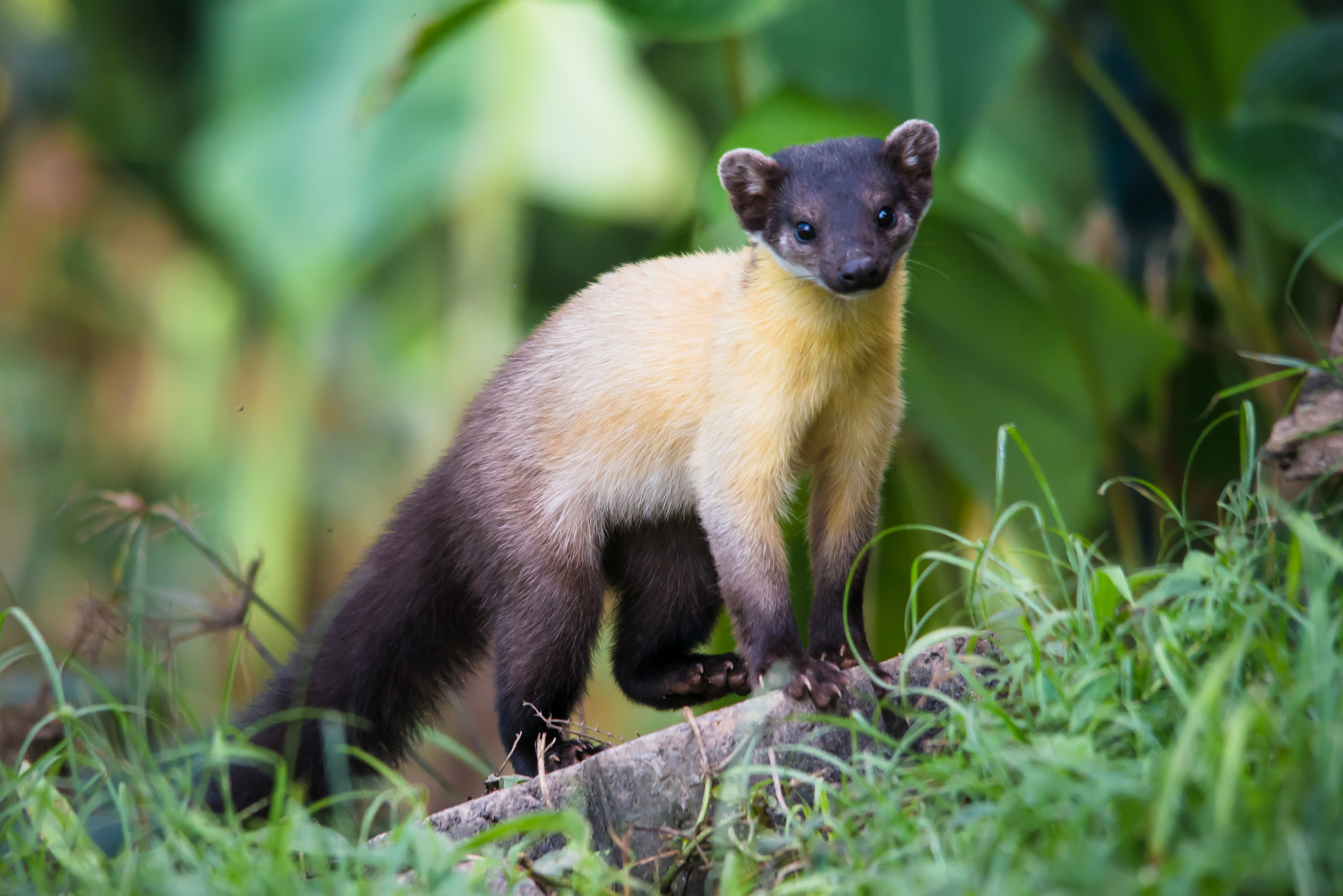
Martes flavigula, yellow-throated marten

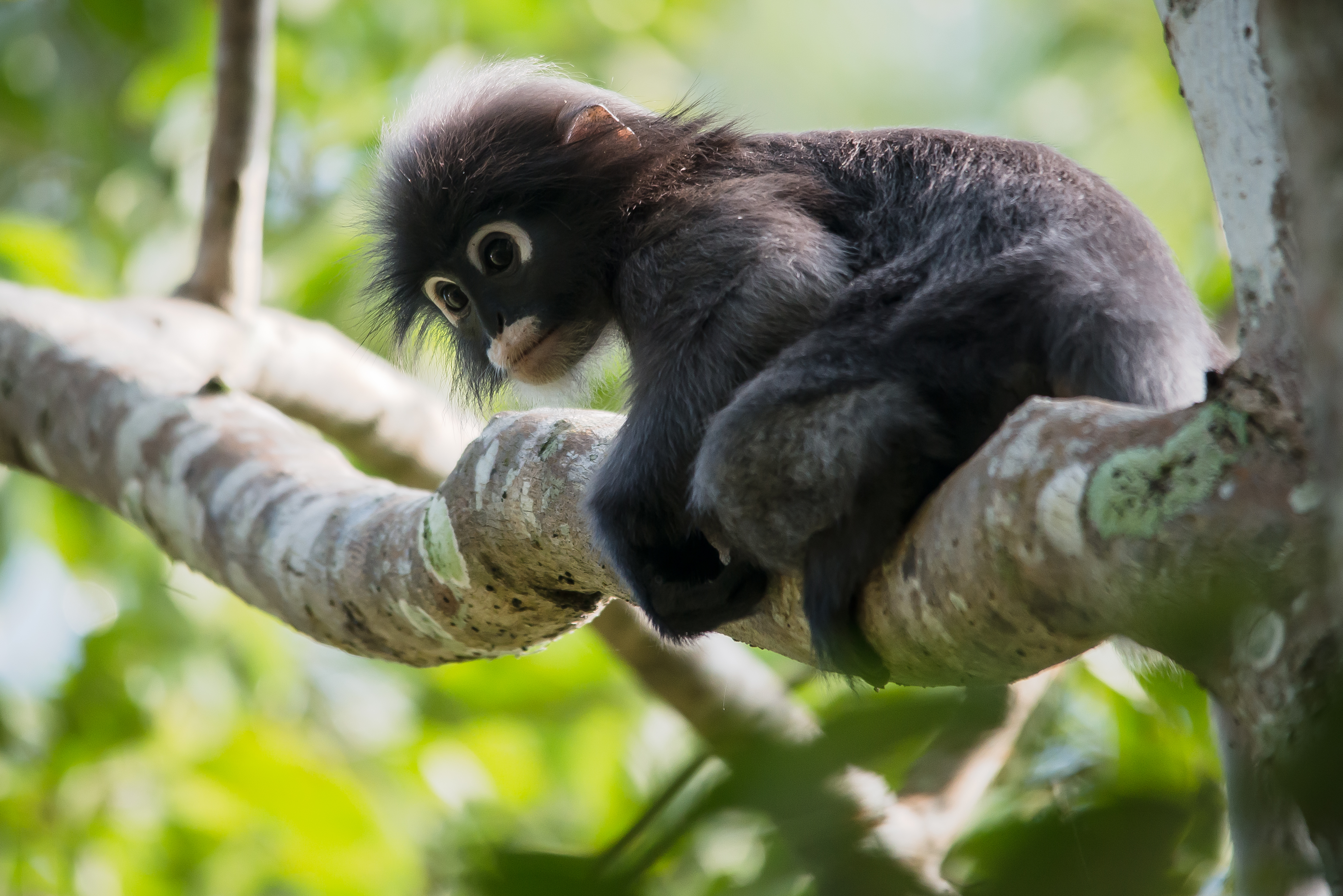
Trachypithecus obscurus, dusky leaf monkey

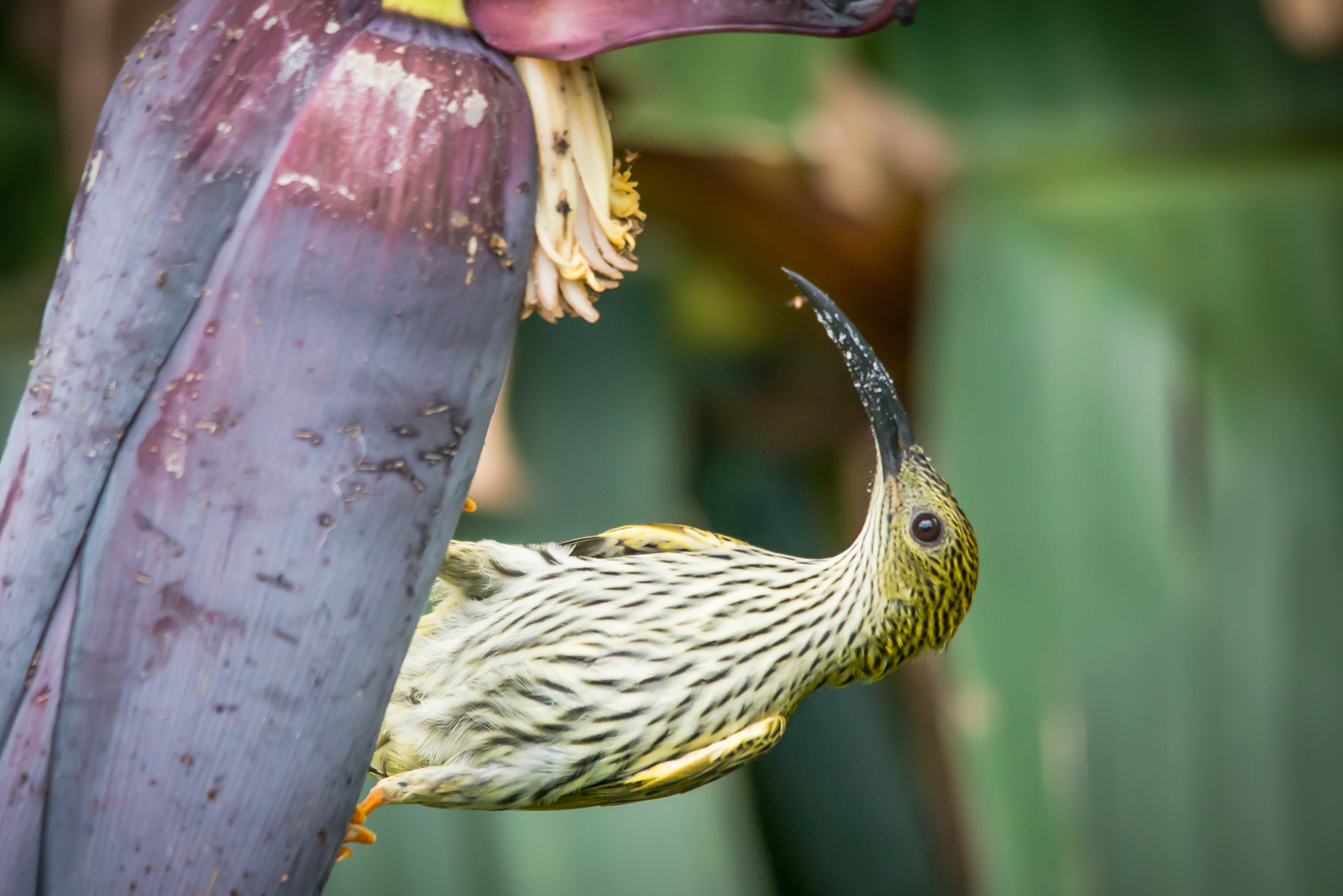
Arachnothera magna, streaked spiderhunter

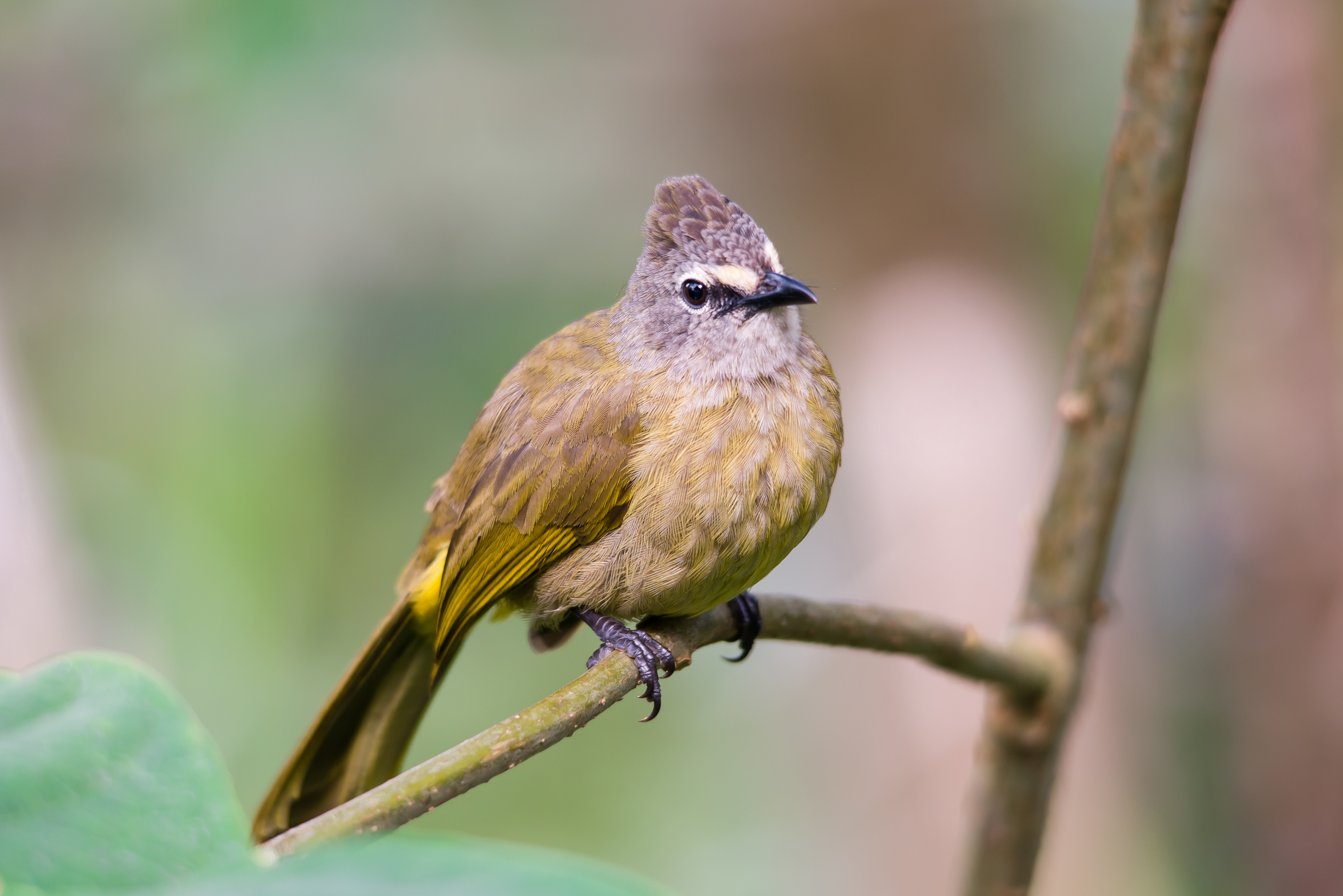
Pycnonotus flavescens, flavescent bulbul

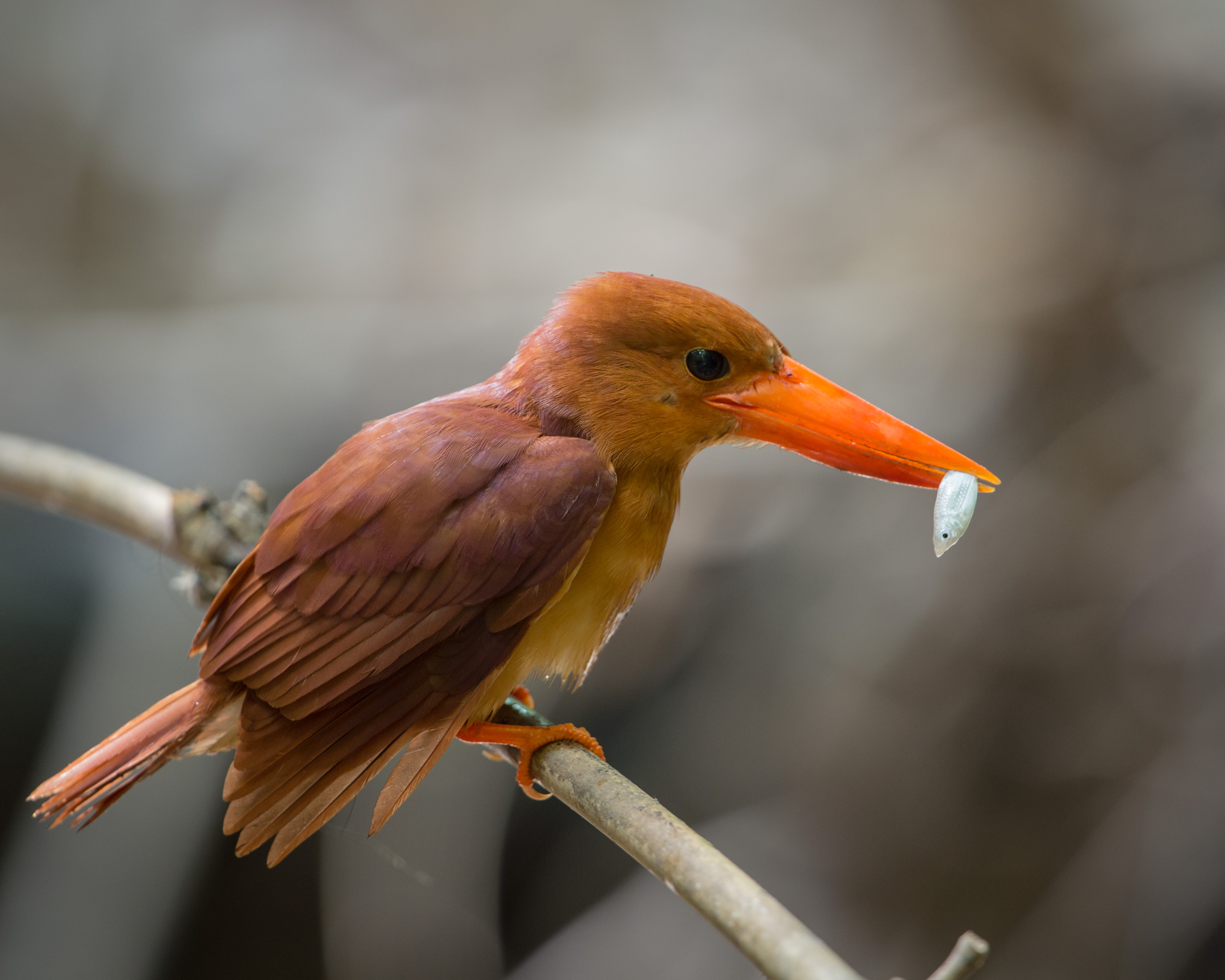
Halcyon coromanda, ruddy kingfisher

== Wild fruits ==
The following wild fruits are found in Kaeng Krachan National Park.

- Abutilon hirtum
- Actephila excetsa
- Actephita ovatis
- Adenanthera pavonina
- Afgekia filipes
- Aglaia edulis
- Aglaia lawii
- Aglaia odoratissima
- Aglaonema ovatum
- Alangium kurzii
- Aistonia rostrata
- Amalocalyx microlobus
- Ampelocissus martinii
- Antheroporum glaucum
- Antidesma ghaesembilla
- Aporosa villosa
- Archidendron jiringa
- Argyreia roseopurpurea
- Artabotrys burmanicus
- Artocarpus lacucha
- Aspidopterys tomentosa
- Balakata baccata
- Bauhinia ornata
- Beilschmiedia glauca
- Benkara sinensis
- Breynia retusa
- Bridelia insulana
- Buxus cochinchinensis
- Byttneria andamanensis
- Calamus longlsetus
- Capparis zeylanica
- Castanopsis armata
- Castanopsis echidnocarpa
- Catunaregam spathulifolia
- Catunaregam tomentosa
- Ceriscoides mamillata
- Cleistanthus hirsutulus
- Clerodendrum glandulosum
- Clerodendrum infortunatum
- Cnestis palala
- Colona auricutata
- Croton caudatus
- Cyclocodon lancifolius
- Dichapetalum longipetalum
- Dillenia indica
- Diospyros apiculata
- Diospyros glandulosa
- Diospyros rhodocalyx
- Diospyros rubra
- Dipterocarpus turbinatus
- Dissochaeta divaricata
- Dysoxylum cyrtobotryum
- Elaeagnus latifolia
- Elaeocarpus griffithii
- Ellipeiopsis cherrevensis
- Euonymus indicus
- Ficus annulata
- Ficus capillipes
- Ficus chatacea
- Ficus fistuiosa
- Ficus hirta
- Ficus subpisocarpa
- Ficus triloba
- Flacourtia indica
- Flacourtia rukam
- Gardenia coronaria
- Garuga pinnata
- Geisemium elegans
- Gironniera subequalis
- Gtochidion obscurum
- Gtycosmis puberula
- Gymnema griffithii
- Harpullia cupanioides
- Hunteria zeylanica
- Hydnocarpus ilicifolia
- Hymenopyramis brachiata
- Ilex umbellulata
- Illigera trifotiata
- Iodes cirrhosa
- Jasminum harmandianum
- Knema tenuinervia
- Leptopus diplospermus
- Litchi chinensis
- Lithocarpus macphailii
- Lithocarpus trachycarpus
- Litsea glutinosa
- Litsea ochracea
- Mallotus barbatus
- Mallotus philippensis
- Mallotus subpeltatus
- Mammea siamensis
- Melastoma malabathricum
- Melientha suavis
- Micromelum falcatum
- Mitrephora keithii
- Mitrephora winitii
- Momordica charantia
- Momordica cochinchinensis
- Murraya sp.
- Neuropeitis racemosa
- Passiflora foetida
- Passiflora siamica
- Payena lanceolata
- Phrynium pubinerve
- Phyllanthus collinsiae
- Picrasma javanica
- Pimelodendron griffithianum
- Plectocomiopsis geminiflora
- Polyalthia simiarum
- Pomatocalpa maculosum
- Premna serratifolia
- Pseuduvaria rugosa
- Reevesia pubescens
- Rhodoleia championii
- Rinorea bengalensis
- Ridsdalea sp.
- Sapindus trifoliatus
- Sauropus androgynus
- Schleichera oleosa
- Sindechites chinensis
- Siphonodon celastrineus
- Solanum erianthum
- Spondias pinnata
- Stephania pierrei
- Sterculia lanceolata
- Stereospermum colais
- Sumbaviopsis albicans
- Suregada multiflora
- Swintonia floribunda
- Syzygium gratum
- Syzygium polyanthum
- Tabernaemontana pandacaqui
- Terminatia alata
- Tetrastigma leucostaphyllum
- Tinospora sinensis
- Triadica cochinchinensis
- Turraea pubescens
- Uncaria cordata
- Uvaria rufa
- Viscum indosinense
- Vitex scabra
- Willughbeia edulis
- Wrightia arborea
- Xerospermum noronhianum
- Ziziphus calophylla

== Location ==
Kaeng Krachan National Park in overview PARO 3 (Phetchaburi branch)

3) Kaeng Krachan National Park in overview PARO 3 (Phetchaburi branch)

	National park
1	Ao Siam
2	Hat Wanakon
3	Kaeng Krachan
4	Khao Sam Roi Yot
5	Kui Buri
6	Namtok Huai Yang

	Wildlife sanctuary
7	Prince Chumphon North Park (upper)
	Non-hunting area
8	Cha-am
9	Khao Chaiyarat
10	Khao Krapuk– Khao Tao Mo

	Forest park
11	Cha-am
12	Huai Nam Sap
13	Khao Nang Phanthurat
14	Khao Ta Mong Lai
15	Klang Ao
16	Mae Ramphueng
17	Pran Buri
18	Thao Kosa

== See also ==
- Wildlife of Thailand
- Indochina
- List of national parks of Thailand
- DNP - Kaeng Krachan National Park
- List of Protected Areas Regional Offices of Thailand
