= Urostigma depressum =

Urostigma depressum can refer to the following plant species:

- Urostigma depressum Miq., a synonym of Ficus annulata Blume
- Urostigma depressum (Blume) Miq., a synonym of Ficus depressa Blume
