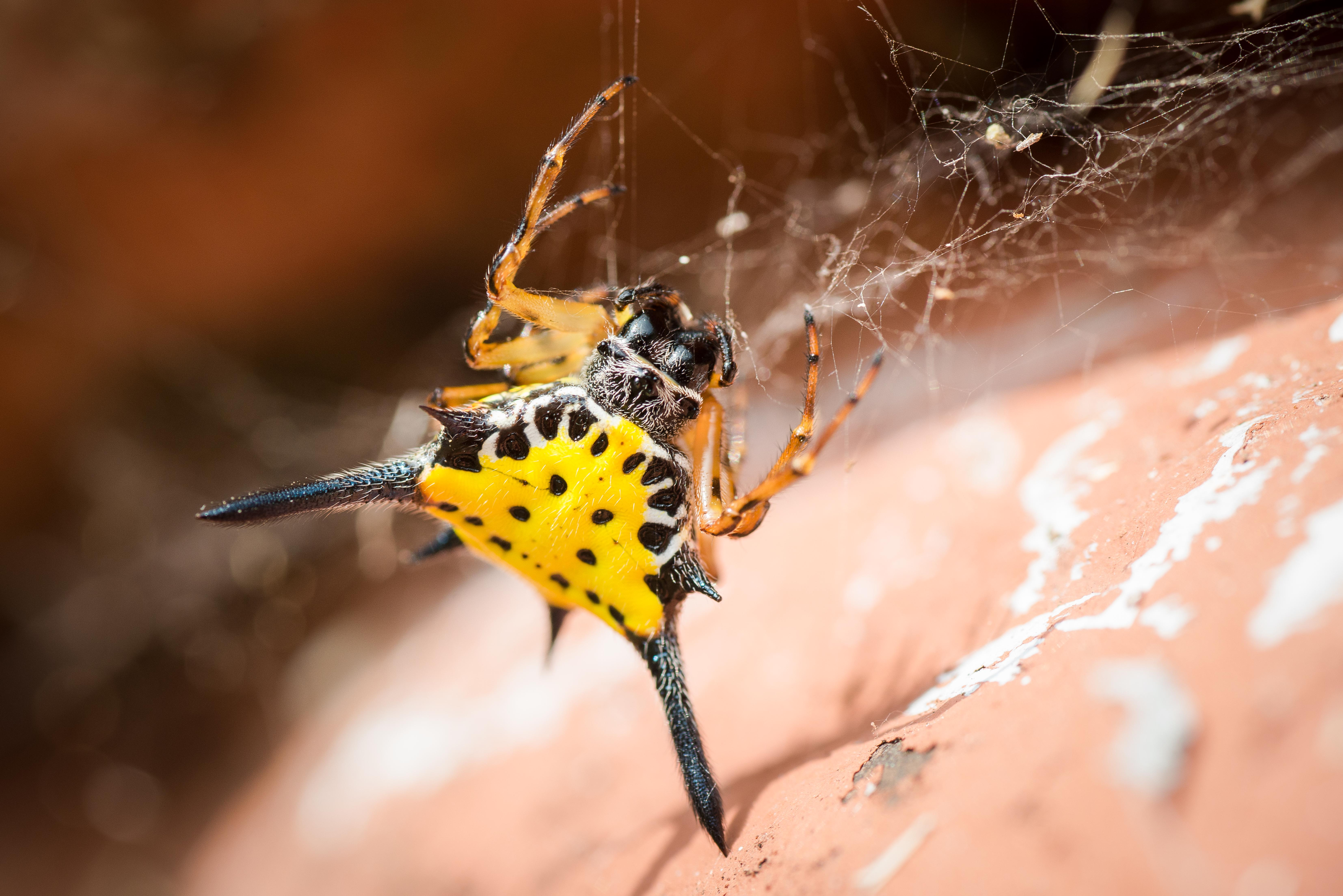
- In Kaeng Krachan National Park, Thailand

Scientific classification
- Kingdom: Animalia
- Phylum: Arthropoda
- Subphylum: Chelicerata
- Class: Arachnida
- Order: Araneae
- Infraorder: Araneomorphae
- Family: Araneidae
- Genus: Macracantha
- Species: M. hasselti

Binomial name
- Macracantha hasselti (C. L. Koch, 1837)

= Macracantha hasselti =

Hasselt's spiny spider

Macracantha hasselti is a species of spider belonging to the family Araneidae. It is a native of Asia, occurring from India eastwards to Indonesia.

Typical of this genus, the male of this species is small and undistinguished, but the female is larger and very colourful. It is usually around 8 mm in length, excluding the legs. The carapace has a dense covering of white hairs. The abdomen is roughly triangular and bright orange with 12 black spots arranged in two rows along the back and six black spikes around the margin, the two at the rear corners being the longest.

== Gallery ==
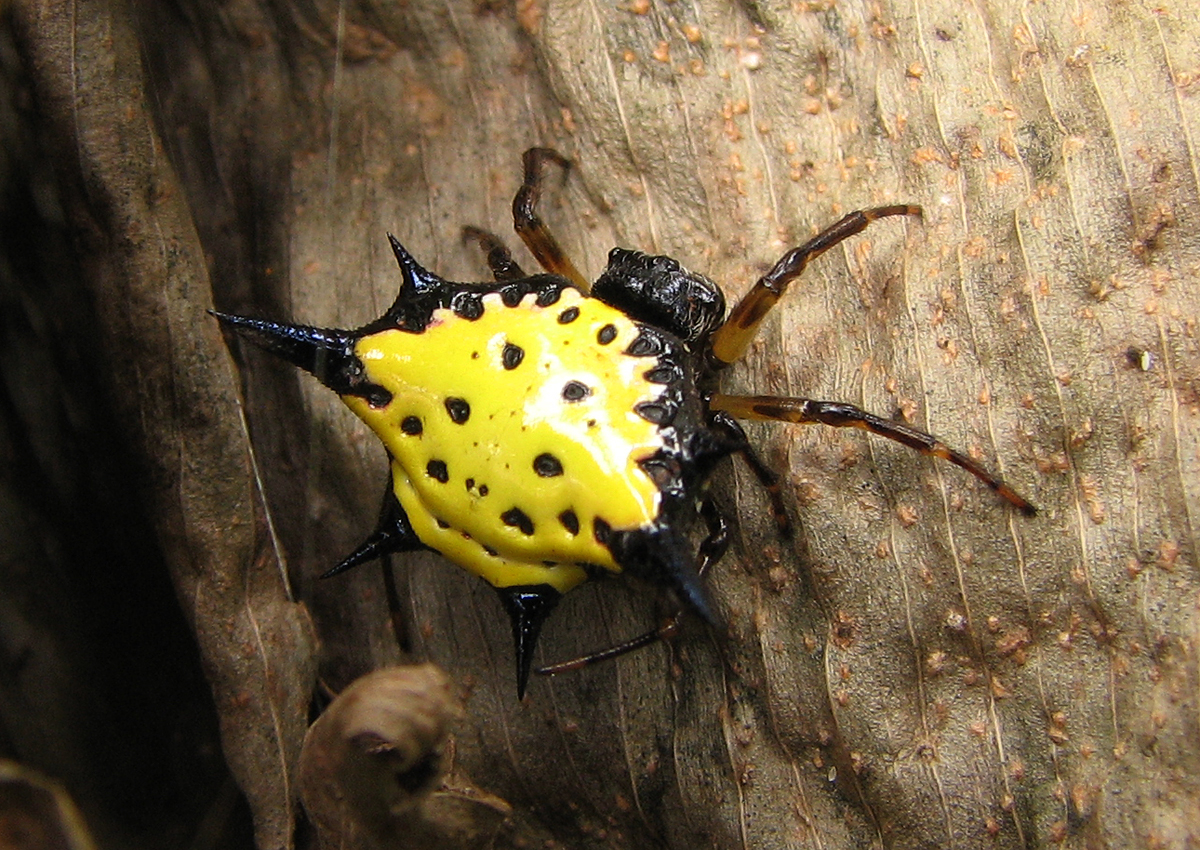

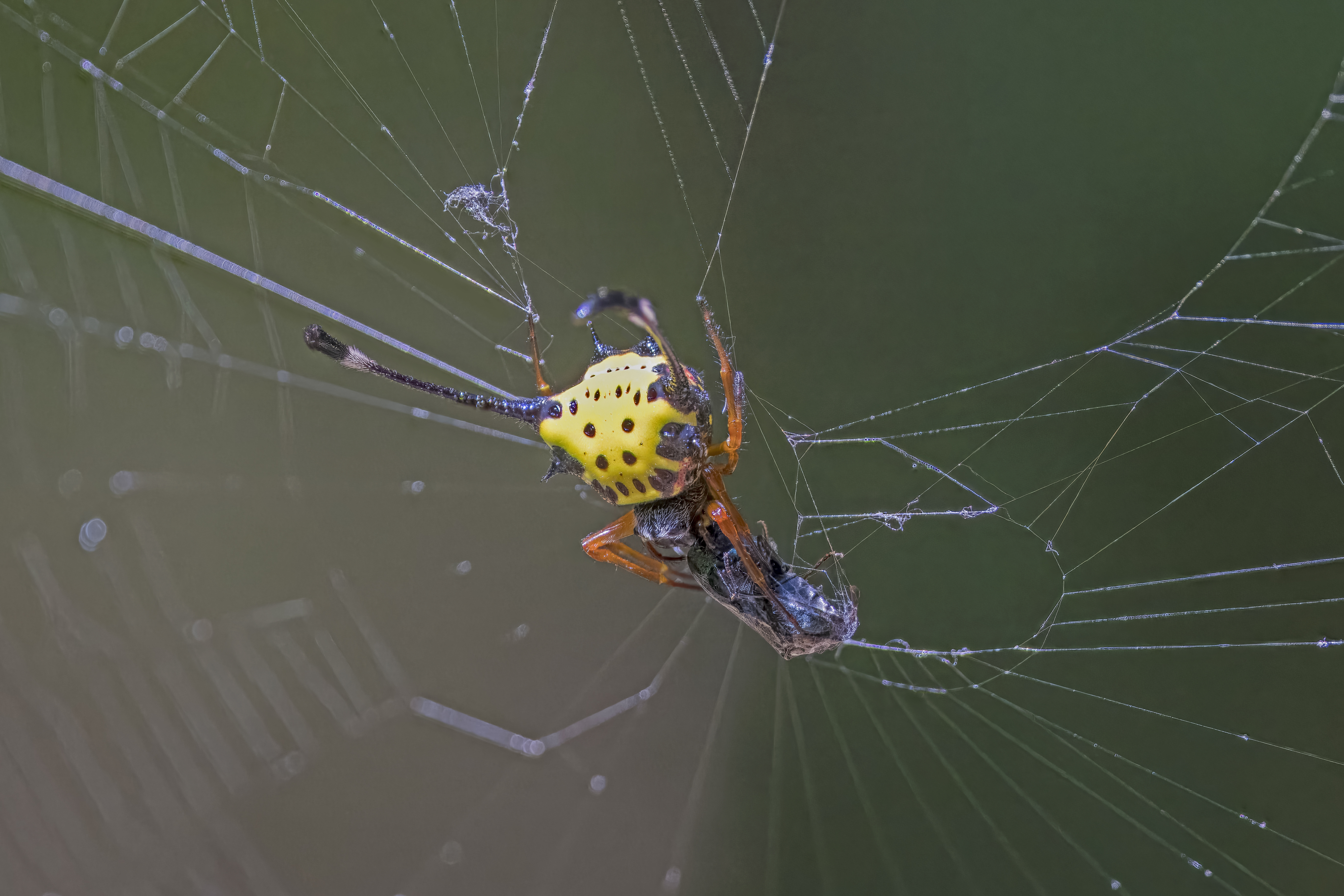
with prey

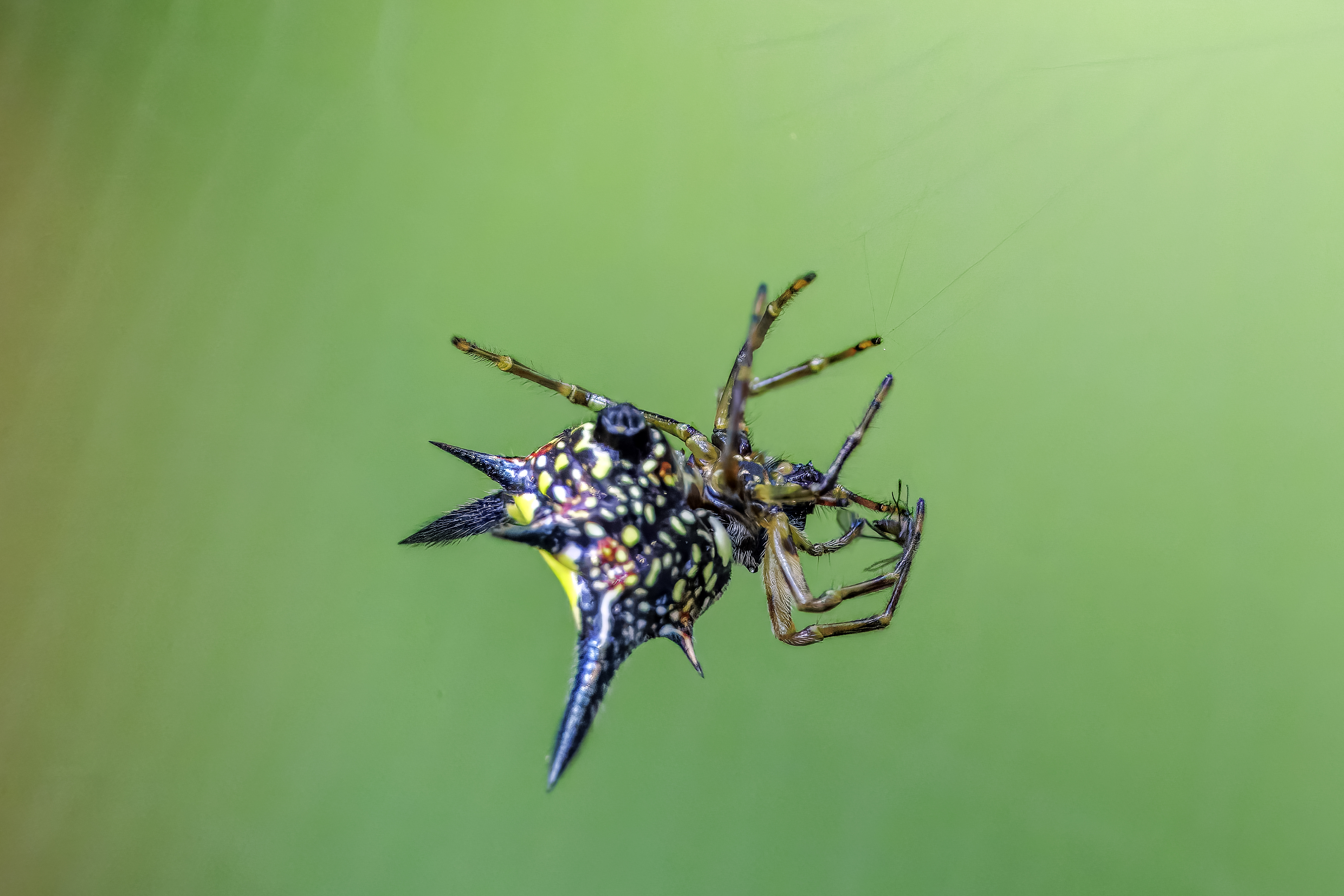
ventral side
