= Chaloem Phrakiat Thai Prachan National Park =

National park located in Ratchaburi Province, Thailand

- IUCN category II (national park)
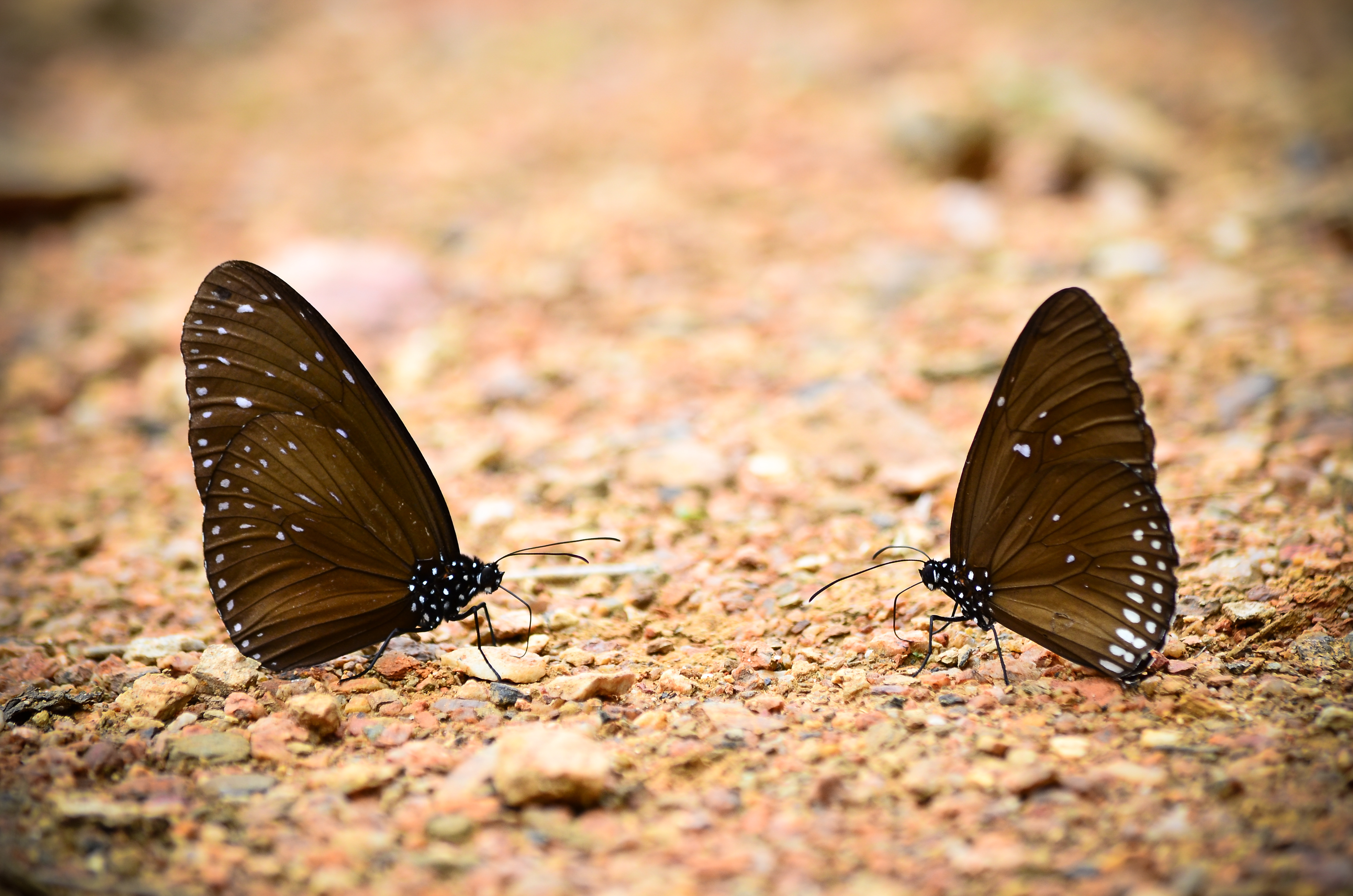
- Butterflies in the park
- Interactive map of Chaloem Phrakiat Thai Prachan National Park
- Location: Ratchaburi Province, Thailand
- Coordinates: 13°23′17.3″N 99°33′21.3″E
- Area: 328.05 km^{2} (126.66 sq mi)
- Established: 2012
- Governing body: Department of National Parks, Wildlife and Plant Conservation

UNESCO World Heritage Site
- Type: Natural
- Criteria: X
- Designated: 2021
- Part of: Kaeng Krachan Forest Complex
- Reference no.: 1461
- Region: Asia-Pacific

Chaloem Phrakiat Thai Prachan National Park is a national park located in Ratchaburi Province, Thailand. It was established on 25 January 2012 and encompasses 329.24 square kilometres (127.12 sq mi) or 205,777 Rai. It is part of the Kaeng Krachan Forest Complex UNESCO World Heritage Site, which also includes two other national parks, Kui Buri and Kaeng Krachan. It is managed by the Department of National Parks, Wildlife and Plant Conservation.

During the Communist insurgency in Thailand (1965–1983), the area was a stronghold of the Communist Party of Thailand before the government regained control.

== Plants ==
There are mixed deciduous forests in the west of the park. Plants include:

- Afzelia
- barking deer's mango (Irvingia malayana)
- bastard cedar (Guazuma ulmifolia)
- beleric myrobalan (Terminalia bellirica)
- Burma padauk (Pterocarpus macrocarpus)
- Ceylon oak (Schleichera)
- Garuga pinnata
- hog plum
- ironwood (Toona ciliata)
- Simpoh air (Dillenia suffruticosa)
- Thai bungor (Lagerstroemia loudonii)

Dry evergreen forests occupy the west and north, with plants including:

- Burmese grape
- bungor
- crown flower
- ironwood
- mesawa
- monkey jack
- orange champak
- resin tree
- Siamese neem

Ground plants include:

- Bambusa nutans (see List of bamboo species)
- Cephalostachyum virgatum
- palm
- rattan

== Animals ==
These include:

- Asian wild dog
- Asiatic golden cat
- bear
- boar
- Burmese hare
- common palm civet
- barking deer
- mouse deer
- Sambar deer
- East Asian porcupine
- flying lemur
- guar
- hog badger
- Javan mongoose
- Malayan pangolin
- monkey
- moonrat
- langur
- gibbon

Birds include:

- Asian barred owlet
- Asian paradise flycatcher
- bulbul
- drongo
- eagle
- forktail
- greater coucal
- green-billed malkoha
- green leafbird
- black hornbill
- great hornbill
- oriental pied hornbill
- plain-pouched hornbill
- Tickell's brown hornbill
- common iora
- partridge
- common hill myna
- red junglefowl
- roller (Coraciidae)
- striated heron
- woodpecker

Amphibians include the Asian painted frog, golden tree frog and green paddy frog

Reptiles include the butterfly lizard (Leiolepis), monitor lizard and Siamese softshell turtle.

Fishes include:

- beardless barb
- blue danio
- golden mahseer
- Indian river barb
- loach
- redtail rasbora
- red-tailed snakehead
- Siamese glassfish
- sidestripe rasbora
- striped tiger nandid (Pristolepis fasciata)
- swamp barb

== Climate ==
The annual precipitation is normally 1,000 to 2,000 millimetres (39 to 79 in), with the rainy season being from May to October, and June and September usually being the wettest months.

March to May are the hottest months, with temperatures of up to 35–40 °C (95–104 °F). November to February has lower humidity and temperatures ranging from 18 to 30 °C (64 to 86 °F).

== Location ==
Chaloem Phrakiat Thai Prachan National Park in overview PARO 3 (Ban Pong)

1) Thai Prachan National Park in overview PARO 3 (Ban Pong)

| | National park |
| 1 | Thai Prachan |
| 2 | Chaloem Rattanakosin |
| 3 | Erawan |
| 4 | Khao Laem |
| 5 | Khuean Srinagarindra |
| 6 | Lam Khlong Ngu |
| 7 | Phu Toei |
| 8 | Sai Yok |
| 9 | Thong Pha Phum |

| | Wildlife sanctuary |
| 10 | Mae Nam Phachi |
| 11 | Salak Phra |
| 12 | Thung Yai Naresuan West |
| | Forest park |
| 22 | Phra Thaen Dong Rang |
| 23 | Phu Muang |
| 24 | Tham Khao Noi |

| | Non-hunting area |
| 13 | Bueng Kroengkawia– Nong Nam Sap |
| 14 | Bueng Chawak |
| 15 | Khao Pratap Chang |
| 16 | Phantai Norasing |
| 17 | Somdet Phra Srinagarindra |
| 18 | Tham Khang Khao– Khao Chong Phran |
| 19 | Tham Lawa– Tham Daowadueng |
| 20 | Wat Rat Sattha Kayaram |
| 21 | Wat Tham Rakhang– Khao Phra Non |

== Tourism ==
November to February, the cooler months, constitute the peak tourist season. Activities include hiking and birdwatching. There are bungalows and camping areas.

== See also ==
- List of national parks of Thailand
- PARO 3 (Ban Pong)
