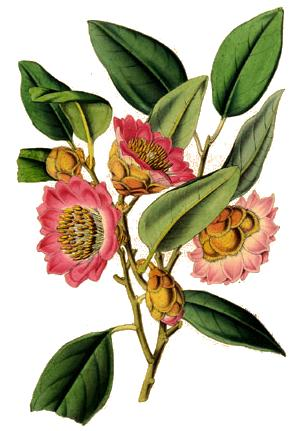
- Rhodoleia championii

Scientific classification
- Kingdom: Plantae
- Clade: Tracheophytes
- Clade: Angiosperms
- Clade: Eudicots
- Order: Saxifragales
- Family: Hamamelidaceae
- Subfamily: Rhodoleioideae
- Genus: Rhodoleia; Champ. ex Hook.

Species
- 6, see text

= Rhodoleia =

Genus of plants

Rhodoleia is a genus of plants in the family Hamamelidaceae. It includes six species which range from southern China to northern Indochina, Peninsular Malaysia, and Sumatra. Together with its sister genus Exbucklandia, Rhodoleia forms the sister clade to the other 25 genera of Hamamelidaceae. Flowers of Rhodoleia are bird-pollinated. Nectar-foraging birds including Japanese white-eyes (Zosterops japonicus, Zosteropidae) and fork-tailed sunbirds (Aethopyga christinae, Nectariniidae), avidly visit the flowers, which they also pollinate in the process.

== Species ==
Six species are accepted.

- Rhodoleia championii Hook.
- Rhodoleia forrestii Chun ex Exell
- Rhodoleia henryi K.Y.Tong
- Rhodoleia macrocarpa H.T.Chang
- Rhodoleia parvipetala K.Y.Tong
- Rhodoleia stenopetala H.T.Chang
