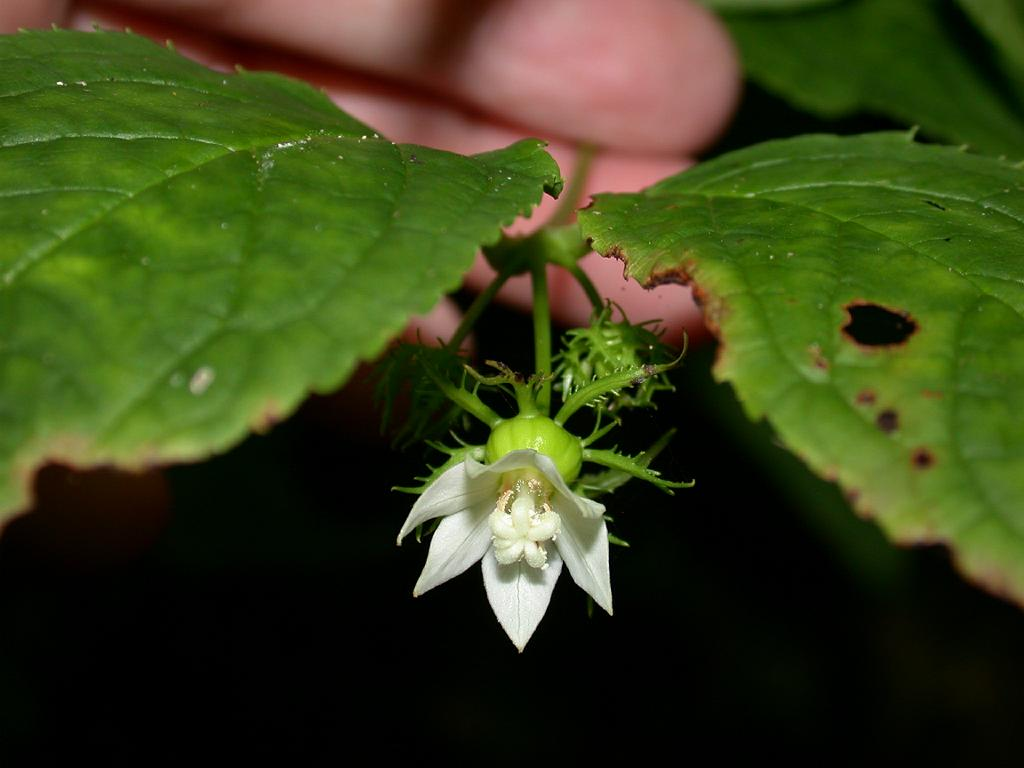
- Cyclocodon lancifolius.

Scientific classification
- Kingdom: Plantae
- Clade: Tracheophytes
- Clade: Angiosperms
- Clade: Eudicots
- Clade: Asterids
- Order: Asterales
- Family: Campanulaceae
- Subfamily: Campanuloideae
- Genus: Cyclocodon; Griff. ex Hook.f. & Thomson

= Cyclocodon =

Genus of flowering plants

Cyclocodon is a genus of flowering plants belonging to the family Campanulaceae.

Its native range is Tropical and Subtropical Asia.

Species:

- Cyclocodon axillaris (Oliv.) W.J.de Wilde & Duyfjes
- Cyclocodon lancifolius (Roxb.) Kurz
- Cyclocodon parviflorus (Wall. ex A.DC.) Hook.f. & Thomson
