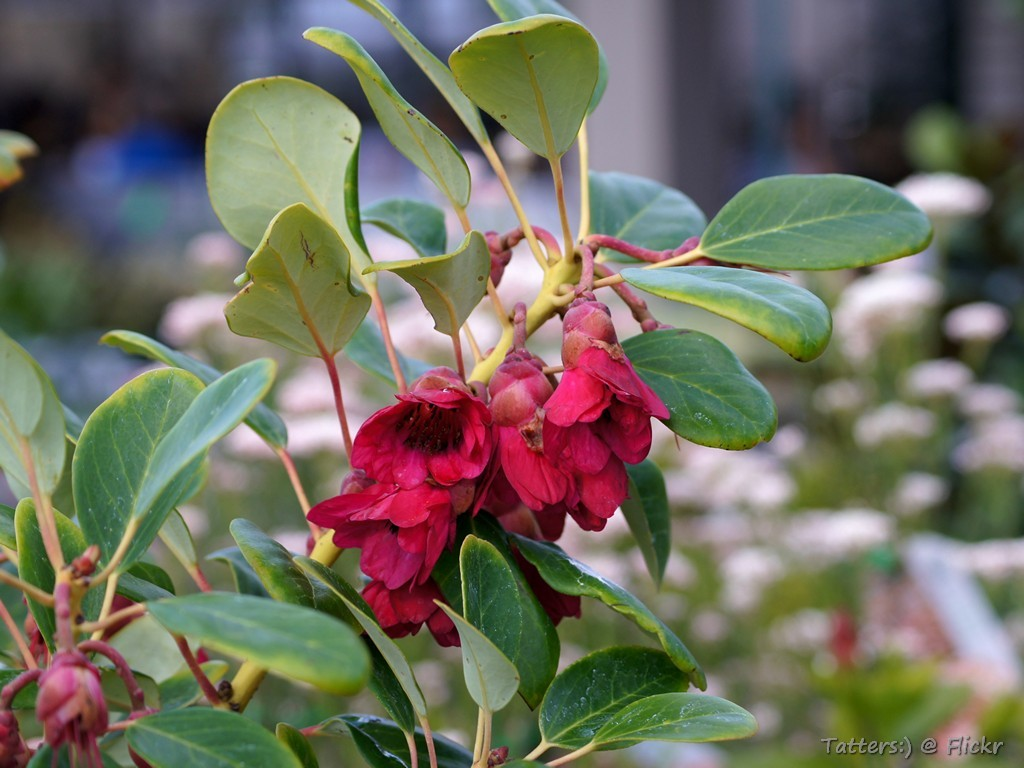

Conservation status
- Least Concern (IUCN 3.1)

Scientific classification
- Kingdom: Plantae
- Clade: Tracheophytes
- Clade: Angiosperms
- Clade: Eudicots
- Order: Saxifragales
- Family: Hamamelidaceae
- Genus: Rhodoleia
- Species: R. championii

Binomial name
- Rhodoleia championii Hook.f.

Synonyms
- Rhodoleia championii var. brilletii Lecomte; Rhodoleia forrestii Chun et Exell; Rhodoleia parvipetala Tong

= Rhodoleia championii =

Species of plant

Rhodoleia championii, the Hong Kong rose, is a species of plant in the family Hamamelidaceae. It is a small evergreen tree with dangling scarlet flowers that are pollinated primarily by birds, and is found in China, Indonesia, Malaysia, Myanmar and Vietnam.

== Description ==
Rhodoleia championii is a small evergreen tree growing to a height of about 12 m (40 ft). The bark is smooth and dark brown. The leathery, glossy-green leaves are stalked, oblong or obovate, measuring 7 to 16 cm (2.8 to 6.3 in) by 4.5 to 10.5 cm (1.8 to 4.1 in). The leaf base is broadly tapering and the apex is obtuse or widely acute. The underside of the leaf is greyish, usually smooth but sometime with the remains of stellate brown scales. The scarlet flowers are borne on short peduncles in the axils of the leaves, and are pendulous, 3 to 4 cm (1.2 to 1.6 in) long and 2.5 to 3.5 cm (1.0 to 1.4 in) wide. Each flower has several whorls of rounded bracts, many spatulate petals, stamens the same length as the petals and a slightly shorter style. The fruit is a five-chambered capsule containing flattened, yellowish-brown seeds.

== Distribution ==
This species is a native of southeastern Asia. Its range extends from Myanmar, Malaysia and Vietnam to China and Indonesia. It occurs in both lowland and upland primary and secondary forests. It was first found growing in Hong Kong in 1848, but has since been propagated there to increase the number of specimens in the wild.

== Ecology ==
The flowers of R. championii are mainly pollinated by birds; at one site in the Nankunshan National Forest Park in the Guangdong Province of China, the flowers were observed to be visited by seven different species of nectar-foraging birds, the most common visitors being Swinhoe's white-eyes (Zosterops simplex) and fork-tailed sunbirds (Aethopyga christinae). The flowers were also visited to a limited extent by bumblebees and honey bees.

In the Dongguan Mt.Yinping Forest Park in Guangdong, China it is the dominant tree along with Pinus hwangshanensis, and the main constituents of the shrub layer are the grass Miscanthus floridulus and the bamboo Indocalamus tessellatus.

== Status ==
Rhodoleia championii has a wide range and grows in both primary and secondary forests, regenerating freely in cleared land and beside roads, and the International Union for Conservation of Nature has assessed its conservation status as being of "least concern". It is considered a "vulnerable species" in China.
