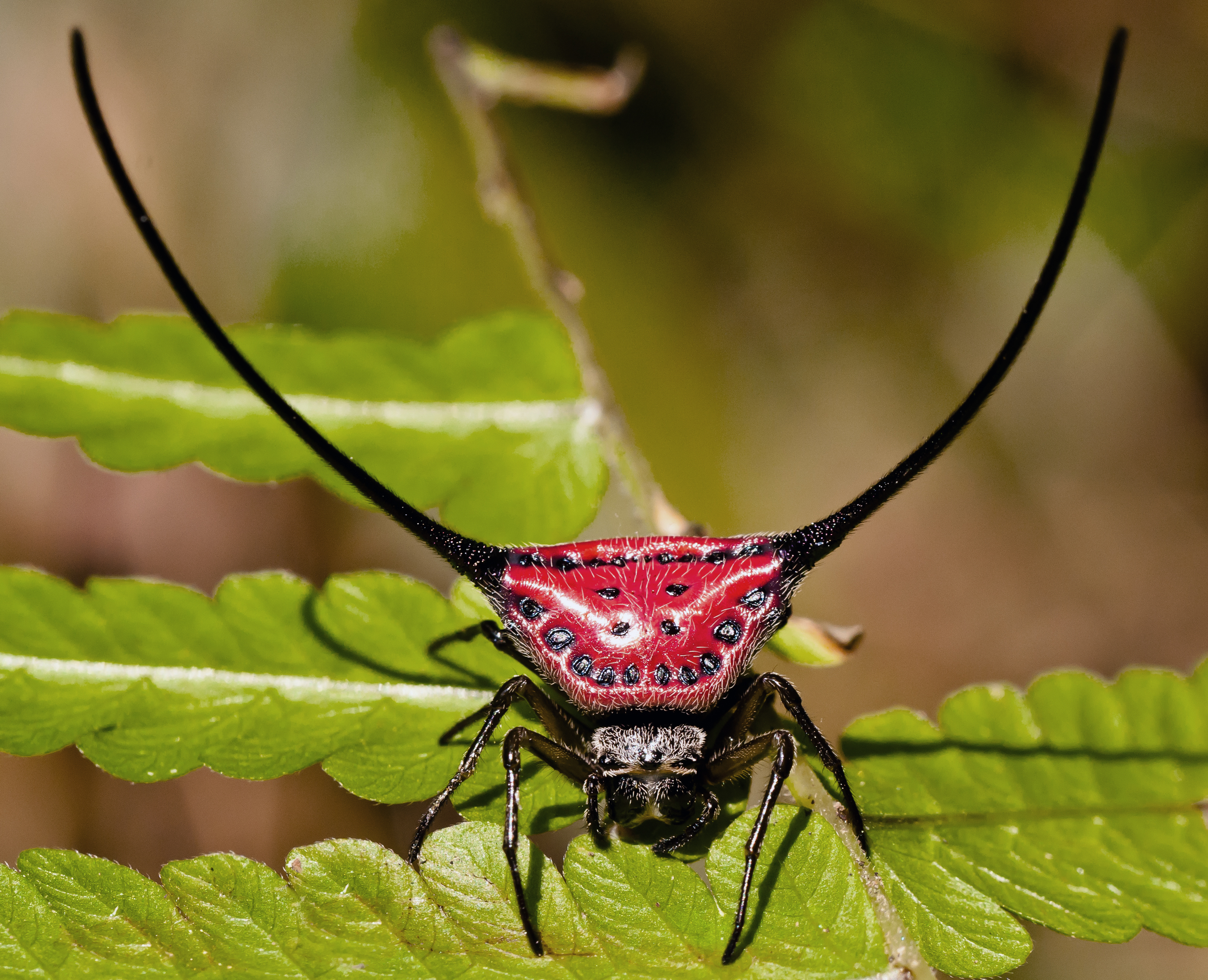

Scientific classification
- Kingdom: Animalia
- Phylum: Arthropoda
- Subphylum: Chelicerata
- Class: Arachnida
- Order: Araneae
- Infraorder: Araneomorphae
- Family: Araneidae
- Genus: Macracantha; Simon, 1864
- Species: M. arcuata

Binomial name
- Macracantha arcuata (Fabricius, 1793)

= Macracantha =

Genus of Asian orb-weaver spiders

Macracantha is a genus of Asian orb-weaver spiders recognized as containing the species, Macracantha arcuata., although some schemes also recognise inclusion of Gasteracantha hasselti in this genus. Macracantha is notable for the extremely long, curved spines on the abdomens of female members of the genus; Eugène Simon created the taxon name from Ancient Greek μακρός (makrόs), meaning "big", and ἄκανθα (ákantha), meaning "spine". It occurs from India and China through Southeast Asia to Indonesia.

== Description ==
The females of this genus have tough, shell-like abdomens armed with three pairs of spines. The spectacular middle (median) spines project upward and outward, curving in toward each other along their length. They are up to three times as long (20–26 mm) as the abdomen is wide (8–9 mm). The front (anterior) and rear (posterior) spines are short, relatively inconspicuous, and roughly equal in length.

The upper surface of the female abdomen ranges from yellow to red or even white or black and is marked with black sigilla. The ventral surface of the abdomen bears yellow or orange marks, and the median spines can show a bluish iridescence.

The male of the species measures only 1.5 mm, with stout, conical spines.

== Taxonomy ==
The taxon was first described by Eugène Simon in 1864 as a subgenus of Gasteracantha, and was raised to genus status in 1974 by Michel Emerit.

M. arcuata was historically included in the genus Gasteracantha. A 2019 study examining three mitochondrial and two nuclear genes found that M. arcuata is allied with Gasteracantha hasselti and Actinacantha globulata and that Gasteracantha is paraphyletic with respect to Macracantha, Actinacantha, and Thelacantha. The authors, however, did not propose generic reassignments based on their data.

== Ecology ==
Female M. arcuata build orb webs three or four feet wide in forested areas. These webs have hollow hubs and white silk beads on the radial threads. Siliwal and Molur report that females were more often observed on the underside of leaves near their webs than hanging in the center of the web.

Based on a study in Singapore, the species appears to depend heavily on primary tropical forest.
