= Xerospermum =

Scientific classification
- Kingdom: Plantae
- Clade: Tracheophytes
- Clade: Angiosperms
- Clade: Eudicots
- Clade: Rosids
- Order: Sapindales
- Family: Sapindaceae
- Subfamily: Sapindoideae
- Tribe: Nephelieae
- Genus: Xerospermum; Blume, 1850

Genus of flowering plants

Xerospermum is a small genus of Asian plants belonging to the family Sapindaceae.

== Species ==
Plants of the World Online currently (February 2024) includes:

1. Xerospermum laevigatum Radlk. - Bangladesh, Indochina (not Vietnam), West Malesia
2. Xerospermum noronhianum (Blume) Blume - Bangladesh, Indochina, West Malesia

Note: at least 19 species names of this genus, including X. bonii (Lecomte) Radlk., are now considered synonymous with the type species, which is X. noronhianum.

- Xerospermum cochinchinense and X. laoticum Gagnep. are now synonyms of Nephelium hypoleucum Kurz
