= Ilex umbellulata =

- A tree in Bangladesh

Scientific classification
- Kingdom: Plantae
- Clade: Tracheophytes
- Clade: Angiosperms
- Clade: Eudicots
- Clade: Asterids
- Order: Aquifoliales
- Family: Aquifoliaceae
- Genus: Ilex
- Species: I. umbellulata

Binomial name
- Ilex umbellulata (Wall.) Loes.

Synonyms
- Ehretia umbellulata Wall.; Ilex sulcata Wall. ex Hook.f.; Ilex godajam var. sulcata (Wall. ex Hook.f.) Kurz; Ilex umbellulata var. megalophylla Loes.; Pseudehretia umbellulata (Wall.) Turczaninow

Species of holly

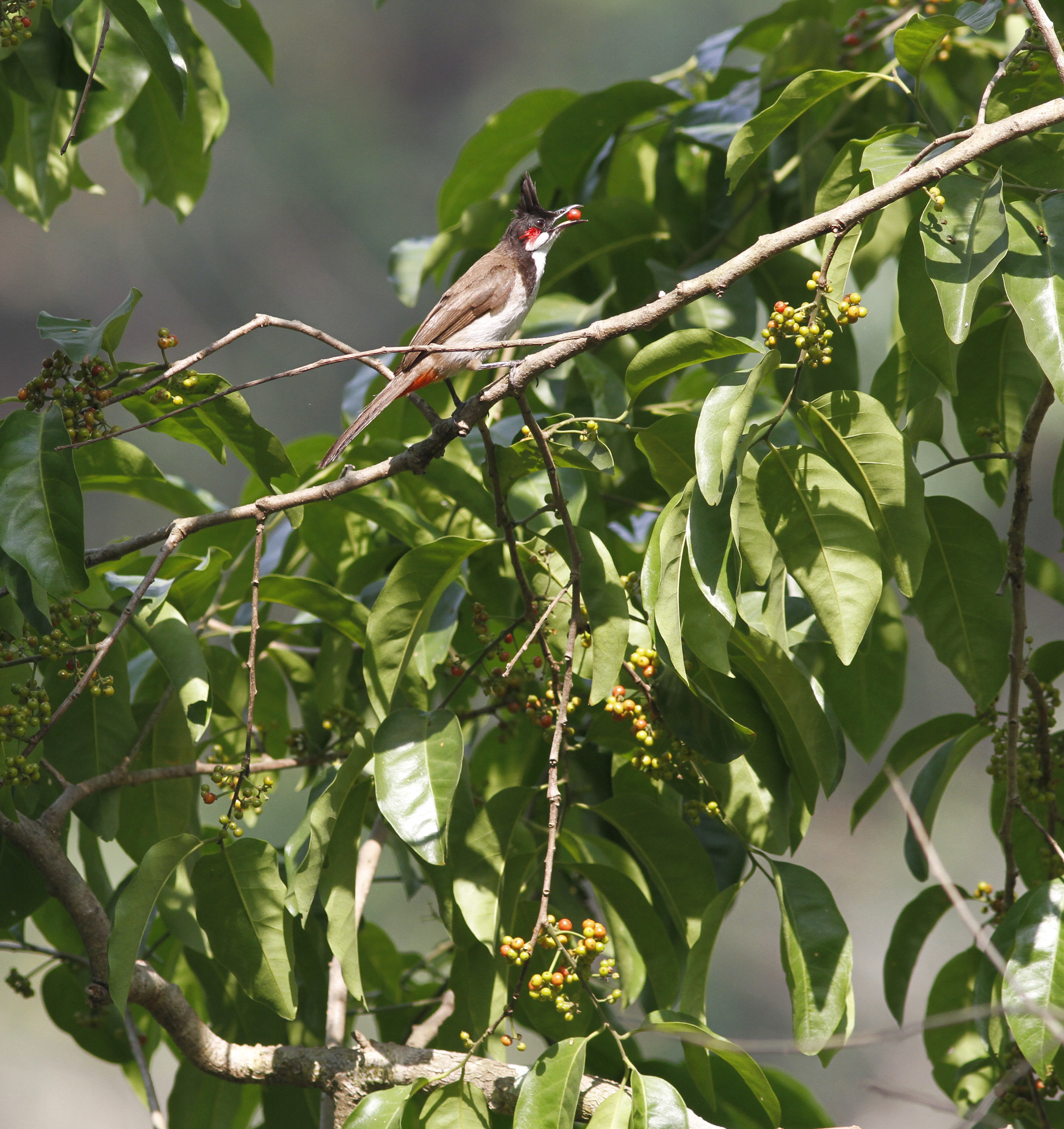
A red-whiskered bulbul feeds upon the ripening fruit of Ilex umbellulata

Ilex umbellulata is an evergreen tree species related to holly, generally four to fifteen metres in height. It is found in Southeast Asia. This tree is most often found growing in forests.

== Taxonomy ==
The species was first described from West Bengal, or possibly Myanmar, or possibly Assam, by Nathaniel Wallich in 1824, who named the species Ehretia umbellulata. Wallich classified the genus in the botanical family Boraginaceae at the time. In 1901 the German Aquifoliaceae specialist Ludwig Eduard Theodor Lösener moved the species to the genus Ilex. Wallich did not properly designate a holotype (or any types) for his taxon, therefore in 1985 a specimen (EICH4329) collected in 1822 (probably near the city of Sylhet, Bangladesh, although the label is ambiguous), was selected as the holotype from among the specimens in the East India Company Herbarium collection housed at Kew Botanical Gardens. The specimen is not completely ideal: it is mounted on the same sheet as the holotype of I. godajam. There are also a number of isotypes with the same collection number housed at Kew.

== Description ==
Ilex umbellulata is a spreading, evergreen tree or shrub, reaching up to fifteen, exceptionally eighteen, metres in height, and with glabrous branchlets. The bark is grey-brown. The glabrous leaves have an ovate, elliptic or oblong shape, with 1-2 cm long petioles, an entire margin, and minute stipules. Flowers are small, pale white and fragrant. The plants flower and fruit in April to September in Bangladesh, but flowers from May to September, fruiting July to November in Yunnan.

== Distribution ==
The distribution includes the Andaman Islands, Assam, Bangladesh, the eastern Himalayan region of India, China (restricted to Yunnan), Myanmar, the Nicobar Islands, Thailand, Laos, and Vietnam.

The tree is only found in Kaptai National Park and the forest of Khagrachari in Bangladesh. It is a very rare tree in Bangladesh.

== Ecology ==
Ilex umbellulata occurs at altitudes of 500 to 1,700 metres in Yunnan. The species is most often found growing in a habitat of evergreen broadleaf forests or on sparsely-forested slopes in China. It occurs in both primary and secondary woodland in Bangladesh. The fruit is edible and most of the local fruit-eating bird species visit during the fruiting period.
