= Xerospermum noronhianum =

Scientific classification
- Kingdom: Plantae
- Clade: Tracheophytes
- Clade: Angiosperms
- Clade: Eudicots
- Clade: Rosids
- Order: Sapindales
- Family: Sapindaceae
- Genus: Xerospermum
- Species: X. noronhianum

Binomial name
- Xerospermum noronhianum (Blume) Blume

Synonyms
- List: Cupania glabrata; Euphoria noronhiana; Nephelium muricatum Radlk.; Nephelium noronhianum (Blume) Cambess.; Nephelium xerocarpum Cambess.; Sapindus glabratus Wall.; Xerospermum bonii (Lecomte) Radlk.; Xerospermum brachyphyllum Radlk.; Xerospermum cylindrocarpum Radlk.; Xerospermum donnaiense Gagnep.; Xerospermum echinulatum Radlk.; Xerospermum fallax Radlk.; Xerospermum ferrugineum C.E.C.Fisch.; Xerospermum glabratum (Kurz) Radlk.; Xerospermum glabratum Pierre; Xerospermum glabrum Pierre; Xerospermum intermedium Radlk.; Xerospermum lanceolatum Radlk.; Xerospermum macrophyllum Pierre; Xerospermum microcarpum Pierre; Xerospermum muricatum Radlk.; Xerospermum poilanei Gagnep.; Xerospermum testudineum Radlk.; Xerospermum tonkinense Radlk.; Xerospermum wallichii King; Xerospermum xanthophyllum Radlk.

Species of tree

Xerospermum noronhianum is a common Asian tree species described by Carl Ludwig von Blume: it is the type species in the genus and belongs to the Family Sapindaceae. X. noronhianum Blume is the accepted name and there are no subspecies listed in the Catalogue of Life. Morphologically, it is a very variable species, found in many kinds of tropical forests and soils, usually below 300 m altitude and rarely above 1000 m. Its light brown wood is hard and durable, often used in the construction of buildings.

== Description ==
Tree: 25–30 m high when fully grown, often with buttresses at the trunk base.

Leaves: Inflorescences up to 250 mm long if solitary, much shorter if tufted.

Flowers: tetramerous. Sepals free or slightly connate, the outer two usually slightly smaller than the inner ones, ovate to obovate, 1-3 by 1-2.4 mm, outside and inside glabrous or hairy (nearly always inside at the base). Petals: obovate to broadly spathulate, 1-2.8 by 0.5-1.7 mm, short- to long-clawed with an ovate to transversely elliptic blade, variably woolly, nearly always with the exception of the base outside, inside often sparsely hairy to glabrous. Stamens: 8 (sometimes 9).

Fruit: lobes ellipsoid to almost spherical: 17-50 by 12–50 mm, with a (very variable) rough, red or dark-brown surface.

There is considerable (but continuous) variation in this species: of leaves, flowers, and especially the fruits.

== Distribution and vernacular names ==
- Bangladesh
- Burma (Myanmar): taung-kyetmauk.
- India (Assam)
- Indonesia: rambutan pacet (Malay), burundul, corogol monyet tjorogol monjet (Sundanese)
- Laos: kho lên, ngèo
- Malaysia: geresek hitam, gigi buntal, rambutan pachet (Peninsular), balong ayam, kata keran
- Philippines
- Thailand: kho laen (eastern), kho hia (south-eastern), laen ban (peninsular).
- Viet Nam: Cây Trường
