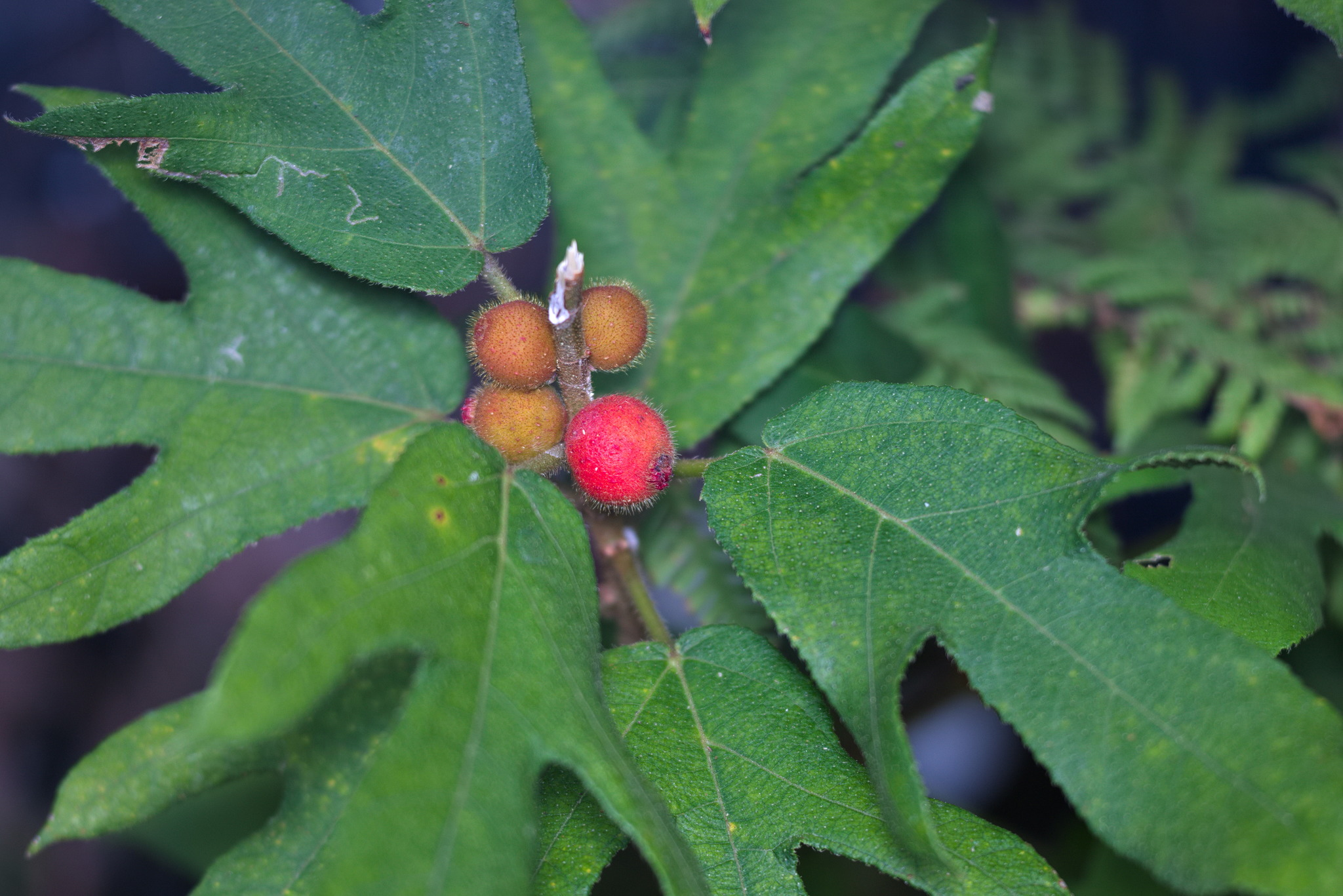

Conservation status
- Least Concern (IUCN 3.1)

Scientific classification
- Kingdom: Plantae
- Clade: Tracheophytes
- Clade: Angiosperms
- Clade: Eudicots
- Clade: Rosids
- Order: Rosales
- Family: Moraceae
- Tribe: Ficeae
- Genus: Ficus
- Subgenus: F. subg. Ficus
- Species: F. simplicissima

Binomial name
- Ficus simplicissima Lour.

Synonyms
- List: Ficus beecheyana f. tenuifolia Sata; Ficus cordata Ridl.; Ficus dumosa King; Ficus hibiscifolia Champ. ex Benth.; Ficus hirta Vahl; Ficus hirta var. appressa Corner; Ficus hirta subsp. dumosa (King) C.C.Berg; Ficus hirta var. dumosa (King) Corner; Ficus hirta var. hibiscifolia (Champ. ex Benth.) Chun; Ficus hirta var. imberbis Gagnep.; Ficus hirta var. integrifolia Miq.; Ficus hirta var. malayana Corner; Ficus hirta var. normalis Kuntze; Ficus hirta subsp. ochracea C.C.Berg; Ficus hirta var. palmatiloba (Merr.) Chun; Ficus hirta var. setosa (Blume) Miq.; Ficus katsumadae Hayata; Ficus laus-esquirolii H.Lév.; Ficus ochracea (C.C.Berg) C.C.Berg; Ficus palmatiloba Merr.; Ficus porteri H.Lév. & Vaniot; Ficus quangtriensis Gagnep.; Ficus setacea G.Lodd.; Ficus setifera Steud.; Ficus setosa Hook. & Arn.; Ficus setosa Blume; Ficus simplicissima var. hirta (Vahl) Migo; Ficus tournanensis Gagnep.; Ficus tridactylites Gagnep.; Ficus triloba subsp. quangtriensis (Gagnep.) C.C.Berg; Necalistis aspera Raf.

= Ficus simplicissima =

Species of fig tree from Asia

Ficus simplicissima, sometimes known as its synonym Ficus hirta, is a species of fig trees in the family Moraceae. This fig tree is similar to Ficus triloba. Its native range Assam, Bangladesh, Cambodia, South-Central and Southeast China, East Himalaya, Hainan, India, Java, Laos, Malaysia, Myanmar, Nepal, Sumatra, Thailand, and Vietnam.
