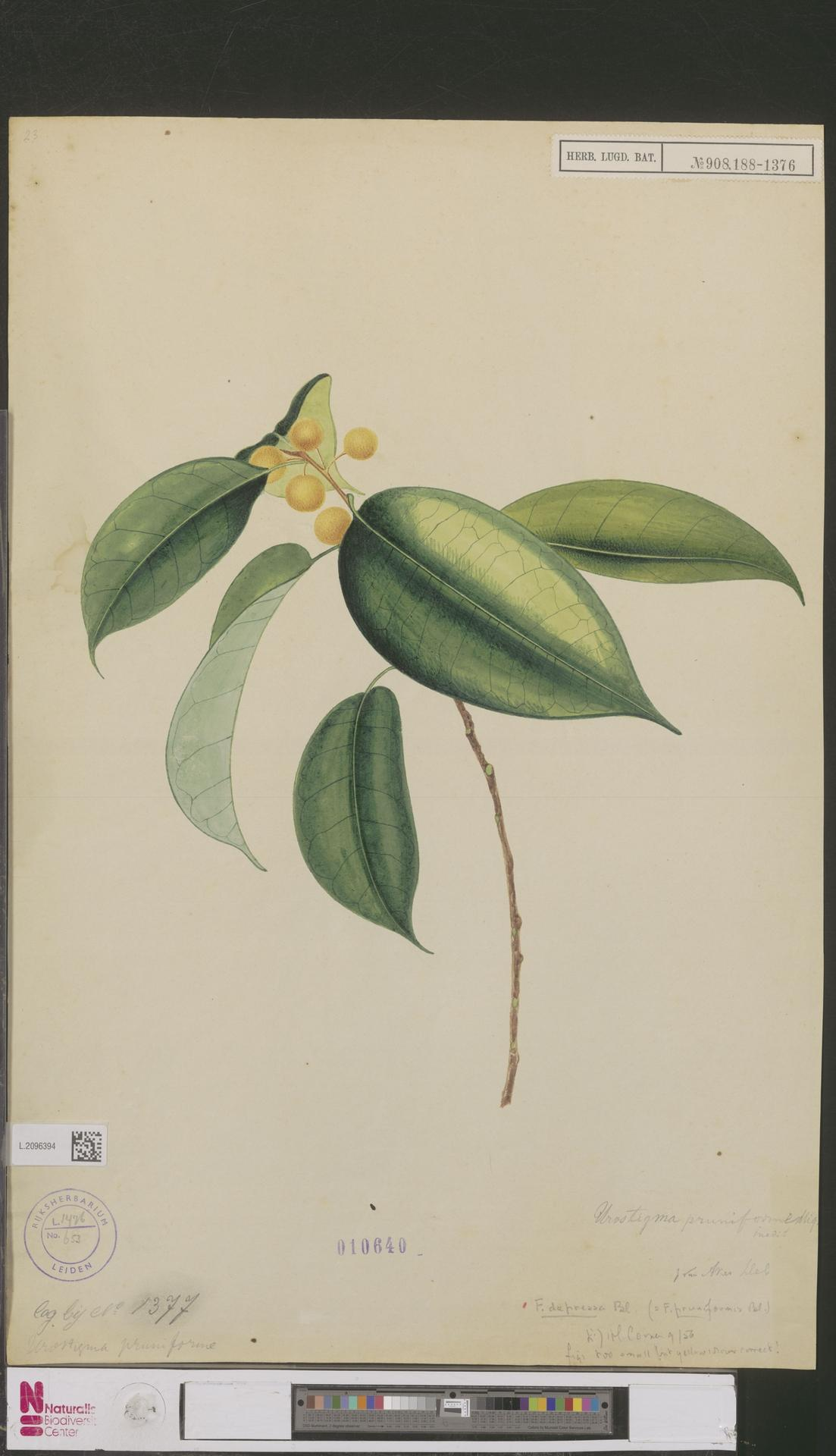

Conservation status
- Least Concern (IUCN 3.1)

Scientific classification
- Kingdom: Plantae
- Clade: Tracheophytes
- Clade: Angiosperms
- Clade: Eudicots
- Clade: Rosids
- Order: Rosales
- Family: Moraceae
- Genus: Ficus
- Subgenus: F. subg. Urostigma
- Species: F. depressa

Binomial name
- Ficus depressa Blume

Synonyms
- Ficus johnsonii Elmer; Ficus pruniformis Blume; Urostigma depressum (Blume) Miq.; Urostigma pruniforme (Blume) Miq.

= Ficus depressa =

Species of Asian fig

Ficus depressa is a banyan fig species in the family Moraceae. It is a tree native to parts of Indo-China (Thailand and Vietnam) and Malesia (Borneo, Java, the Lesser Sunda Islands, Peninsular Malaysia, the Philippines, and Sumatra) in Southeast Asia. In Vietnam it may be called sung xoài or đa nước.

The species was described by Carl Ludwig Blume in 1823. No subspecies are listed in the Catalogue of Life.
