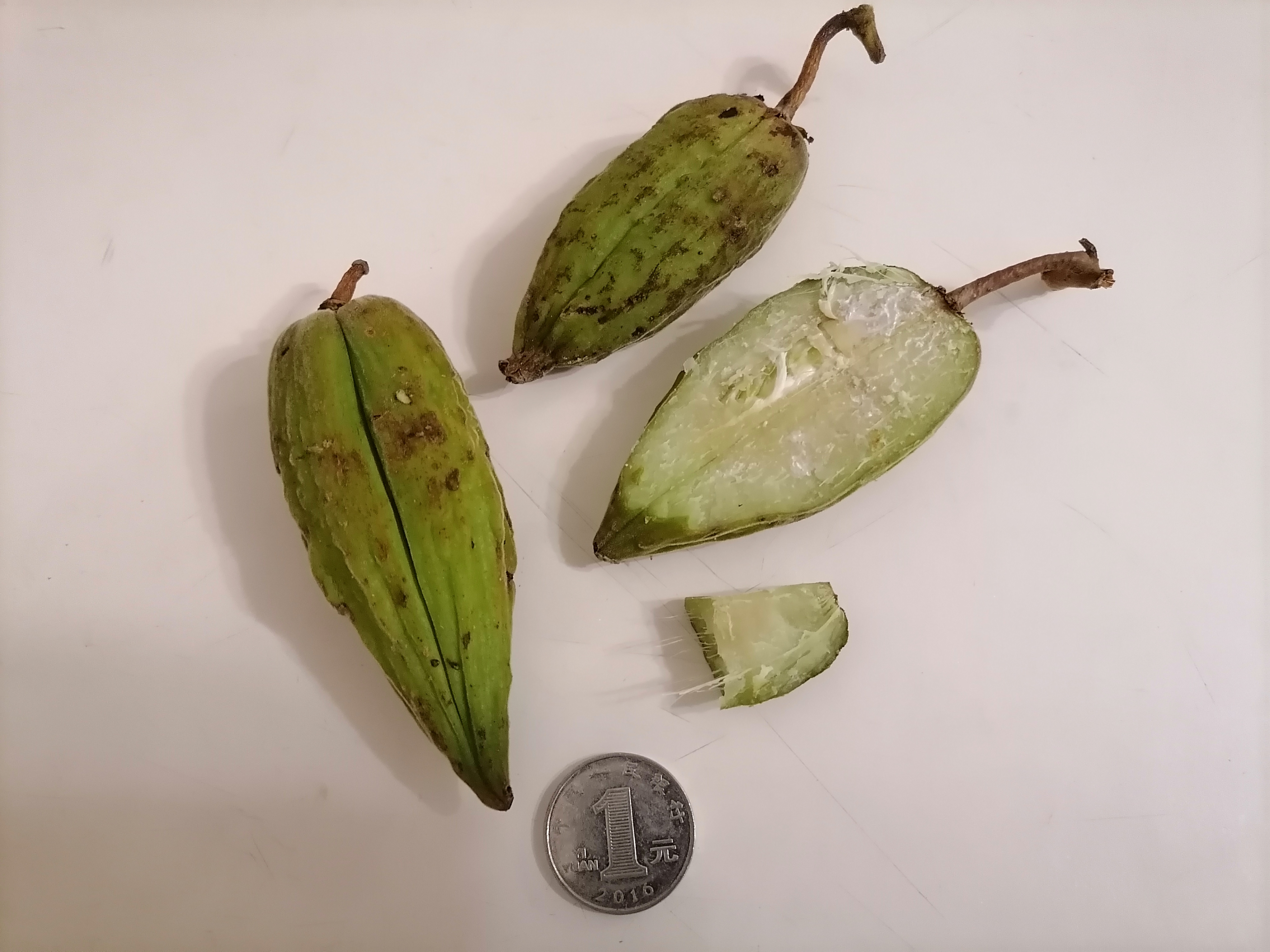
- Amalocalyx microlobus fruit

Scientific classification
- Kingdom: Plantae
- Clade: Tracheophytes
- Clade: Angiosperms
- Clade: Eudicots
- Clade: Asterids
- Order: Gentianales
- Family: Apocynaceae
- Subfamily: Apocynoideae
- Tribe: Apocyneae
- Genus: Amalocalyx; Pierre
- Species: A. microlobus

Binomial name
- Amalocalyx microlobus Pierre ex Spire

Synonyms
- Amalocalyx burmanicus Chatterjee; Amalocalyx yunnanensis Tsiang

= Amalocalyx =

Species of plant

Amalocalyx is a genus of plant in family Apocynaceae consisting of lianas often found clinging to trees. It was first described as a genus in 1898.

Three species names have been created in the genus. Some authors recognize all three as distinct species, but the World Checklist maintained by Kew Royal Botanic Garden considers the genus as constituting a single species, Amalocalyx microlobus.

These lianas are found in altitude ranges of 800–1,000 metres (2,600–3,300 ft) in Southern Yunnan (South-east China), Laos, Cambodia, Burma, Thailand, Vietnam, and western Malaysia.

Local names:

- Chinese: 毛车藤 (Pinyin for Mandarin: máo chē téng)
- Laotian: ຊີມ ([síːm]).
