= Diospyros apiculata =

Conservation status
- Least Concern (IUCN 2.3)

Scientific classification
- Kingdom: Plantae
- Clade: Tracheophytes
- Clade: Angiosperms
- Clade: Eudicots
- Clade: Asterids
- Order: Ericales
- Family: Ebenaceae
- Genus: Diospyros
- Species: D. apiculata

Binomial name
- Diospyros apiculata Hiern

Synonyms
- Diospyros pahangensis Bakh.; Diospyros similis Craib; Diospyros tamiriensis Lecomte

Species of tree

Diospyros apiculata is a tropical tree species was described by Hiern and included in the genus Diospyros and family Ebenaceae; no subspecies are listed in the Catalogue of Life. Its Vietnamese name is lọ nồi (sometimes thị đen).
