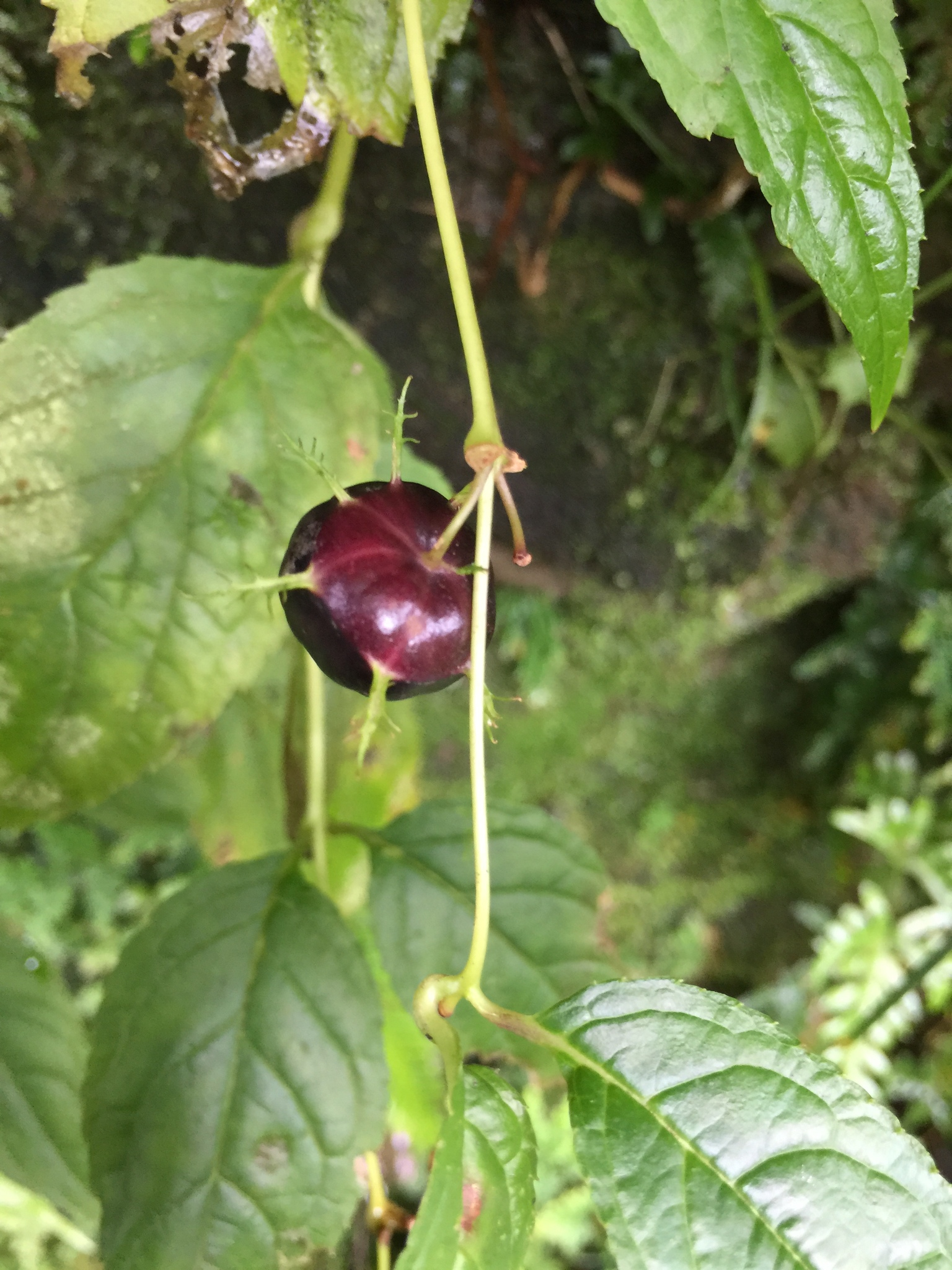
- In Taiwan

Scientific classification
- Kingdom: Plantae
- Clade: Tracheophytes
- Clade: Angiosperms
- Clade: Eudicots
- Clade: Asterids
- Order: Asterales
- Family: Campanulaceae
- Genus: Cyclocodon
- Species: C. lancifolius

Binomial name
- Cyclocodon lancifolius (Roxb.) Kurz

Synonyms
- List: Campanula celebica D.Dietr.; Campanula lancifolia Roxb.; Campanula truncata D.Dietr.; Campanumoea celebica Blume; Campanumoea lancifolia (Roxb.) Merr.; Campanumoea leucocarpa (Miq.) C.B.Clarke; Campanumoea truncata (Wall. ex G.Don) Endl.; Canarina moluccana Roxb.; Codonopsis albiflora Griff.; Codonopsis celebica (Blume) Miq.; Codonopsis lancifolia (Roxb.) Moeliono; Codonopsis lancifolia subsp. celebica (Blume) Moeliono; Codonopsis leucocarpa Miq.; Codonopsis truncata Wall. ex G.Don; Cyclocodon celebicus (Blume) D.Y.Hong; Cyclocodon lancifolius subsp. celebicus (Blume) K.E.Morris & Lammers; Cyclocodon leucocarpus Miq.; Cyclocodon truncatus (Wall. ex G.Don) Hook.f. & Thomson

= Cyclocodon lancifolius =

Plant species in the bellflower family

Cyclocodon lancifolius is a plant species in the family Campanulaceae. It is from southern and eastern Asia, and is known as 轮钟花 (lun zhong hua) in Chinese.

== Description ==
Cyclocodon lancifolius is a herbaceous plant that can be a perennial or annual. It has upright stems that are usually branched. At maturity, the stems range from as little as 30 cm (1 ft) to as much as 3 m (9.8 ft) tall, and can be woody at the base. Its stems are hollow and plants are usually hairless on all parts.

The leaves of Cyclocodon lancifolius are most often attached on opposite sides of the stems, but occasionally may be in whorls of three leaves. They range in shape from ovate, ovate-lanceolate, to lanceolate, egg shaped, to like the head of a spear. They measure 5–15 cm (2–6 in) long and 1–5 cm (0.4–2.0 in) wide.

Its fruit is a purple-black berry 5–10 mm (0.20–0.39 in) in diameter with numerous seeds. The seeds are elliptic and flattened.

== Taxonomy ==
Cyclocodon lancifolius was scientifically described by William Roxburgh as Campanula lancifolia in 1824. In 1872 it was moved by Wilhelm Sulpiz Kurz to Cyclocodon. However, in 1881 Charles Baron Clarke reduced Cyclocodon to a section in the genus Campanumoea. Following this Elmer Drew Merrill moved it to Campanumoea as Campanumoea lancifolia in 1923. In the 1990s evidence began to emerge that Cyclocodon should be reinstated. As of 2025 Cyclocodon lancifolius is listed as the accepted name in Plants of the World Online and World Flora Online.

=== Names ===
In Chinese it is known by the common name 轮钟花 (lun zhong hua). It is also marketed as 红果参 (hong guo shen).

== Range ==
The range of Cyclocodon lancifolius reaches from northeast India to through Southeast Asia to Japan. Adjacent to and east of India, its range includes Bangladesh, Cambodia, Myanmar, Nepal, Laos, and Vietnam. In the Indonesian archipelago it grows in Borneo, Java, the Maluku Islands, New Guinea, Sulawesi, and Sumatera. In mainland China, it is known from Chongqing, south Fujian, Guangdong, Guangxi, Guizhou, southwest Hubei, both southern and western Hunan, southern Jiangxi, Sichuan, and southeast Yunnan. It is also found on the islands of Hainan and Taiwan. Lastly, it is reported from the Ryukyu Islands of Japan, and on the Philippines.

The species grows in a variety of habitats including forests, thickets, and grasslands at altitudes up to 1,500 m (4,900 ft).

== Uses ==
The berries of Cyclocodon lancifolius are edible. The roots and leaves of the plant are used in folk medicine by ethnic minorities in Guizhou and Hunan Provinces in China.
