= Ficus triloba =

Conservation status
- Least Concern (IUCN 3.1)

Scientific classification
- Kingdom: Plantae
- Clade: Tracheophytes
- Clade: Angiosperms
- Clade: Eudicots
- Clade: Rosids
- Order: Rosales
- Family: Moraceae
- Tribe: Ficeae
- Genus: Ficus
- Subgenus: F. subg. Ficus
- Species: F. triloba

Binomial name
- Ficus triloba Buch.-Ham. ex Voigt

Synonyms
- Ficus esquiroliana H.Lév.; Ficus hirsuta Roxb., nom. illeg. homonym. post.; Ficus hirta var. roxburghii King; Ficus hirta var. roxburghiana A.M.Cowan & Cowan; Ficus hirta subsp. roxburghii (King) C.C.Berg; Ficus hirta var. squamosa Corner; Ficus hirta subsp. triloba (Buch.-Ham. ex Voigt) L.B.Chaudhary; Ficus hirta var. triloba (Buch.-Ham. ex Voigt) Kuntze; Ficus neoesquirolii H.Lév. , not validly publ.; Ficus roxburghii Miq., nom. illeg.; Ficus simplicissima var. roxburghii (King) Hong Qing Li & J.Lu

Species of fig tree from Asia

Ficus triloba is an Asian species of fig tree in the family Moraceae. Its native range is Sikkim to southern China, Indo-China and Sumatra. It is dioecious, with male and female flowers produced on separate individuals.

== Nomenclature ==
This species is similar to Ficus simplicissima and synonyms include: F. simplicissima var. roxburghii, F. esquiroliana and F. hirta var. roxburghii. The Global Biodiversity Information Facility lists this as a synonym of F. triloba Buch.-Ham. ex Wall.
