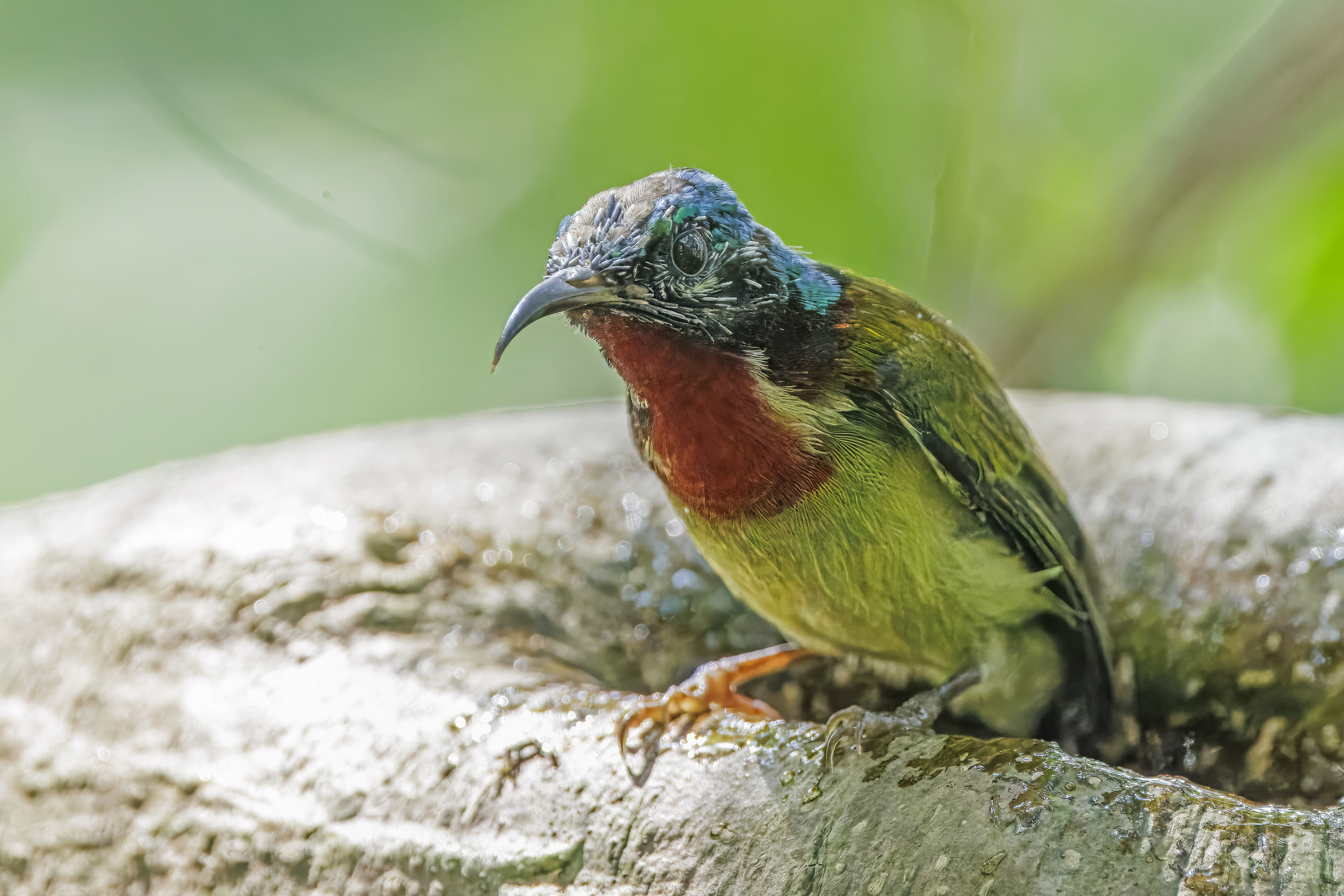
- Male
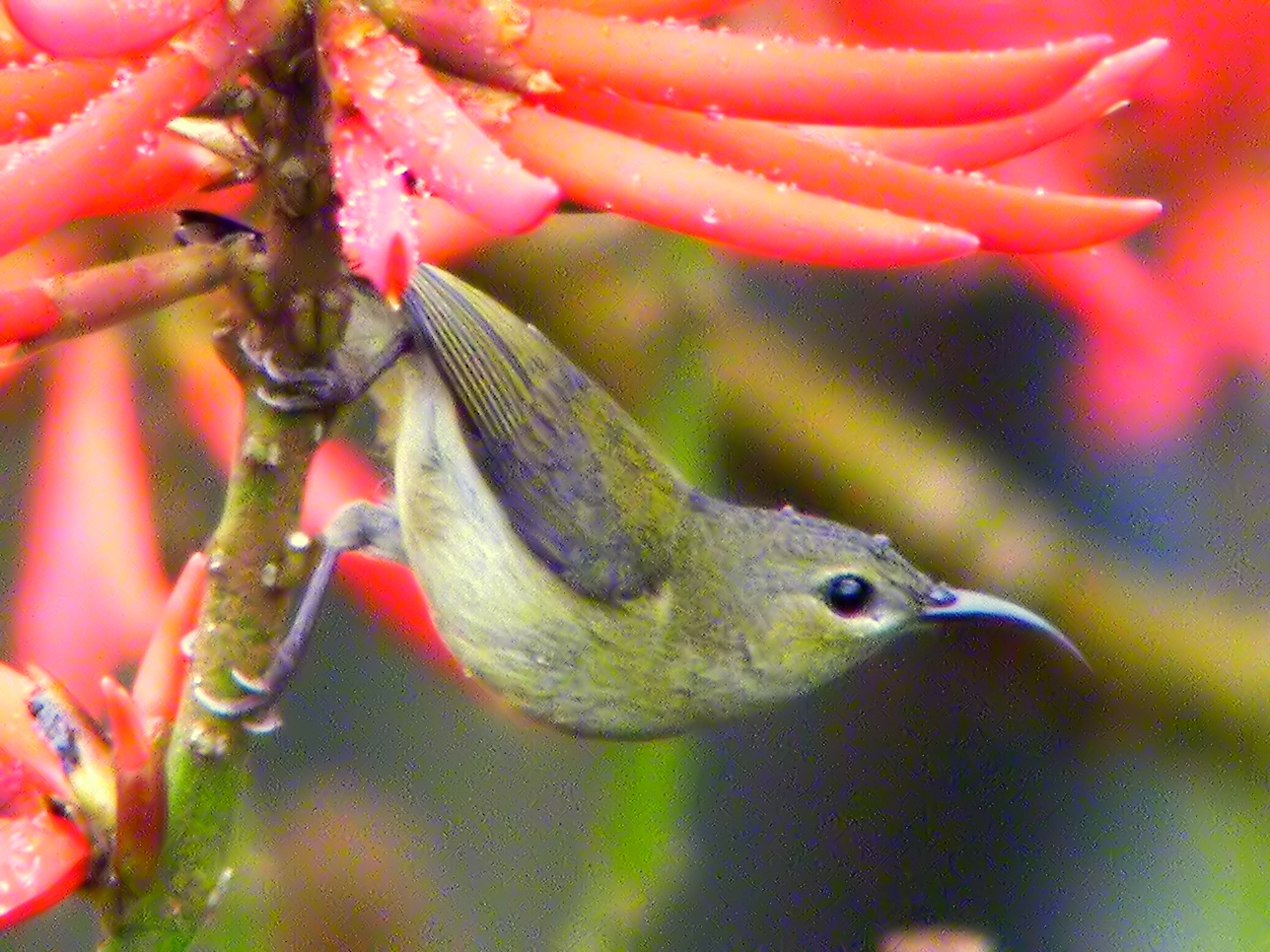
- Female

Conservation status
- Least Concern (IUCN 3.1)

Scientific classification
- Kingdom: Animalia
- Phylum: Chordata
- Class: Aves
- Order: Passeriformes
- Family: Nectariniidae
- Genus: Aethopyga
- Species: A. christinae

Binomial name
- Aethopyga christinae R. Swinhoe, 1869

= Fork-tailed sunbird =

Species of bird

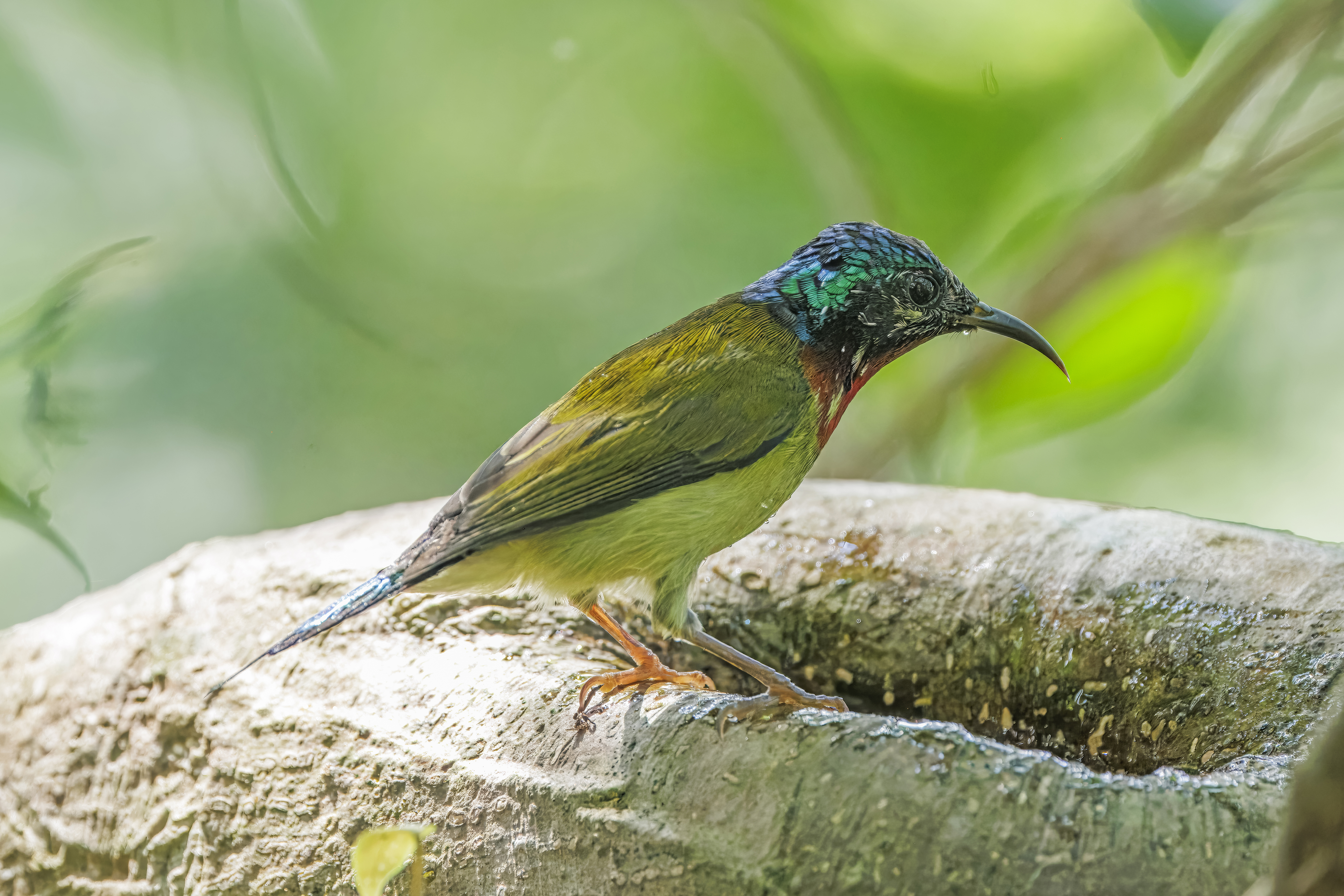

The fork-tailed sunbird (Aethopyga christinae) is a bird in the family Nectariniidae. The species was first described by Robert Swinhoe in 1869.

It is found in China, Hong Kong, Laos, and Vietnam.

Its natural habitat is subtropical or tropical moist lowland forests. These small birds, with decurved bill, call a soft and frequent "zwink-zwink" and a metallic trill. The bird appears in the most commonly used postal stamp of Hong Kong.
