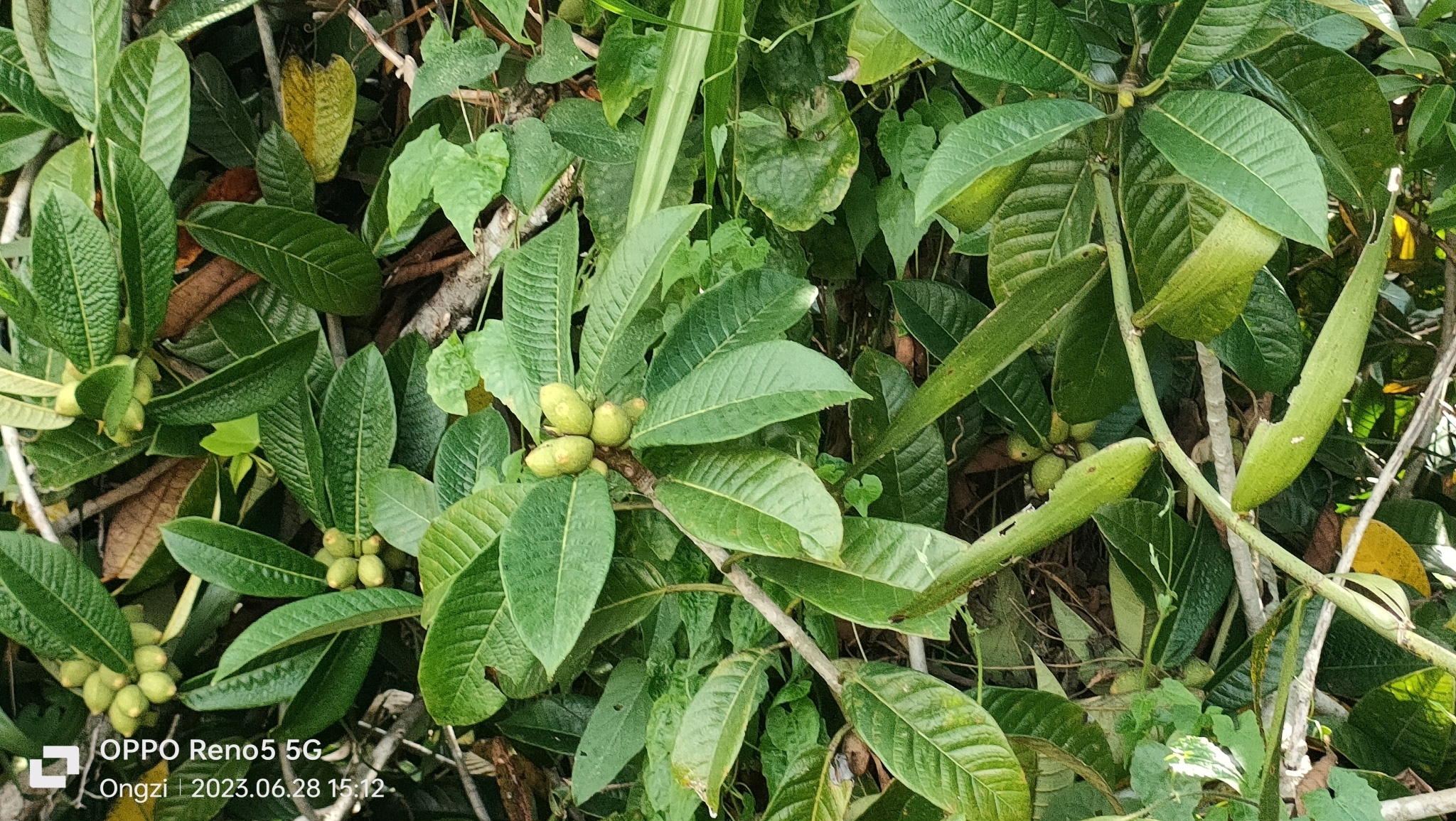
- Foliage and syconia

Conservation status
- Least Concern (IUCN 3.1)

Scientific classification
- Kingdom: Plantae
- Clade: Tracheophytes
- Clade: Angiosperms
- Clade: Eudicots
- Clade: Rosids
- Order: Rosales
- Family: Moraceae
- Genus: Ficus
- Species: F. annulata

Binomial name
- Ficus annulata Blume

Synonyms
- List: Ficus annulata var. biverrucella (Miq.) Miq.; Ficus annulata var. elliptica Miq.; Ficus annulata var. flavescens (Blume) King; Ficus annulata var. valida (Blume) King; Ficus balabacensis Quisumb.; Ficus flavescens Blume; Ficus valida Blume; Urostigma annulatum (Blume) Miq.; Urostigma biverrucellum Miq.; Urostigma conocarpum Miq.; Urostigma depressum Miq.; Urostigma flavescens (Blume) Miq.; Urostigma validum (Blume) Miq.

= Ficus annulata =

Ringed fig

Species of plant

Ficus annulata, the ringed fig, is a species of flowering plant in the family Moraceae. It is native to southern Yunnan, Southeast Asia including the Andaman Islands, and most of Malesia. An initially epiphytic tree reaching 35 m (115 ft), it is found in the wet tropics at elevations up to 1,000 m (3,300 ft). It is occasionally cultivated for its high-quality rubber, and its figs are edible and are consumed by local peoples. Found in a variety of forest habitats, it has been assessed as Least Concern.
