= Dan Sai district =

Dan Sai ด่านซ้าย
- District
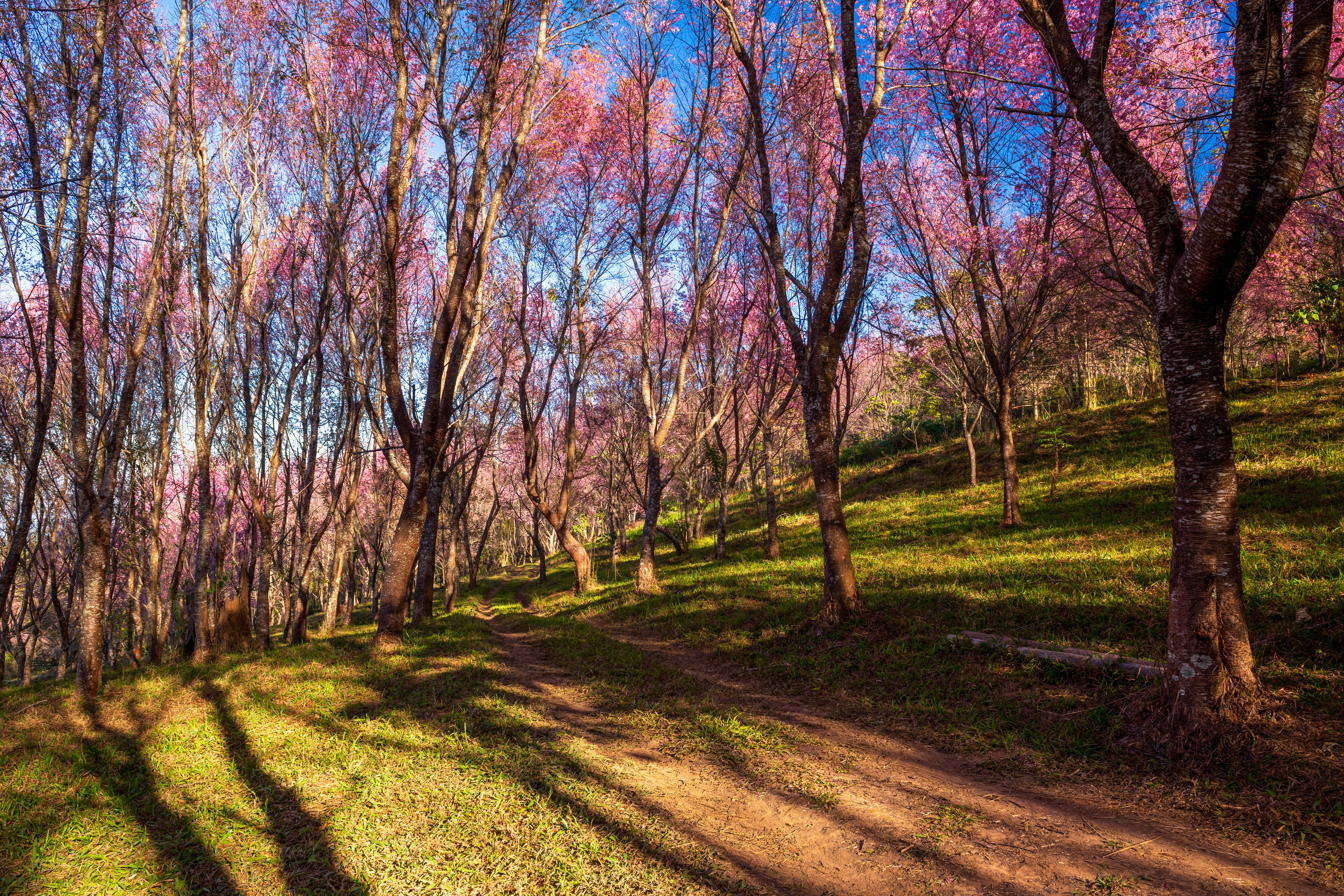
- Phu Lom Lo, part of Phu Hin Rong Kla National Park, the largest wild Himalayan cherry site in Thailand.

- District location in Loei province
- Coordinates: 17°16′48″N 101°8′48″E
- Country: Thailand
- Province: Loei
- Seat: Dan Sai
- Subdistricts: 10
- Mubans: 99

Area
  - Total: 1,732.0 km^{2} (668.7 sq mi)

Population (2015)
  - Total: 51,564
  - Density: 28.4/km^{2} (74/sq mi)
- Time zone: UTC+7 (ICT)
- Postal code: 42120
- Geocode: 4205

Dan Sai (Thai: ด่านซ้าย; IPA: [dàːn sáːj]) is a district (amphoe) in the western part of Loei province, in northeastern Thailand.

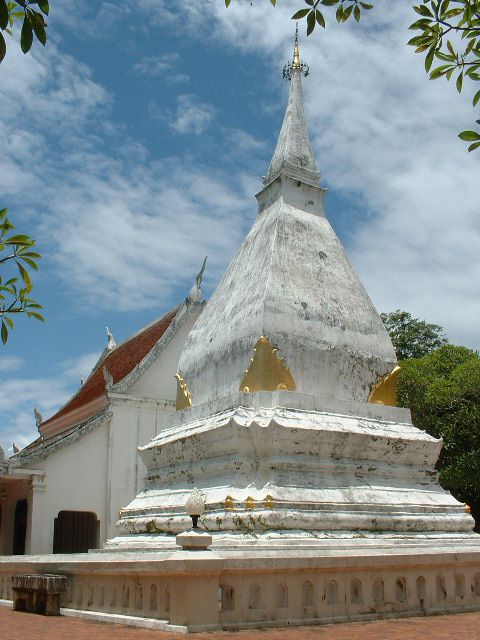
Phra That Si Song Rak

== Geography ==
Neighboring districts are (from the east clockwise): Phu Ruea of Loei Province; Lom Kao and Khao Kho of Phetchabun province; Nakhon Thai of Phitsanulok province; and Na Haeo of Loei. To the north is Xaignabouli province of Laos.

The source of the Pa Sak River is in the mountains in the eastern part of the district. A large part of the district is a portion of the Phu Hin Rong Kla National Park. Phu Thap Buek, the highest mountain of the Phetchabun Range, is at the southern end of the district. To the southeast is the Phu Luang Wildlife Sanctuary.

The northern part of the district reaches the southern end of the Luang Prabang Range mountain area of the Thai highlands.

== History ==
According to General Apirat Kongsompong, on 5 November 1976, King Rama X, then an army captain and crown prince, engaged with communist insurgents in Ban Mak Kheng of Dan Sai District. The general noted that, "His Majesty was in the operation base, ate and slept like other soldiers. His Majesty visited local residents, gave moral support and fought shoulder by shoulder with brave soldiers."

== Administration ==
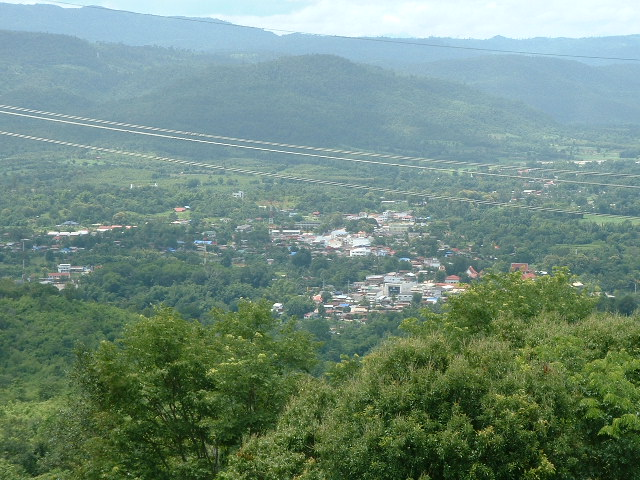
Dan Sai town

=== Central administration ===
Dan Sai is divided into 10 sub-districts (tambons), which are further subdivided into 99 administrative villages (mubans).

No.	Name	Thai	Villages	Pop.
1.	Dan Sai	ด่านซ้าย	15	9,490
2.	Pak Man	ปากหมัน	7	3,034
3.	Na Di	นาดี	9	3,810
4.	Khok Ngam	โคกงาม	7	4,854
5.	Phon Sung	โพนสูง	9	5,026
6.	Ipum	อิปุ่ม	13	4,723
7.	Kok Sathon	กกสะทอน	12	7,854
8.	Pong	โป่ง	11	6,092
9.	Wang Yao	วังยาว	7	3,686
10.	Na Ho	นาหอ	9	2,995

=== Local administration ===
There are two sub-district municipalities (thesaban tambons) in the district:

- Dan Sai (Thai: เทศบาลตำบลด่านซ้าย) consisting of parts of sub-district Dan Sai.
- Si Song Rak (Thai: เทศบาลตำบลศรีสองรัก) consisting of parts of sub-district Dan Sai.

There are nine sub-district administrative organizations (SAO) in the district:

- Pak Man (Thai: องค์การบริหารส่วนตำบลปากหมัน) consisting of sub-district Pak Man.
- Na Di (Thai: องค์การบริหารส่วนตำบลนาดี) consisting of sub-district Na Di.
- Khok Ngam (Thai: องค์การบริหารส่วนตำบลโคกงาม) consisting of sub-district Khok Ngam.
- Phon Sung (Thai: องค์การบริหารส่วนตำบลโพนสูง) consisting of sub-district Phon Sung.
- Ipum (Thai: องค์การบริหารส่วนตำบลอิปุ่ม) consisting of sub-district Ipum.
- Kok Sathon (Thai: องค์การบริหารส่วนตำบลกกสะทอน) consisting of sub-district Kok Sathon.
- Pong (Thai: องค์การบริหารส่วนตำบลโป่ง) consisting of sub-district Pong.
- Wang Yao (Thai: องค์การบริหารส่วนตำบลวังยาว) consisting of sub-district Wang Yao.
- Na Ho (Thai: องค์การบริหารส่วนตำบลนาหอ) consisting of sub-district Na Ho.

== Local festivals ==
Dan Sai is the place where Phi Ta Khon traditions are known around the world. The Thai spirit masked festival is held annually after the full moon of the sixth Thai lunar month (around late June to early July).
