= Phetchabun (disambiguation) =

Phetchabun may refer to these places in Thailand:

- the town Phetchabun
- Phetchabun Province
- Mueang Phetchabun district
- Monthon Phetchabun, a former administrative entity
- Phetchabun mountain range
