= Phu Thap Boek =

Mountain in Thailand

- ภูทับเบิก
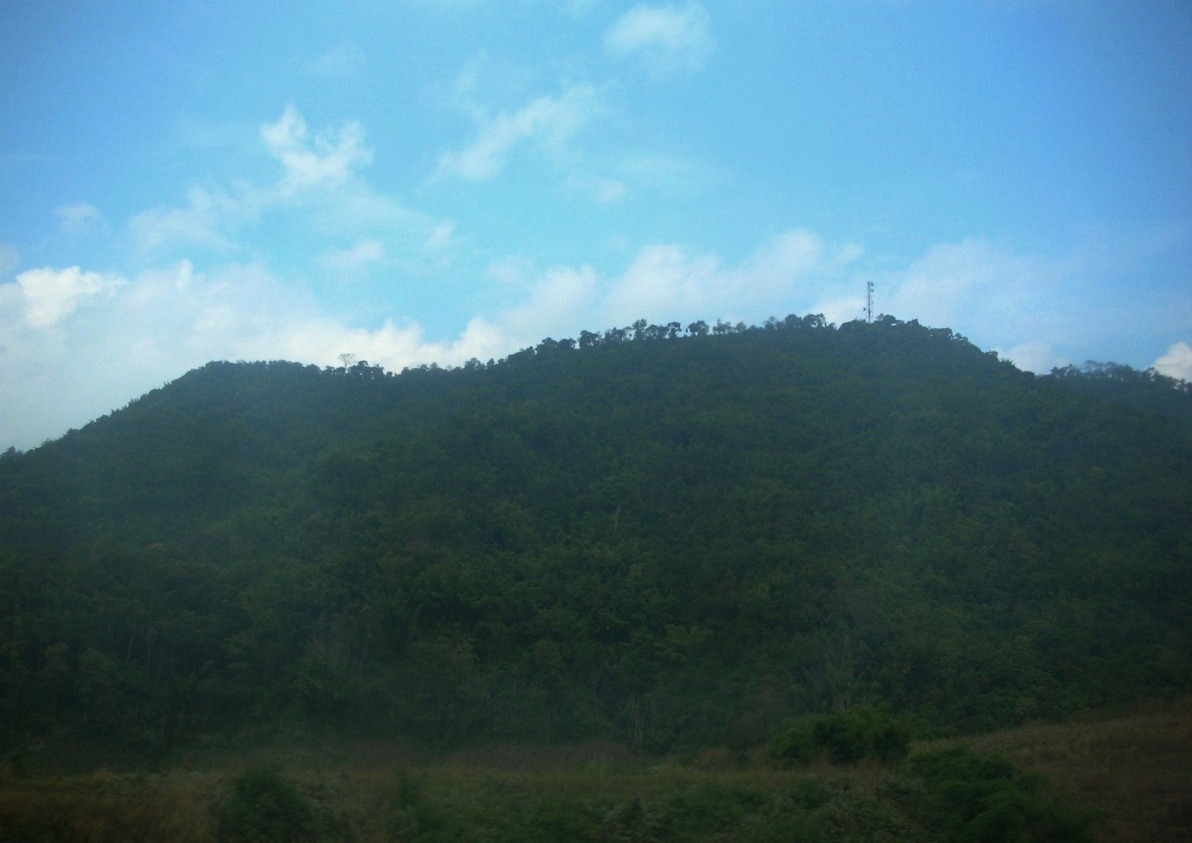
- Phu Thap Boek, east side from Route 203

Highest point
- Elevation: 1,794 m (5,886 ft)
- Prominence: 1,285 m (4,216 ft)
- Listing: Ribu; List of mountains in Thailand
- Coordinates: 16°54′23″N 101°5′14″E

Geography
- Location within Thailand
- Location: Phetchabun and Loei provinces, Thailand
- Parent range: Phetchabun Mountains

Geology
- Mountain type: Sandstone

Phu Thap Boek (Thai: ภูทับเบิก) is a 1,794 m high mountain in Phetchabun Province, Thailand near the border with Loei Province. It is in the Lom Kao District.

== Description ==
Rising in the western range of the massif this mountain is the highest point of the Phetchabun Mountains. The peak rises 12 km west of Highway 203, between the towns of Loei and Phetchabun.

Phu Hin Rong Kla National Park surrounds the mountain. The park overlaps the borders of two provinces, Phitsanulok and Phetchabun. Most of the mountain is covered in mixed evergreen forest. There are farms on its slopes where the climate favors cabbage cultivation. The area around the mountain is part of the Luang Prabang montane rain forest ecoregion.

The villagers of Phu Thap Boek are predominantly Hmong hill tribespeople who immigrated from northern Thailand. They established the Phetchabun Hilltribe Development and Relief Center in 1982. The mountain has since been overrun by allegedly illegal resorts and restaurants.

== Geography ==
The summit of Phu Thap Boek is at 1,768 meters elevation. Geological uplifts changed the area of Phetchabun Province from a flat plate to sandstone mountains. The east and south are Lom Sak District and Khao Kho District. The north and west are adjacent to Loei Province.

== Climate ==
December and January are the coldest months, April the hottest. Summer temperatures average about 20 degrees Celsius. May through September are the wettest months, peaking in September.

== See also ==
- List of mountains in Thailand
