= Phu Kradueng National Park =

National park of Thailand

- อุทยานแห่งชาติภูกระดึง
- IUCN category II (national park)
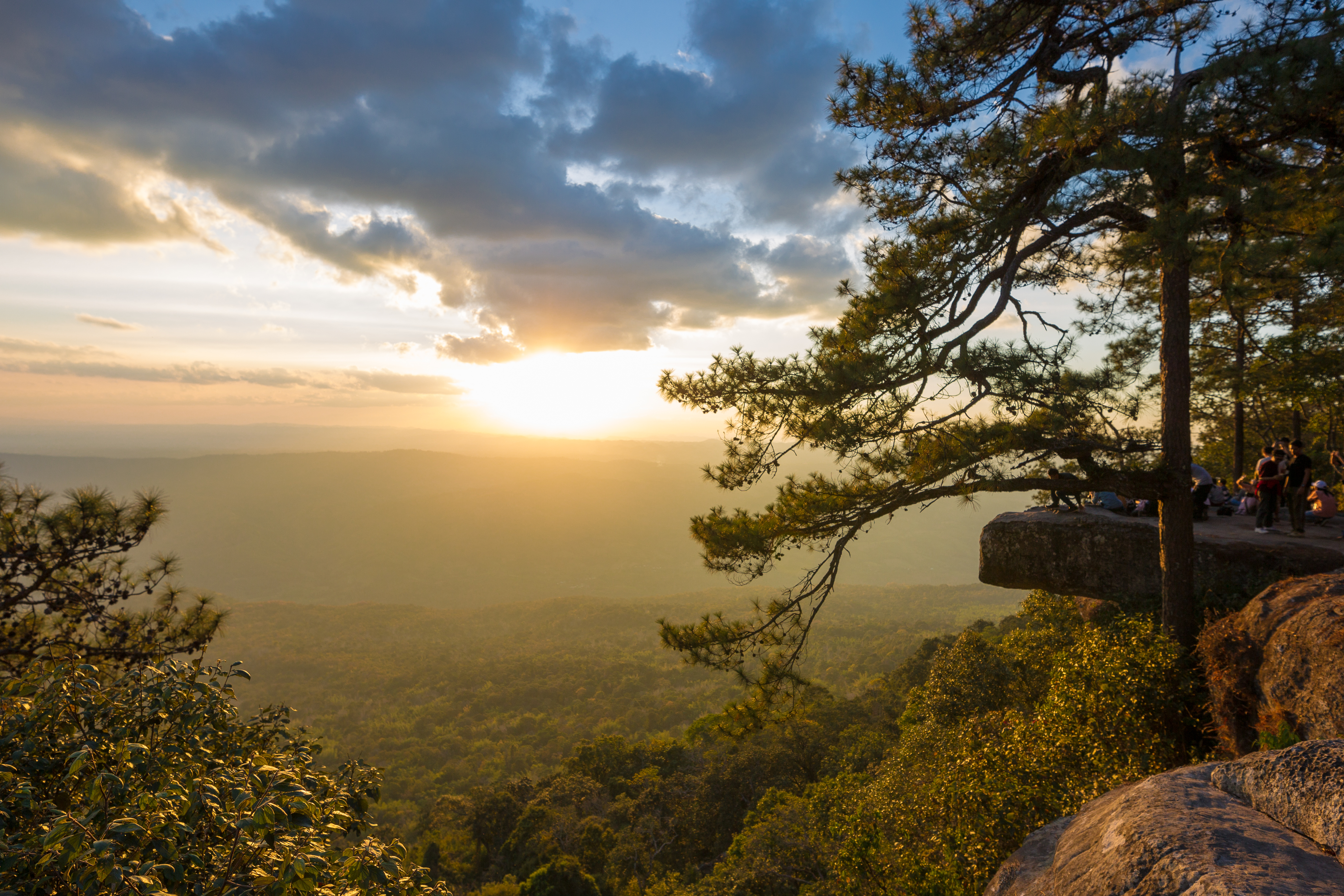
- View from Lom Sak Cliff on Phu Kradueng Mountain

- Location within Thailand
- Location: Loei Province, Thailand
- Nearest city: Loei
- Coordinates: 16°52′05″N 101°46′33″E
- Area: 348 km^{2} (134 sq mi)
- Established: 1962
- Visitors: 86,259 (in 2019)
- Governing body: Department of National Parks, Wildlife and Plant Conservation

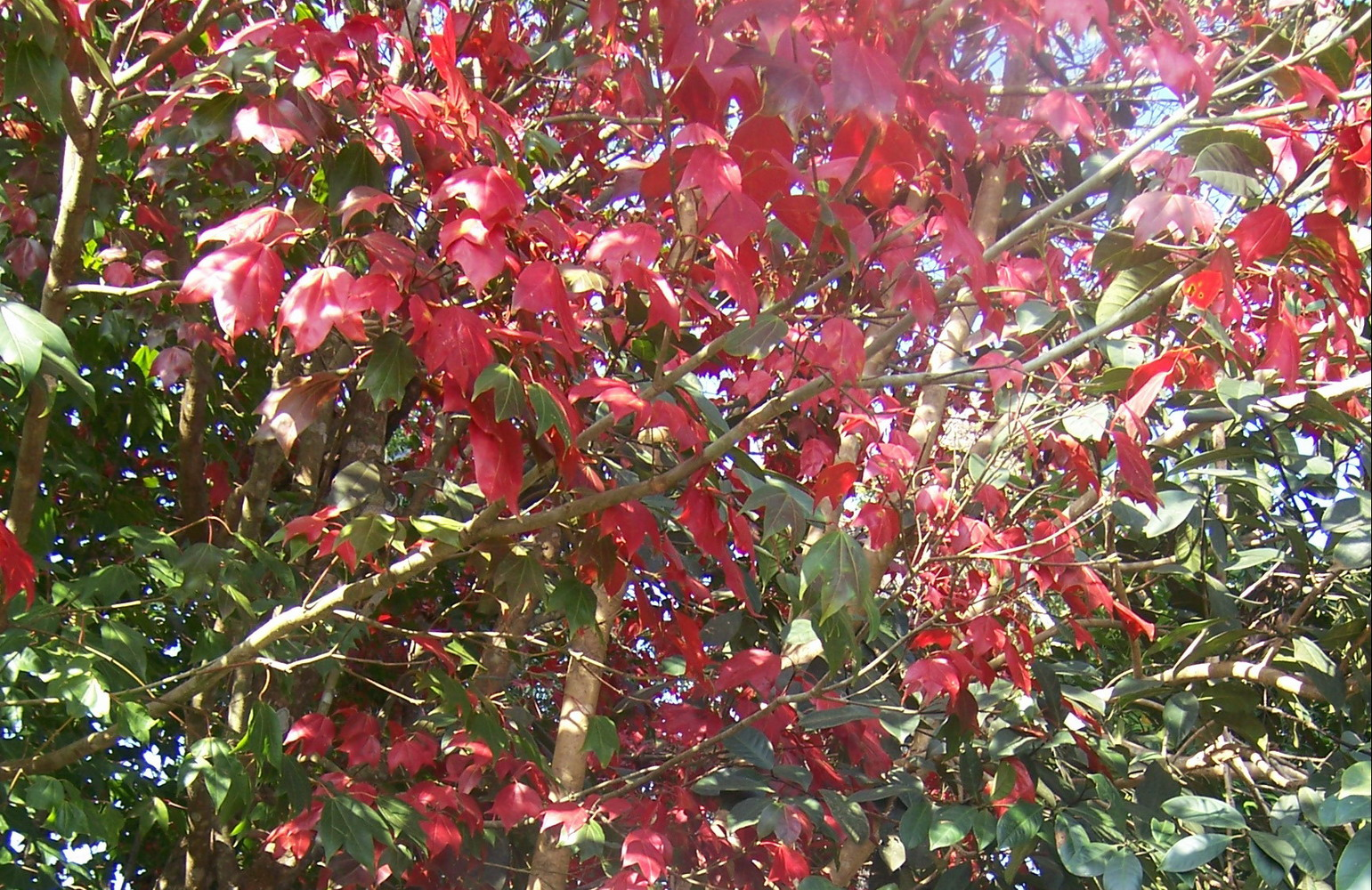
Acer calcaratum leaves in Phu Kradueng

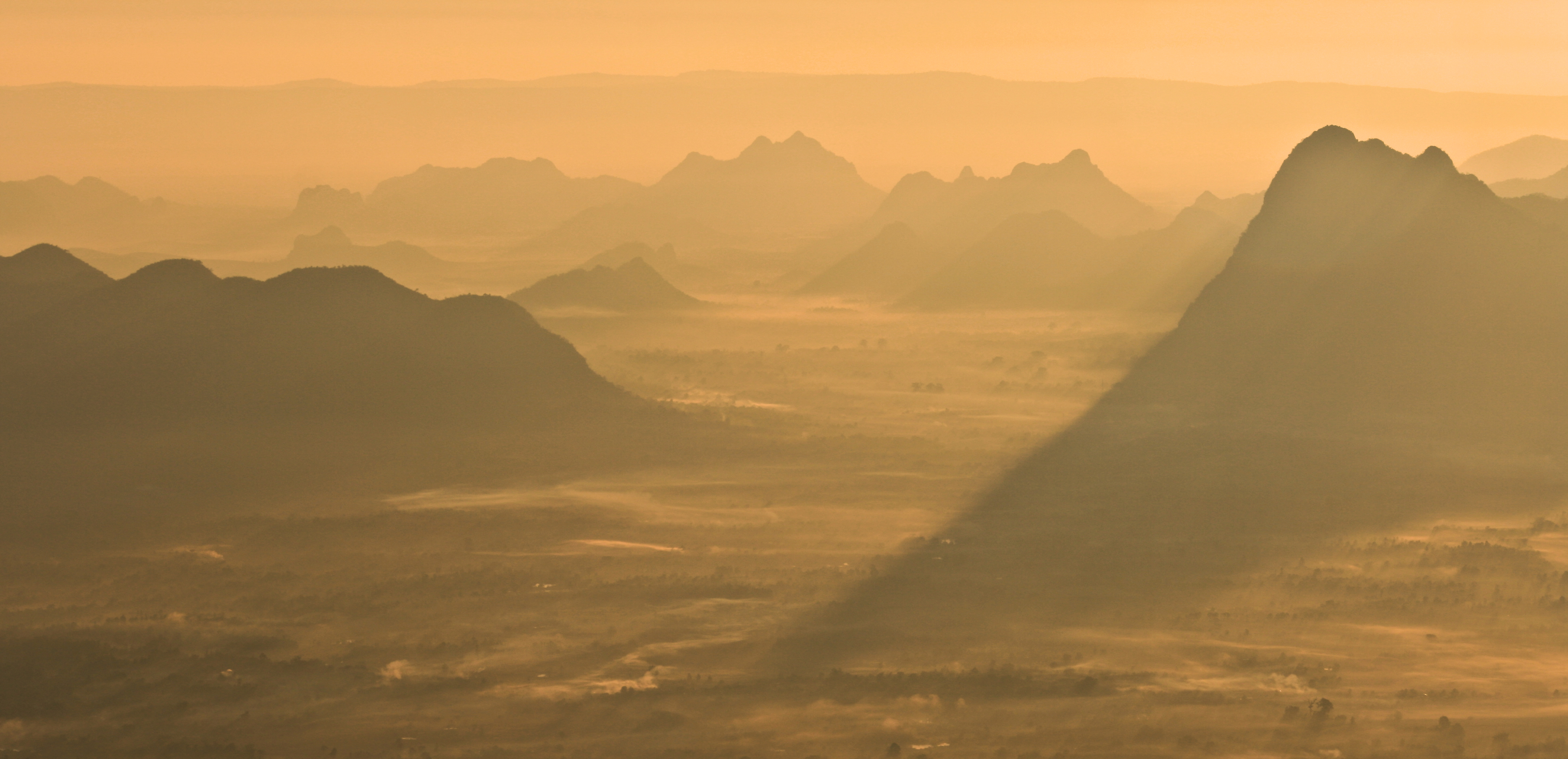
Sunrise view from the mountain

Phu Kradueng National Park (Thai: อุทยานแห่งชาติภูกระดึง), in the Si Than sub-district of Amphoe Phu Kradueng, Loei Province, is a national park in Thailand. It has a high point of 1,316 m (4318 ft) elevation at Khok Moei. It was proclaimed a national park on 23 November 1962, making it the second national park of Thailand after Khao Yai National Park.

The park is closed to visitors during the rainy season (1 June - 30 September).

== Toponymy ==
"Phu" (ภู) comes from the Thai-Isan word "phukao" (ภูเขา), meaning mountain. The name "kradueng" (กระดึง), or "krading" (กระดิ่ง) in the local dialect of Loei Province, can be translated as "rakhang yai" (ระฆังใหญ่), meaning "large bell". This name comes from a legend relating to a Buddhist holiday. During the holiday many of the townspeople heard the sound of a large bell. They believed it to be the bell of Indra.

== Geography ==
Phu Kradueng mountain, made up of Jurassic and Cretaceous sandstone formations, takes the form of a mesa towering some 1,000 meters above the surrounding valleys. The summit plateau is roughly square-shaped and 60 km^{2} (37,500 rai) in size, with an average elevation of about 1,250 meters. Sloping slightly to the north, its western, southern, and eastern edges are fairly straight and formed by abrupt sandstone cliffs, while the northern part is deformed in a more irregular shape, containing a number of streams and (seasonal) waterfalls. The summit itself, in the southwestern part of the plateau, is inconspicuous. The park occupies an area of 217,576 rai ~ 348 square kilometres (134 sq mi)

== History ==
Legend has it that a hunter tried to hunt a bull that fled to the top of a mountain in Srithan sub-district. (Currently in Phu Kradueng district). This mountain has never been seen before. When the hunter followed the bull to the top of that mountain, he found that the area on that mountain was filled with beautiful vast plains, pine forests, plants and various kinds of wildlife.

Prince Prachaksinlapakhom went to the area and made a geographical report, which was presented to the Ministry of Interior. In 1943 the government issued a decree of the National Forest. The Royal Forest Department therefore started a survey to establish a national park in Phu Kradueng, Loei Province for the first time, but due to the shortage of budget and officials, little went and stopped.

On October 7, 1959, the Cabinet passed a resolution to designate 14 forests in various provinces as a national park in order to permanently conserve natural resources for the common benefit. The Forest Department has proposed the establishment of Phu Kradueng forest to be a national park in accordance with Section 6 of the National Park Act 1961 by a royal decree to determine Phu Kradueng forest in the district of Si Than. Phu Kradueng Subdistrict Wang Saphung District Loei Province is a national park.

On July 6, 1977, the Cabinet passed a resolution to revoke the national park area in the area that the Air Force requests to use as a telecommunication relay station for the benefit of the government. The military has an area of approximately 5 rai, the Royal Forestry Department, therefore, requested the revocation of the land area in 1978.

== Terrain ==
Phu Kradueng is a sandstone mountain peak cut, located in the northwest of the Khorat Plateau, near the east slope of the Phetchabun mountain range. Most of the mountain's areas are 400–1,200 meters above sea level. The base or foothills start from the lowest point of the area at an altitude of 260 meters to an altitude of 400 meters. Phu Kradueng. The flat area on the top of the mountain is approximately 60 square kilometers (37,500 rai), resembling a bonfire or heart shape when viewed from above, with the tip of the leaf in the southeast and the inner part in the northeast. The flat area on the hill consists of low hills. The highest peak is at Khok Moei, approximately 1,316 meters above sea level.

== Climate ==
Phu Kradueng is a cool and comfortable all year round. The average temperature is 15 °C. In the cool season, temperatures on the coldest nights reach freezing. In the rainy season, the weather can change quickly. Fog and low clouds tend to hang low over the landscape. Cliffs may collapse under their own weight after the soil which underlies the sandstone cap is eroded by heavy rain. Heavy rains can also cause flash floods in the streams which run down the mountain. Thus, the park is closed between June and September every year for visitor safety and forest rejuvenation.

== Flora and fauna ==
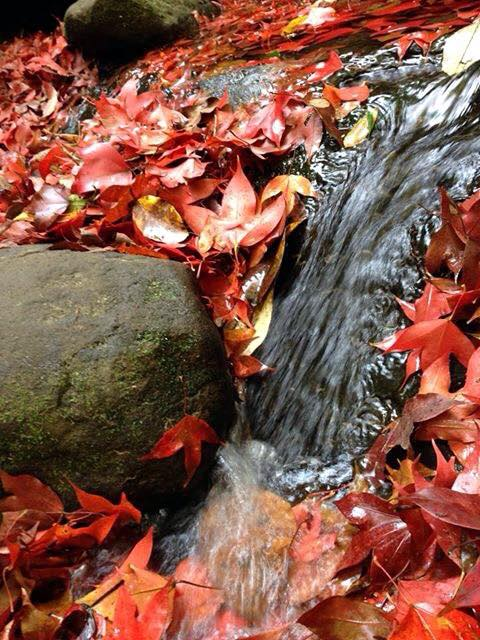
Red maple leaves during the winter season

The mountain's steep sides are home to a succession of tropical forest tiers, namely (in ascending order): deciduous dipterocarp, mixed deciduous, dry evergreen, and hill evergreen forests, interspersed with bamboo. In contrast to that, the plateau at the mountain top consists of a sandy pine savanna landscape. Dominant tree species are Siamese sal (Shorea obtusa), Shorea siamensis, Diospyros spp., Lagerstroemia spp., Podocarpus neriifolius, maple, Pinus latteri, and Pinus kesiya. The grass fields support a variety of flowers, such as Hydrocera triflora, Torenia fournieri and marigolds. These flowers bloom at different times of the year. Some grow well in the rocky fields including Dendrobium sp. Close to the ground are ferns, mosses, and Serissa sp. Lady's slipper orchids such as Paphiopedilum grow on trees.

Phu Kradueng, with its variety of forest types and vegetation, provides abundant food for wildlife community, including elephants, bears, sambar deer, barking deer, serow, squirrels, foxes, white-handed gibbons and crab-eating macaques. Birds include white-rumped shama, black eagle, silver pheasant, red-wattled lapwing, Chinese francolin, minivet, rufous-bellied eagle, Nepal house-martin, bush robin, Mugimaki flycatcher and slaty-backed flycatcher. There is one rare species of turtle called "Tao Poo Loo" or "Tao Hang" which has a long tail and lives in high elevations along streams in the forests. A common and widespread butterfly is blue pansy.

== Location ==
Phu Kradueng National Park in overview PARO 8 (Khon Kaen)

2) Phu Kradueng National Park in overview PARO 8 (Khon Kaen)

	National park
1	Nam Phong
2	Phu Kradueng
3	Phu Pha Man
4	Phu Ruea
5	Phu Suan Sai
6	Phu Wiang
	Wildlife sanctuary
7	Phu Kho–Phu Kratae
8	Phu Luang

	Non-hunting area
9	Dun Lamphan
10	Lam Pao
11	Tham Pha Nam Thip

	Forest park
12	Chi Long
13	Harirak
14	Kosamphi
15	Namtok Ba Luang
16	Namtok Huai Lao
17	Pha Ngam
18	Phu Bo Bit
19	Phu Faek
20	Phu Han–Phu Ra-Ngam
21	Phu Pha Lom
22	Phu Pha Wua
23	Phu Phra
24	Tham Saeng–Tham Phrommawat

== See also ==
- List of national parks of Thailand
- List of Protected Areas Regional Offices of Thailand
