= Phu Ruea district =

Phu Ruea ภูเรือ
- District
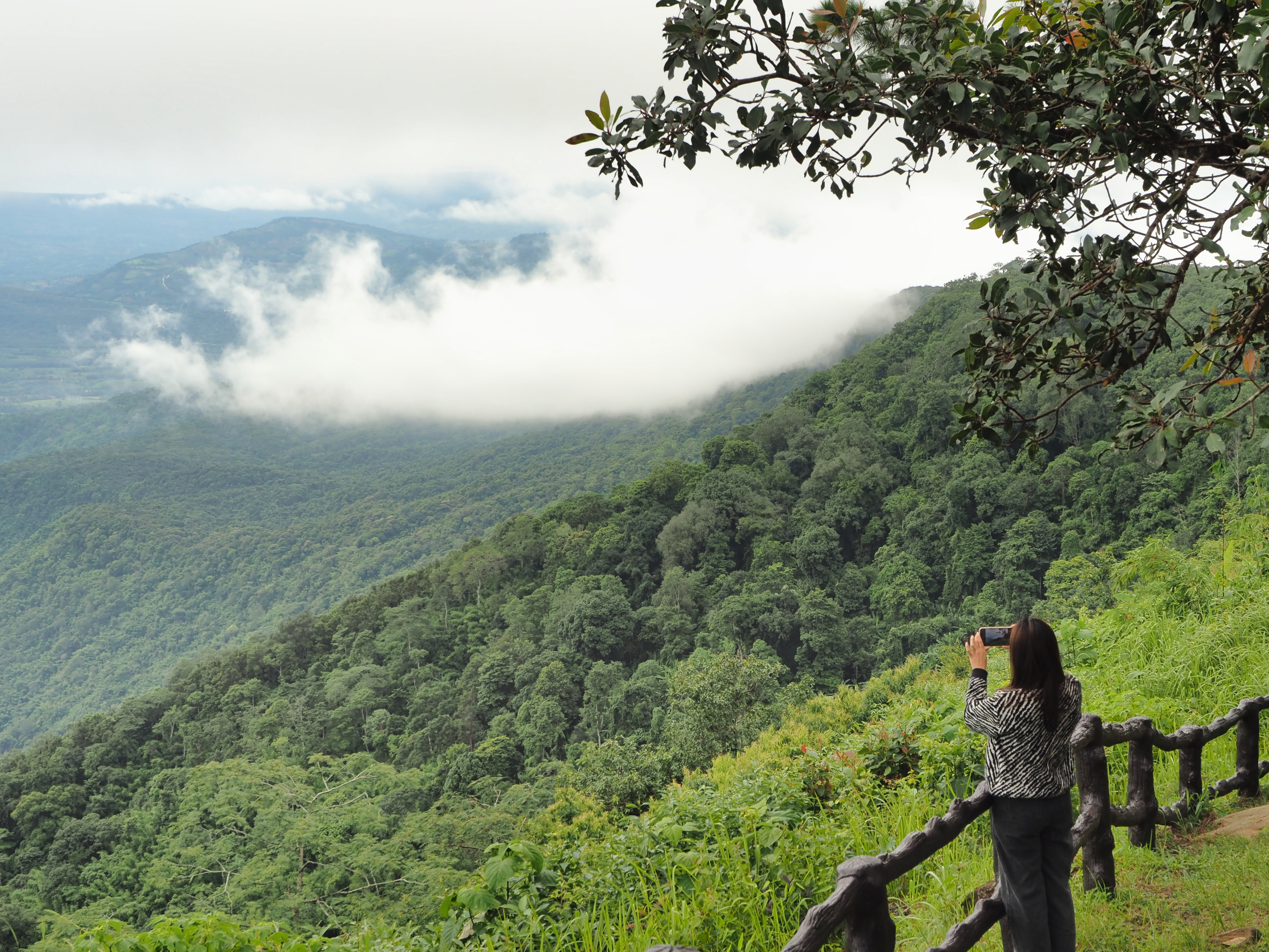
- Viewpoint of Phu Ruea National Park

- District location in Loei province
- Coordinates: 17°27′18″N 101°21′48″E
- Country: Thailand
- Province: Loei
- Seat: Nong Bua
- District established: 1968

Area
  - Total: 880.0 km^{2} (339.8 sq mi)

Population (2009)
  - Total: 21,182
  - Density: 23.5/km^{2} (61/sq mi)
- Time zone: UTC+7 (ICT)
- Postal code: 42160
- Geocode: 4207

Phu Ruea (Thai: ภูเรือ, pronounced [pʰūː rɯ̄a̯]) is a district (amphoe) in the western part of Loei province, in northeastern Thailand.

== History ==
The government split off some parts of Tha Li, Mueang Loei, and Dan Sai Districts and made them into the minor district (king amphoe) Phu Ruea on 15 October 1968 and made it a subordinate of Dan Sai. It was upgraded to a full district on 1 April 1974.

== Geography ==
The district is named after Phu Ruea, an important mountain in the area.

Neighboring districts are (from the northeast clockwise): Tha Li, Mueang Loei, Wang Saphung, Phu Luang of Loei Province; Lom Kao of Phetchabun province; and Dan Sai of Loei. To the northwest is Xaignabouli province of Laos.

To the north of the district is the Phu Ruea National Park, to the south the Phu Luang Wildlife Sanctuary.

The northwestern part of the district reaches the southern end of the Luang Prabang Range mountain area of the Thai highlands.

== Administration ==
The district is divided into six sub-districts (tambons), which are further subdivided into 47 villages (mubans). Phu Ruea is a sub-district municipality (thesaban tambon) which covers parts of tambon Nong Bua. There are further six tambon administrative organizations (TAO).

No.	Name	Thai	Villages	Pop.
1.	Nong Bua	หนองบัว	8	5,509
2.	Tha Sala	ท่าศาลา	7	2,746
3.	Rong Chik	ร่องจิก	10	4,842
4.	Pla Ba	ปลาบ่า	7	3,226
5.	Lat Khang	ลาดค่าง	6	2,078
6.	San Tom	สานตม	9	2,781
