= PPS.Phetchabun City F.C. =

Thai football club

PPS.Phetchabun City พีพีเอส เพชรบูรณ์ ซิตี้
- Full name: PPS.Phetchabun City Football Club สโมสรฟุตบอลพีพีเอส เพชรบูรณ์ ซิตี้
- Founded: 2016; 9 years ago
- Ground: ? Phetchabun, Thailand
- League: 2018 Thailand Amateur League Northern Region

PPS.Phetchabun City Football Club (Thai สโมสรฟุตบอลพีพีเอส เพชรบูรณ์ ซิตี้), is a Thai football club based in Bangkok, Thailand. The club is currently playing in the 2018 Thailand Amateur League Northern Region.

== Record ==
Season	League									FA Cup	League Cup	Top goalscorer	
Season	Division	P	W	D	L	F	A	Pts	Pos	FA Cup	League Cup	Name	Goals
2017	TA North	1	0	0	1	1	2	0	13th – 21st	Not Enter	Can't Enter		
2018	TA North	1	0	0	1	1	2	0	19th	Not Enter	Can't Enter	Piyanat Kaewkok	1

Champions	Runners-up	Promoted	Relegated
