= Phu Ruea National Park =

National park in Thailand

- อุทยานแห่งชาติภูเรือ
- IUCN category II (national park)
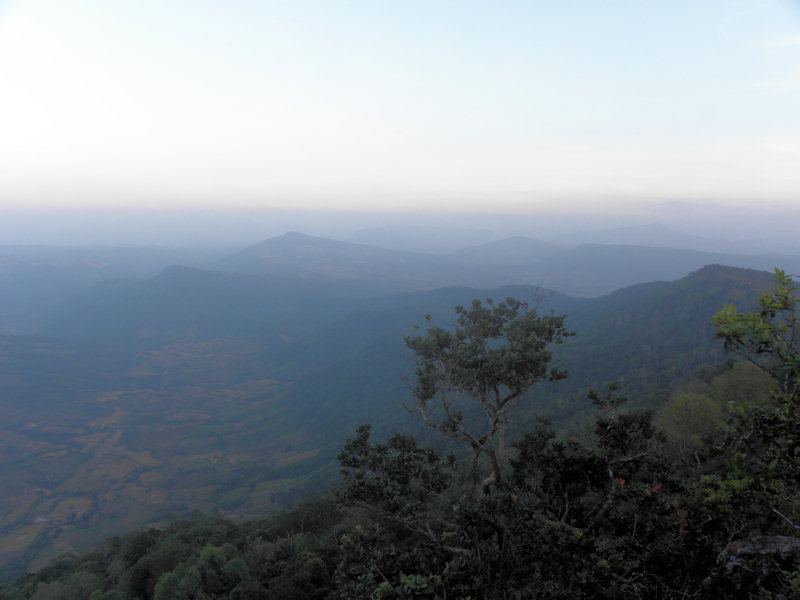
- View from Phu Ruea peak
- Interactive map of Phu Ruea National Park
- Location: Loei Province, Thailand
- Nearest city: Loei
- Coordinates: 17°30′53″N 101°20′41″E
- Area: 121 km^{2} (47 sq mi)
- Established: 26 July 1979
- Visitors: 169,643 (in 2019)
- Governing body: Department of National Park, Wildlife and Plant Conservation (DNP)

Phu Ruea National Park (Thai: อุทยานแห่งชาติภูเรือ) is a national park in Loei Province, Thailand. The park is centred on Phu Ruea mountain, a popular, scenic peak in the Phetchabun Mountains. The park was established on 26 July 1979.

== Geography ==
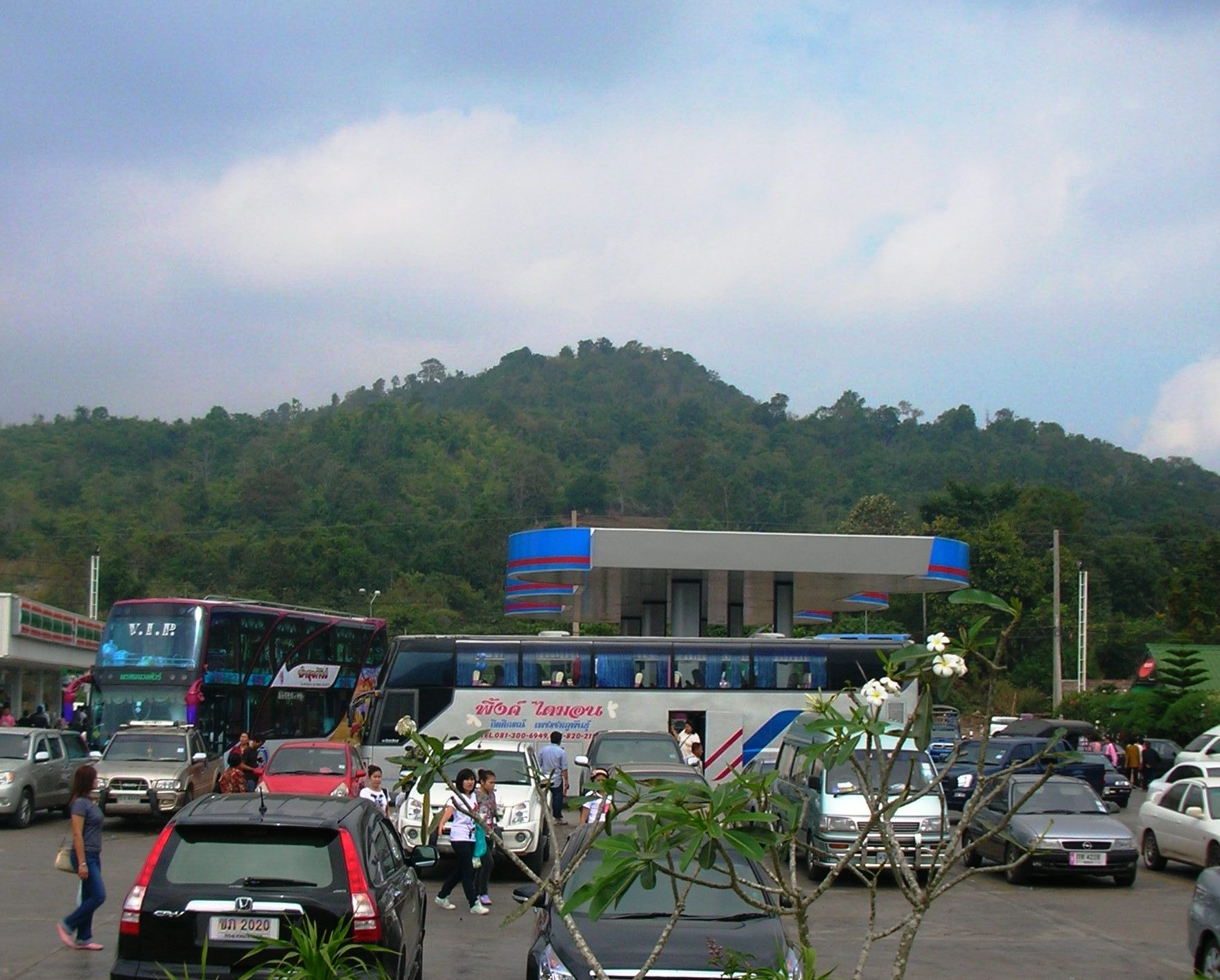
South side of Phu Ruea

Phu Ruea National Park is 52 kilometres (32 mi) west of Loei town in Nong Bua Sub-district, Phu Ruea District and also Tha Li District. The park's area is 75,525 rai ~ 121 square kilometres (47 sq mi).

Phu Ruea mountain is 1,365 metres (4,478 ft) high and experiences some of Thailand's coldest temperatures. In December and January temperatures here can fall below freezing. Phu Ruea means 'boat mountain', a name inspired by the shape of a cliff at the peak.

The peak of Phu Ruea offers views of the Mekong and Hueang Rivers and Laos. The park has numerous waterfalls, the highest of which is the Huai Phai waterfall at 30 metres (100 ft). Pha Sam Thong is a large cliff.

Other peaks within the park include Phusun at 1,035 metres (3,396 ft) and Phuku at 1,000 metres (3,300 ft).

== Flora and fauna ==
Types of forest in the park include mixed deciduous, deciduous dipterocarp, dry evergreen, and coniferous. Plant species include orchids such as Phalaenopsis pulcherrima, Rhynchostylis retusa and various Vanda and Dendrobium species as well as various rhododendron such as Rhododendron simsii and Rhododendron lyi.

Animal species include sun bear, northern red muntjac, sambar deer, dhole, black giant squirrel and Siamese hare. Bird life in the park includes red junglefowl, Siamese fireback, yellow-vented bulbul, greater coucal, plain prinia, coppersmith barbet, Asian barred owlet as well as brown-throated sunbird. The endangered big-headed turtle is present in the park.

== Location ==
Phu Ruea National Park in overview PARO 8 (Khon Kaen)

4) Phu Ruea National Park in overview PARO 8 (Khon Kaen)

	National park
1	Nam Phong
2	Phu Kradueng
3	Phu Pha Man
4	Phu Ruea
5	Phu Suan Sai
6	Phu Wiang
	Wildlife sanctuary
7	Phu Kho–Phu Kratae
8	Phu Luang

	Non-hunting area
9	Dun Lamphan
10	Lam Pao
11	Tham Pha Nam Thip

	Forest park
12	Chi Long
13	Harirak
14	Kosamphi
15	Namtok Ba Luang
16	Namtok Huai Lao
17	Pha Ngam
18	Phu Bo Bit
19	Phu Faek
20	Phu Han–Phu Ra-Ngam
21	Phu Pha Lom
22	Phu Pha Wua
23	Phu Phra
24	Tham Saeng–Tham Phrommawat

== See also ==
- List of national parks of Thailand
- List of Protected Areas Regional Offices of Thailand
