= Khao Kho =

Mountain in Phetchabun province, Thailand

- เขาค้อ
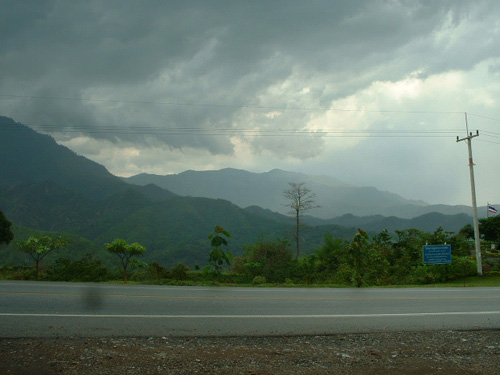
- Khao Kho seen from Thailand Route 12

Highest point
- Elevation: 1,143 m (3,750 ft)
- Listing: List of mountains in Thailand
- Coordinates: 16°36′54″N 100°59′08″E

Geography
- Location within Thailand
- Location: Phetchabun Province, Thailand
- Parent range: Phetchabun Mountains, western range

Climbing
- First ascent: Unknown

Khao Kho (Thai: เขาค้อ), is a 1143 m high mountain in Phetchabun Province, Thailand. It is in Khao Kho District. The mountain is part of the western range of the Phetchabun Mountains.

Khao Kho was named either after the Ceylon oak or after Livistona speciosa, a kind of palm tree. Both species are known as kho (Thai: ค้อ) in Thai and are abundant in the area.

== Summit ==
A road leads to the summit where there is a memorial erected to commemorate the victims of the battles between the Royal Thai Armed Forces and insurgents of the Communist Party of Thailand. Between 1968 and 1981 there was unrest around the mountain where the provinces of Phetchabun and Phitsanulok meet.

== See also ==
- List of mountains in Thailand
