= Nam Phong National Park =

National park of Thailand

- อุทยานแห่งชาติน้ำพอง
- IUCN category II (national park)
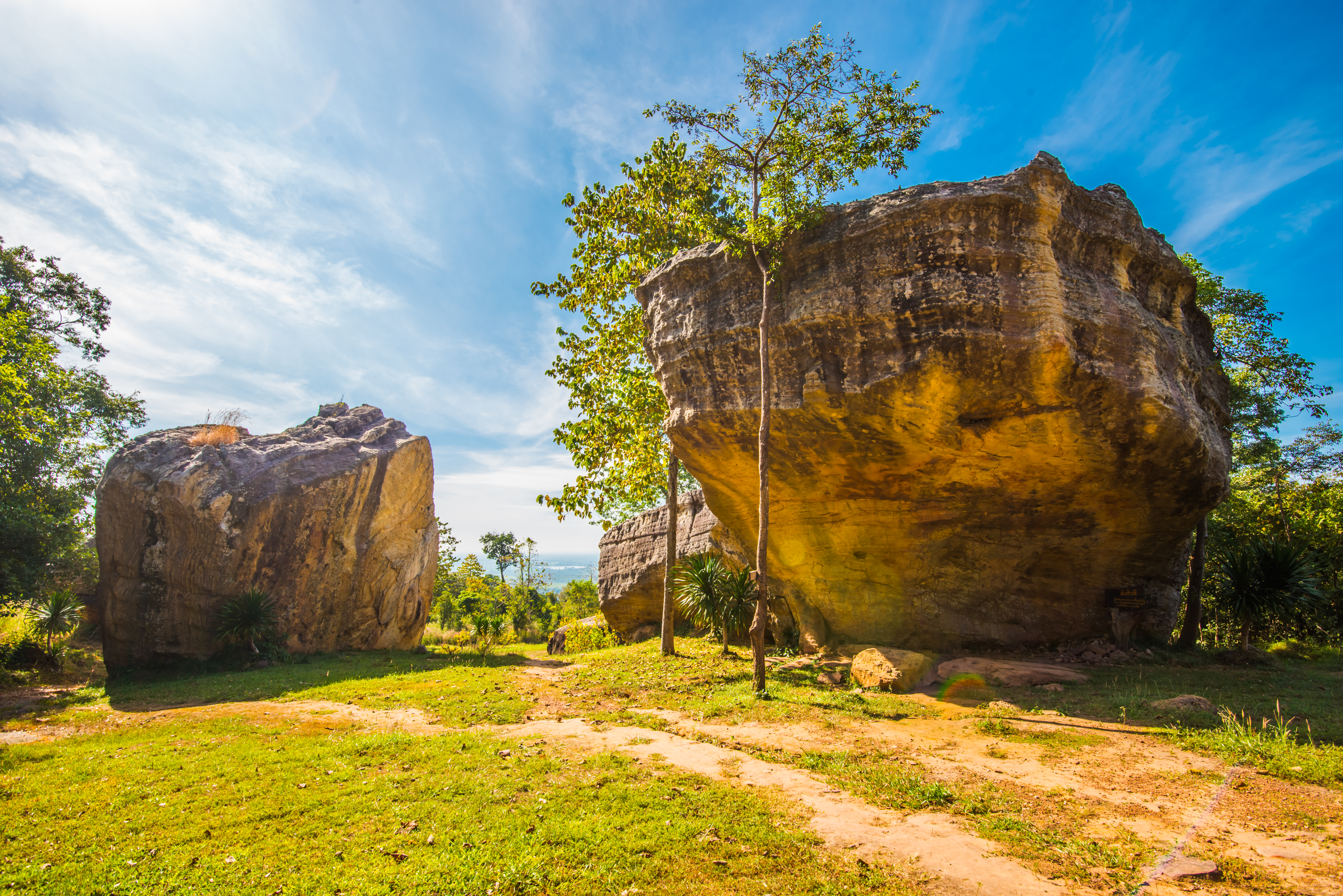
- Hin Chang Si

- Location within Thailand
- Location: Thailand
- Nearest city: Khon Kaen
- Coordinates: 16°37′20″N 102°35′22″E
- Area: 197 km^{2} (76 sq mi)
- Established: 2000
- Visitors: 68,273 (in 2019)
- Governing body: Department of National Parks, Wildlife and Plant Conservation

Nam Phong National Park (Thai: อุทยานแห่งชาติน้ำพอง) is a national park in Thailand's Khon Kaen and Chaiyaphum provinces. This mountainous park, in two separate sections, encompasses part of the Ubol Ratana Dam reservoir and also features rock formations and cliff-top viewpoints. The park is named for the Nam Phong River, impounded by the dam.

== Geography ==
Nam Phong National Park is located about 50 kilometres (30 mi) west of the city of Khon Kaen in the Ubolratana, Ban Fang, Nong Ruea, Mancha Khiri and Khok Pho Chai districts of Khon Kaen Province and the Ban Thaen and Kaeng Khro districts of Chaiyaphum Province. The park's area is 123,125 rai ~ 197 square kilometres (76 sq mi). The park is located in the Phu Phan Kham mountain range in the northern section and the Phu Meng mountain range in the southern section. Rivers such as the Nam Phong, Chi and Choen are fed by sources within the park's boundaries.

== Attractions ==
Part of the Ubol Ratana Dam reservoir is in the park's northern section and is located by the park headquarters. Hin Chang Si viewpoint, also in the park's northern section, offers views over the reservoir, forested landscapes and east to Khon Kaen. There are also prehistoric rock paintings at this location.

There are rock formations at Pha Chan Dai and Kham Phon. There are viewpoints at Pha Sawan and Hin Chang Si. Phu Meng mountain's forests host a wide variety of animal and plant life.

The Huai Khe waterfall is in the park's southern section.

== Flora and fauna ==
The park's main forest type is deciduous dipterocarp, covering 80% of the park's area. The remainder of the park is mixed deciduous forest and grassland.

Tree species include Shorea obtusa, Shorea siamensis, Dipterocarpus obtusifolius, wild almond, Annamese burada, Hopea ferrea and Cycas.

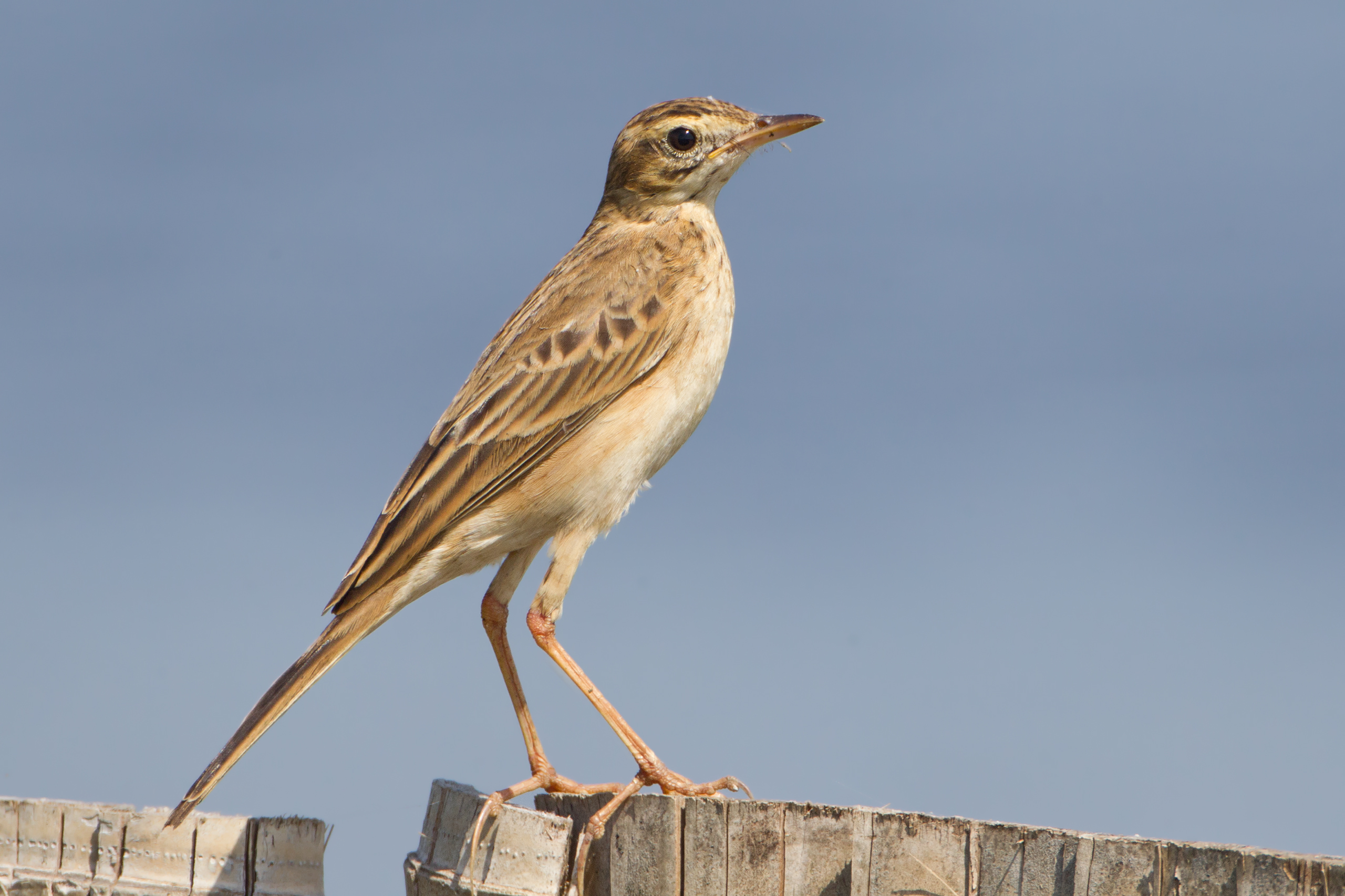
Richard's pipit

The park serves as a sanctuary for animals including wild boar, northern red muntjac (Muntiacus muntjak vaginalis), porcupine, pangolin and Siamese hare. Bird life includes white wagtail, grey wagtail, Richard's pipit, sooty-headed bulbul, kingfisher and munia.

== Location ==
Nam Phong National Park in overview PARO 8 (Khon Kaen)

1) Nam Phong National Park in overview PARO 8 (Khon Kaen)

	National park
1	Nam Phong
2	Phu Kradueng
3	Phu Pha Man
4	Phu Ruea
5	Phu Suan Sai
6	Phu Wiang
	Wildlife sanctuary
7	Phu Kho–Phu Kratae
8	Phu Luang

	Non-hunting area
9	Dun Lamphan
10	Lam Pao
11	Tham Pha Nam Thip

	Forest park
12	Chi Long
13	Harirak
14	Kosamphi
15	Namtok Ba Luang
16	Namtok Huai Lao
17	Pha Ngam
18	Phu Bo Bit
19	Phu Faek
20	Phu Han–Phu Ra-Ngam
21	Phu Pha Lom
22	Phu Pha Wua
23	Phu Phra
24	Tham Saeng–Tham Phrommawat

== See also ==
- List of national parks of Thailand
- List of Protected Areas Regional Offices of Thailand
