= Phetchabun Mountains =

Mountain range in northern Thailand

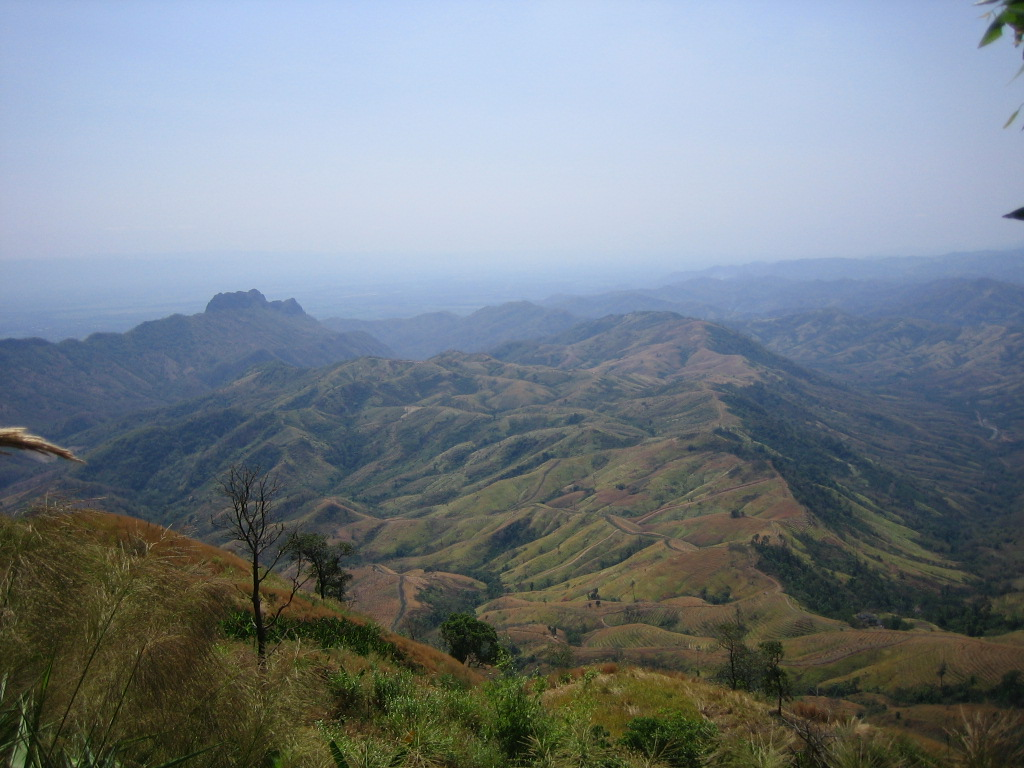
- View over the Phu Hin Rong Kla area

Highest point
- Peak: Phu Thap Boek
- Elevation: 1,794 m (5,886 ft)

Dimensions
- Length: 190 km (120 mi) N/S
- Width: 110 km (68 mi) E/W

Geography
- Physical map of Isan
- Country: Thailand
- Provinces: Phetchabun Province; Phitsanulok Province; Loei Province; Chaiyaphum Province
- Range coordinates: 16°26′N 101°9.1′E
- Parent range: Luang Prabang Mountains (western section)
- Borders on: Luang Prabang Range; Dong Phaya Yen Range

Geology
- Rock types: Sandstone; granite

The Phetchabun Mountains (Thai: ทิวเขาเพชรบูรณ์, RTGS: Thio Khao Phetchabun, pronounced [tʰīw kʰǎw pʰét.tɕʰā.būːn]) are a mountain massif in Phetchabun, Phitsanulok, Loei and Chaiyaphum Provinces, Thailand. It consists of two parallel mountain chains, with the valley of the Pa Sak River in the middle.

The strange rock formations of Phu Hin Rong Kla and fields where the Siam tulip flower (Curcuma alismatifolia), known as dok krachiao (ดอกกระเจียว) in Thai, grows wild are some of the characteristics of the Phetchabun Mountains.

== Geography ==
The mountain system as a whole is named after the city of Phetchabun which lies within the mountainous area. To the south and southeast lie the Dong Phaya Yen Mountains. Both sections of the Phetchabun massif are parallel and of a similar length, extending in a roughly north-south direction. The western range is a prolongation of the southern end of the Luang Prabang Range. The eastern range separates the broad Chao Phraya river basin of central Thailand from the Khorat Plateau of Isan. The northward-flowing Loei River, a tributary of the Mekong, has its sources in the eastern range.

The southern limit of the Phetchabun massif is not clearly defined, roughly beginning south of the 16th parallel north where both ranges become a group of scattered mountains of lesser height, rarely surpassing 800 m, extending southwards. The eastern mountain chain is mentioned as the Phang Hoei Range in some geographical works, a name that encompasses the whole northern section of the Dong Phaya Yen mountain system, for Khao Phang Hoei is a 1,008 m high summit west of Chaiyaphum town, beyond the southern end of the Phetchabun Range proper in the northern Dong Phaya Yen.

The highest elevation of the Phetchabun Mountains is 1,794 m high Phu Thap Boek. Other important peaks are Khao Nam Ko Yai, Phu Kradueng, Phu Luang, Phu Ruea, and Phu Lom Lo.

Geologically, the mountains consist of limestone, interfused with slate and sandstone. A few igneous rocks are also found: granite, basalt and porphyry.

== History ==
Historically the long mountainous system of the Phetchabun-Dong Phaya Yen-Sankamphaeng formed a barrier between Isan and the Central Plain. Until recently few roads crossed the system.

During the period between 1968-1982 the area around 1,143 m high Khao Kho (เขาค้อ) and Phu Hin Rong Kla became an occasional battleground. At that time insurgents of the Communist Party of Thailand established their base in hidden mountain locations and fought skirmishes against the Thai Army.

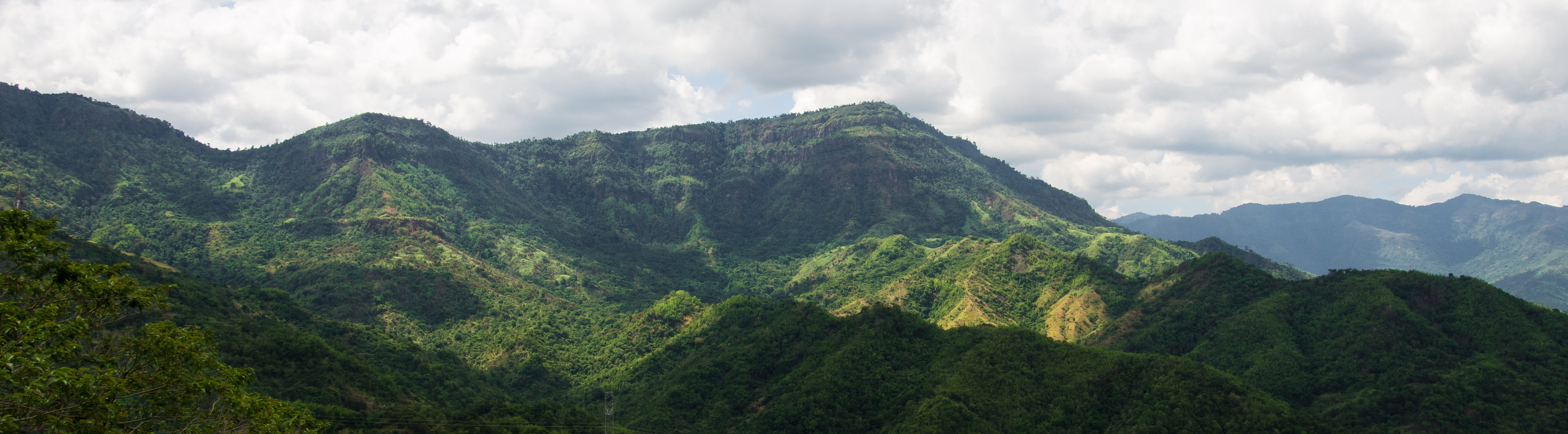
Panoramic view of the Phetchabun Mountains in the Khao Kho District area

== Protected areas ==
Several protected areas, including national parks, forest parks and wildlife reserves are located in these mountains. In 2005 these were accepted by the UNESCO as a possible future addition to the World Heritage list. Besides these protected areas, some forest parks are also located within the area of the range:

- Phu Hin Rong Kla National Park
- Namtok Chat Trakan National Park,
- Nam Nao National Park
- Phu Ruea National Park
- Phu Kradueng National Park
- Suan Hin Pha Ngam Park
- Phu Pha Man National Park
- Phu Luang Wildlife Sanctuary
- Thung Salaeng Luang National Park
- Tat Mok National Park, located at the boundary of the Phetchabun mountain range with the Dong Phaya Yen Mountains.

== Gallery ==
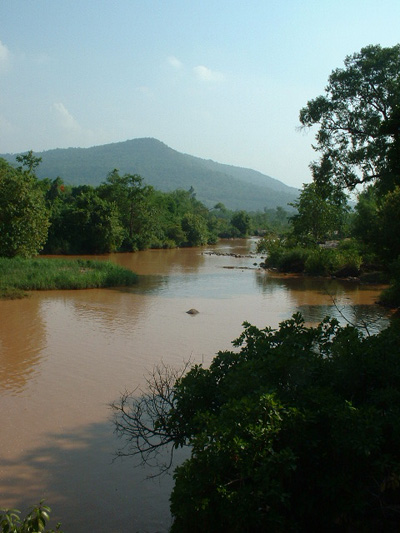
The Khek River in Wang Thong District

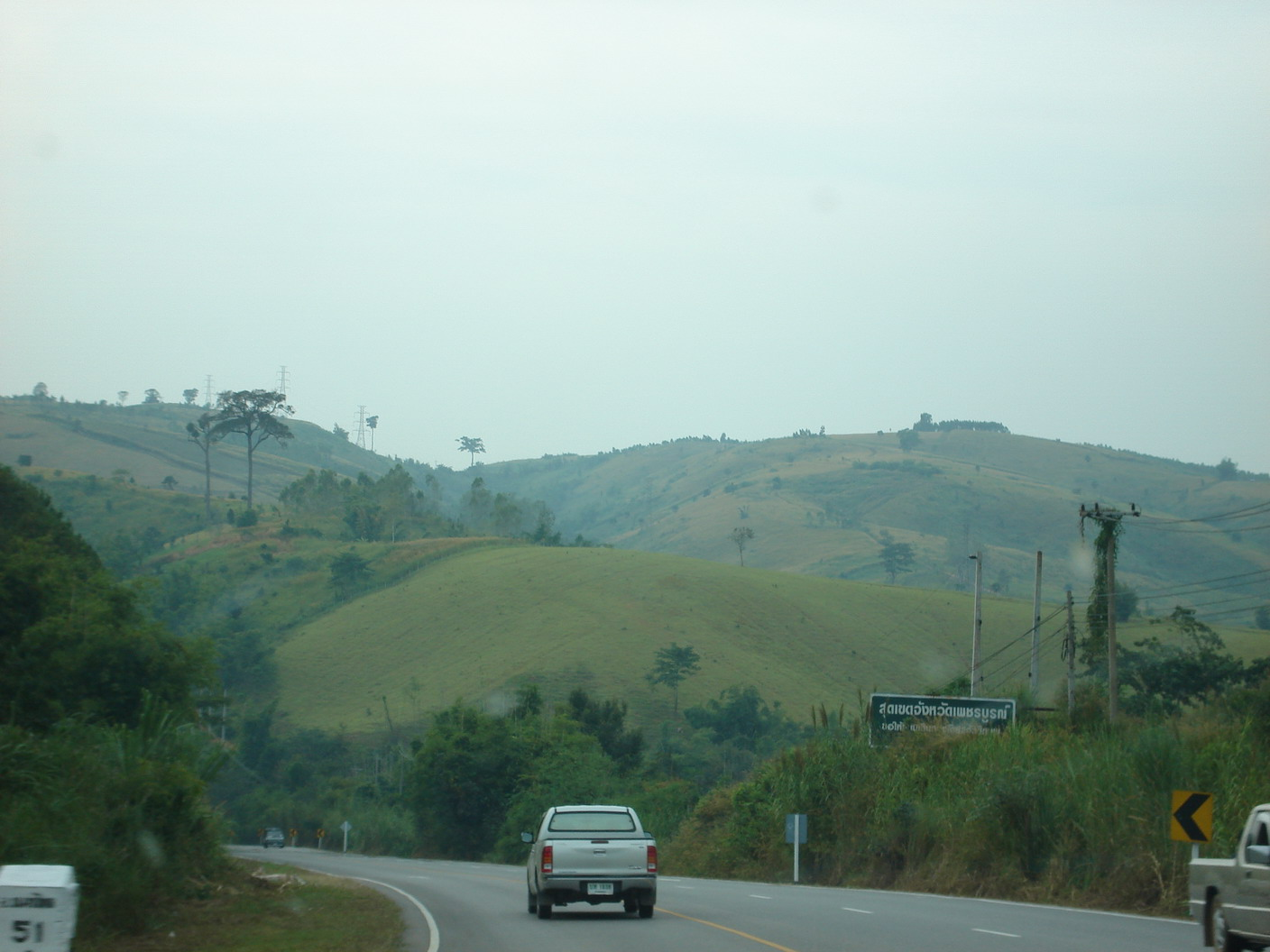
The heights of the range between Phetchabun and Phitsanulok

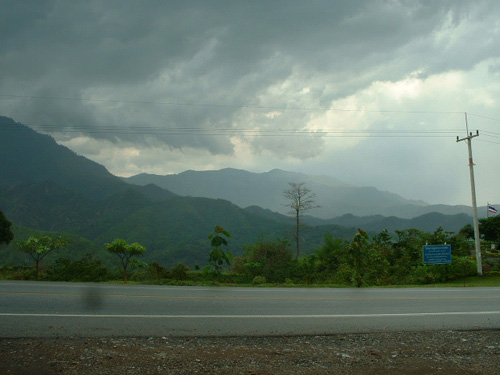
Khao Kho Mountain

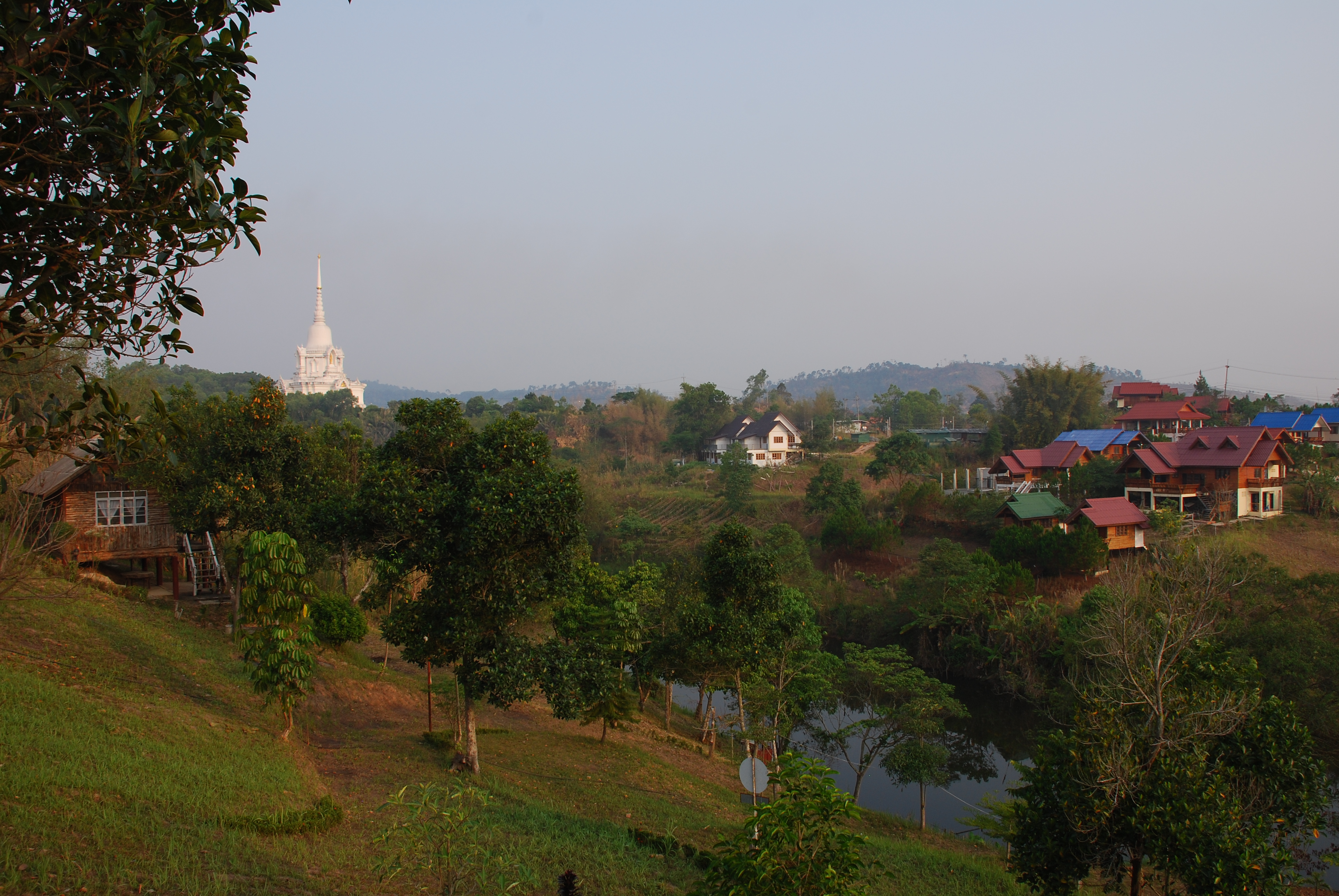
Temple in Khao Kho District
