= Phu Wiang National Park =

National park in Thailand

- อุทยานแห่งชาติภูเวียง
- IUCN category II (national park)
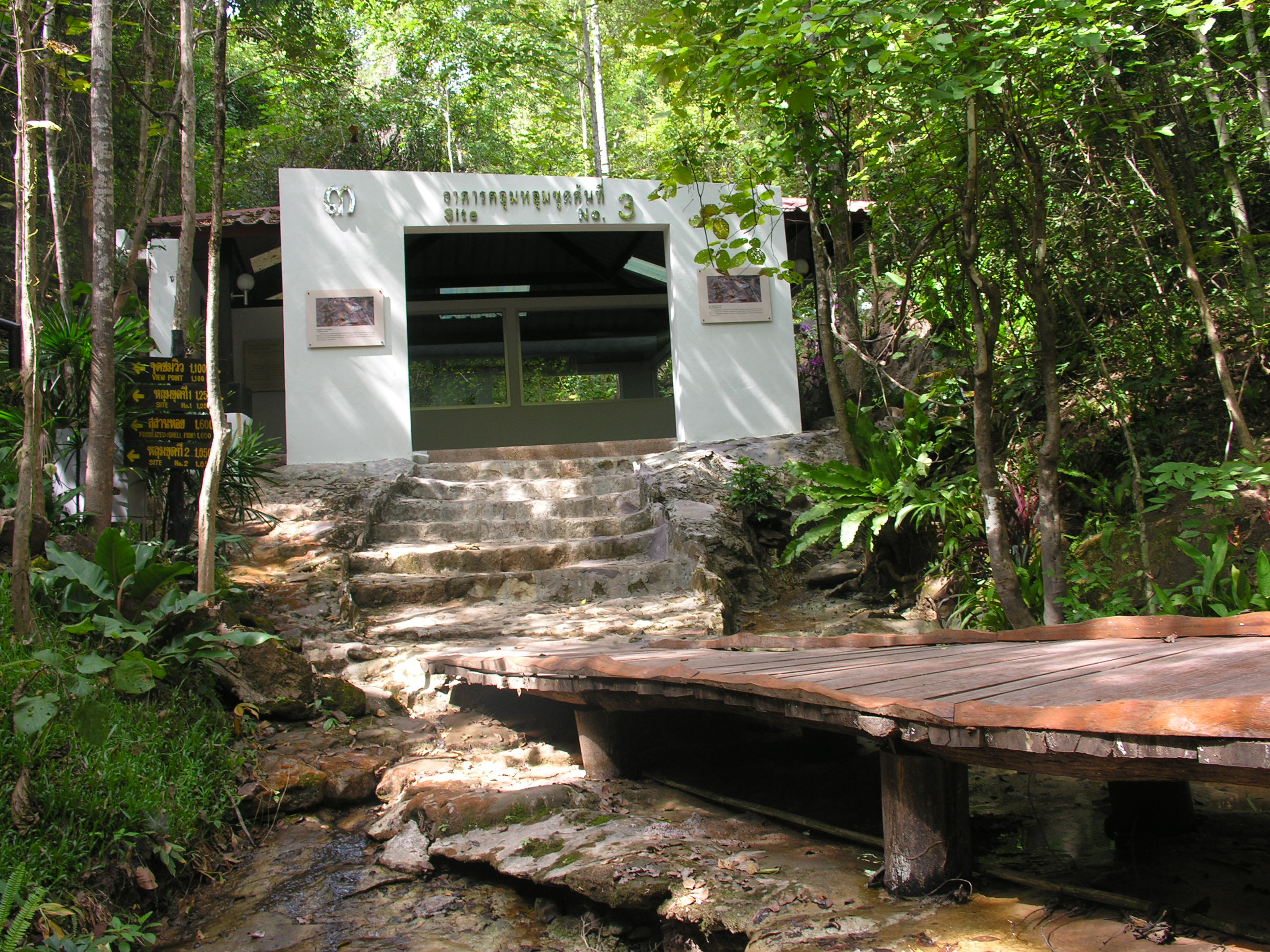
- PWNP Dinosaur Site 3

- Location within Thailand
- Location: Thailand
- Nearest city: Khon Kaen
- Coordinates: 16°40′42″N 102°21′13″E
- Area: 325 km^{2} (125 sq mi)
- Established: 1965
- Visitors: 6,150 (in 2019)
- Governing body: Department of National Parks, Wildlife and Plant Conservation

Phu Wiang National Park (PWNP) is in Khon Kaen Province, northeastern Thailand, covering the area of the Phu Wiang Mountains. It is best known for its numerous dinosaur bone paleontological sites, The park is one of the world's largest dinosaur graveyards. In 1996, the remains of Siamotyrannus isanensis, a new family of carnivorous thunder lizards, were unearthed in the park.

The Phu Wiang Dinosaur Museum in the park displays many of the park's finds. The park, measuring 203,125 rai ~ 325 square kilometres (125 sq mi) in size, is approximately 85 kilometres (53 mi) northwest of Khon Kaen. The area is characterized by a central plain and the low hills of the western Phu Phan Mountains.

== Topography ==
The general topography of the area is a mountain range, shaped as a hollow circle. In the center is a basin. It consists of mountains with moderate slopes to steep slopes. The outermost mountain range has a maximum peak of 844 meters above sea level. The highest peak of the mountain southwest of the area is 470 meters above sea level. The north of the inner mountain area is a source of dinosaur fossils. The lowest level of the foothills is 210 meters above sea level.

Phu Wiang National Park is located on the Khorat plateau. This is caused by the accumulation of sediments on the land that is more than 4,000 meters thick. The sedimentary layer is almost completely red is called the red sediment, or the Khorat stone, consisting of stone units, Khao Phra Wihan, stone pillars, Phu Phan stone and Khok gravel. The rocks were covered with sludge and quaternary clay. In the present day, there is also a survey of the uranium line in the area as well. Phu Wiang National Park is the upstream source of Huai Sai Khao, which flows into Nam Phong Huai Bang, leaving Huai Nam Lai, which will flow into Chern Huai Ruea, Huai Khum Poon, Huai Nam Bon, and Huai Maew, which will flow into Huai Bong, both Nam Phong, Hua Yong. And Chern River flows into Ubol Ratana Dam.

== Fauna ==
Bird species include Black-crested bulbul, Lineated barbet, National bird of Thailand Siamese fireback, Eurasian jay, Common flameback, Green-billed malkoha, Rufescent prinia and Shikra.

There are no large animals but there are small ones include Slow loris, Masked palm civet, Lesser mouse deer, barking deer, Himalayan porcupine, Fishing cat, Large Indian civet and Small Indian civet.

== Location ==
Phu Wiang National Park in overview PARO 8 (Khon Kaen)

6) Phu Wiang National Park in overview PARO 8 (Khon Kaen)

	National park
1	Nam Phong
2	Phu Kradueng
3	Phu Pha Man
4	Phu Ruea
5	Phu Suan Sai
6	Phu Wiang
	Wildlife sanctuary
7	Phu Kho–Phu Kratae
8	Phu Luang

	Non-hunting area
9	Dun Lamphan
10	Lam Pao
11	Tham Pha Nam Thip

	Forest park
12	Chi Long
13	Harirak
14	Kosamphi
15	Namtok Ba Luang
16	Namtok Huai Lao
17	Pha Ngam
18	Phu Bo Bit
19	Phu Faek
20	Phu Han–Phu Ra-Ngam
21	Phu Pha Lom
22	Phu Pha Wua
23	Phu Phra
24	Tham Saeng–Tham Phrommawat

== See also ==
- List of national parks of Thailand
- List of Protected Areas Regional Offices of Thailand
