= Phu Pha Man National Park =

National park in Thailand

- อุทยานแห่งชาติภูผาม่าน
- IUCN category II (national park)
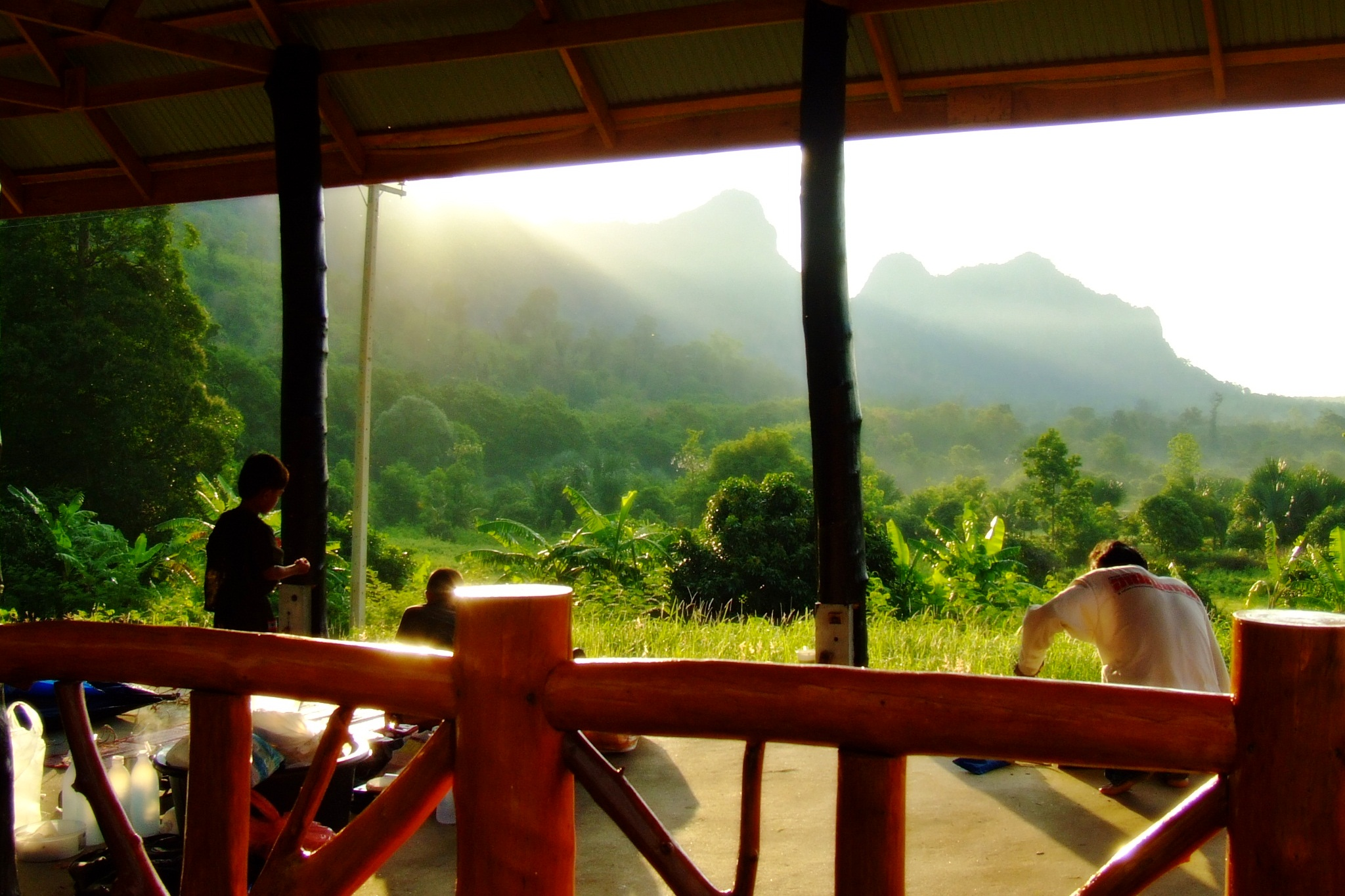
- In 2005

- Location within Thailand
- Location: Thailand
- Nearest city: Khon Kaen
- Coordinates: 16°44′38″N 102°0′4″E
- Area: 350 km^{2} (140 sq mi)
- Established: 2000
- Visitors: 9,682 (in 2019)
- Governing body: Department of National Parks, Wildlife and Plant Conservation

Phu Pha Man National Park (Thai: อุทยานแห่งชาติภูผาม่าน) is a national park in Thailand's Khon Kaen and Loei provinces. This forested park is home to caves, waterfalls and steep cliffs.

== Geography ==
Phu Pha Man National Park is located about 100 kilometres (60 mi) west of the city of Khon Kaen in the Phu Pha Man and Chum Phae districts of Khon Kaen Province and Phu Kradueng District of Loei Province. The park's area is 218,750 rai ~ 350 square kilometres (140 sq mi). Park elevations range from 200 metres (700 ft) to 800 metres (2,620 ft).

== Attractions ==
Klang Khao cave is notable for its large daily exodus of bats at dusk, making a formation about 10 kilometres (6 mi) long. Other park caves feature stalagmite and stalactite formations. The Lai Thaeng cave hosts rock paintings dating back up to 2,000 years.

The park's highest waterfall is Tat Yai waterfall at 80 metres (260 ft) high. Tat Rong waterfall reaches 60–70 metres (200–230 ft) high. The black rock Pha Nok Khao cliff rises above the Phong river.

== Flora and fauna ==
The park's forest types are mostly evergreen and mixed deciduous. Plant life includes rattan, orchid and cogon grass. Park animals include wild boar, barking deer, monitor lizard and pangolin.

== Fossils ==
Fossil tracks of prehistoric animals have been discovered in the park at the Tat Yai waterfall area, which is part of the Huai Hin Lat Formation. They were first discovered in May 2023, and the first tracks discovered belonged to a sauropod. On 10 January 2024, a team of paleontologists from Thailand's Department of Mineral Resources discovered several more prehistoric footprints dating to the late Triassic period around 220–225 million years ago. Several of the footprints belong to dinosaurs, making them the oldest dinosaur tracks discovered in Thailand and Asia. The tracks are in good condition and show the details of the feet of five different species, including dinosaur types such as ornithopods, theropods, sauropods, and archosaurs.

== Location ==
Phu Pha Man National Park in overview PARO 8 (Khon Kaen)

3) Phu Pha Man National Park in overview PARO 8 (Khon Kaen)

	National park
1	Nam Phong
2	Phu Kradueng
3	Phu Pha Man
4	Phu Ruea
5	Phu Suan Sai
6	Phu Wiang
	Wildlife sanctuary
7	Phu Kho–Phu Kratae
8	Phu Luang

	Non-hunting area
9	Dun Lamphan
10	Lam Pao
11	Tham Pha Nam Thip

	Forest park
12	Chi Long
13	Harirak
14	Kosamphi
15	Namtok Ba Luang
16	Namtok Huai Lao
17	Pha Ngam
18	Phu Bo Bit
19	Phu Faek
20	Phu Han–Phu Ra-Ngam
21	Phu Pha Lom
22	Phu Pha Wua
23	Phu Phra
24	Tham Saeng–Tham Phrommawat

== See also ==
- List of national parks of Thailand
- List of Protected Areas Regional Offices of Thailand
