= Phu Luang Wildlife Sanctuary =

Wildlife sanctuary in northern Thailand

- IUCN category IV (habitat/species management area)
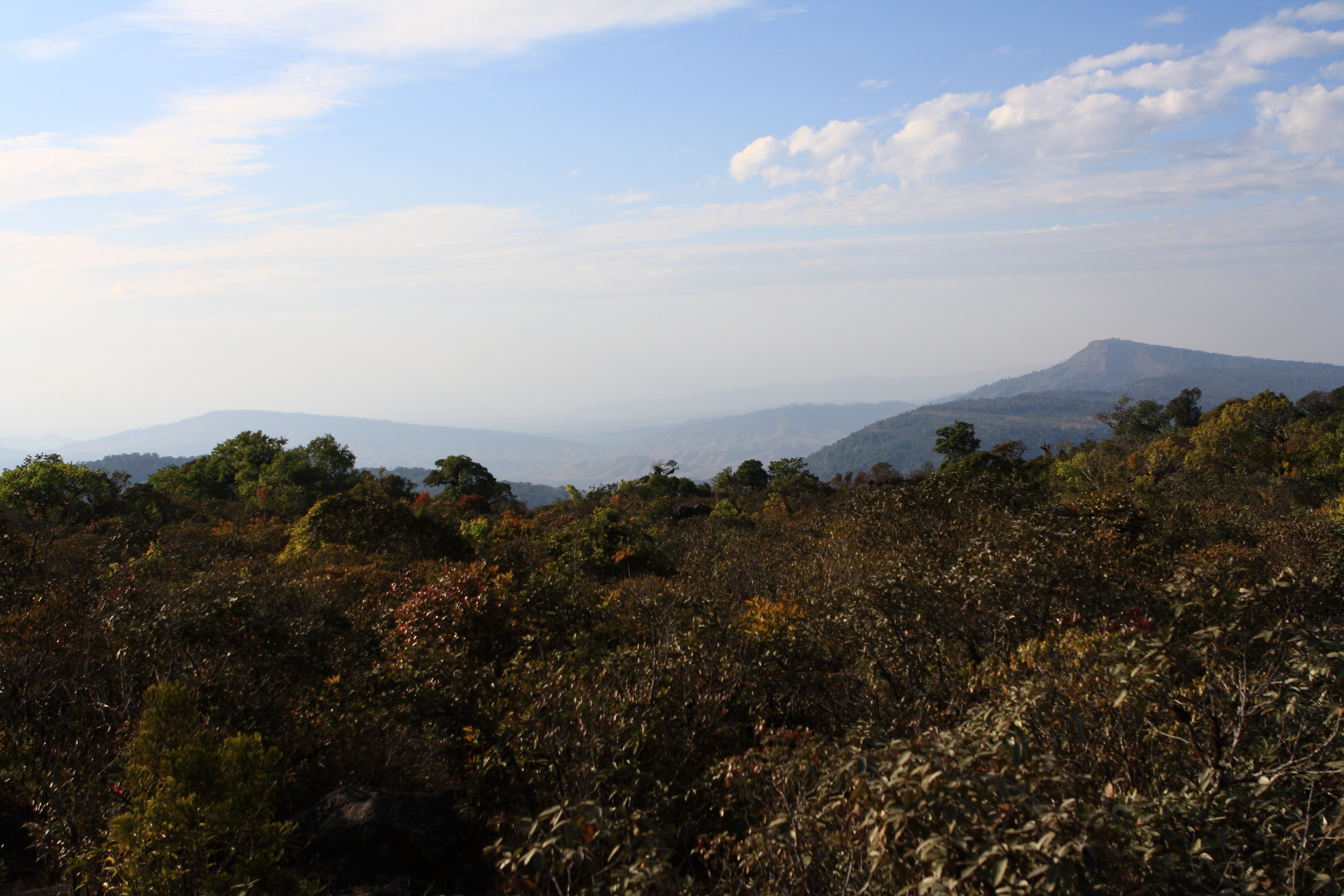

- Location within Thailand
- Location: Thailand
- Nearest city: Loei
- Coordinates: 17°7′16″N 101°32′48″E
- Area: 896.95 km^{2} (346.31 sq mi)
- Established: 18 December 1974
- Governing body: Wildlife Conservation Office

Phu Luang Wildlife Sanctuary (Thai: เขตรักษาพันธุ์สัตว์ป่าภูหลวง) is a wildlife sanctuary in northern Thailand, located in the Phu Luang mountain area, in the south of Loei Province. The area around the mountain is part of the Luang Prabang montane rain forests ecoregion.

It covers an area of 897 km^{2} (346 sq mi), covering area of the tambon Pla Ba and Tha Sala of Phu Ruea District, Phon Sung, Wang Yao and I Pum of Dan Sai, Nong Ngio and Saikhao of Wang Saphung, and Phu Ho of Phu Luang District.

== History ==
The wildlife reserve was established in 1974. In 1985 it was further enlarged by 97 km^{2} (37 sq mi). The reserve is named after its highest mountain, which peaks at 1,571 m (5,154 ft). The reserve covers the whole mountain plateau around the peak, which has an elevation of around 1,200 m (3,900 ft). To west of the reserve the Loei River originates. "Phu Luang" means "large mountain" or the "mountain of the king", formed by an uplift of the Earth's crust and a slide of soft soil down to lower elevations.

== Environment ==
There are three seasons at Phu Luang. Summer runs from February to April with an average temperature of 20–24 °C (68–75 °F). During this season, flowers such as dendrobiums, white wild orchids, white and red rhododendrons bloom. The rainy season is from May to October, when the temperature is equal to or slightly higher than in summer. There will be tiny wild flowers in purplish pink scattered in the savanna. The temperature drops during the winter to 0–16 °C (32–61 °F) in November – January. On some days, the temperature can drop to −4 °C (25 °F). During this season, kuam daeng (Acer calcaratum) will turn red and shed their leaves. Kradum ngoen (Eriocaulon henryanum Ruhle) and lady's slipper orchids (Paphiopedilum sukhakulii Schoser & Senghas) make up the undergrowth of the hill evergreen forest. On the east side of Phu Luang dinosaur footprints on the rock, aged more than 120 million years, were discovered.

There are various kinds of forests such as mixed deciduous forest, dry evergreen forest, and hill evergreen forest. The most prominent ones at Phu Luang are Pinus merkusii and Khasi pine forests, savanna on plains, mounds, and stone terraces. The wildlife sanctuary has organised the Phu Luang Nature Study Route, starting from Amphoe Phu Ruea at Khok Nok Kraba, passing Lan Suriyan, Pha Somdet, and the dinosaur footprints.

The reserve is home to an estimated 100 wild Asian elephants. The Elephants Rehabilitation Project within the wildlife reserve is under the patronage of Queen Sirikit.

The Phu Luang cliff frog (Huia aureola) was found within the reserve in 2006, notable for its ability to change color. Also more than 160 species of orchids grow in the area.

== Location ==
Phu Luang Wildlife Sanctuary in overview PARO 8 (Khon Kaen)

8) Phu Luang Wildlife Sanctuary in overview PARO 8 (Khon Kaen)

	National park
1	Nam Phong
2	Phu Kradueng
3	Phu Pha Man
4	Phu Ruea
5	Phu Suan Sai
6	Phu Wiang
	Wildlife sanctuary
7	Phu Kho–Phu Kratae
8	Phu Luang

	Non-hunting area
9	Dun Lamphan
10	Lam Pao
11	Tham Pha Nam Thip

	Forest park
12	Chi Long
13	Harirak
14	Kosamphi
15	Namtok Ba Luang
16	Namtok Huai Lao
17	Pha Ngam
18	Phu Bo Bit
19	Phu Faek
20	Phu Han–Phu Ra-Ngam
21	Phu Pha Lom
22	Phu Pha Wua
23	Phu Phra
24	Tham Saeng–Tham Phrommawat
