= Pongpanot Naknayom =

Thai footballer (born 1979)

Personal information
- Full name: Pongpanot Naknayom
- Date of birth: 5 January 1979 (age 47)
- Place of birth: Phetchabun, Thailand
- Height: 1.81 m (5 ft 11 1/2 in)
- Position: Goalkeeper

Senior career*
Years	Team	Apps	(Gls)
2004–2013	Chonburi	76	(0)
2013	BEC Tero Sasana	14	(0)
2014	PTT Rayong	25	(0)
2015	Rayong	12	(0)
2016–2017	Ubon UMT United	40	(0)
2018–2019	Police Tero	5	(0)
2019	Rayong	6	(0)
Total		178	(0)
- * Club domestic league appearances and goals as of 02:00, 6 April 2019 (UTC)

Pongpanot Naknayom (Thai: พงศ์ปณต นาคนายม) is a Thai football manager and former football player.

== Honours ==
=== Clubs ===
==== Chonburi ====
- Thailand Premier League: 2007
- Kor Royal Cup: 2007
- Kor Royal Cup: 2009

==== Rayong F.C. ====
- Regional League Central-East Division: 2015
