= Sittisak Tarapan =

Thai footballer (born 1984)

Personal information
- Full name: Sittisak Tarapan
- Date of birth: 23 November 1984 (age 41)
- Place of birth: Phetchabun, Thailand
- Height: 1.74 m (5 ft 8 1/2 in)
- Positions: Left winger; left back

Team information
- Current team: Army United
- Number: 20

Youth career
- 2005: Chula United

Senior career*
Years	Team	Apps	(Gls)
2006–2010	TOT	52	(6)
2011–2014	BBCU	18	(1)
2015–2017	Navy	64	(1)
2017	Sisaket	13	(0)
2018	Phrae United		
2018–	Army United		
- * Club domestic league appearances and goals as of 14 January 2009 ‡ National team caps and goals as of 5 February 2009

Sittisak Tarapan (Thai สิทธิศักดิ์ ตาระพัน) is a Thai footballer. He is currently playing for Army United in the Thai League 2.
