= Phu Ruea =

Mountain in Thailand

- ภูเรือ
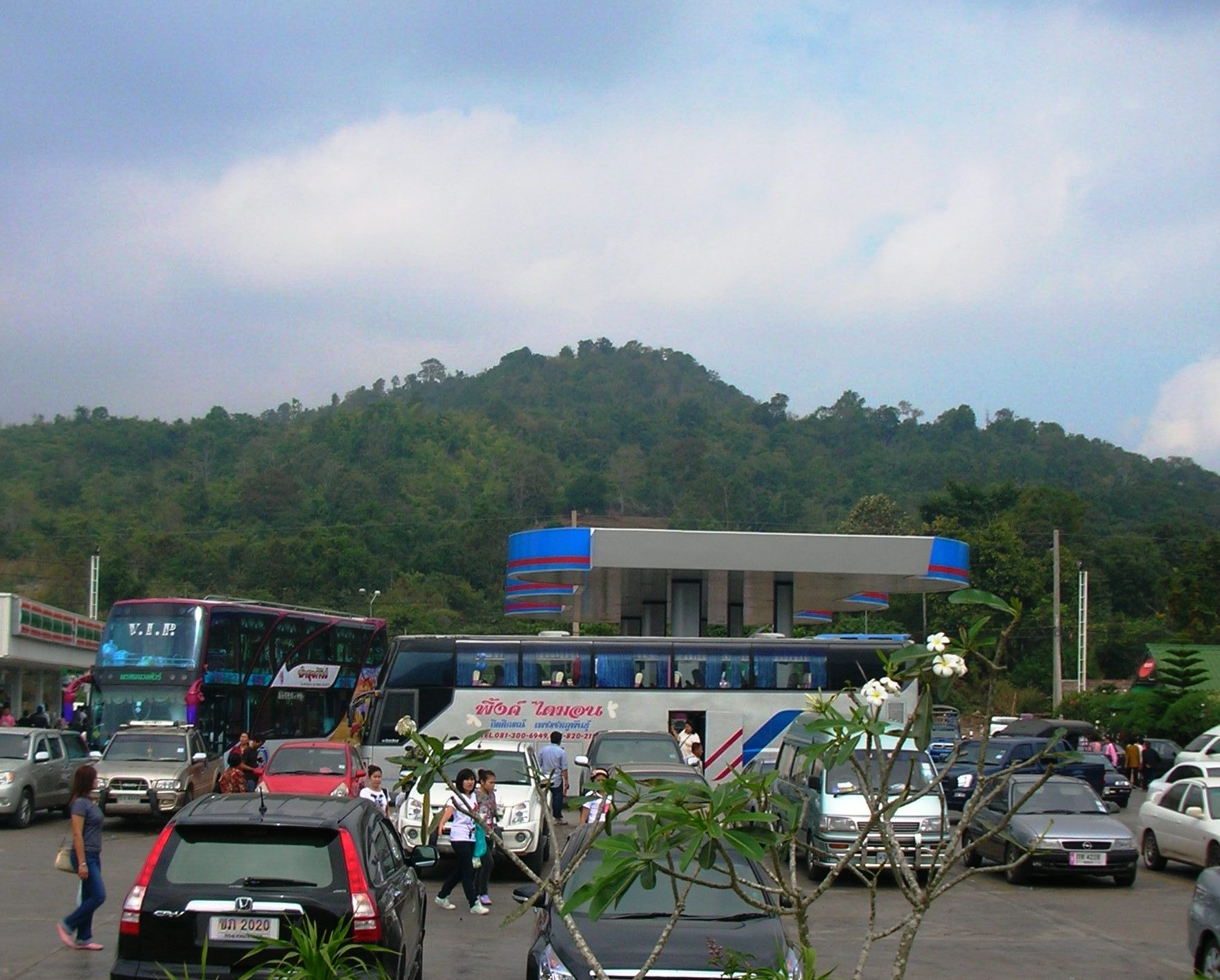
- South side of the summit seen from Route 203

Highest point
- Elevation: 1,365 m (4,478 ft)
- Listing: List of mountains in Thailand
- Coordinates: 17°30′00″N 101°20′00″E

Geography
- Location within Thailand
- Location: Loei, Thailand
- Parent range: Phetchabun Mountains

Geology
- Mountain type: sandstone

Phu Ruea (Thai: ภูเรือ), is a 1365 m high mountain in Loei province, Thailand. It is in Phu Ruea district. This mountain is part of the Phetchabun Mountains, a massif forming a natural boundary between northern Thailand and Isan. The peak rises seven kilometers north of Highway 203, between Loei town and Phetchabun. The name of the mountain comes from the fact that it looks like an upside down boat (Thai: เรือ) from certain angles.

The Phu Ruea High Altitude Agricultural Research Station is on the mountain and Phu Ruea National Park encompasses the peak. The park borders Sainyabuli province in Laos at its northern end. Most of the mountain is covered in mixed evergreen forest. The area around the mountain is part of the Luang Prabang montane rain forests ecoregion.

== See also ==
- List of mountains in Thailand
- Loei province
