= Lom Kao district =

Lom Kao หล่มเก่า
- District
- District location in Phetchabun province
- Coordinates: 16°53′8″N 101°13′46″E
- Country: Thailand
- Province: Phetchabun

Area
  - Total: 927.1 km^{2} (358.0 sq mi)

Population (2015)
  - Total: 67,101
  - Density: 65/km^{2} (170/sq mi)
- Time zone: UTC+7 (ICT)
- Postal code: 67120
- Geocode: 6704

Lom Kao (Thai: หล่มเก่า, pronounced [lòm kàw]) is the northernmost district (amphoe) of Phetchabun province, northern Thailand.

== History ==
The first record of Mueang Lom is found in Ram Khamhaeng the Great's stone pillar. In the Rattanakosin era, the area was populated by a large community of Lao people from Vientiane. The population grew due to further immigration from Luang Prabang and Vientiane, so the governor led some people to establish a new town near the Pa Sak River, now in the Lom Sak district.

== Geography ==
Neighboring districts are (from the north clockwise) Dan Sai and Phu Ruea of Loei province and Nam Nao, Lom Sak, and Khao Kho of Phetchabun Province.

== Administration ==
=== Central administration ===
Lom Kao district is divided into nine sub-districts (tambons), which are further subdivided into 99 administrative villages (mubans).

No.	Name	Thai	Villages	Pop.
1.	Lom Kao	หล่มเก่า	13	11,959
2.	Na Sam	นาซำ	10	7,345
3.	Hin Hao	หินฮาว	13	7,506
4.	Ban Noen	บ้านเนิน	8	5,254
5.	Sila	ศิลา	16	10,066
6.	Na Saeng	นาแซง	7	3,921
7.	Wang Ban	วังบาล	17	11,649
8.	Na Ko	นาเกาะ	6	2,642
9.	Tat Kloi	ตาดกลอย	9	6,759

=== Local administration ===
There is one sub-district municipality (thesaban tambon) in the district:

- Lom Kao (Thai: เทศบาลตำบลหล่มเก่า) consisting of parts of sub-district Lom Kao.

There are nine sub-district administrative organizations (SAO) in the district:

- Lom Kao (Thai: องค์การบริหารส่วนตำบลหล่มเก่า) consisting of parts of sub-district, Lom Kao.
- Na Sam (Thai: องค์การบริหารส่วนตำบลนาซำ) consisting of sub-district, Na Sam.
- Hin Hao (Thai: องค์การบริหารส่วนตำบลหินฮาว) consisting of sub-district, Hin Hao.
- Ban Noen (Thai: องค์การบริหารส่วนตำบลบ้านเนิน) consisting of sub-district, Ban Noen.
- Sila (Thai: องค์การบริหารส่วนตำบลศิลา) consisting of sub-district, Sila.
- Na Saeng (Thai: องค์การบริหารส่วนตำบลนาแซง) consisting of sub-district, Na Saeng.
- Wang Ban (Thai: องค์การบริหารส่วนตำบลวังบาล) consisting of sub-district, Wang Ban.
- Na Ko (Thai: องค์การบริหารส่วนตำบลนาเกาะ) consisting of sub-district, Na Ko.
- Tat Kloi (Thai: องค์การบริหารส่วนตำบลตาดกลอย) consisting of sub-district, Tat Kloi.
