= Khao Kho district =

Khao Kho เขาค้อ
- District
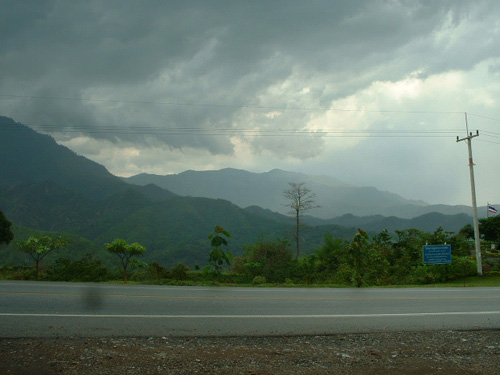
- Khao Kho in the rain seen from Highway 12

- District location in Phetchabun province
- Coordinates: 16°38′0″N 100°59′54″E
- Country: Thailand
- Province: Phetchabun
- Seat: Khao Kho

Area
  - Total: 1,333.0 km^{2} (514.7 sq mi)

Population (2005)
  - Total: 32,932
  - Density: 24.7/km^{2} (64/sq mi)
- Time zone: UTC+7 (ICT)
- Postal code: 67270
- Geocode: 6711

Khao Kho (Thai: เขาค้อ, pronounced [kʰǎw kʰɔ́ː]) is a district (amphoe) of Phetchabun province, northern Thailand.

== Etymology ==
The name of the district comes from Khao Kho, a peak in the Phetchabun Mountains, named either after Livistona speciosa, a kind of palm tree, or after the Ceylon oak. Both species are known as kho (Thai: ค้อ) in Thai and are abundant in the area.

== History ==
Khao Kho was established as a minor district (king amphoe) on 21 August 1984 by splitting the two tambons Thung Samo and Khaem Son from Lom Sak district. It was upgraded to a full district on 19 July 1991.

Between 1965 and 1984, this mountainous area was a battleground in the fight between the Thai communist party and the Royal Thai Army.

== Geography ==
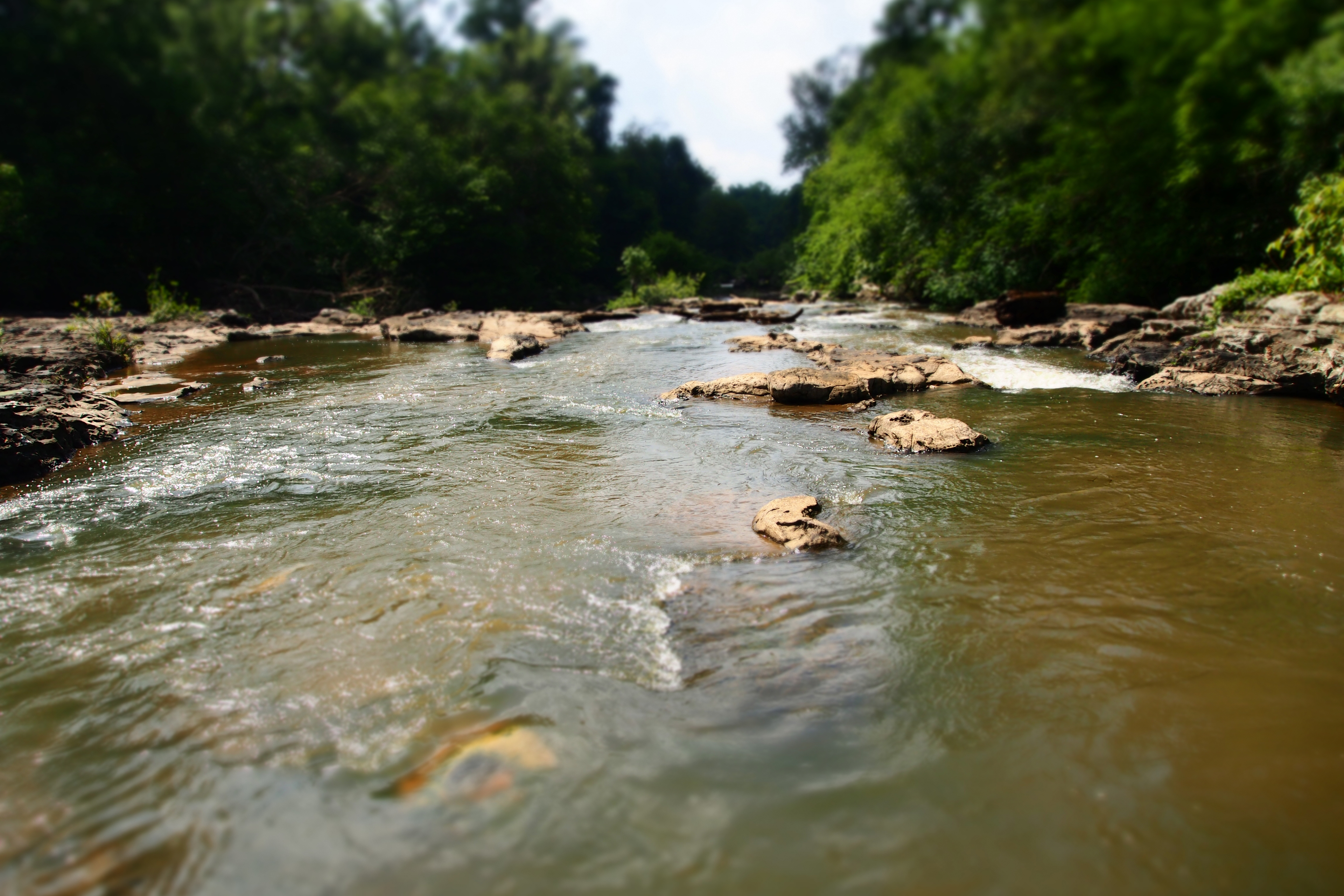
Kaeng Bang Rachan, the islets of the Khek river in the middle of the Thung Salaeng Luang forest, home to rare aquatic invertebrates, freshwater jellyfish

Neighbouring districts are (from the east clockwise) Lom Kao, Lom Sak and Mueang Phetchabun of Phetchabun Province, Noen Maprang, Wang Thong and Nakhon Thai of Phitsanulok province, and Dan Sai of Loei province.

The Phetchabun Mountains are a mountain chain in Khao Kho.

== Administration ==
The district is divided into seven sub-districts (tambons), which are further subdivided into 72 villages (mubans). There are no municipal areas (thesabans) in the district. There are five tambon administrative organizations (TAO).

No.	Name	Thai name	Villages	Pop.
1.	Khao Kho	เขาค้อ	14	6,467
2.	Khaem Son	แคมป์สน	14	5,284
3.	Thung Samo	ทุ่งสมอ	11	4,013
4.	Rim Si Muang	ริมสีม่วง	6	1,293
5.	Sado Phong	สะเดาะพง	5	1,432
6.	Nong Mae Na	หนองแม่นา	10	2,594
7.	Khek Noi	เข็กน้อย	12	11,849

== Population ==
At present, Khek Noi Sub-district is home to the largest Hmong community in Thailand.
