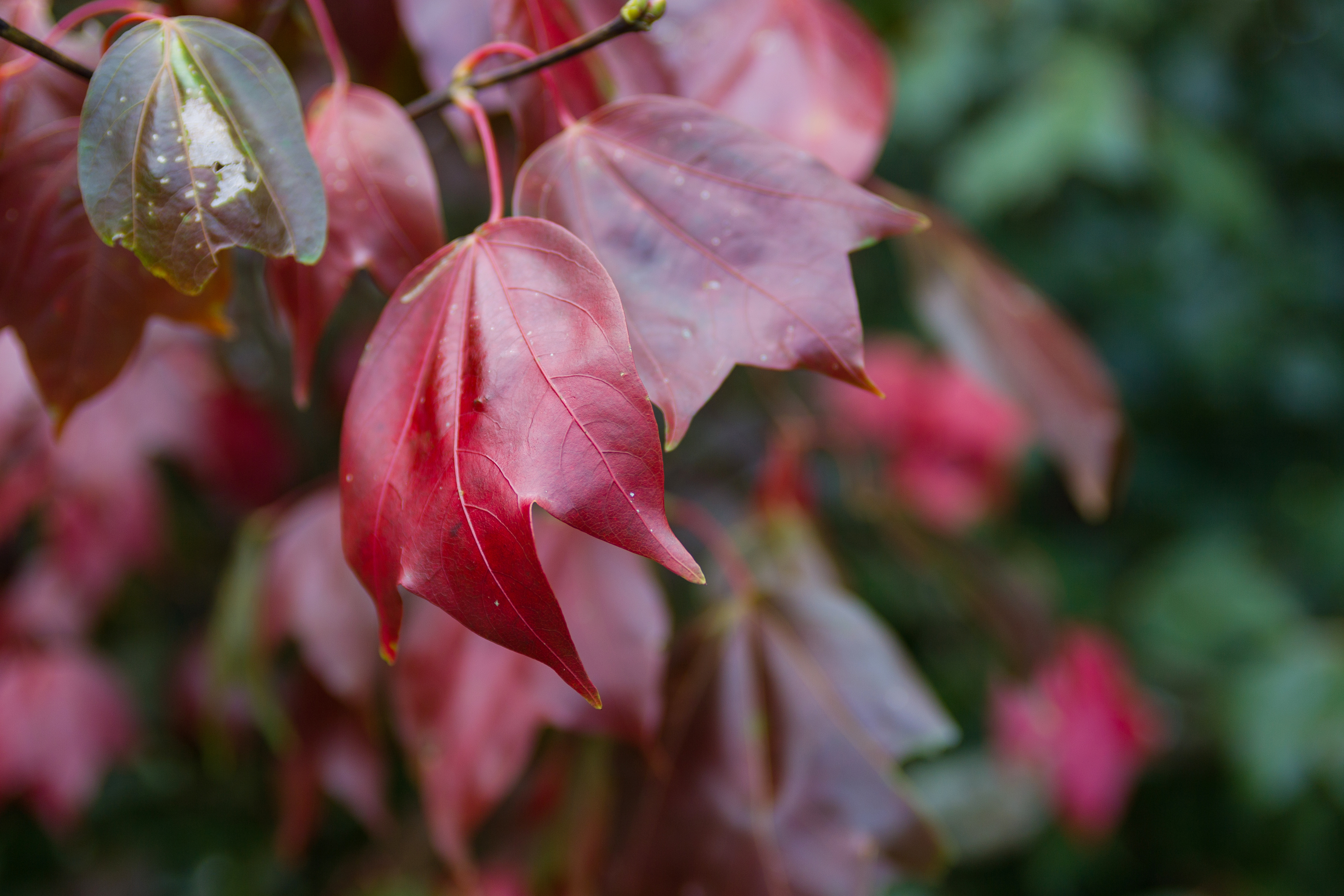

Conservation status
- Vulnerable (IUCN 3.1)

Scientific classification
- Kingdom: Plantae
- Clade: Tracheophytes
- Clade: Angiosperms
- Clade: Eudicots
- Clade: Rosids
- Order: Sapindales
- Family: Sapindaceae
- Genus: Acer
- Section: Acer sect. Palmata
- Series: Acer ser. Palmata
- Species: A. calcaratum

Binomial name
- Acer calcaratum Gagnep. 1948

Synonyms
- Acer isolobum Kurz 1872, illegitimate homonym not A.Massal 1859; Acer craibianum Delendick; Acer osmastonii Gamble; Acer wilsonii subsp. burmense A.E.Murray

= Acer calcaratum =

Species of flowering plant

Acer calcaratum is an Asian species of maple found in Yunnan and northern Indochina (Myanmar, Thailand, Vietnam). It is very rare in China.

Acer calcaratum is a small tree up to 7 meters tall. Leaves are non-compound, the blade up to 15 cm long and 21 cm wide, with 3 deeply cut lobes but no teeth.
