= Phetchabun province =

Phetchabun เพชรบูรณ์
- Province
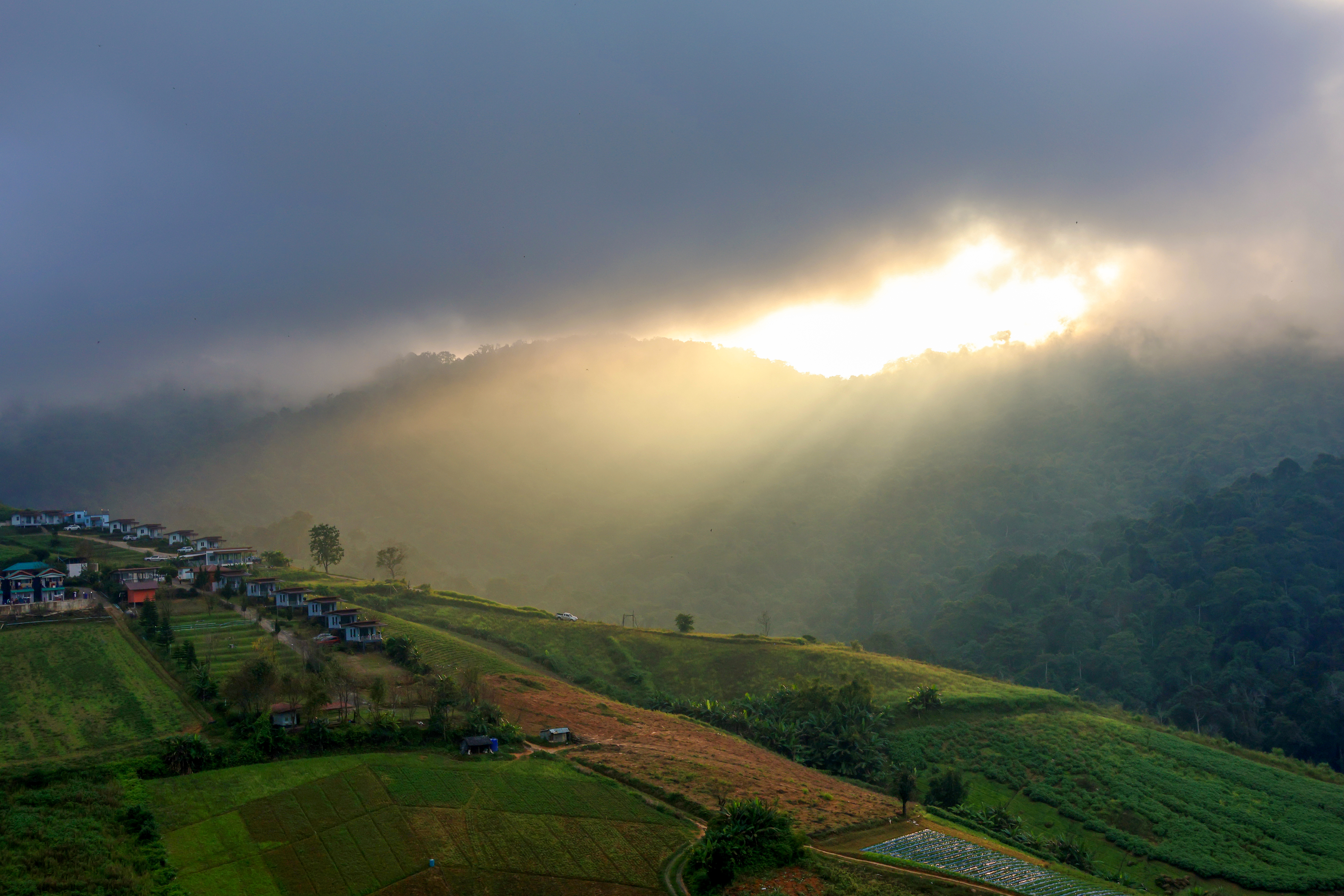
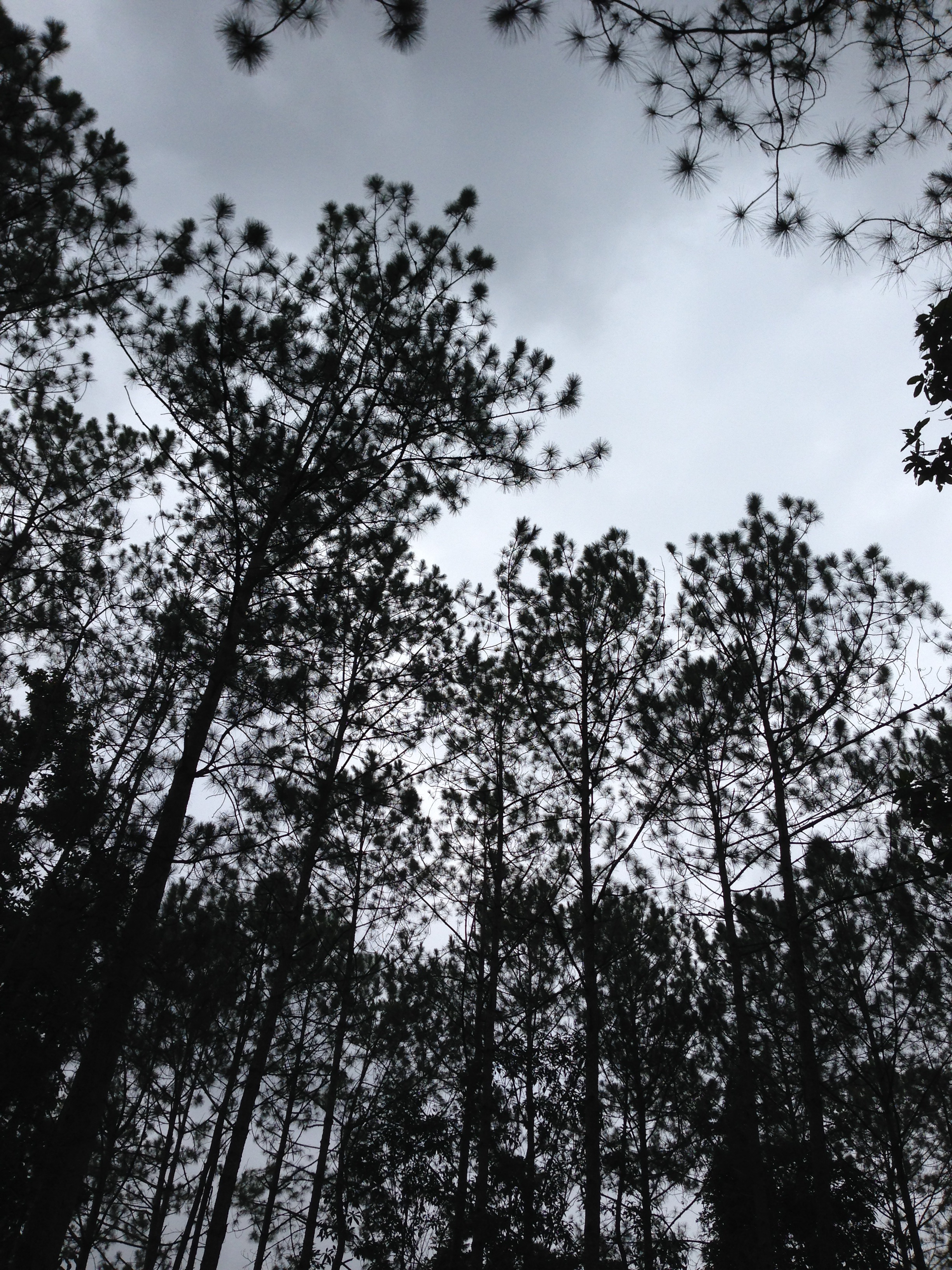
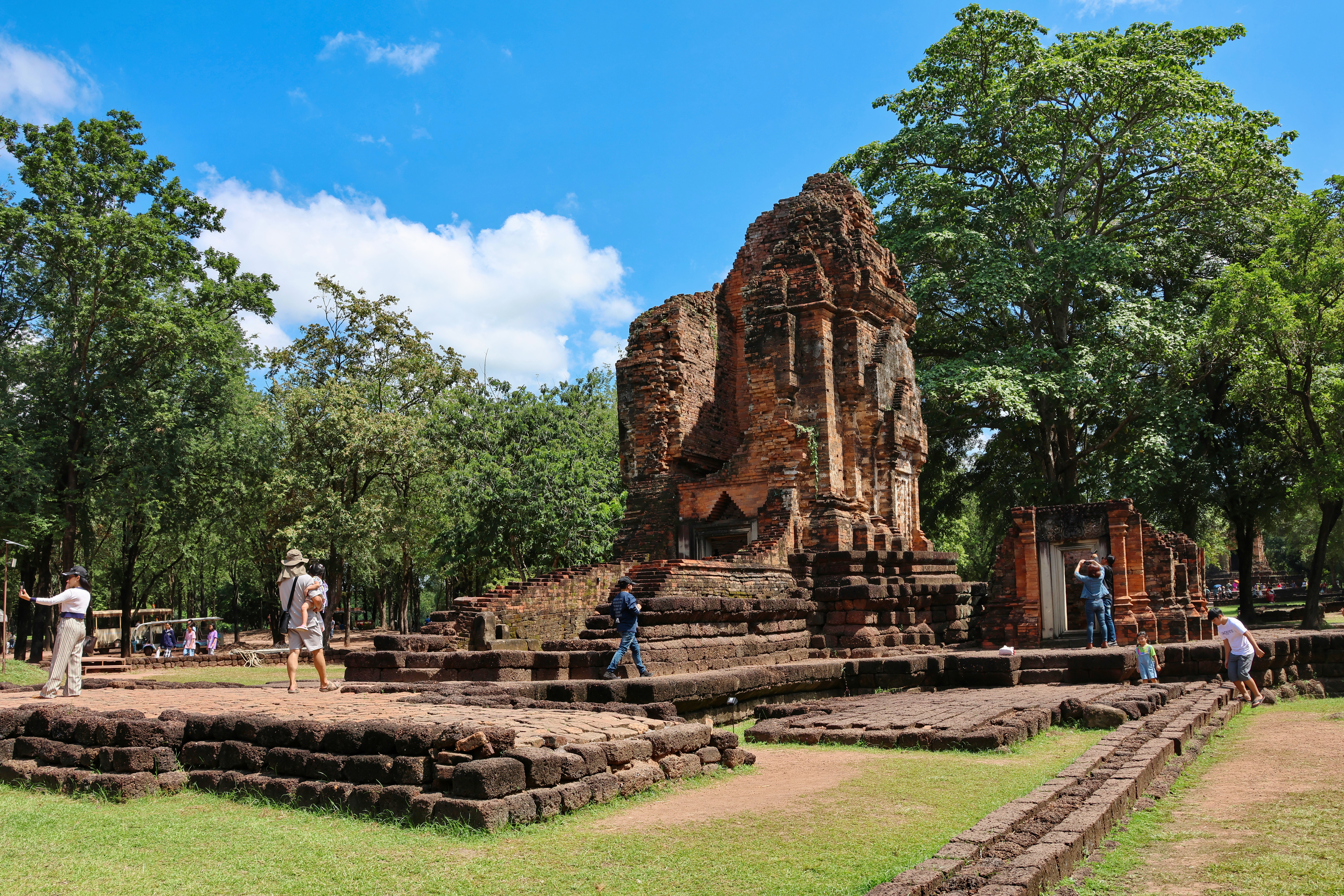
- Phu Thap Boek Pine forest in Nam Nao National Park Si Thep Historical Park

- Flag Seal
- Nickname: Mueang Makham Wan (city of sweet tamarinds)
- Mottoes: เมืองมะขามหวาน อุทยานน้ำหนาว ศรีเทพเมืองเก่า เขาค้ออนุสรณ์ นครพ่อขุนผาเมือง ("City of sweet tamarinds. Nam Nao National Park. The old town of Si Thep. The monument of Khao Kho. Capital of Pho Khun Pha Mueang.")
- Map of Thailand highlighting Phetchabun province
- Coordinates: 16°20′N 101°06′E
- Country: Thailand
- Capital: Phetchabun

Government
  - Governor: Saranyu Meethongkham

Area
  - Total: 12,340 km^{2} (4,760 sq mi)
  - Rank: 10th

Population (2024)
  - Total: ▼960,718
  - Rank: 23rd
  - Density: 78/km^{2} (200/sq mi)
  - Rank: 76th

Human Achievement Index
  - HAI (2022): 0.6337 "somewhat low" Ranked 47th

GDP
  - Total: baht 77 billion (US$2.6 billion) (2019)
- Time zone: UTC+7 (ICT)
- Postal code: 67xxx
- Calling code: 056 & 043
- ISO 3166 code: TH-67
- Website: phetchabun.go.th

Phetchabun Provincial Administrative Organization องค์การบริหารส่วนจังหวัดเพชรบูรณ์
- Provincial Administrative Organization
- Interactive map of Phetchabun Provincial Administrative Organization

Government
  - Type: Local administrative divisions
  - Body: Phetchabun Provincial Administrative Organization
  - President: Akaradej Thongjaisod
- Website: phetchabunpao.go.th

Phetchabun (Thai: เพชรบูรณ์, pronounced [pʰét.tɕʰā.būːn]) is one of Thailand's seventy-six provinces (changwat) and lies in lower northern Thailand. Neighbouring provinces are (from north clockwise) Loei, Khon Kaen, Chaiyaphum, Lopburi, Nakhon Sawan, Phichit and Phitsanulok.

The ancient town of Si Thep, in the south of the province, carries one of the oldest Sanskrit inscriptions found in Thailand, and excavation there has dated occupation from the fourth century onwards. In the administrative reforms of the early 20th century the province formed monthon Phetchabun, the smallest of the monthon and the first to be dissolved. Communist insurgents held bases in the mountains between 1968 and 1982. Tourism is now the main industry, and the province is known for sweet tamarind and for the cabbage grown around Phu Thap Boek.

== Toponymy ==
The word phetcha originates from the Sanskrit word vajra meaning "diamond" (or weapon of Indra), and the word bun from Sanskrit purna meaning "full", "perfect" or "whole". Hence the name of the province literally means "perfect diamond".

Initially, the province was called "Phe-cha-buth" as "Phuenchapura", which means the city that has plenty of crops. The reason is that the province is very fertile and has ample resources. Phetchabun has long been an agriculturally productive area.

== Geography and climate ==
Phetchabun is in the lower northern region of Thailand, in the area between the northern and the central region. The province lies in the broad fertile river valley of the Pa Sak River, with mountains of the Phetchabun mountain range to the east and west. The total forest area is 4,013 km^{2} (1,549 sq mi) or 32.5 percent of provincial area.

=== National parks ===
There are ten national parks in region 11 (Phitsanulok) of which four are in Phetchabun province. (Visitors in fiscal year 2024)

Thung Salaeng Luang National Park	1,262 km^{2} (487 sq mi)	(47,395)
Nam Nao National Park	966 km^{2} (373 sq mi)	(26,942)
Khao Kho National Park	483 km^{2} (186 sq mi)	(29,030)
Tat Mok National Park	290 km^{2} (110 sq mi)	(37,902)

=== Wildlife sanctuaries ===
There are six wildlife sanctuaries in region 11 (Phitsanulok) of which two and Phu Luang W.S. in region 8 (Khon Kaen) are in Phetchabun province.

Phu Luang Wildlife Sanctuary	897 km^{2} (346 sq mi)
Tabo–Huai Yai Wildlife Sanctuary	654 km^{2} (253 sq mi)
Phu Pha Daeng Wildlife Sanctuary	235 km^{2} (91 sq mi)

Phetchabun especially Khao Kho is a place with good weather and cold all year round. Therefore, received the nickname "Switzerland of Thailand".

=== Protected areas ===
Overview of protected areas of Phetchabun

Phetchabun protected areas

	National park
1	Khao Kho
2	Nam Nao
3	Tat Mok
4	Thung Salaeng Luang

	Wildlife sanctuary
5	Phu Luang
6	Phu Pha Daeng
7	Tabo-Huai Yai

== History ==
The ancient city of Si Thep, in the south of the province, carries one of the oldest Sanskrit stone inscriptions from Thailand, K. 499, which records puṇya or meritorious work in a Brahmanical setting. Two images of Kṛṣṇa Govardhanadhāra of about the late sixth and the late seventh century were found at the same city, and Claude Jacques argued from that early cult of Kṛṣṇa that Si Thep was Dvāravatī itself.

Excavation has given the town a sequence of absolute dates. A burial group near the centre of the circular moated site returned a radiocarbon age of 1,730 ± 30 BP, or 240–390 CE, on a human tooth; thermoluminescence dates the circular moat to 414–602 and a ruin inside the rectangular extension east of it to 505–681. Outside the wall, the subsidiary stupas at Khao Khlang Nok fall between 270 and 610 and the main mound between 720 and 875, while the foundation of Prang Song Phi Nong gives 736 ± 33 BP, or 1214–1247. Suriya Sudsawat, who reports the results, states that there is no evidence whether the people who used the burial ground and those who laid out the town were the same. He also notes that of the eleven Hindu images attributed to Si Thep only one, a Surya, has a recorded find-spot. A further inscription, from Nong Mai So 12 km north of the town, is in Khmer script and language and of the 10th or 11th century; it names an officer and a female servant, from which he concludes only that Khmer speakers were present in the area. Wheels of the law are also recorded from the city, several of them now in the Ramkhamhaeng National Museum in Sukhothai. A pillar found at Si Thep in 1998 carries the first inscription in the Indian śaṅkhalipi or shell script recorded from mainland Southeast Asia. The Fine Arts Department had published it as a pillar with carved decoration, and Nicolas Revire recognised the script only in 2013. The text is undeciphered.

Srisak Vallibhotama counts Phetchabun among the seven modern provinces that covered the core of Sukhothai. Inscription 8 places the Pa Sak valley among the areas occupied by Li Thai, with Nan and Chouburi.

Prince Damrong Rajanubhab read the old town of Phetchabun as built in two periods, one when Sukhothai or Phitsanulok was the capital and one in the reign of Narai of Ayutthaya. He took both to have been sited against enemies from the north, and noted that the armies of Si Sattanakhanahut (Lan Xang) came down the Pa Sak almost every time.

In the Thesaphiban administrative reforms at the beginning of the 20th century, the province, together with Lom Sak province to the north, formed monthon Phetchabun. As it was the smallest monthon, it was also the first monthon to be dissolved in 1915, after being temporarily administered from Monthon Phitsanulok between 1903 and 1907. Lom Sak province was abolished and merged into Phetchabun in 1932.

From 1968–1982, communist insurgents established bases in the mountains in the province. From hidden locations they fought occasional skirmishes against the Thai Army.

== Symbols ==
The provincial seal shows a diamond on a mountain, as diamonds are found in the province. In the foreground are tobacco plants, as it is one of the crops grown in the province. The provincial tree is the tamarind. Craspedacusta sowerbyi, a rare species of freshwater jellyfish is the provincial aquatic animal. What with Phetchabun is one of the few places in the world, that is the habitat of this species of invertebrates.

== Economy ==
Tourism is considered the main industry of the province.

Phu Thap Boek, the highest mountain in the province, is a well-known tourist destination. The area surrounding it is the largest cabbage-growing area in Thailand.

== Transport ==
=== Road ===
Phetchabun is 346 kilometres from Bangkok by using Highway 1 and Highway 21.

=== Air ===
Phetchabun is served by Phetchabun Airport. Nok Air has served the airport with flights to Bangkok.

== Administrative divisions ==
Map of 11 districts

=== Provincial government ===
The province is divided into 11 districts (amphoe). These are further divided into 117 subdistricts (tambon) and 1261 villages (muban).

1. Mueang Phetchabun
2. Chon Daen
3. Lom Sak
4. Lom Kao
5. Wichian Buri
6. Si Thep
7. Nong Phai
8. Bueng Sam Phan
9. Nam Nao
10. Wang Pong
11. Khao Kho

=== Local government ===
As of 26 November 2019, there are: one Phetchabun Provincial Administration Organisation (ongkan borihan suan changwat) and 25 municipal (thesaban) areas in the province. Phetchabun, Wichian Buri and Lom Sak have town (thesaban mueang) status. Further 22 subdistrict municipalities (thesaban tambon). The non-municipal areas are administered by 102 Subdistrict Administrative Organisations - SAO (ongkan borihan suan tambon).

== Human achievement index 2022 ==
Health	Education	Employment	Income
43	68	12	47
Housing	Family	Transport	Participation
28	44	41	47
Province Phetchabun, with an HAI 2022 value of 0.6337 is "somewhat low", occupies place 47 in the ranking.

Since 2003, United Nations Development Programme (UNDP) in Thailand has tracked progress on human development at sub-national level using the Human achievement index (HAI), a composite index covering all the eight key areas of human development. National Economic and Social Development Board (NESDB) has taken over this task since 2017.

Rank	Classification
1 - 13	"high"
14 - 29	"somewhat high"
30 - 45	"average"
46 - 61	"somewhat low"
62 - 77	"low"

Map with provinces and HAI 2022 rankings

== Local products ==
- Sweet tamarind
- Arabica coffee
- Khao lam (sticky rice in bamboo)
- Black galingale
- Stevia tea
- Thai vermicelli rice noodles
- Cabbage
- Poultry
- Tobacco

== Notable people ==
- Saensak Muangsurin (b. 1950–2009), boxer
- Khaosai Galaxy (b. 1959), boxer, member of the International Boxing Hall of Fame
- Kaokor Galaxy (b. 1959), boxer
- Chana Porpaoin (b. 1966), boxer
- Songkram Porpaoin (b. 1966), boxer
- Sujin Naknayom (b. 1979), footballer
- Chakrit Buathong (b. 1985), footballer
- Sittisak Tarapan (b. 1984), footballer

== Gallery ==
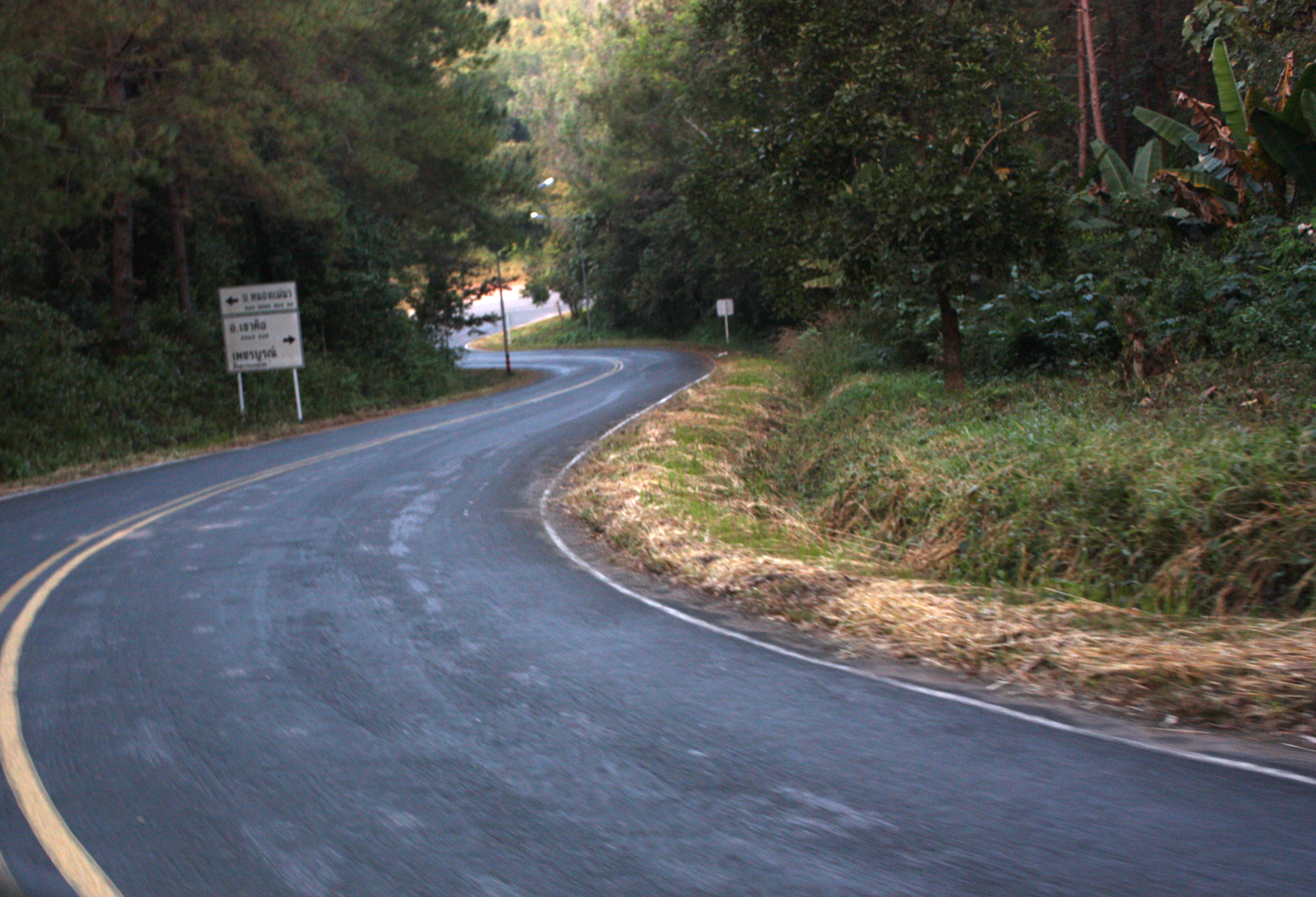
Road to Khao Kho

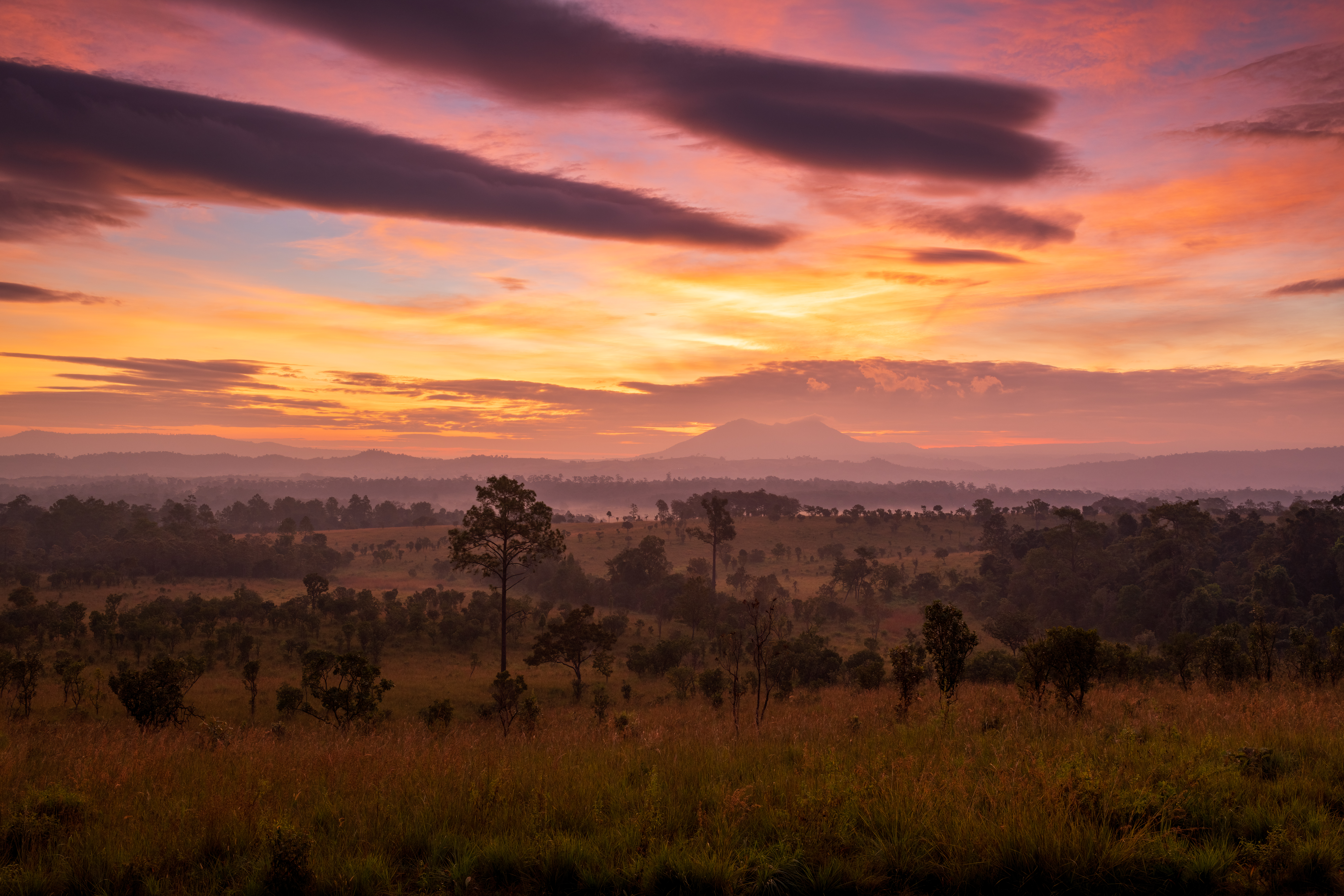
Sala Dusita
sunrise viewpoint of Thung Salaeng Luang
