= Phu Suan Sai National Park =

National park in Thailand

- IUCN category II (national park)
- Tat Hueang waterfall

- Park location in Thailand
- Location: Thailand
- Nearest city: Loei
- Coordinates: 17.51°N 100.96°E
- Area: 117 km^{2} (45 sq mi)
- Established: 1994
- Governing body: Department of National Parks, Wildlife and Plant Conservation

Phu Suan Sai National Park is a national park in Loei province, Thailand. The park is home to waterfalls, tropical rain forest, mountains and rock formations.

== Geography ==
Phu Suan Sai National Park is in Na Haeo district of Loei province. It is about 120 km (70 mi) west of the provincial capital Loei. The park's area is 117 km^{2} (45 sq mi), with an elevation range of 600–1,400 m (2,000–4,600 ft). The Mekong river is on the park's northern side, across from Laos.

== Attractions ==
Park waterfalls include Khing waterfall, with five tiers; Tat Pha waterfall 60 m (200 ft) high; and Tat Hueang waterfall 50 m (160 ft) high. Hin Si Thit is a rock formation, locally considered sacred and a site of pilgrimage.

== Fauna ==
The park hosts animals including tiger, lemur, serow, dhole, common muntjac, sambar deer, mouse deer and palm civet. Birds in the park include great hornbill, ashy drongo, bulbul, barbet, koel, tailorbird, red junglefowl and sunbird. Other bird species include short-tailed parrotbill, rufous-throated fulvetta and blue-naped pitta.
