= Gossea =

Gossea may refer to:

- Gossea (cnidarian), a genus of hydrozoans in the family Olindiidae
- Gossea, a genus of amphipods in the family Calliopiidae, synonym of Apherusa
- Gossea, a genus of worms in the family Neogosseidae, synonym of Neogossea
