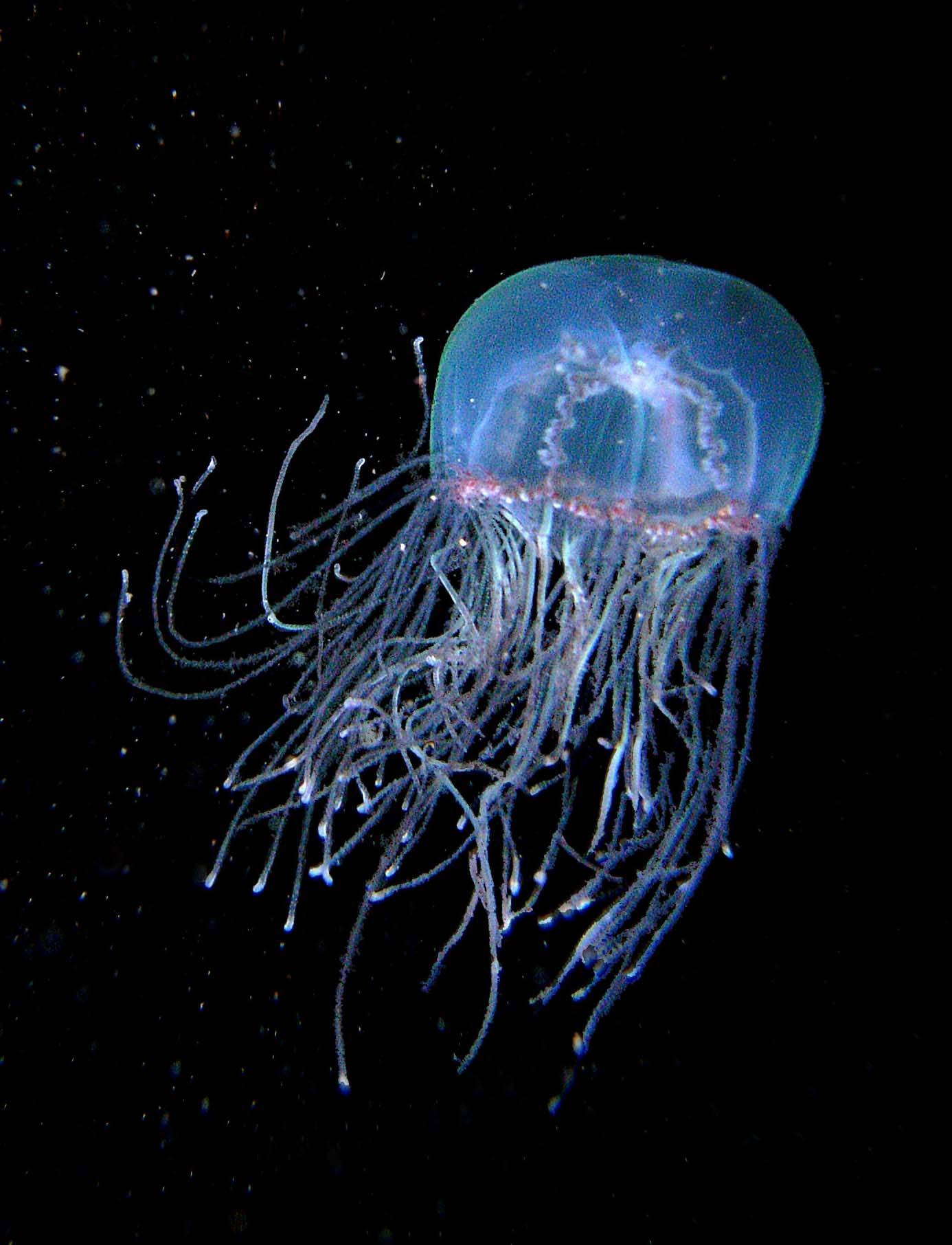

Scientific classification
- Kingdom: Animalia
- Phylum: Cnidaria
- Class: Hydrozoa
- Order: Limnomedusae
- Family: Olindiidae
- Genus: Olindias
- Species: O. phosphorica

Binomial name
- Olindias phosphorica (Delle Chiaje, 1841)

Synonyms
- Olindias muelleri Graeffe, 1884

= Olindias phosphorica =

Species of hydrozoan

Olindias phosphorica (syn. Olindias muelleri), or cigar jellyfish, is a species of hydrozoan from the central and eastern Atlantic and the Mediterranean Sea. The Mediterranean sea is a predominantly warm body of water, thus O. phosphorica is a warm-water Jellyfish. Global warming has facilitated the proliferation of the species throughout the Mediterranean sea.

== Feeding ==
A Cigar Jellyfish's diet consists of plankton mostly.

== Size ==
Their umbrellas grow up to 8 centimeter, have 100-120 secondary tentacles and 30-60 primary tentacles. Their stings do not cause much damage.
