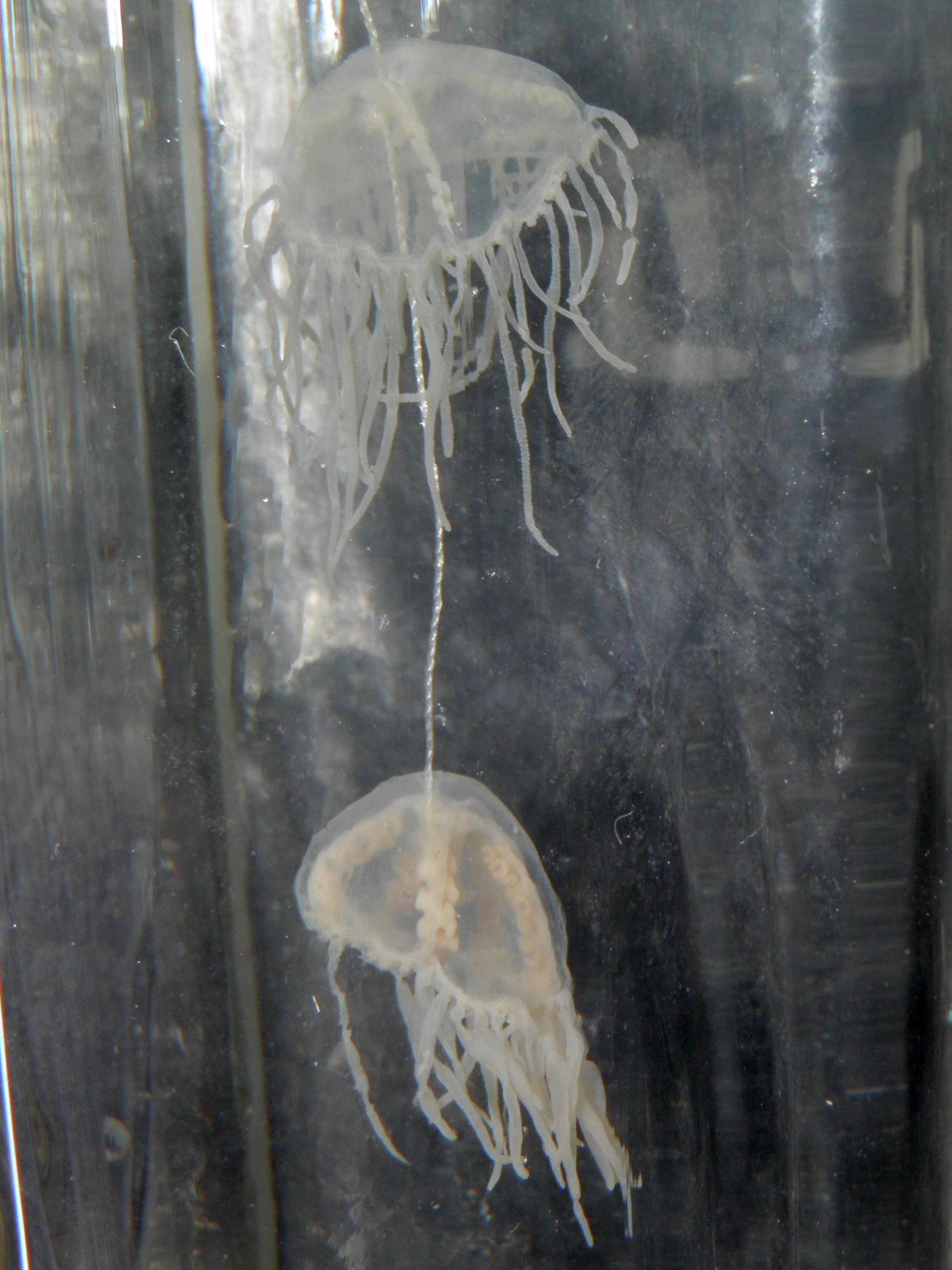
- Two Gonionemus vertens medusae

Scientific classification
- Kingdom: Animalia
- Phylum: Cnidaria
- Class: Hydrozoa
- Order: Limnomedusae
- Family: Olindiidae
- Genus: Gonionemus
- Species: G. vertens

Binomial name
- Gonionemus vertens A. Agassiz, 1862

= Gonionemus vertens =

Species of hydrozoan

Gonionemus vertens, the clinging jellyfish, is a small species of hydrozoan in the family Olindiidae found in coastal regions throughout large parts of the Northern Hemisphere.

== Description and behavior ==
The appearance of Gonionemus vertens is usually described as having a transparent bell lined with 60–80 (exceptionally up to 100–110) tentacles. The gonads are distinctly colored orange, red or violet if the specimen is female, or yellow-brown if it is male. The gonads are arranged hanging from four radial canals so that when viewed from above, the gonads are lined perpendicularly. The manubrium, colored tan, hangs down in the middle. The bell of the jellyfish (medusae) is only 1–3 cm (0.4–1.2 in) in diameter, exceptionally up to 4 cm (1.6 in), and when fully extended a tentacle can be twice the length of the bell diameter.

The medusae reproduce sexually and the tens of thousands of eggs and sperm are released into the sea. They become planula larvae that eventually attach themselves to the seabed on algae, rocks or shells as tiny polyps that measure up to 1–2 mm (0.04–0.08 in). The polyps can split into several by budding. The change from polyp to tiny medusae, initially measuring only 1.5 mm (0.06 in), typically happens when the water surpasses 17–18 °C (63–64 °F). Because of this, the medusae follow an annual pattern and first appear in the spring or later depending on temperature, sometimes causing sudden blooms where many show up at once. The medusae stage generally lasts no more than three months, but the species can live for years in the polyp stage.

During the day the medusae will attach themselves with the adhesive patches on their tentacles to various surfaces, especially seagrass, earning the species its common name clinging jellyfish. Gonionemus vertens may catch prey when attached to surfaces during the day, but they mostly feed at night in open water, eating zooplanktonic organisms like fish larvae and tiny crustaceans.

== Distribution ==
Gonionemus vertens is a marine and brackish species from shallow coastal waters of the north Pacific region, but there is considerable uncertainty about its exact native distribution. It certainly includes the northwest Pacific from the Russian Far East to Japan. Some authorities also include areas south to Vietnam in its native range, and the northeast Pacific from the Aleutian Islands to Puget Sound (the type locality), while others consider these as non-native introductions. Its northwest Atlantic range off Maine and Massachusetts might be native, but most regard this as a non-native introduction. In the northwest Atlantic there are occasional records south to New Jersey.

Regardless of its exact native range, its small size and polyp stage means that it has been spread to some parts of the world where certainly non-native, becoming an invasive species. In Europe where the species is non-native, they have been found locally in the Mediterranean Sea, and along the Atlantic coast from Portugal to Norway and Sweden. Other non-native records are from northern and southern California, the Dry Tortugas in Florida and near Mar del Plata in Argentina, with the last being the only known locality in the Southern Hemisphere.

== Sting ==
In much of its range, Gonionemus vertens has a strong sting, which can cause pain, a swollen throat, chest tightness, muscle cramps, neuropsychiatric changes and anaphylactic shock. Stinging incidents have been reported from East Asia (at least Japan and Russia), Europe and the Atlantic coast of the United States. In contrast, the sting of Gonionemus vertens apparently can not be felt in its northeast Pacific range off North America where it is considered entirely harmless to humans. In the past, it was also regarded as harmless on the Atlantic coast of North America and the recent strong stings in this region possibly is the result of introductions of the Asian form of the species. As a consequence of this variation in the sting and minor geographic variations in the morphology, some speculate that Gonionemus vertens as presently defined is a species complex.
