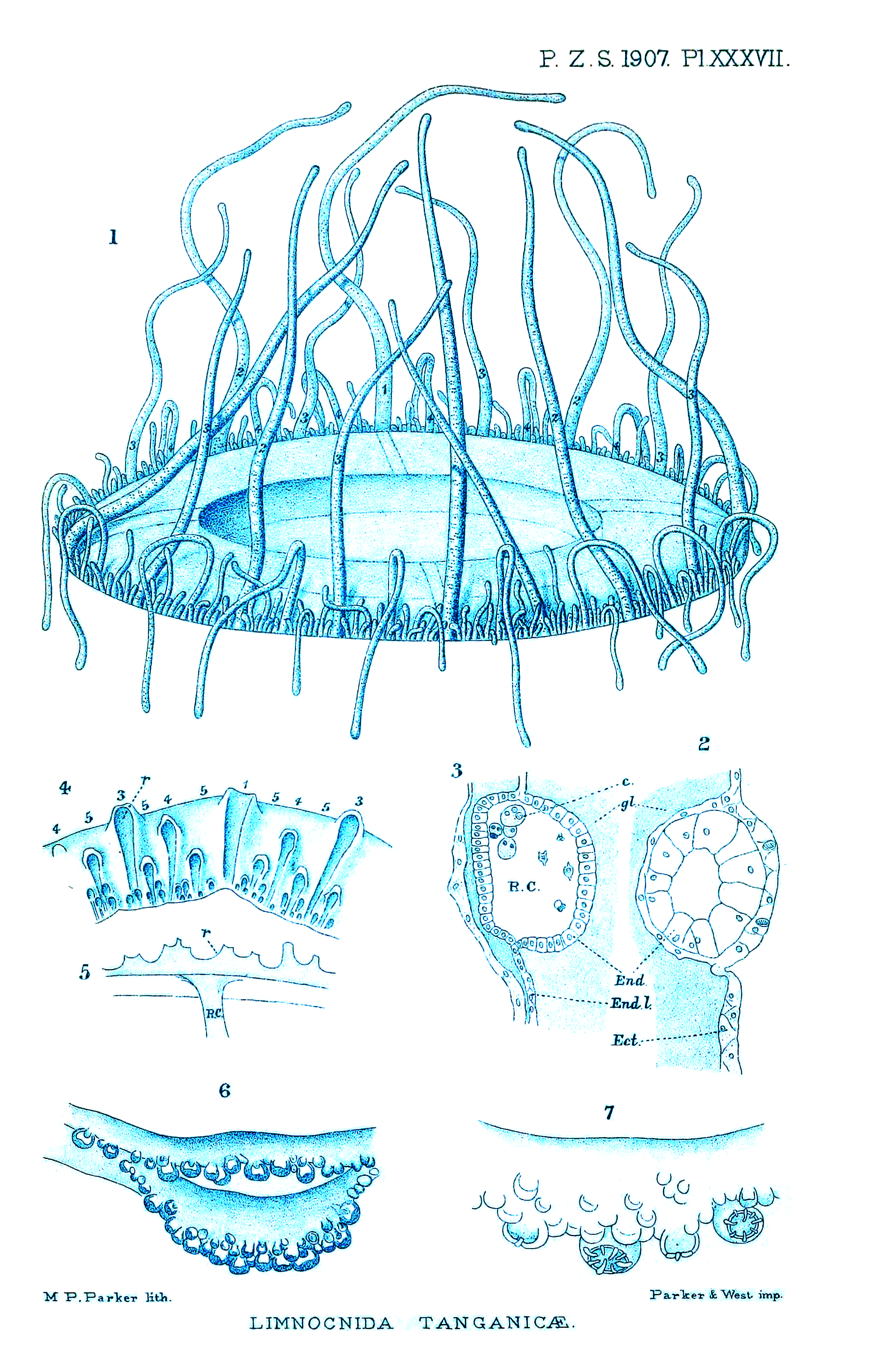

Scientific classification
- Kingdom: Animalia
- Phylum: Cnidaria
- Class: Hydrozoa
- Order: Limnomedusae
- Family: Olindiidae
- Genus: Limnocnida
- Species: L. tanganjicae

Binomial name
- Limnocnida tanganjicae Günther, 1893

Synonyms
- L. tanganyicae

= Limnocnida tanganjicae =

Species of hydrozoan

Limnocnida tanganjicae, the great lakes jellyfish, is a species of freshwater hydrozoan in the family Olindiidae. It is found throughout Africa at depths of between 20 cm and 100 meters.

The subspecies L. t. subsp. victoriae is accepted as Limnocnida victoriae.

== Biology ==
Medusae settle down to form pale brown or yellow hydroids at between 20 and 25 °Celsius, five days after fertilisation. The hydroid stage is usually found on stems of aquatic plants at depths of up to 5 meters. They may be found in flowing rivers, but are much more abundant in still, clear lakes. Horizontal migration takes places between 10 am and 3 pm, usually in the opposite direction to the wind. Blooms can reach up to 3,000 medusae per cubic meter.

It was found that at night the median depth is 13 meters, and 21 m at noon.

== Description ==
Medusae are transparent or whitish, from one millimeter to over 30 mm. Specimens collected from Lake Lisikili varied in diameter, from 5 to 28 mm. No gonads were detected in any of the 347 specimens. Radial canals clearly visible, and usually 4 in number, but may be up to 7. Velum horizontal and wide. Medusae have between 80 and 560 tentacles, and 60 to 360 statocysts.

== Relationship with humans ==
Rock art of L. tanganjicae has been found in the rock shelter of Tan Zoumaitek, Central Sahara, Algeria. These artworks are approximately 8,000 years old, making them the oldest images of cnidarians currently known.
