= Vallentinia gabriellae =

Scientific classification
- Kingdom: Animalia
- Phylum: Cnidaria
- Class: Hydrozoa
- Order: Limnomedusae
- Family: Olindiidae
- Genus: Vallentinia
- Species: V. gabriellae

Binomial name
- Vallentinia gabriellae Vannucci Mendes, 1948

Species of hydrozoan

Vallentinia gabriellae, the hitch-hiking jellyfish, is a species of small, inconspicuous hydrozoan in the family Olindiidae. It is endemic to a few isolated parts of the western Atlantic Ocean. It is elusive in the wild but sometimes makes its appearance unexpectedly in seawater cultures of other organisms in the laboratory.

== Synonymy ==
Vallentinia gabriellae is found in the south west Atlantic. A related species, Vallentinia adherens, is found in the Pacific Ocean and the two are so similar that it has been suggested that they are different populations of the same species.

== Description ==
Vallentinia gabriellae can grow to about 12 millimetres (0.5 in) in diameter but is more usually 6 to 8 millimetres across. The dome-shaped bell of the medusa is two thirds as high as it is wide. It is transparent and gelatinous and has 4 radial canals. Alongside their lower ends lie 4 folded, sac-like gonads. There are 4 to 8 large tentacles halfway down the outside of the bell located between the radial canals and sometimes 4 more, close to them. These have adhesive pads on their tips which allows the jellyfish to grip hold of objects. There are up to 128 (more usually 64-75) hollow tentacles fringing the margin of the bell. These have several rings of nematocysts along their length. Between the tentacles are statocysts, sensory organs which can detect gravitational pull and which help the animal to orient itself correctly. Underneath the bell there is a central manubrium with the mouth at its tip. This connects to the gastrovascular cavity, the radial canals and the circular marginal canal.

== Distribution and habitat ==
Vallentinia gabriellae is found on the western side of the Atlantic Ocean. It is known from isolated sites in Brazil, the Yucatan Peninsula, Louisiana, Florida and Bimini in the Bahamas. It lives in shallow water, on or close to the seabed. In the Indian River Lagoon in Florida it was first detected in 1990, in a barrier ditch adjoining mangrove swamps. In Louisiana it was found in a seagrass bed. It has been found experimentally to be tolerant of a wide range of salinities and a wide range of temperatures.

== Life cycle ==
Reproduction in Vallentinia gabriellae has two phases. These are the medusa or jellyfish which reproduces sexually and a polyp that reproduces by budding. The male and female medusae liberate gametes into the water column. After fertilisation, the eggs develop into planula larvae which are planktonic. After some time drifting with the current, they settle onto the seabed, undergo metamorphosis and become sedentary. The smallest polyps that form, under 1 millimetre (0.04 in) long, have 2 tentacles while older, larger ones have 3 to 5. The polyps can reproduce asexually, budding to form either more polyps or free-swimming medusae. A polyp can have several buds forming at any one time. Polyps can also bud to produce frustules. These are groups of about 4 polyps embedded in mucus and capable of withstanding adverse circumstances. When conditions improve they can develop into new polyps over the course of a few weeks.

== Ecology ==
On several occasions, specimens of Vallentinia gabriellae have unexpectedly appeared in cultures of other marine organisms in the laboratory. The ease with which they can be cultured (fed on brine shrimps (Artemia salina)) has led to the possibility of their being used for teaching purposes and in medical research.

Knowledge of this species mostly comes from observations in the laboratory because they have only infrequently been found in the wild. In a feeding trial, specimens of Vallentinia gabriellae were deprived of food for 48 hours and then offered a choice of rotifers, copepods, nematodes, crab zoeal larvae and gastropod veliger larvae. They preferred larger items of prey which they immobilised with their nematocysts before ingesting them whole. They continued feeding until replete. Other unfed jellyfish were offered juvenile fish (mullet) ranging in size from 12 to 15 millimetres in length, larger than the 10 millimetre diameter of the jellyfish. These were entangled and immobilised by the marginal tentacles, eventually being wrapped round and enclosed by the mobile manubrium. Undigested remains were expelled the following day.
