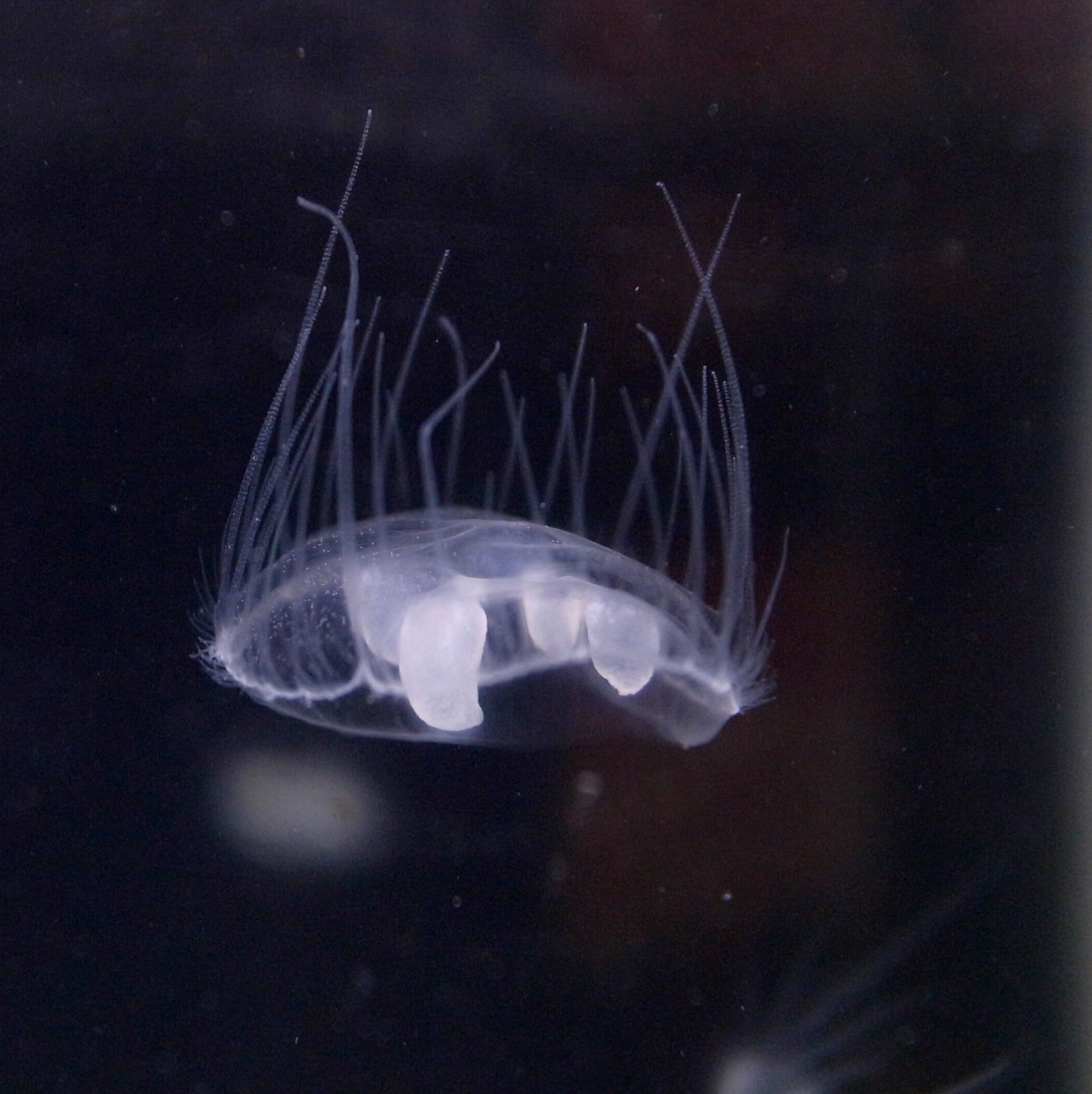

Conservation status
- Secure (NatureServe)

Scientific classification
- Kingdom: Animalia
- Phylum: Cnidaria
- Class: Hydrozoa
- Order: Limnomedusae
- Family: Olindiidae
- Genus: Craspedacusta
- Species: C. sowerbii

Binomial name
- Craspedacusta sowerbii Lankester, 1880

Synonyms
- Craspedacusta sowerbyi Lankester, 1880 [lapsus]; Limnocodium victoria Allman, 1880; Microhydra ryderi Potts, 1885; Limnocodium kawaii Okaa, 1907; Craspedacusta kawaii (Oka, 1907); Microhydra germanica Roch, 1924; Craspedacusta kuoi Shieh & Y. H. M. Wang, 1959; Craspedacusta sowerbii yongkangensis Wang & Xu, 2004

= Craspedacusta sowerbii =

Species of jellyfish

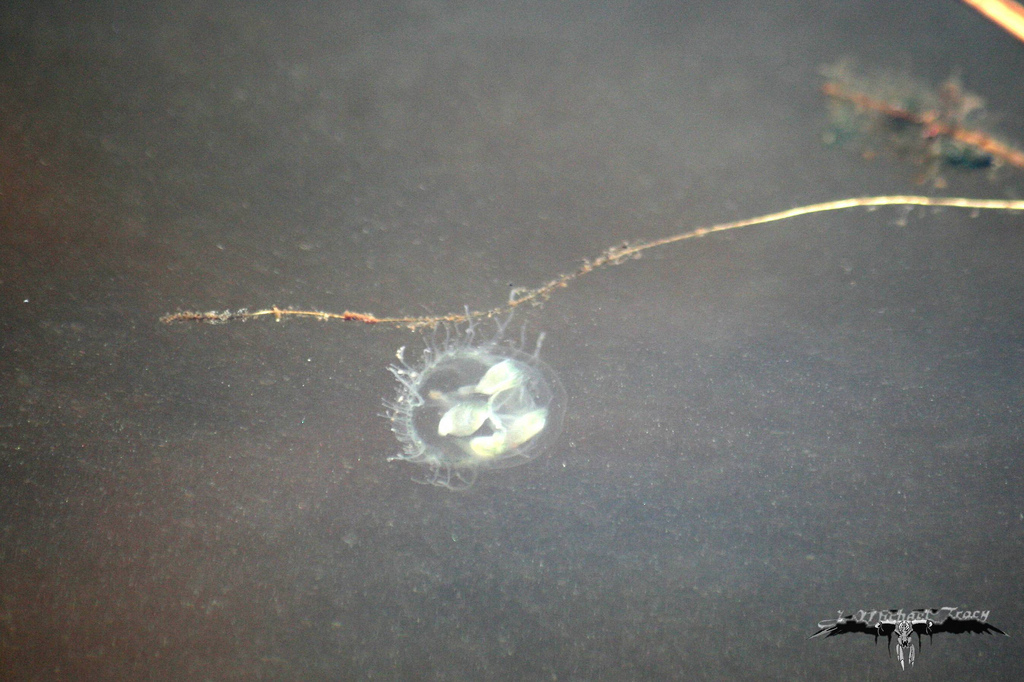
A specimen in a farming pond (Upstate New York).

Craspedacusta sowerbii, the peach blossom jellyfish or freshwater jellyfish, is a species of freshwater hydrozoan jellyfish, or hydromedusa cnidarian. Hydromedusan jellyfish differ from scyphozoan jellyfish because they have a muscular, shelf-like structure called a velum on the ventral surface, attached to the bell margin. Originally from the Yangtze basin in China, C. sowerbii is an introduced species now found throughout the world in bodies of fresh water.

== Taxonomy ==
Craspedacusta sowerbii was first formally described in 1880 by the British zoologist Ray Lankester. The type series of medusae was collected by William Sowerby from a tank holding Victoria amazonica in the tropical plant house at the Royal Botanic Society's garden in Regent's Park. Sowerby sent specimens to some acquaintances, including Lankester and George Allman, Lankester publishes his description in Nature, placing the new species in the new genus Craspedacusta. Allman read a spoken description to the Linnean Society, naming the species Limnocodium victoria. After some discussion, Sowerby and Allman agreed to name the species Limnocodiun sowerbii, but in 1910 Lankester's name was restored. All of the specimens Lankester had examined from Regent's Park were male.

Around this time, Edward Potts discovered very small freshwater hydras in Philadelphia which he named Microhydra ryderi in 1897, which were soon realised to be the polyps of a freshwater medusa similar to C. sowerbyi. It was not until 1928 that Charles L. Boulenger and W. U. Flower confrmed that M. ryderi was the polyp of C. sowerbyi. C. sowerbii is the type species of its genus, which is included in the family Olindiidae in the order Limnomedusae in the class Hydrozoa.

== Form ==
C. sowerbii medusae are about 20–25 mm (approximately 1 in.) in diameter, somewhat flatter than a hemisphere, and very delicate when fully grown. They have a whorl of up to 400 tentacles tightly packed around the bell margin. Hanging down from the center of the inside of the bell is a large stomach structure called a manubrium, with a mouth-opening with four frilly lips. Circulation of nutrients is facilitated by four radial canals which originate at the edges of the stomach (manubrium), and which are also connected to a ring canal, located near the bell margin. Most of the body is transparent or translucent, with a whitish or greenish tinge. The (usually) four large flat sex organs (gonads) are attached to the four radial canals, and are usually opaque white. The many tentacles each contain thousands of cells called cnidocytes, which contain nematocysts (also known as cnidocysts), and are used to capture prey and pass it to the mouth. Food is taken in the mouth opening, and waste is expelled out of the same opening.

== Habitat and distribution ==
C. sowerbii is native to the Yangtze basin in China, but has been introduced on every continent except for Antarctica.

It is usually found in calm, freshwater reservoirs, lakes, impoundments, gravel pits or quarries. It has also been seen in slow-moving backwaters of river systems such as the Allegheny River, Ohio River and Tennessee River in the United States, and the Wang Thong River of Thailand. It is not generally seen in fast flowing streams or rivers.

The medusa's appearance is sporadic and unpredictable from year to year. It is not uncommon for C. sowerbii to appear in a body of water where it had never been documented before, in very large numbers, and its appearance may even be reported on the local news.

=== Asia ===
Since 2008 the freshwater jellyfish have been sighted every September and October in the Zhaojiaya Reservoir near Zhangjiajie, Hunan, China.

It has been found in the Cauvery River and backwaters of the Hemavathi River in Karnataka, India.

It is also found in the Bang Rachan rapids forest on the Khek River, the upstream of the Wang Thong River in Khao Kho District, Phetchabun Province, where it is the provincial aquatic life. Freshwater jellyfish can only be seen around early March to May, which is the summer.

=== Australia ===
It has been found in water reservoirs and artificial lakes in south-eastern Australia, including the Thorndon Park reservoir and Lake Burley Griffin.

=== Europe ===
During the abnormal heat in the summer 2010 in Russia sightings of C. sowerbii were reported in the Moscow River.

It has been found in several lakes in Hungary.

They also live in Lake Geneva between Switzerland and France.

In the summer of 2026 on the lake Savsko at the Ada Ciganlija that is located at the city of Belgrade, Serbia a lot of freshwater jelly fish were found swimming. No one really knows where they came from.

In November 2026 it was found in a reservoir in Catalunya, northen Spain. [ ]

=== North America ===
C. sowerbii was identified in 1964 in the Madawaska River, a tributary of the Ottawa River, in Ontario, Canada. It is now found throughout the Ottawa river watershed in many streams and lakes.

On August 21, 2010, C. sowerbii was spotted and captured on the northwest corner of Falcon Lake in Manitoba, Canada. Scientists believe this was due to a heat wave in the Whiteshell Provincial Park area. It is proposed the C. sowerbii came to Falcon Lake on waterfowl originating from Star Lake, Manitoba, Canada. Falcon Lake along with Star Lake remain the only two confirmed sightings of C. sowerbii in Manitoba. It has been found in British Columbia in 34 lakes as far north as Cache Creek and Port Hardy.

C. sowerbii has been seen in Pennsylvanian lakes and reservoirs including Marsh Creek Lake, Downingtown/Eagle, PA Turnpike/Rt 100/Rt 401, SR 282 (2007, 2008). Populations are also known to exist in several lakes in Minnesota.

C. sowerbii was found and collected by the Sternberg Museum of Natural History in Melvern Lake in Kansas in 2020.

In July 2022, a population was discovered in a pond at Shawnee Park in Louisville, Kentucky.

In July 2025, a single jellyfish was discovered at Presque Isle State Park in Erie, Pennsylvania. In August, several more individuals were reported from Presque Isle State Park using the citizen science app iNaturalist. Later that same August, several individuals were sighted near Put-in-Bay, Ohio. In July 2026 they were spotted again at Presque Isle State Park in Erie, Pennsylvania.

=== South and Central America ===
It was reported in Panama in 1925, Chile in 1942, Argentina in 1950, Brazil in 1963, and in Uruguay in 1971.

== Feeding ==
C. sowerbii is a predator on zooplankton including daphnia and copepods. Prey is caught with their stinging tentacles. Drifting with its tentacles extended, the jelly waits for suitable prey to touch a tentacle. Once contact has been made, nematocysts on the tentacle fire into the prey, injecting venom which paralyzes the animal, and the tentacle itself coils around the prey. The tentacles then bring the prey into the mouth, where it is released and then digested.

Like saltwater jellyfish, they have stinging cells. However, these cnidocyte cells are used for paralyzing very tiny prey and have not been proven to have the capacity to pierce human skin.

== Life cycle ==
C. sowerbii begins life as a tiny polyp, which lives in colonies attached to underwater vegetation, rocks, or tree stumps, feeding and asexually reproducing during spring and summer. Some of these offspring are the sexually reproducing medusae. Fertilized eggs develop into small ciliated larvae called planulae. The planulae then settle to the bottom and develop into polyps. However, the majority of C. sowerbii populations existing in the United States are either all male or all-female, so there is no sexual reproduction in those populations.

During the cold winter months, polyps contract and enter dormancy as resting bodies called podocysts. It is believed that podocysts are transported by aquatic plants or animals to other bodies of water. Once conditions become favorable, they develop into polyps again.
