= Scolionema =

Scolionema may refer to:

- Scolionema (cnidarian), a genus of hydrozoans in the family Olindiidae
- Scolionema (fungus), a genus of fungi in the family Parodiopsidaceae
