= Thorndon Park Reserve =

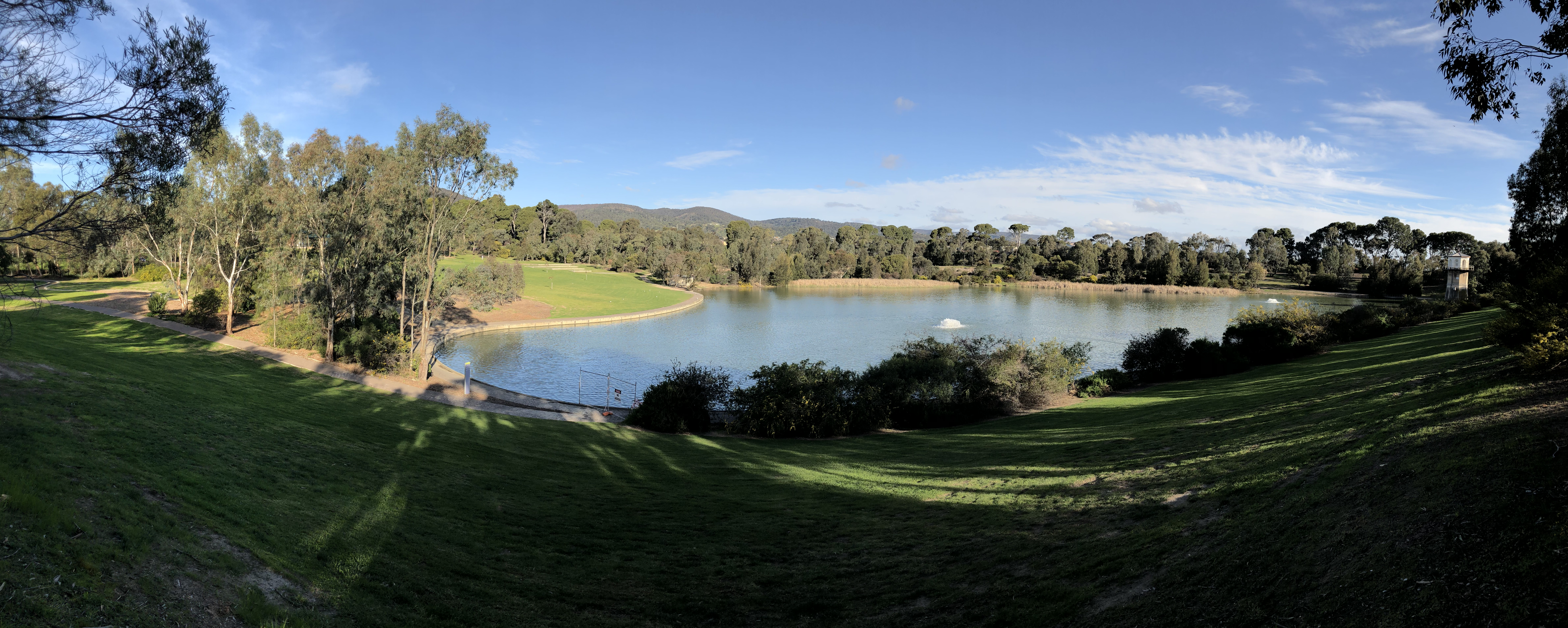
- The park and reservoir in 2018

- Location within Greater Adelaide
- Interactive map of Thorndon Park Reserve
- Type: Public park
- Location: Paradise, South Australia
- Nearest city: Adelaide
- Coordinates: 34°52′28″S 138°41′18″E
- Created: c. 1980s
- Operator: Campbelltown City Council
- Status: Open all year
- Thorndon Park Reservoir
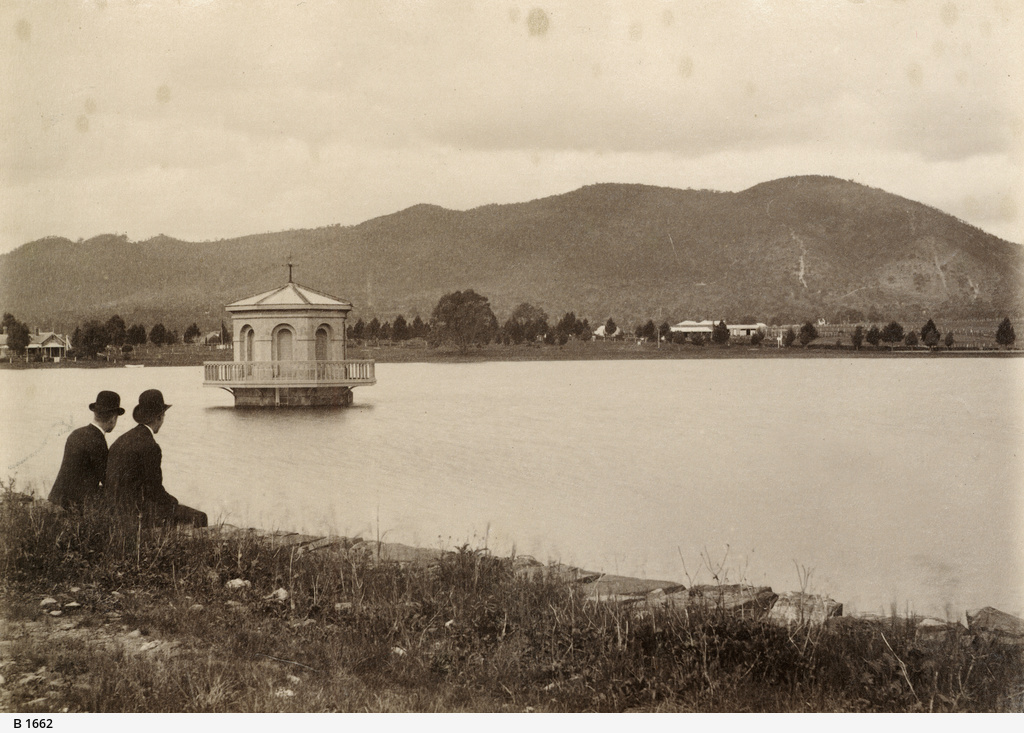
- Thorndon Park Reservoir, 1899
- Purpose: Water supply
- Status: Decommissioned
- Construction began: 1857
- Opening date: 1860
- Demolition date: 1986

Dam and spillways
- Type of dam: Earth fill dam
- Height: 13 m (42 ft)
- Width (crest): 1.5 m (5 ft)
- Width (base): 3.0 m (10 ft)

Reservoir
- Total capacity: 650 ML (530 acre⋅ft)
- Surface area: 10.7 ha (26.5 acres)
- Maximum water depth: 12 m (40 ft)

Thorndon Park Reserve is a public park in the Adelaide suburb of Paradise, South Australia. It was originally the site of the Thorndon Park reservoir, which was completed in 1860. The reserve became accessible to the public for recreational use in 1986. It was redesigned in the 2000s and as of 2015 improvement works are ongoing.

The reserve has picnic areas, barbecues, play equipment for children, large grassy areas, wheelchair-friendly walking paths, an amphitheatre, waterways and a terraced series of ponds and wetlands which support diverse native flora and fauna. In 2014, the prospect of establishing a community orchard within the Thorndon Park Reserve was considered. Dogs are not permitted in the park.

== Thorndon Park reservoir ==
The Thorndon Park reservoir was the first reservoir built to supply the township of Adelaide. It was under construction between 1857 and 1859 and was completed in 1860. At full capacity, the reservoir held 650 megalitres (142,000,000 imp gal) of water. The reservoir continued to be used until 1977 when structural safety concerns with the reservoir wall resulted in it being closed.

In 1950 the tiny African freshwater jellyfish Craspedacusta sowerbii was found in the reservoir.

== See also ==
- List of Adelaide parks and gardens
- List of reservoirs and dams in South Australia
