= Microcotyle toba =

Scientific classification
- Kingdom: Animalia
- Phylum: Platyhelminthes
- Class: Monogenea
- Order: Mazocraeidea
- Family: Microcotylidae
- Genus: Microcotyle
- Species: M. toba

Binomial name
- Microcotyle toba Ishii & Sawada, 1938

Synonyms
- Microcotyle (Microcotyle) toba (Ishii & Sawada, 1938) Unnithan, 1971; Paramicrocotyle toba (Ishii & Sawada, 1938) Caballero & Bravo-Hollis, 1972

Species of worms

Microcotyle toba is a species of monogenean, parasitic on the gills of a marine fish. It belongs to the family Microcotylidae.

== Systematics ==
Microcotyle toba was first described by Ishii & Sawada in 1938 as Microcotyla toba. The original description of this worm was in Japanese. In 1938, Ishii & Sawada published an English descriptions of this species.

In 1971, Microcotyle toba was included in the subgenus Microcotyle as Microcotyle (Microcotyle) toba. This species was transferred by Caballero & Bravo-Hollis to the genus Paramicrocotyle as Paramicrocotyle toba. Mamaev, in his revision of the family Microcotylidae, suppressed this combination, reassigned the species to the genus Microcotyle as Microcotyle toba and considered Paramicrocotyle a junior subjective synonym of Microcotyle.

== Morphology ==
Microcotyle toba has the general morphology of all species of Microcotyle, with a symmetrical spindel-shaped body, and comprising an anterior part which contains most organs and a posterior part called the haptor. The haptor is narrow, not well delineated from body proper, and bears 23 pairs of clamps. The clamps of the haptor attach the animal to the gill of the fish. There are also two oval anterior buccal suckers placed ventrolaterally in the buccal cavity. The digestive organs include an anterior, terminal mouth, a small oval muscular pharynx, a very short oesophagus and a posterior intestine with two lateral branches provided with many ramifications which enters the vitellaria. Each adult contains male and female reproductive organs. The reproductive organs include an anterior genital atrium armed with numerous conical pointed slightly recurved spines, a dorsal vagina, a single S-shaped ovary, 25-30 of follicular testes which are postovarian and situated in the intercecal field.

== Diagnosis ==
According to Ishii & Sawada, Microcotyle toba is most closely related to Microcotyle hiatulae, it can be distinguished from it by the number of testes, shape of ovary and of intestine, and measurements.

== Etymology ==
The specific epithet toba refers to Toba, the type-locality of Microcotyle toba.

== Hosts and localities ==
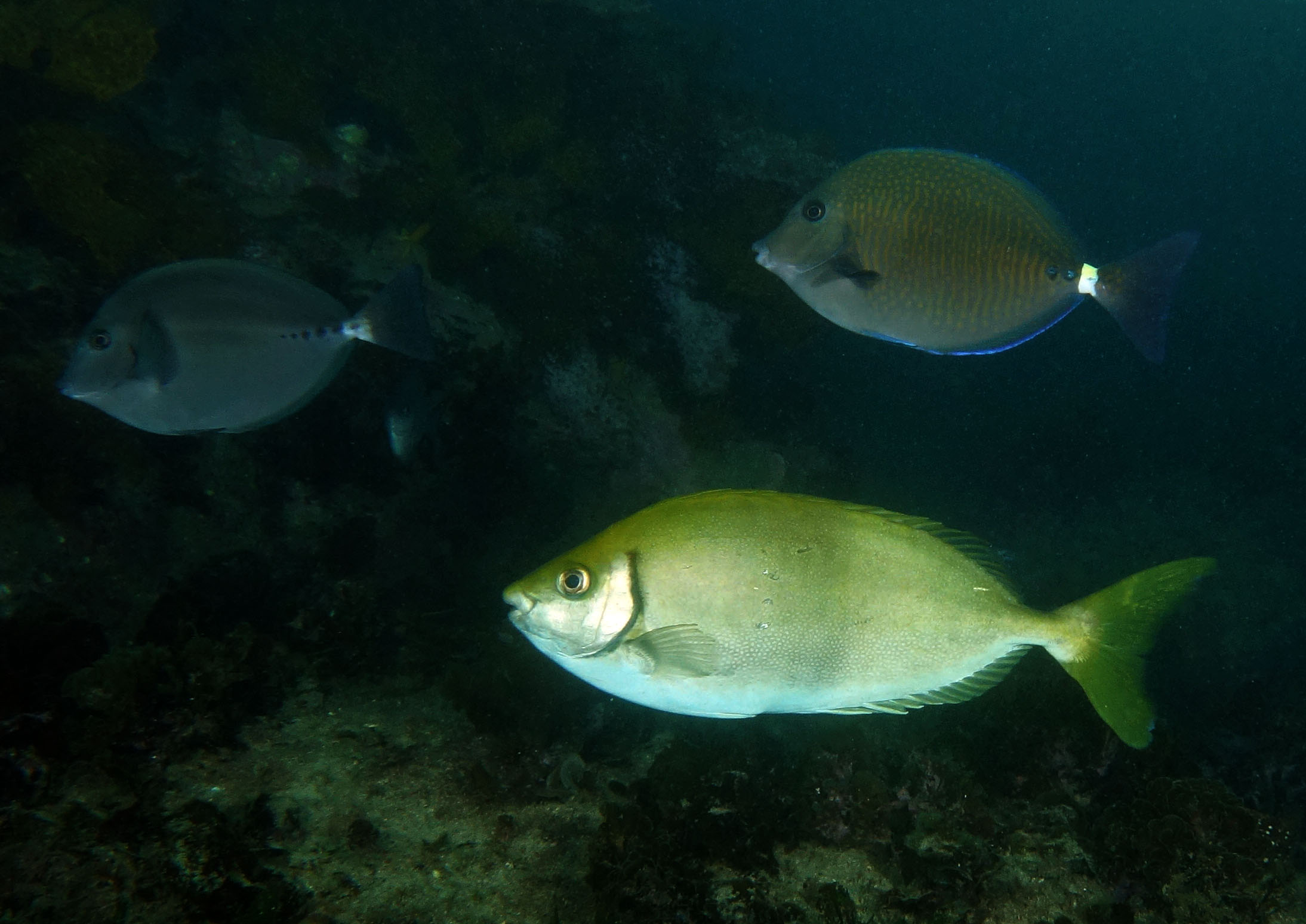
The mottled spinefoot Siganus fuscescens is the type-host of Microcotyle toba

The type-host of Microcotyle toba is the mottled spinefoot Siganus fuscescens (Siganidae). The type-locality is Toba, Japan.
