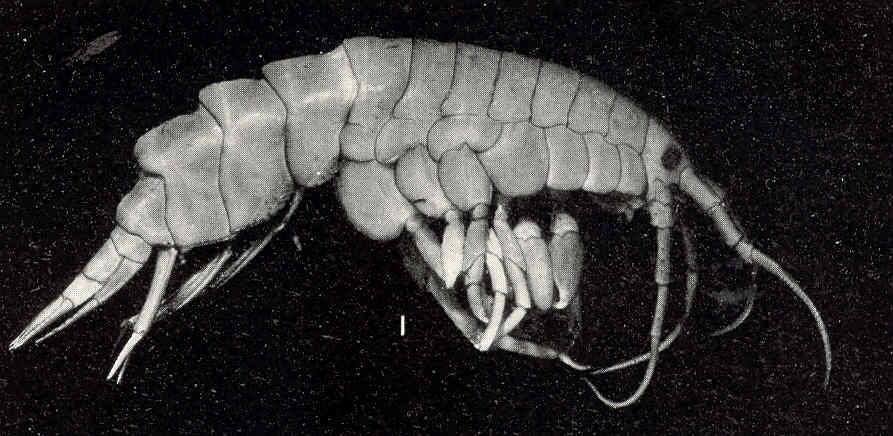

Scientific classification
- Domain: Eukaryota
- Kingdom: Animalia
- Phylum: Arthropoda
- Class: Malacostraca
- Order: Amphipoda
- Family: Calliopiidae
- Genus: Calliopius
- Species: C. laeviusculus

Binomial name
- Calliopius laeviusculus (Krøyer, 1838)

= Calliopius laeviusculus =

Species of crustacean

Calliopius laeviusculus is a species of amphipod in the family Calliopiidae. It is found in Europe and North America.
