= Microcotyle furcata =

Scientific classification
- Kingdom: Animalia
- Phylum: Platyhelminthes
- Class: Monogenea
- Order: Mazocraeidea
- Family: Microcotylidae
- Genus: Microcotyle
- Species: M. furcata

Binomial name
- Microcotyle furcata Linton, 1940

Synonyms
- Microcotyle hiatulae Goto, 1899; Microcotyle (Microcotyle) furcata (Linton, 1940) Unnithan, 1971

Species of worms

Microcotyle furcata is a species of monogenean that is parasitic on the gills of a marine fish. It belongs to the family Microcotylidae.

== Systematics ==
Microcotyle furcata was described by Linton in 1940 from the gills of the labrid Hiatula Onitis collected near Woods Hole, off Massachusetts. Microcotyle hiatulae was described 40 years earlier by Goto in 1899 from the gills of the labrid Hiatula Onitis collected near Newport, off Rhode Island. Forty years later, Linton (1940) described M. furcata from the gills the same host collected near Woods Hole, off Massachusetts. As Linton did not mention M. hiatulae description of M. furcata, Thoney & Munroe suggested that Linton was unaware of Goto's earlier description of M. hiatulae. Thoney & Munroe examined Microcotyle specimens from T. onitis off Rhode Island, Massachusetts, Chesapeake Bay and indicated that all specimens collected from all three locations were indistinguishable from M. hiatulae. Comparison of meristic and morphometric of the holotype of M. furcata also reveals that this specimen are M. hiatulae indicating that Microcotyle furcata should be considered a junior subjective synonym of M. hiatulae'. Thoney & Munroe provided a redescription and illustrations of Microcotyle hiatulae to complete the original description lacking data on intraspecific variation and some important taxonomic characters, and also described the postlarval development. Thoney and Munroe's comparison of M. hiatulae with 18 other species of Microcotyle described previously from 15 host species living sympatrically with Hiatula onitis along the Atlantic coast of the United States by examination of published descriptions showed that many of the species were morphologically similar. Thoney and Munroe also noted that it was extremely difficult to identify an individual to species level in absence of host species identification.

Unnithan erected the subgenus Microcotyle in which he placed Microcotyle furcata as Microcotyle (Microcotyle) furcata. However, this species was returned to the genus Microcotyle by Mamaev.

== Description ==
Microcotyle furcata has the general morphology of all species of Microcotyle, with a symmetrical lanceolate body, comprising an anterior part which contains most organs and a posterior part called the haptor. The haptor is symmetrical, approximately half the length of the body proper and bears 40-48 clamps, arranged as two rows, one on each side. The clamps of the haptor attach the animal to the gill of the fish. There are also two buccal suckers at the anterior extremity. The digestive organs include an anterior, terminal mouth, a pharynx nearly circular in outline, a short oesophagus and a posterior intestine with two lateral branches hidden in large part by the vitellaria and do not extend in the haptor. Each adult contains male and female reproductive organs. The reproductive organs include an anterior spacious genital atrium, armed with numerous somewhat conical spines, a medio-dorsal vagina, a single ovary and 14-24 testes that extend from the posterior edge of the ovary to a point a little in front of the posterior end of the vitellaria.

== Hosts and localities ==
The type-host is Tautoga onitis (Labridae). The type-locality is off Massachusetts, in the northeastern United States.

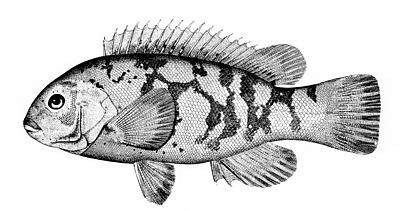
Tautoga onitis is the type host of Microcotyle furcata
