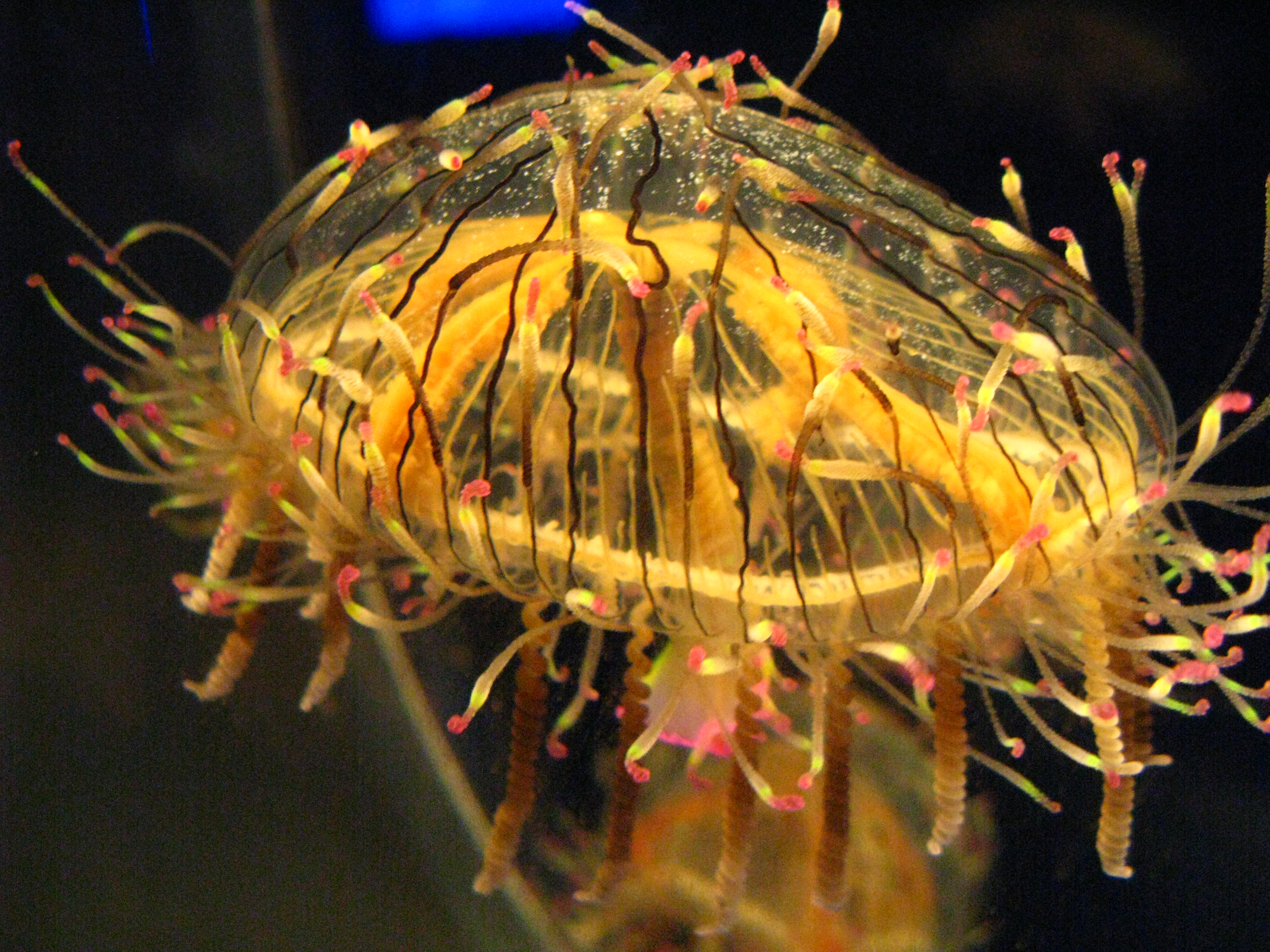
- Olindias formosa

Scientific classification
- Kingdom: Animalia
- Phylum: Cnidaria
- Class: Hydrozoa
- Order: Limnomedusae
- Family: Olindiidae
- Genus: Olindias; Müller, 1861

Species
- See text

Synonyms
- Olindioides Goto, 1903

= Olindias =

Genus of hydrozoans

Olindias is a genus of hydrozoans in the family Olindiidae.

== Characteristics ==
Members of the genus Olindias have a dome-shaped bell, four radial canals and many centripetal canals. The gonads are beside the radial canals and have characteristic papilliform processes. There are a few primary tentacles growing part way down the bell with adhesive suckers and cnidocytes in bands. There are a pair of statocysts adjoining the base of each primary tentacle. There are a much larger number of short marginal tentacles with rings of cnidocytes for immobilising prey. Between these tentacles there are a number of club-shaped processes which may develop into tentacles.

== Species ==
As of June 2024, the World Register of Marine Species currently lists the following 7 species:

- Olindias deigo (Toshino, Tanimoto & Minemizu, 2019)
- Olindias formosus (Goto, 1903) –
- Olindias malayensis (Maas, 1905)
- Olindias phosphorica (Delle Chiaje, 1841)
- Olindias sambaquiensis (Müller, 1861)
- Olindias singularis (Browne, 1905)
- Olindias tenuis (Fewkes, 1882)
