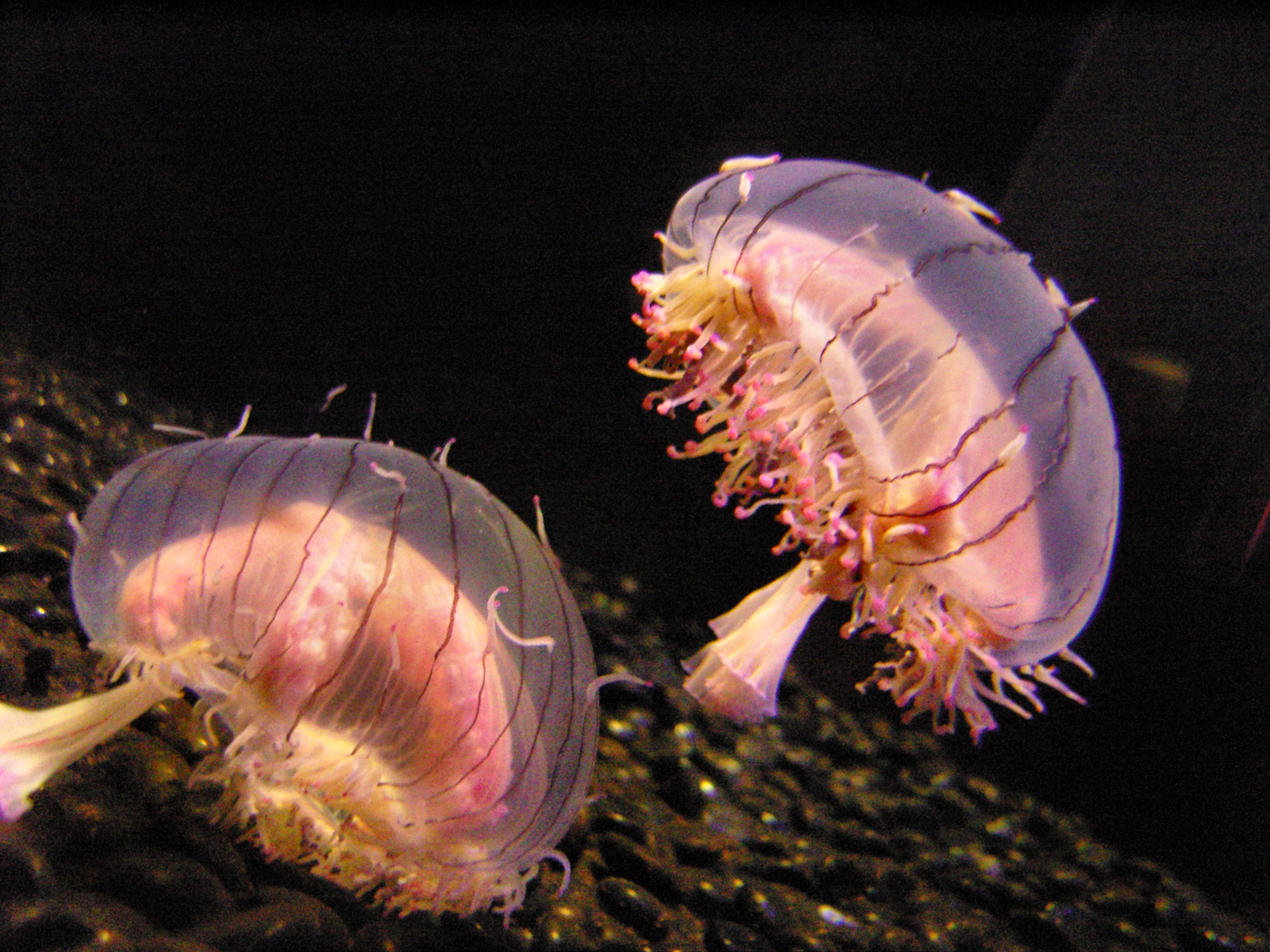

Scientific classification
- Kingdom: Animalia
- Phylum: Cnidaria
- Class: Hydrozoa
- Order: Limnomedusae
- Family: Olindiidae
- Genus: Olindias
- Species: O. formosus

Binomial name
- Olindias formosus (Goto, 1903)

Synonyms
- Olindias formosa (Goto, 1903); Olindioides formosa Goto, 1903

= Flower hat jelly =

Species of cnidarian

The flower hat jelly (Olindias formosus) is a species of hydromedusa in the hydrozoan family Olindiidae. Although they look like a jellyfish, they actually belong in the class Hydrozoa, while true jellyfish belong in class Scyphozoa. Flower hat jellies occur in the northwestern Pacific off central and southern Japan, and South Korea's Jeju Island. The adult form of the flower hat jelly only lives a few months and is typically seen from December to July, with peaks in April and May. During the day they rest on the bottom, often among rocks or algae, but at night they float up to hunt for their prey, typically small fish.

The sting of the flower hat jelly is generally mildly painful and leaves a rash. There is a single known human fatality from Japan.

== Appearance and life cycle ==
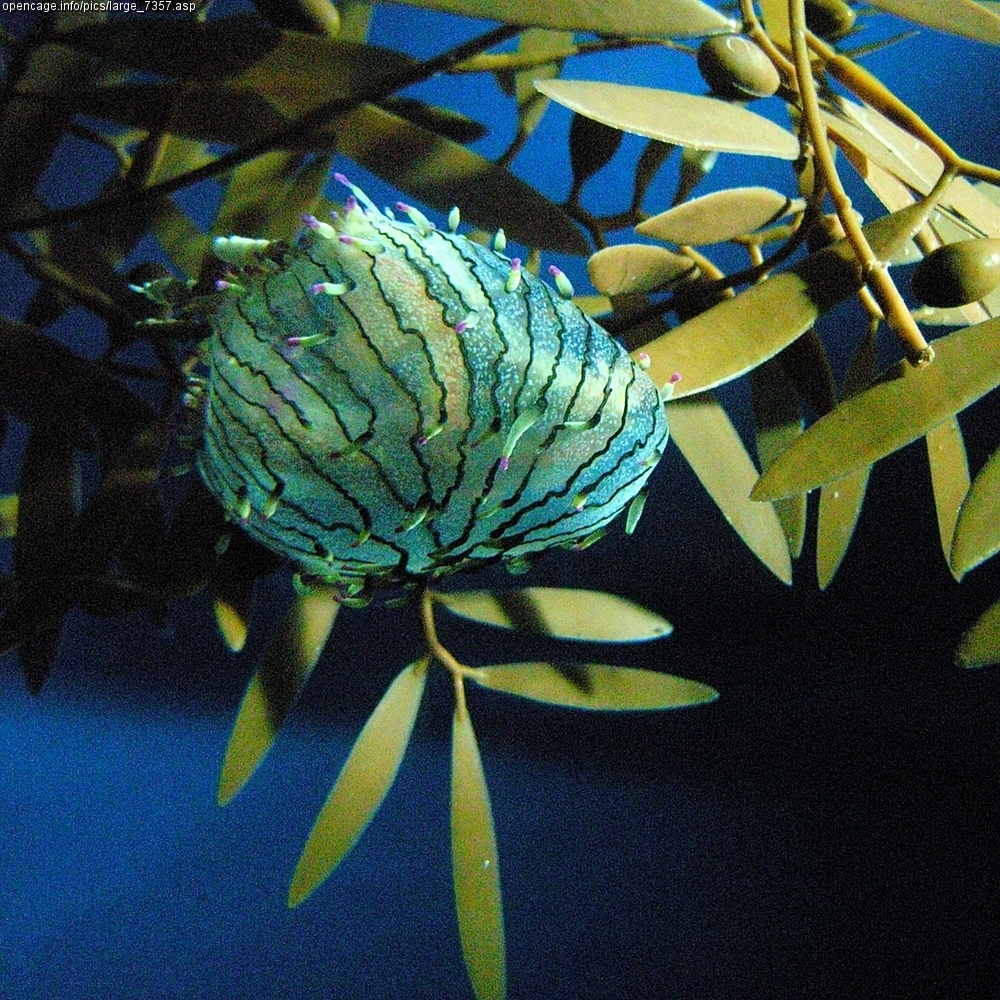
A flower hat jelly perched among algae

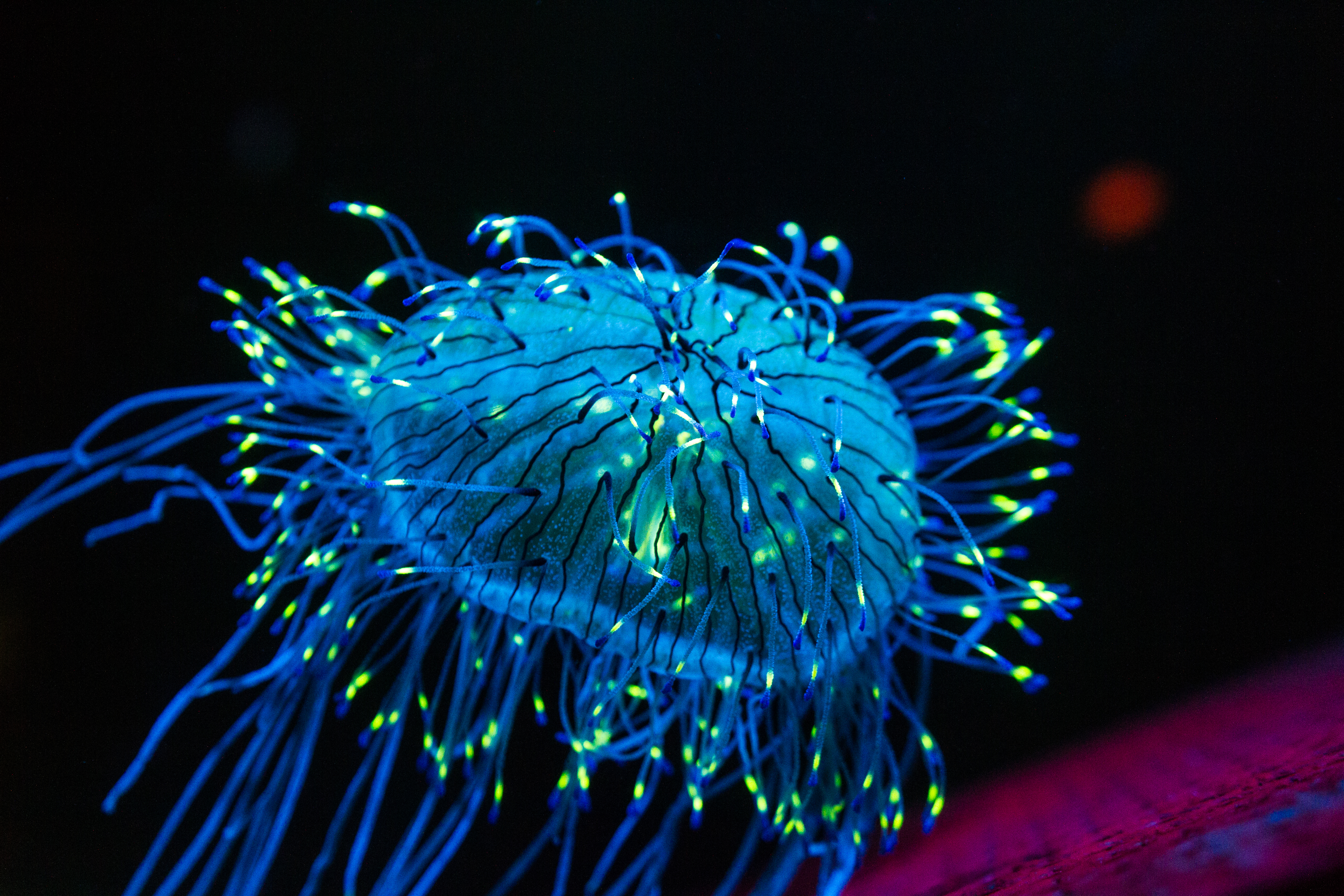
A flower hat jelly with its tentacles extended under blacklight

This fluorescent jelly has lustrous tentacles that coil and adhere to its rim when not in use. Its bell is translucent and pinstriped with opaque bands. Although the tentacles may look randomized in their arrangement, extensive research has been done to show that the tentacles are arranged mathematically. The tentacle arrangement displays an optimal hashing algorithm, specifically, Fibonacci hashing.

The fluorescent proteins in this species, which causes light to reflect off of the jellyfish, have been shown to help these predators obtain food. This light in the water can invoke supernormal stimuli, which attracts prey closer to the flower hat jellyfish, where they may be captured. This stimuli attracts the prey since the light that is displayed on the jellyfish is not normal for the habitat. An instinctual response in their prey is to go towards this light, which allows the jellyfish to catch and eat their prey with some more ease. The flower hat jelly can grow to be about 15 cm (6 in) in diameter. When first observed in the wild, typically around December, they only measure 2 cm (0.8 in).

Little is known about the details of its life cycle and no Olindias hydroids have been reported from the wild. Flower hat jellies have bred in a display at the Monterey Bay Aquarium. The hydroids attached themselves to various surfaces and formed small clusters. Eventually the medusae were released at a diameter of about 1 mm (0.04 in). Budding only happened when the hydroids were kept at water temperatures of 15 °C (59 °F); not 20 °C (68 °F) or 25 °C (77 °F). In contrast, the two warmer temperatures appeared to produce more medusae. This indicates that hydroid growth and reproduction (budding) occur in 15 °C (59 °F) or less, while warmer temperatures initiate the change into medusae. This matches the annual sea temperature variations observed in its native range. In aquariums, adults are usually kept in full salt water that is about 15–18 °C (59–64 °F).

== Applications in scientific research ==
Because hydroids are small and often transparent, detecting them in natural environments is difficult, which contributes to the limited knowledge of the species' life cycle. A fluorescent protein derived from Olindias formusus, Gamillus, has been developed as a fluorescent tag for tracking biological molecules of interest, including in research on viral entry inhibition of SARS-Cov-2.

Fluorescence has been suggested as a potential tool to also improve the detection of hydrozoan life stages. When illuminated with blue or ultraviolet light, transparent medusae or small polyps can become visible in plankton species or on settling panels. Polyps of the hydrozoan species Olindias formosus were detected for the first time through the fluorescence of medusa buds developing on hydroids. Intrinsic fluorescence has also been used to identify Porifera and Anthozoa recruits on settling panels.
