= Cubaia =

Scientific classification
- Kingdom: Animalia
- Phylum: Cnidaria
- Class: Hydrozoa
- Order: Limnomedusae
- Family: Olindiidae
- Genus: Cubaia; Mayer, 1894
- Species: C. aphrodite

Binomial name
- Cubaia aphrodite Mayer, 1894

Genus of hydrozoans

Cubaia is a genus of freshwater hydrozoans in the family Olindiidae. Like all members of that family, they have a polyp phase and a medusa phase. The genus is monotypic, including only the species Cubaia aphrodite. It has been reported in the Bahamas. The genus is carnivorous and reproduce asexually.
