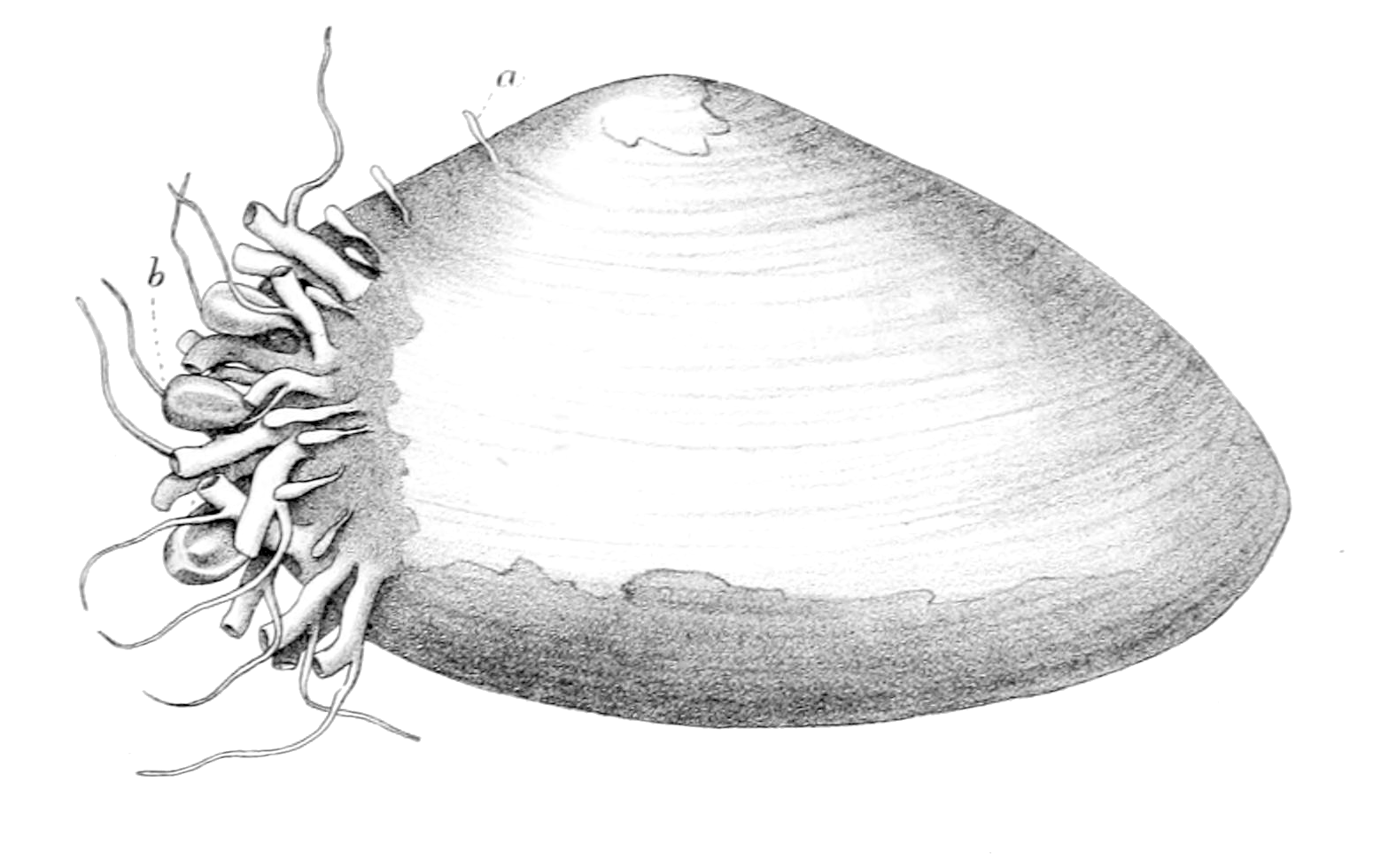
- A colony of hydrozoan Monobrachium parasitum on the Macoma calcarea shell.

Scientific classification
- Kingdom: Animalia
- Phylum: Cnidaria
- Class: Hydrozoa
- Order: Limnomedusae
- Family: Monobrachiidae; Mereschkowsky, 1877
- Genus: Monobrachium; Mereschkowsky, 1877

= Monobrachium =

Genus of hydrozoans

Monobrachium is a genus of hydroids. These marine cnidarians form the only genus of the monotypic family Monobrachiidae.

== Species ==
The genus contains the following species:

- Monobrachium antarcticum Robins, 1972
- Monobrachium drachi Marche-Marchad, 1963
- Monobrachium parasitum Mereschkowsky, 1877
