= Rhaptapagis =

Scientific classification
- Kingdom: Animalia
- Phylum: Cnidaria
- Class: Hydrozoa
- Order: Limnomedusae
- Family: Microhydrulidae
- Genus: Rhaptapagis; Bouillon & Deroux, 1967
- Species: R. cantacuzenei

Binomial name
- Rhaptapagis cantacuzenei Bouillon & Deroux, 1967

Genus of aquatic animals

Rhaptapagis is a monotypic genus of cnidarians belonging to the family Microhydrulidae.

Species:

- Rhaptapagis cantacuzenei Bouillon & Deroux, 1967
