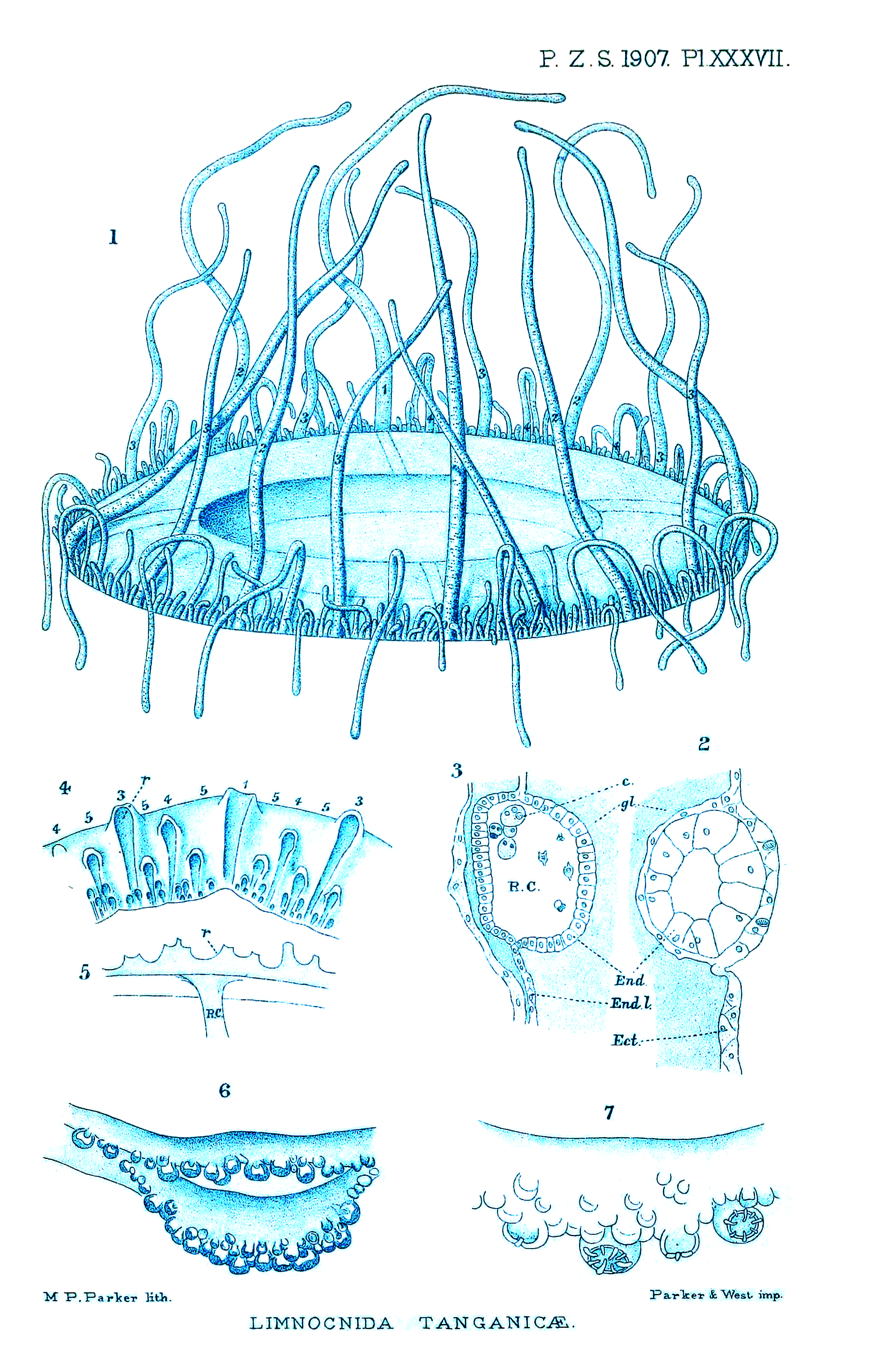
- Limnocnida tanganicæ

Scientific classification
- Domain: Eukaryota
- Kingdom: Animalia
- Phylum: Cnidaria
- Class: Hydrozoa
- Order: Limnomedusae
- Family: Olindiidae
- Genus: Limnocnida; Günther, 1893

= Limnocnida =

Genus of cnidarians

Limnocnida is a genus of hydrozoans belonging to the family Olindiidae.

The species of this genus are found in Southern Africa.

Species:

- Limnocnida biharensis Firoz-Ahmad, Sen, Mishra & Bharti, 1986
- Limnocnida congoensis Bouillon, 1959
- Limnocnida indica Annandale, 1912
- Limnocnida nepalensis Dumont, 1976
- Limnocnida tanganjicae Günther, 1893
- Limnocnida victoriae Günther, 1907
