= Astrohydra =

Scientific classification
- Kingdom: Animalia
- Phylum: Cnidaria
- Class: Hydrozoa
- Order: Limnomedusae
- Family: Olindiidae
- Genus: Astrohydra; Hashimoto, 1981

Genus of hydrozoans

Astrohydra is a genus of freshwater hydrozoans in the family Olindiidae. Like all members of that family, they have a polyp phase and a medusa phase. The genus is monotypic, including only the species Astrohydra japonica.
