= Armorhydridae =

Scientific classification
- Kingdom: Animalia
- Phylum: Cnidaria
- Class: Hydrozoa
- Order: Limnomedusae
- Family: Armorhydridae

Family of hydrozoans

Armorhydridae is a family of cnidarians belonging to the order Limnomedusae.

Genera:

- Armorhydra Swedmark & Teissier, 1958
