= Aglauropsis =

Scientific classification
- Kingdom: Animalia
- Phylum: Cnidaria
- Class: Hydrozoa
- Order: Limnomedusae
- Family: Olindiidae
- Genus: Aglauropsis; Müller, 1865

Genus of hydrozoans

== Aglauropsis ==
Aglauropsis is a genus of marine hydrozoans in the family Olindiidae.

It includes the species:

• Aglaurospsis aeora _{Mills, Reed & Hand 1976}

• Aglaurospsis contanti _{Browne, 1902}

• Aglaurospsis edwardsii _{Pagès, Bouillon & Gili, 1991}

• Aglaurospsis jarli _{Kramp, 1955}

• Aglauropsis kawari _{Moreira & Yamashita, 1972}

• Aglauropsis vannucci _{Thomas & Chhapgar, 1975}

== Sightings ==
Aglauropsis have been seen eight times as of 29/09/2026 in California, USA - specifically around the San Francisco area.
