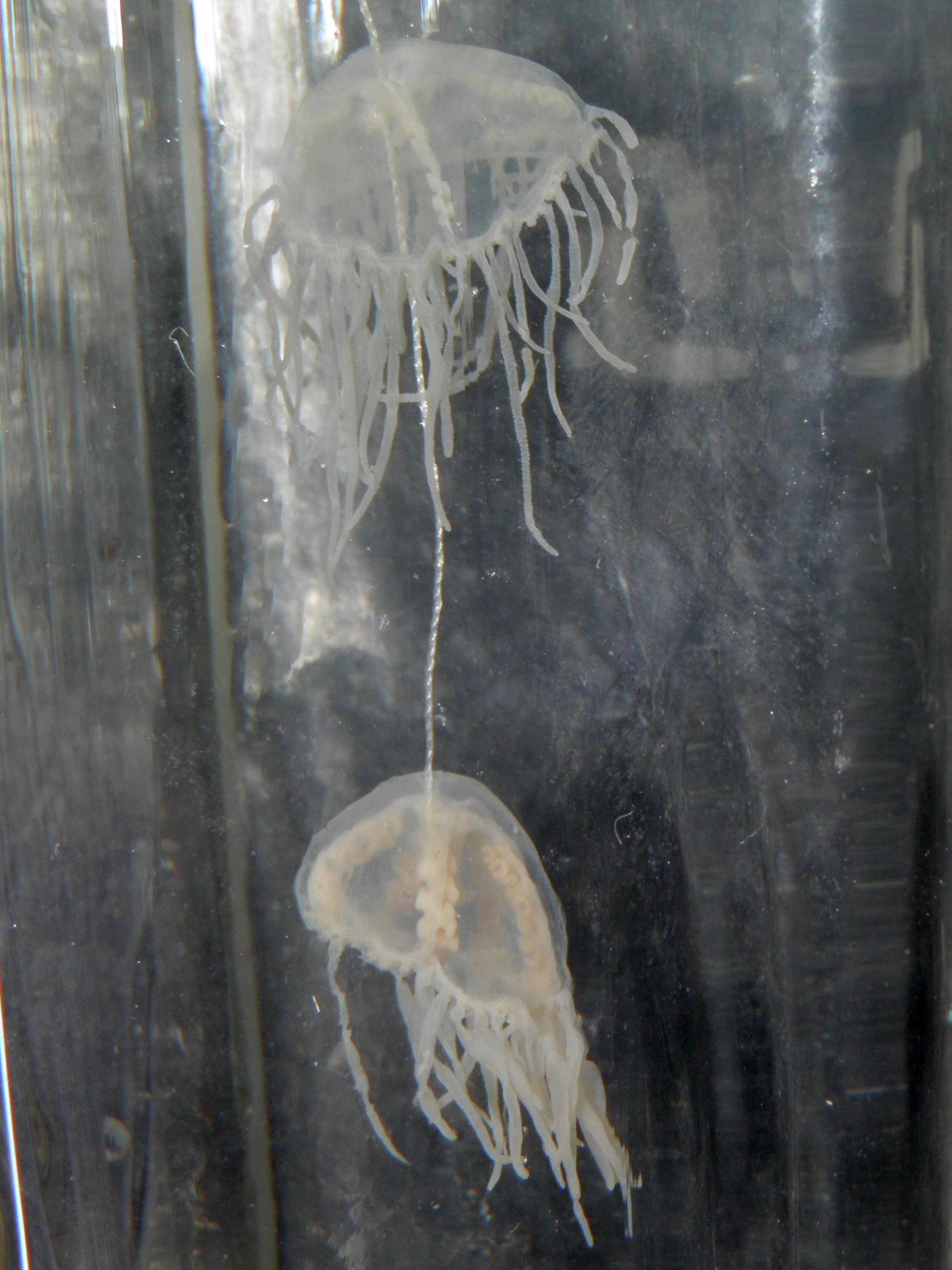
- G. vertens

Scientific classification
- Domain: Eukaryota
- Kingdom: Animalia
- Phylum: Cnidaria
- Class: Hydrozoa
- Order: Limnomedusae
- Family: Olindiidae
- Genus: Gonionemus; A. Agassiz, 1862

= Gonionemus =

Genus of hydrozoans

Gonionemus is a genus of hydrozoans that use adhesive discs near the middle of each tentacle to attach to eelgrass, sea lettuce, or various types of algae instead of swimming. They are small (bell diameter to 25 mm) and hard to see when hanging onto swaying seaweed. Nevertheless, they are capable of swimming when necessary. The bell is transparent, revealing the four orange to yellowish-tan gonads that lie along most of the length of the four radial canals. The pale yellow manubrium has four short, frilly lips. Up to 80 tentacles line the bell margin, with about an equal number of statocysts. Copepods are a favored prey.

This marine hydrozoan is common in warmer waters. The conspicuous stage in the dimorphic lifecycle is the small medusa. The polypoid stage is present as a tiny, solitary polyp which feeds on protozoans and other small plants and animals. The polyp stage closely resembles Hydra.

The medusae are active swimmers that propel themselves upward in the water column by rhythmic pulsations of the bell. Upon reaching the surface, the bell relaxes, the tentacles become fully extended, and any small fish or crustaceans encountered as the medusae slowly drift toward the bottom are ensnared. Occasionally, the medusae use their adhesive pads to attach to seaweed or other objects near the bottom, extend their tentacles, and wait for prey to bump into them.

The manubrium hangs down from the center of the subrellum. It bears the cross-shaped mouth and the four short oral lobes which grip the food. Digestion begins in the center of the manubrium, which communicates with the four radial canals and the ring canal. The velum is well-developed and used in swimming. Having a velum is characteristic of the hydrozoan medusae.

The gonads are four yellowish structures embedded in the surface of the epidermis beneath the radial canals. The ovaries are more granular in appearance than the testes (sexes are separate). The gametes are shed into the sea, and the zygotes develop into ciliated planular larvae which grow into minute polyps. These polyps can bud off other polyps or medusae. The tentacles of the medusae are hollow and connected to the exumbrellar surface by a tentacular bulb where cnidoblasts are formed.

== Species ==
- Gonionemus agilis Watson & Govindarajan, 2017
- Gonionemus hamatus Kramp, 1965
- Gonionemus vertens A. Agassiz, 1862
