= Microhydrula =

Scientific classification
- Domain: Eukaryota
- Kingdom: Animalia
- Phylum: Cnidaria
- Class: Hydrozoa
- Order: Limnomedusae
- Family: Microhydrulidae
- Genus: Microhydrula; Valkanov, 1965

Genus of aquatic animals

Microhydrula is a genus of cnidarians belonging to the family Microhydrulidae.

Species:

- Microhydrula pontica Valkanov, 1965
