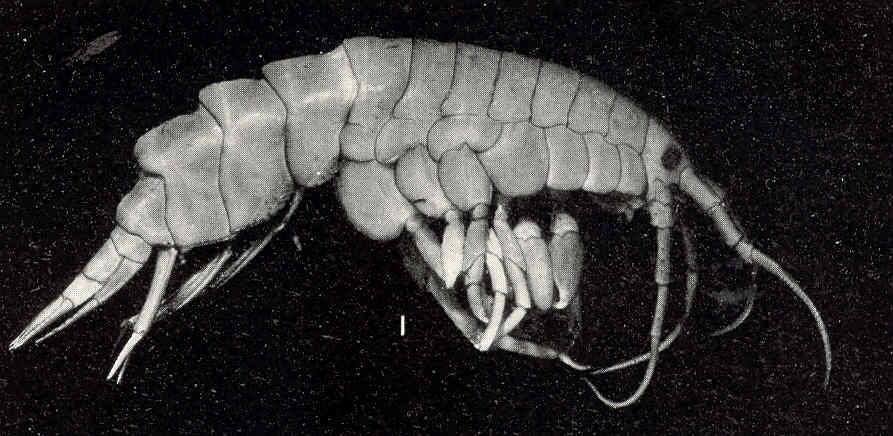
- Calliopius laeviusculus

Scientific classification
- Domain: Eukaryota
- Kingdom: Animalia
- Phylum: Arthropoda
- Class: Malacostraca
- Order: Amphipoda
- Family: Calliopiidae
- Genus: Calliopius; Liljeborg, 1865

= Calliopius =

Genus of crustaceans

Calliopius is a genus of amphipods in the family Calliopiidae. There are ten described species in Calliopius.

== Species ==
These nine species belong to the genus Calliopius:

- Calliopius behringi Gurjanova, 1951
- Calliopius carinatus Bousfield & Hendrycks, 1997
- Calliopius columbianus Bousfield & Hendrycks, 1997
- Calliopius crenulatus Chevreux & Fage, 1925
- Calliopius ezoensis Shimoji, Nakano & Tomikawa, 2020
- Calliopius georgianus Pfeffer
- Calliopius laeviusculus (Krøyer, 1838)
- Calliopius pacificus Bousfield & Hendrycks, 1997
- Calliopius rathkii Zaddach, 1844
- Calliopius sablensis Bousfield & Hendrycks, 1997
