= Microhydrulidae =

Scientific classification
- Kingdom: Animalia
- Phylum: Cnidaria
- Class: Hydrozoa
- Order: Limnomedusae
- Family: Microhydrulidae; Bouillon & Deroux, 1967

Family of hydrozoans

Microhydrulidae is a family of cnidarians belonging to the order Limnomedusae.

Genera:

- Microhydrula Valkanov, 1965
- Rhaptapagis Bouillon & Deroux, 1967
