= Eperetmus =

Scientific classification
- Kingdom: Animalia
- Phylum: Cnidaria
- Class: Hydrozoa
- Order: Limnomedusae
- Family: Olindiidae
- Genus: Eperetmus; Bigelow, 1915

Genus of hydrozoans

Eperetmus is a genus of freshwater hydrozoans in the family Olindiidae. Like all members of that family, they have a polyp phase and a medusa phase. The genus is monotypic, including only the species Eperetmus typus.
