= Vallentinia =

Scientific classification
- Kingdom: Animalia
- Phylum: Cnidaria
- Class: Hydrozoa
- Order: Limnomedusae
- Family: Olindiidae
- Genus: Vallentinia; Browne, 1902

Species
- See text

Genus of hydrozoans

Vallentinia is a genus of hydrozoans in the family Olindiidae.

== Species ==
The World Register of Marine Species currently lists the following species:

- Vallentinia adherens Hyman, 1947
- Vallentinia falklandica Browne, 1902
- Vallentinia gabriellae Vannucci Mendes, 1948
