= Calpasoma =

Scientific classification
- Kingdom: Animalia
- Phylum: Cnidaria
- Class: Hydrozoa
- Order: Limnomedusae
- Family: Olindiidae
- Genus: Calpasoma; Fuhrmann, 1939
- Species: C. dactylopterum

Binomial name
- Calpasoma dactylopterum Fuhrmann, 1939

Genus of hydrozoans

Calpasoma is a genus of freshwater hydrozoans in the family Olindiidae. Like all members of that family, they have a polyp phase and a medusa phase. The genus is monotypic, including only the species Calpasoma dactylopterum. Calpasoma has been reported living in fresh water in North America.
