= Maeotias =

Scientific classification
- Kingdom: Animalia
- Phylum: Cnidaria
- Class: Hydrozoa
- Order: Limnomedusae
- Family: Olindiidae
- Genus: Maeotias; Ostroumoff, 1896
- Species: M. marginata

Binomial name
- Maeotias marginata (Modeer, 1791)

Synonyms
- Maeotias inexpectata Ostroumov, 1896; Maeotias inexspectata Ostroumoff, 1896

Genus of hydrozoans

Maeotias is a genus of hydrozoans in the family Olindiidae. It is a monotypic genus with only a single species, Maeotias marginata, commonly known as the Black Sea jellyfish or brackish water hydromedusa and often referred to as Maeotias inexpectata in the literature. It was first described from the Don and Kuban estuaries of the Sea of Azov (which was called the Lake of Maeotis in antiquity), and also occurs in the Black Sea, all of which are areas of low salinity. It has been recorded in several other estuarine locations around the world and is regarded as an invasive species.

== Description ==
M. marginata has a small medusa with a bell diameter of up to 5.5 cm (2.2 in). It is hemispherical in shape and the gonads hang from the four distinctive radial canals. The marginal ring canal has 50 short centripetal canals branching from it with a dense marginal fringe of about 600 short trailing tentacles. This hydrozoan is opaque white with a slightly reddish tinge near the bell margin.

== Distribution ==
Maeotias marginata is native to the Sea of Azov and the Black Sea. It has spread to other parts of the world and was first detected in North America in 1968 in the estuaries of rivers entering Chesapeake Bay. It is thought to have been brought to America by shipping. The polyp stage possibly arrived as a fouling organism on the hull of a ship but it is unlikely that a brackish water species would have survived such a long voyage through saline ocean water. Alternatively, it may have arrived as an egg or as an encysted dormant stage of a polyp. More likely, perhaps, it arrived in a ballast tank or in the bilge water in a vessel. In 1999, it was observed in the northern Baltic Sea, and specimens have also been found in the Netherlands (1962), France (1971) and the Pacific coast of North America, where it was found in the estuaries of the Petaluma and Napa Rivers flowing into San Francisco Bay in 1992 and 1993, and has since become established.

== Biology ==
The feeding behaviour of M. marginata has been observed in a shallow-water location with seagrasses growing in sand. It uses rhythmic contractions of the bell to move upwards through the water, then it flattens the bell and extends its tentacles widely and drifts slowly downwards, finally resting on the bottom in the same extended position for a while. During this descent, it captures and feeds on the zooplankton it encounters and small benthic organisms may be caught underneath as it lands. Its diet consists mostly of small crustaceans, including barnacle larvae, copepod eggs and larvae, and crab larvae.

M. marginata can reproduce both sexually and asexually, by budding. All individuals found in the Napa and Petaluma River population are male, and must have been produced asexually following the original introduction of perhaps a single male polyp.
