= Microcotyle hiatulae =

Scientific classification
- Kingdom: Animalia
- Phylum: Platyhelminthes
- Class: Monogenea
- Order: Mazocraeidea
- Family: Microcotylidae
- Genus: Microcotyle
- Species: M. hiatulae

Binomial name
- Microcotyle hiatulae Goto, 1899

Synonyms
- Microcotyle furcata Linton, 1940; Microcotyle (Microcotyle) hiatulae (Goto, 1899) Unnithan, 1971

Species of worms

Microcotyle hiatulae is a species of monogenean, parasitic on the gills of a marine fish. It belongs to the family Microcotylidae. This species was first described by Goto in 1899.

== Systematics ==
Microcotyle hiatulae was described by Goto in 1899 from the gills of the labrid Hiatula onitis collected near Newport, off Rhode Island, United States. Forty-one years later, Linton (1940) described M. furcata from the gills the same host collected near Woods Hole, off Massachusetts. As Linton did not mention M. hiatulae in his description of M. furcata, Thoney & Munroe suggested that Linton was unaware of Goto's earlier description of M. hiatulae. Thoney & Munroe examined Microcotyle specimens from T. onitis off Rhode Island, Massachusetts, Chesapeake Bay and indicated that all specimens collected from all three locations were indistinguishable from M. hiatulae. They concluded that Microcotyle furcata should be considered a junior subjective synonym of M. hiatulae'. Thoney & Munroe provided a redescription and illustrations of Microcotyle hiatulae to complete the original description lacking data on intraspecific variation and some important taxonomic characters, and also described the postlarval development. Thoney and Munroe's comparison of M. hiatulae with 18 other species of Microcotyle described previously from 15 host species living sympatrically with Hiatula onitis along the Atlantic coast of the United States by examination of published descriptions showed that many of the species were morphologically similar. Thoney and Munroe also noted that it was extremely difficult to identify an individual to species level in absence of host species identification.

Unnithan erected the subgenus Microcotyle in which he placed Microcotyle hiatulae as Microcotyle (Microcotyle) hiatulae.

== Description ==
Microcotyle hiatulae has the general morphology of all species of Microcotyle, with a symmetrical body, comprising an anterior part which contains most organs and a posterior part called the haptor. The haptor bears 23 clamps, arranged as two rows, one on each side. The clamps of the haptor attach the animal to the gill of the fish. There are also two small buccal suckers at the anterior extremity. The digestive organs include an anterior, terminal mouth, a pharynx, an oesophagus and a posterior intestine with two branches of un equal lengths, provided with numerous bifurcating branches on the inner and outer sides and one of them extends much more backwards into the haptor. Each adult contains male and female reproductive organs. The reproductive organs include an anterior genital atrium provided with numerous conical slightly recurved spines and opening a short distance in front of the hind end of the oesophagus, a dorsal vagina opening behind the front end of the intestine, a single ovary "somewhat like a hastily written capital E", vitellaria extending from near the hind end of the oesophagus to the hind end of the body and 15 large testes which are posterior to the ovary and extends from the hind end of the ovary to a little in front of the posterior end of the vitellaria.

== Hosts and localities ==
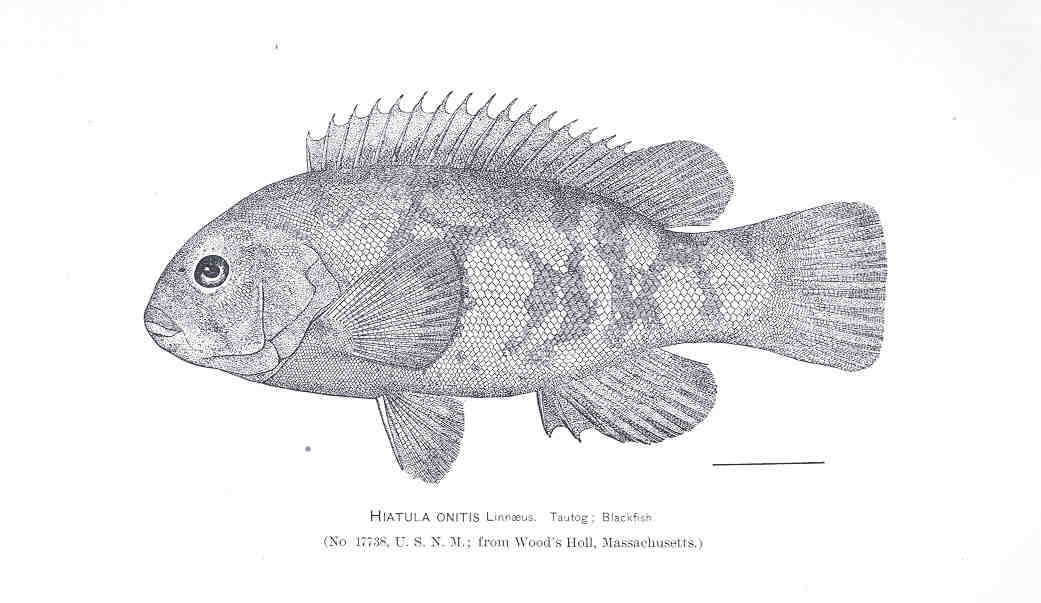
Tautoga onitis is the type host of Microcotyle hiatulae

The type-host in the original publication is Hiatula Onitis (Labridae) (currently Tautoga onitis). The type-locality is off Rhode Island, United States.

== Treatment ==
Thoney and Hargis found that formalin (250 ppm, 1 h) was ineffective against Microcotyle hiatulae on the gills of Tautoga onitis.
