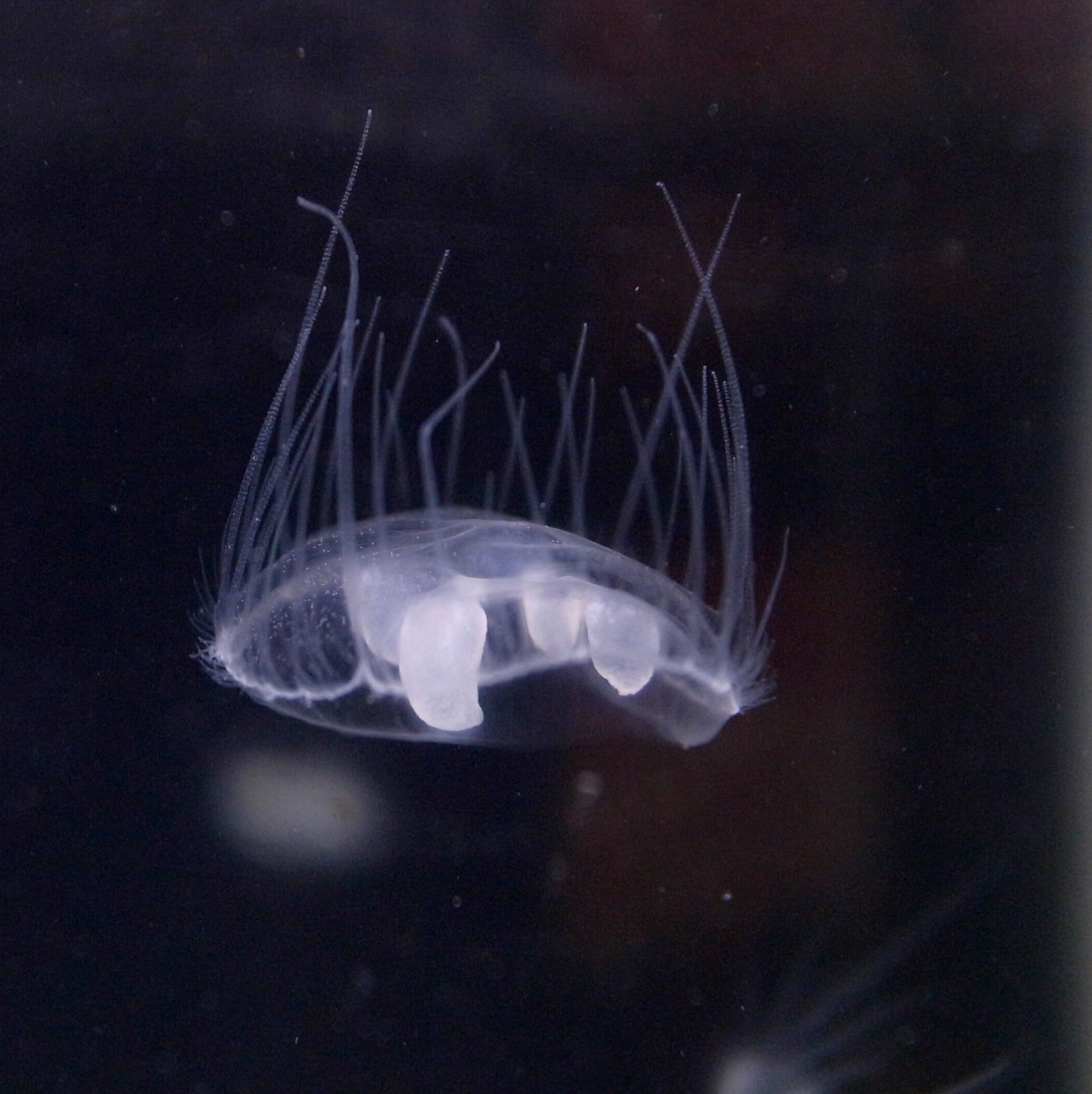
- Craspedacusta sowerbyi

Scientific classification
- Kingdom: Animalia
- Phylum: Cnidaria
- Class: Hydrozoa
- Order: Limnomedusae
- Family: Olindiidae
- Genus: Craspedacusta; Lankester, 1880

Type species
- Craspedacusta sowerbii Lankester

Species
- See text

Synonyms
- Limnocodium Allman, 1880; Microhydra Potts, 1885

= Craspedacusta =

Genus of hydrozoans

Craspedacusta is a genus of freshwater hydrozoans in the family Olindiidae. Like all members of that family, they have a polyp phase and a medusa phase.

== Species ==
The following species are recognized in the genus Craspedacusta:

- Craspedacusta brevinema He & Xu, 2002
- Craspedacusta chuxiongensis He, Xu & Nie, 2000
- Craspedacusta hangzhouensis He, 1980
- Craspedacusta iseanum (Oka & Hara, 1922)
- Craspedacusta kuoi Shieh & Wang, 1959
- Craspedacusta sichuanensis He & Kou, 1984
- Craspedacusta sinensis Gaw & Kung, 1939
- Craspedacusta sowerbii Lankester, 1880
- Craspedacusta vovasi Naumov & Stepanjants, 1971
- Craspedacusta xinyangensis He, 1980
- Craspedacusta ziguiensis He & Xu, 1985
