= Hexaphilia =

Scientific classification
- Kingdom: Animalia
- Phylum: Cnidaria
- Class: Hydrozoa
- Order: Limnomedusae
- Family: Olindiidae
- Genus: Hexaphilia; Gershwin and Zeidler, 2003
- Species: H. scoresbyi

Binomial name
- Hexaphilia scoresbyi Gershwin and Zeidler, 2003

Genus of hydrozoans

Hexaphilia is a genus of freshwater hydrozoans in the family Olindiidae. Like all members of that family, they have a polyp phase and a medusa phase. The genus is monotypic, including only the species Hexaphilia scoresbyi.
