= Gossea (cnidarian) =

Scientific classification
- Kingdom: Animalia
- Phylum: Cnidaria
- Class: Hydrozoa
- Order: Limnomedusae
- Family: Olindiidae
- Genus: Gossea; Agassiz, 1862

Genus of hydrozoans

Gossea is a genus of hydrozoans belonging to the family Olindiidae.

The species of this genus are found in Europe and America.

Species:

- Gossea brachymera Bigelow, 1909
- Gossea corynetes (Gosse, 1853)
- Gossea faureae Picard, 1952
- Gossea indica Bouillon, 1978
