= Scolionema (cnidarian) =

Scientific classification
- Kingdom: Animalia
- Phylum: Cnidaria
- Class: Hydrozoa
- Order: Limnomedusae
- Family: Olindiidae
- Genus: Scolionema; Kishinouye, 1910

Genus of hydrozoans

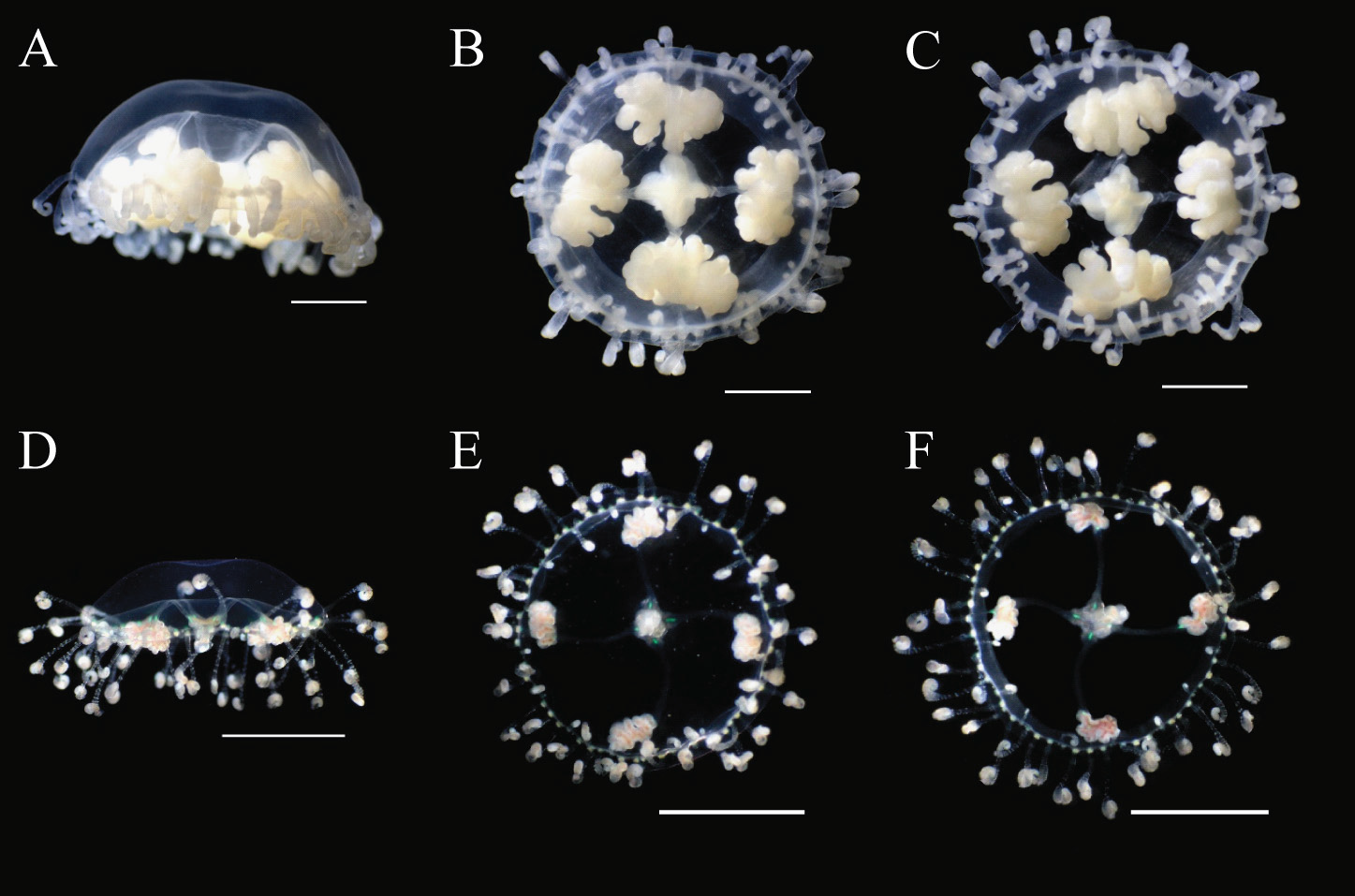
Scolionema

Scolionema is a genus of hydrozoans belonging to the family Olindiidae.

Species:

- Scolionema sanshin Toshino, 2017
- Scolionema suvaense (Agassiz & Mayer, 1899)
