= Apherusa =

Scientific classification
- Kingdom: Animalia
- Phylum: Arthropoda
- Class: Malacostraca
- Order: Amphipoda
- Family: Calliopiidae
- Genus: Apherusa; Walker, 1891

Synonyms
- Gossea Spence Bate, 1862

Genus of crustaceans

Apherusa is a genus of amphipods belonging to the family Calliopiidae.

The species of this genus are found in Northern Hemisphere.

== Species ==
Species:

- Apherusa alacris Krapp-Schickel, 1969
- Apherusa antiqua (Spence Bate, 1859)
- Apherusa barretti (Spence Bate, 1862)
