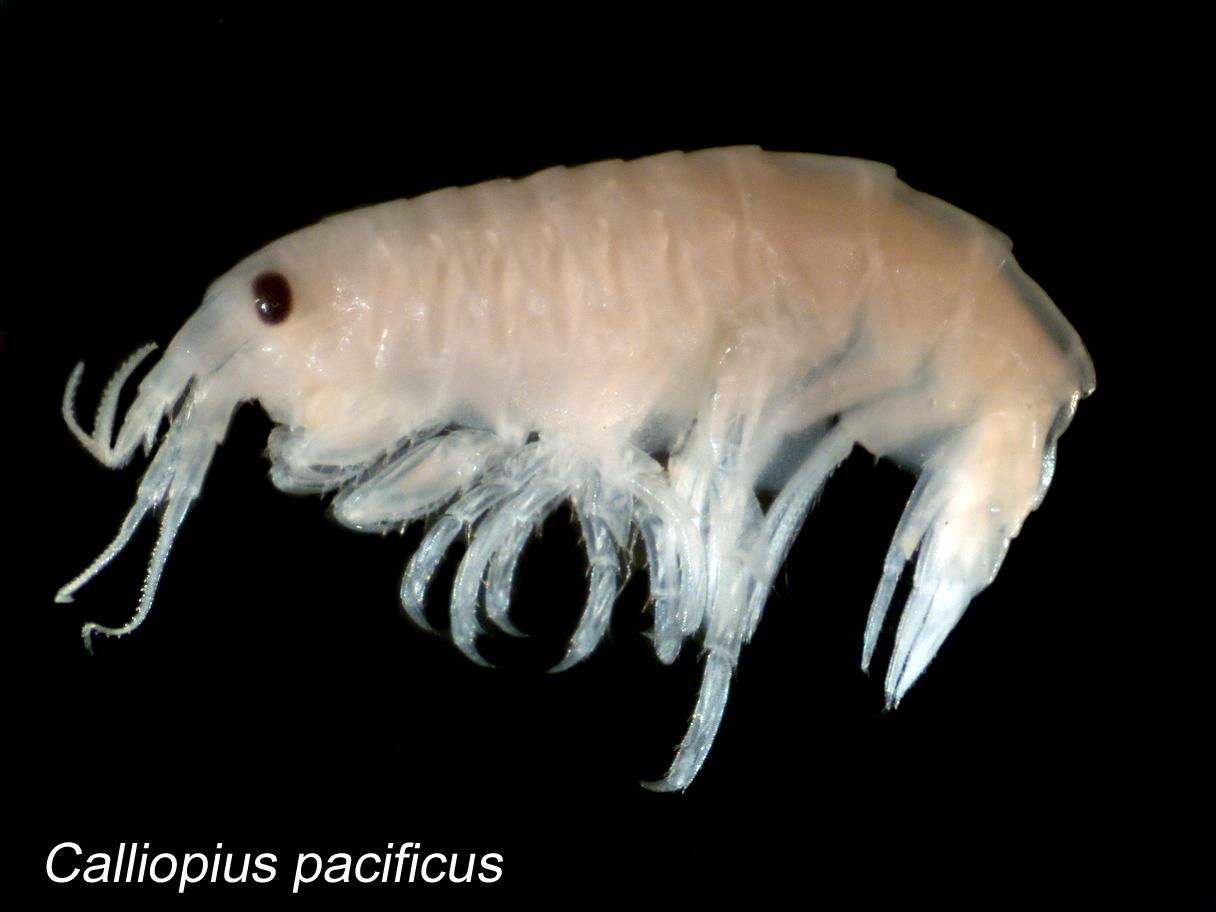
- Calliopius pacificus

Scientific classification
- Kingdom: Animalia
- Phylum: Arthropoda
- Clade: Pancrustacea
- Class: Malacostraca
- Order: Amphipoda
- Parvorder: Eusiridira
- Superfamily: Eusiroidea
- Family: Calliopiidae; G. O. Sars, 1895

Genera
- See text

= Calliopiidae =

Family of crustaceans

Calliopiidae is a family of amphipods, containing the following genera:

- Amphithopsis Boeck, 1861
- Apherusa Walker, 1891
- Bouvierella Chevreux, 1900
- Calliopiella Schellenberg, 1925
- Calliopiurus Bushueva, 1986
- Calliopius Liljeborg, 1865
- Cleippides Boeck, 1871
- Frigora Ren in Ren & Huang, 1991
- Halirages Boeck, 1871
- Haliragoides G. O. Sars, 1895
- Harpinioides Stebbing, 1888
- Laothoes Boeck, 1871
- Leptamphopus G. O. Sars, 1895
- Lopyastis Thurston, 1974
- Manerogeneia Barnard & Karaman, 1987
- Membrilopus Barnard & Karaman, 1987
- Metaleptamphopus Chevreux, 1911
- Oligochinus J. L. Barnard, 1969
- Oradarea Walker, 1903
- Paracalliopiella Tzvetkova & Kudrjaschov, 1975
- Pontogeneoides Nicholls, 1938
- Stenopleura Stebbing, 1888
- Stenopleuroides Birstein & M. Vinogradov, 1964
- Tylosapis Thurston, 1974
- Weyprechtia Stuxberg, 1880
- Whangarusa Barnard & Karaman, 1987
