= Seitarō Gotō =

Japanese biologist

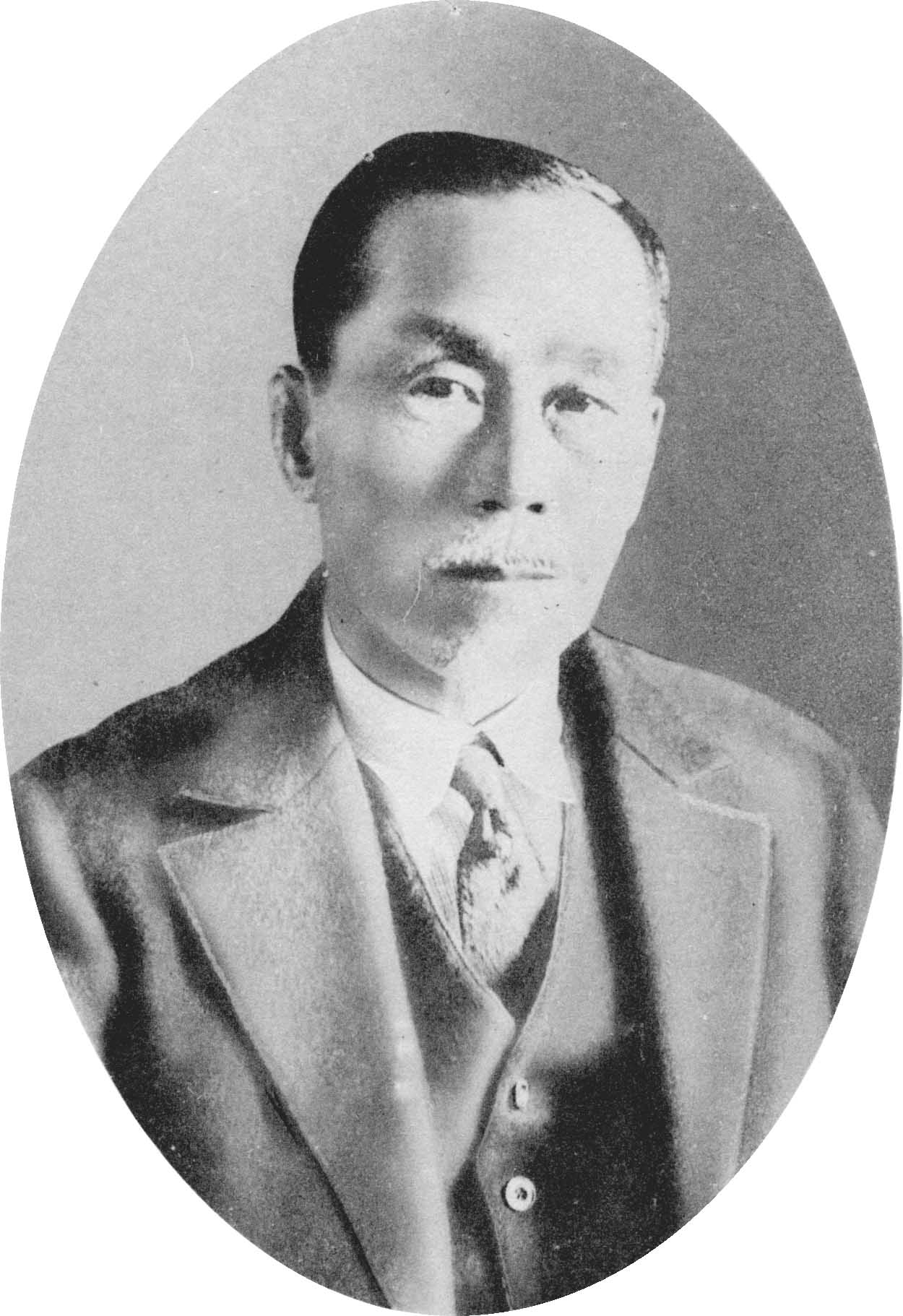
- Born: 15 September 1867
- Died: 20 July 1935 (aged 67)
- Citizenship: Japan
- Known for: parasitology, Monogenea
- Scientific career
- Fields: Parasitology, Zoology
- Institutions: University of Tokyo

Seitarō Gotō (1867–1935) was a Japanese scientist, known for his works on the Monogenea, a class of parasitic flatworms which are ectoparasites of fishes. He also worked on other invertebrates, such as Coelenterates and Echinoderms.

== Career ==
Seitarō Gotō was a student at the Department of Animal Science at the Imperial University of Science and was graduated in 1890. He studied in the United States in 1894, at Johns Hopkins University, and then at Harvard University. After his return to Japan in 1896, he became professor at Daiichi High School. He became professor at the Tokyo Imperial University in 1909. In 1920, he was appointed head of the University of Tokyo's Department of Science. In 1929 he created the Japan Parasitology Society and became its first President.

== Eponymous taxa ==
Several taxa were named in honour of Seitarō Gotō. These include the genus Gotocotyla Ishii, 1936 and the family Gotocotylidae Yamaguti, 1963 (Monogenea). A number of species were also named after him, including Acanthocephalus gotoi Van Cleave, 1925 (Acanthocephala), Caryophyllaeus gotoi Motomura, 1927 (Cestoda), and Microcotyle gotoi Yamaguti, 1934 (Monogenea).

== Drawings of Monogeneans by Seitarō Gotō ==
His 1894 book includes several plates of monogeneans; some are below.

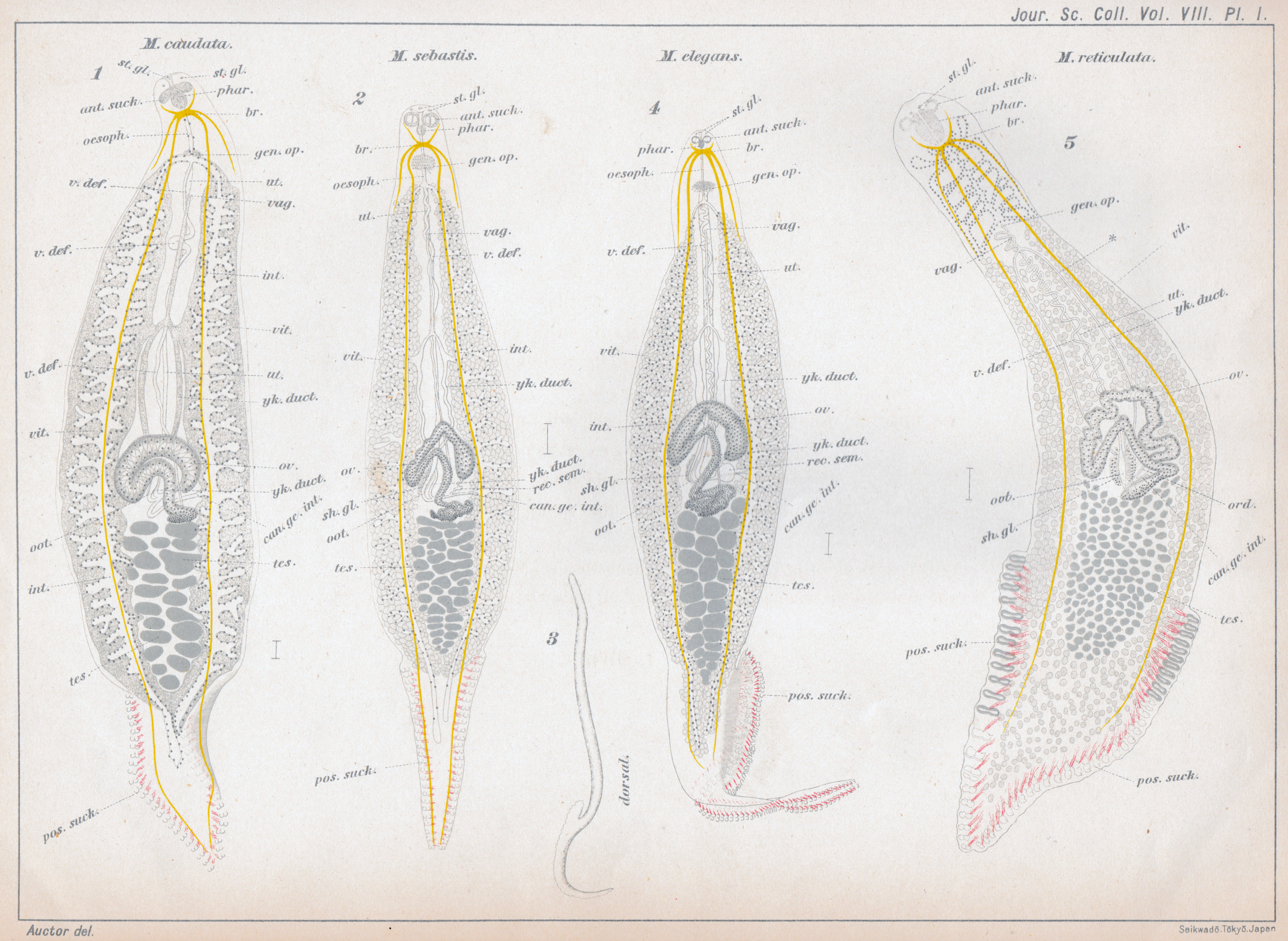
Plate 1 of the book

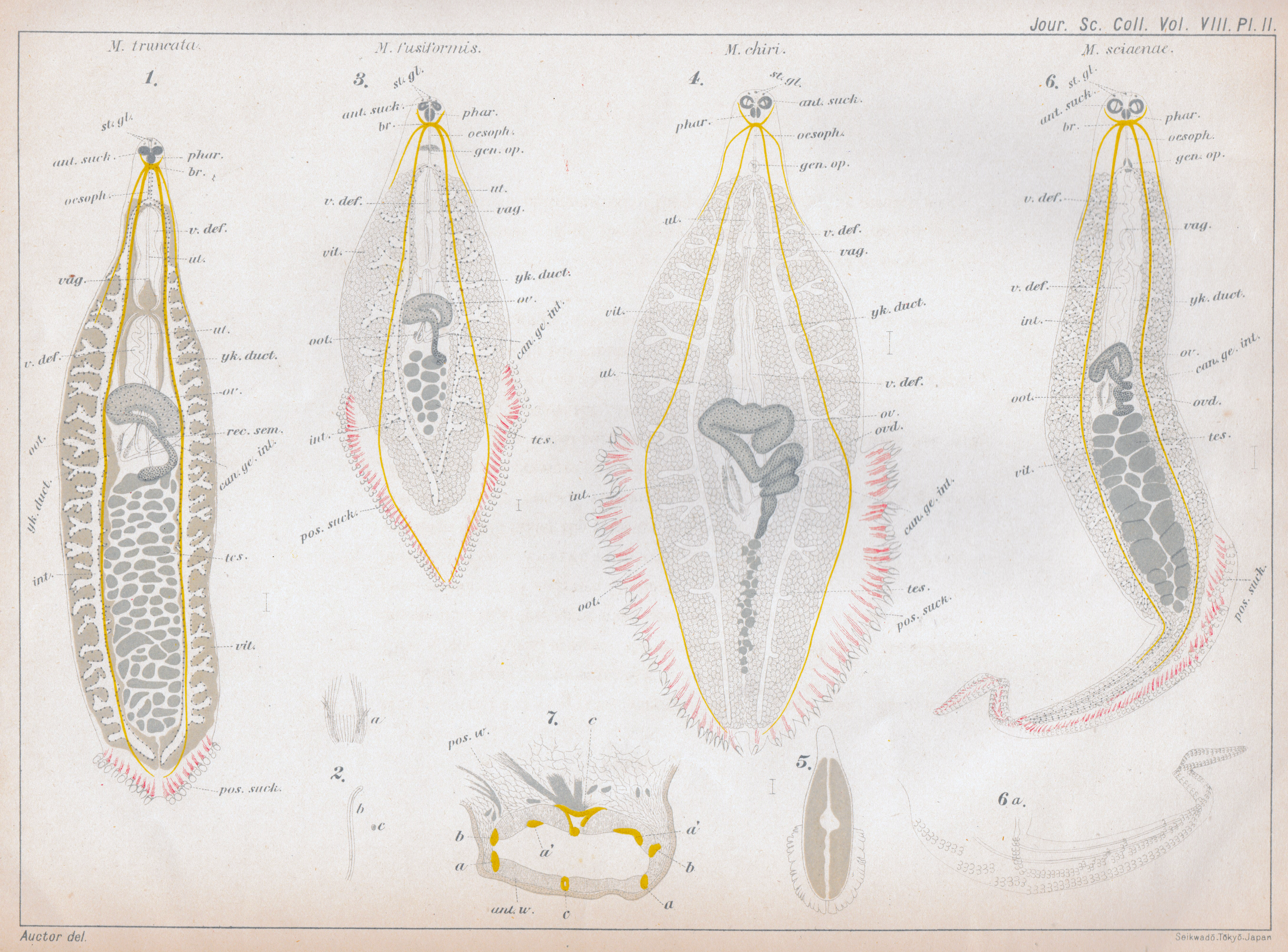
Plate 2 of the book

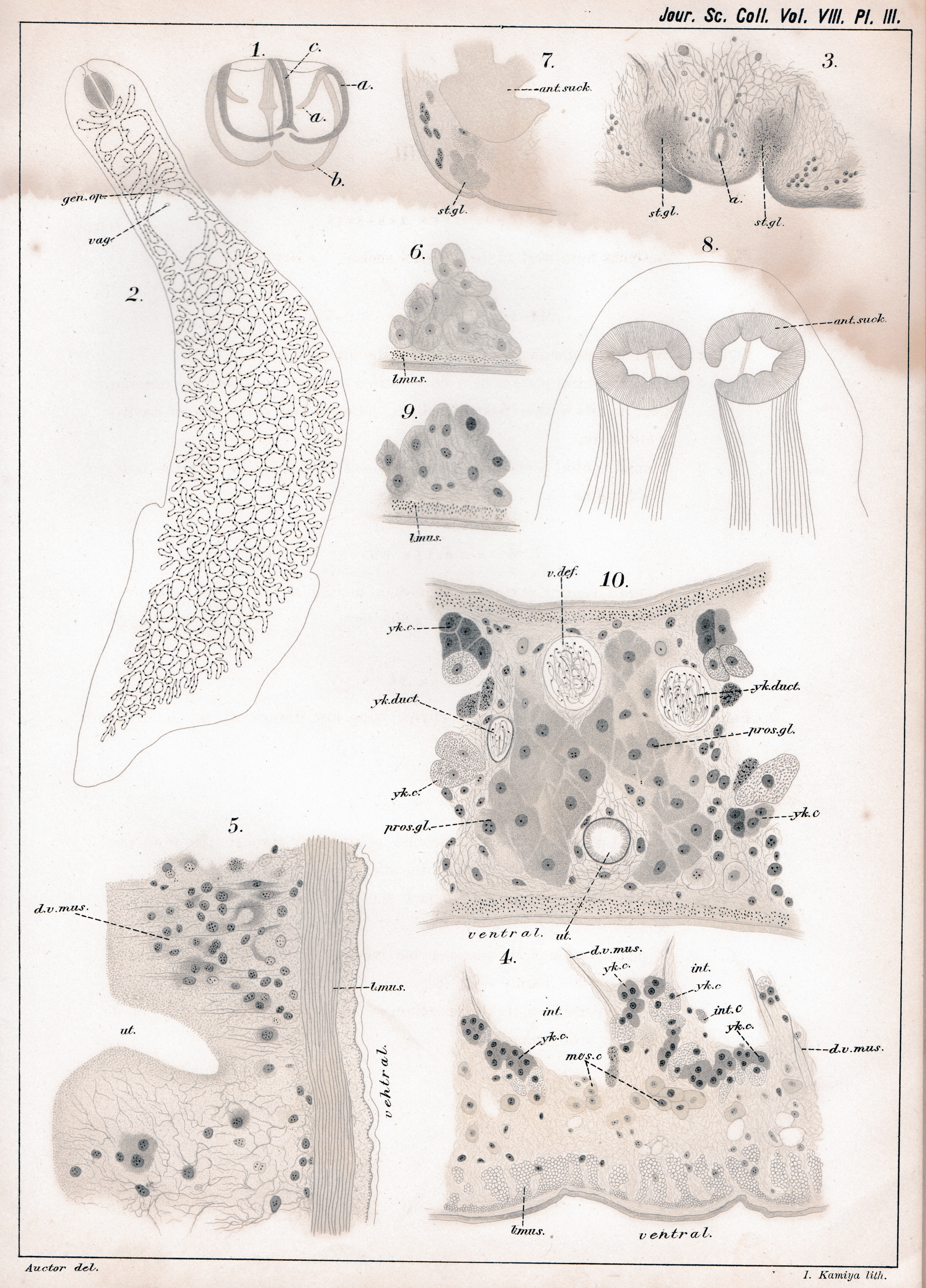
Plate 3 of the book

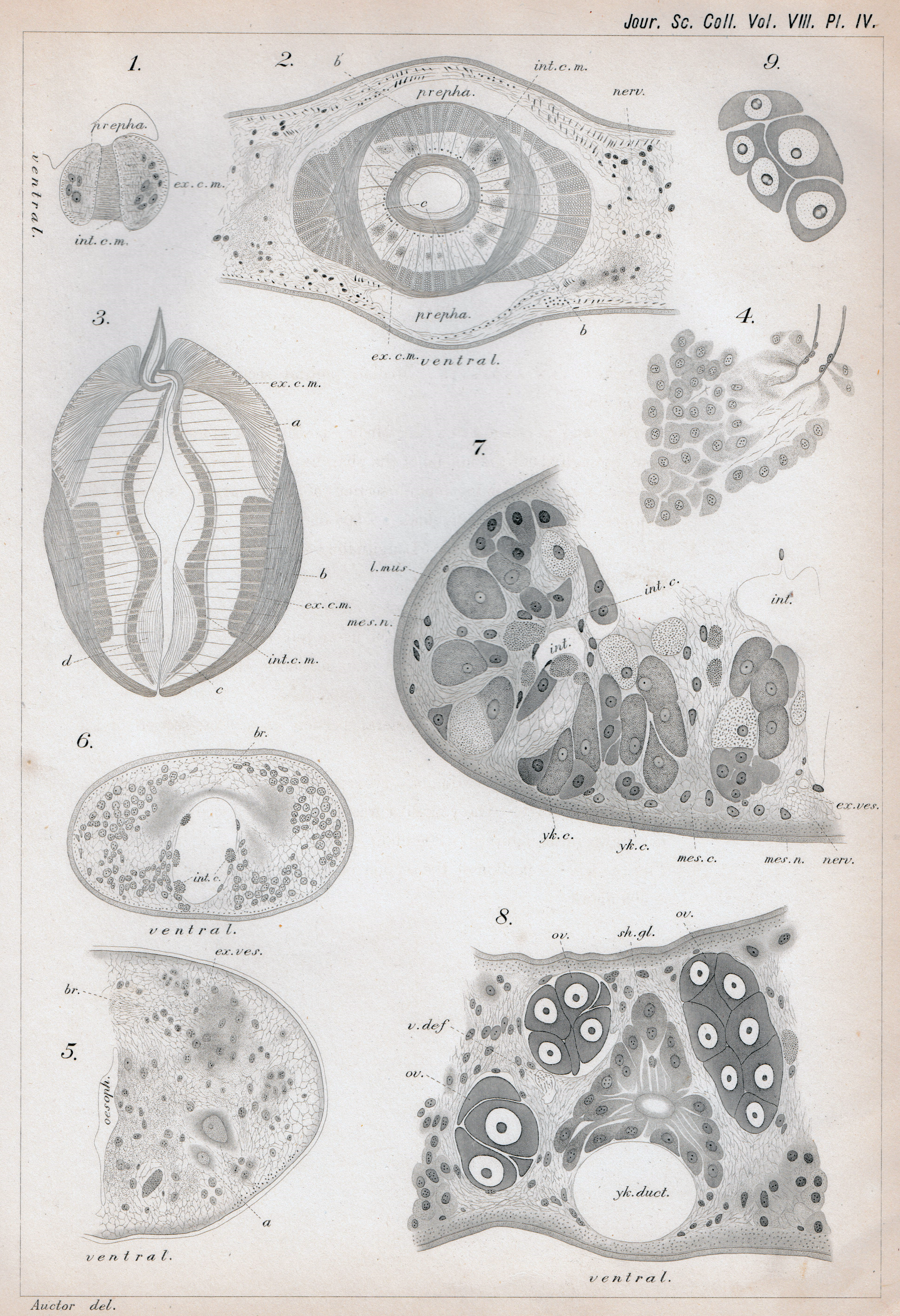
Plate 4 of the book
