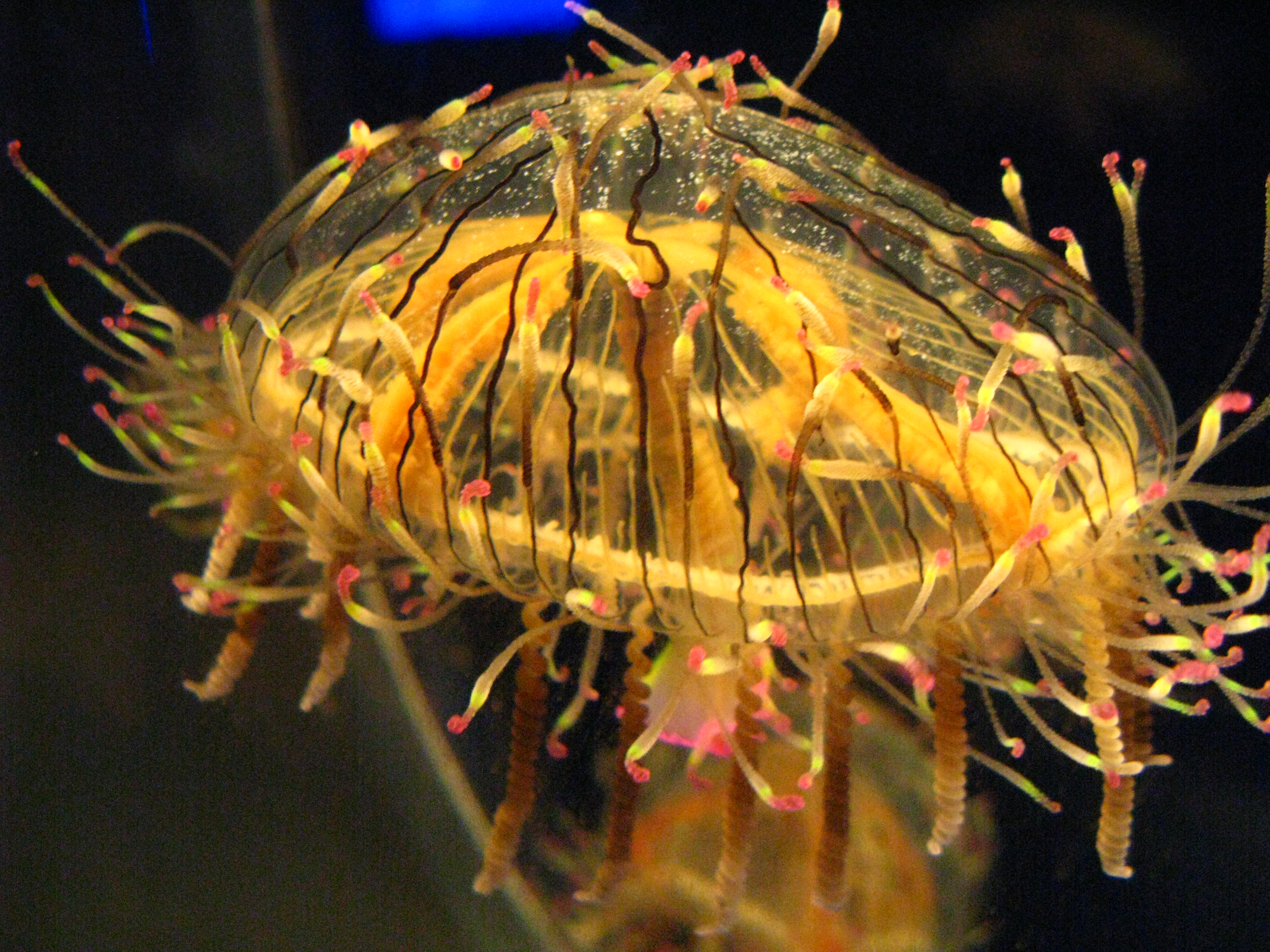
- Olindias formosa

Scientific classification
- Kingdom: Animalia
- Phylum: Cnidaria
- Class: Hydrozoa
- Order: Limnomedusae
- Family: Olindiidae; Haeckel, 1879

= Olindiidae =

Family of hydrozoans

Olindiidae is a family of hydrozoans in the order Limnomedusae. They have a polyp phase and a medusa phase. The polyps are generally small (1 mm) and solitary, but a few species are colonial. They have a varying number of tentacles and can reproduce by budding. In the largest species, the medusae can grow to 15 cm (6 in). Centripetal canals may be present or absent and the radial canals are unbranched. The gonads are beside the radial canals, except in Limnocnida, where they are on the manubrium. The fertilised eggs develop into planula larvae which become polyps. These multiply asexually or can bud off medusae. In some species, medusae are only produced when the water temperature exceeds a certain level. Most species are marine, but several can also be found in brackish water and a few, notably Craspedacusta (such as C. sowerbii) and Limnocnida, are found in fresh water.

== Taxonomy ==
This family is named after its type genus Olindias Muller 1861, but with confusion about the correct spelling, with Olindiadae, Olindiidae, Olindiadidae and Olindiasidae all being used. Haeckel established the family in 1879 as Olindiadae, but his intentions as to the stem of the genus and hence the name of the family are unclear. In 2010, Calder determined that Olindiidae was the correct form.

=== Genera ===
The World Register of Marine Species lists 15 genera:

- Aglauropsis Mueller, 1865
- Astrohydra Hashimoto, 1981
- Calpasoma Fuhrmann, 1939
- Craspedacusta Lankester, 1880
- Cubaia Mayer, 1894
- Eperetmus Bigelow, 1915
- Gonionemus A. Agassiz, 1862
- Gossea L. Agassiz, 1862
- Hexaphilia Gershwin & Zeidler, 2003
- Limnocnida Günther, 1893
- Maeotias Ostroumoff, 1896
- Nauarchus Bigelow, 1912
- Olindias Mueller, 1861
- Scolionema Kishinouye, 1910
- Vallentinia Browne, 1902
