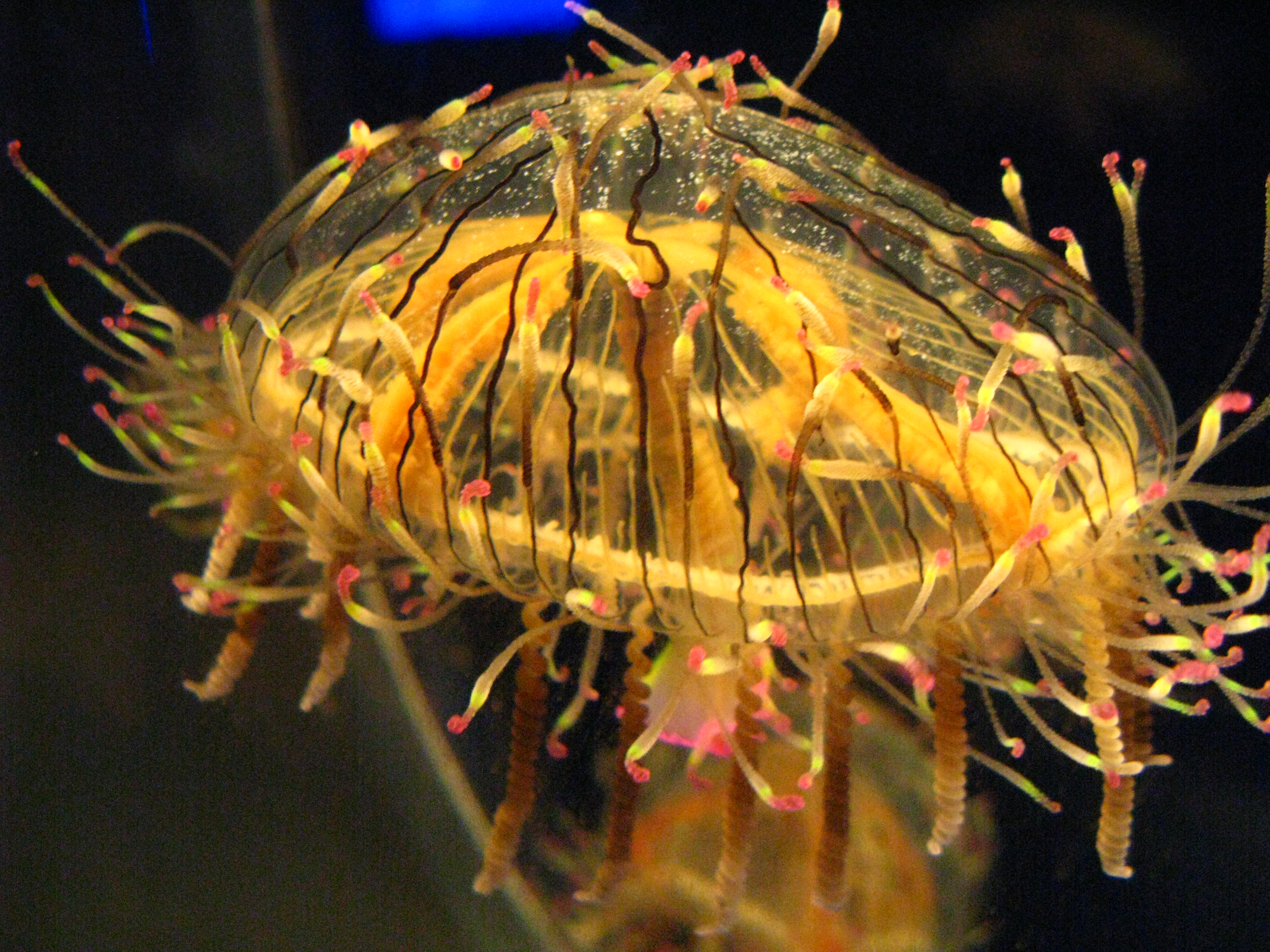
- Olindias formosa

Scientific classification
- Kingdom: Animalia
- Phylum: Cnidaria
- Class: Hydrozoa
- Subclass: Trachylinae
- Order: Limnomedusae; Kramp, 1938

= Limnomedusae =

Order of hydrozoans

Limnomedusae is an order of hydrozoans.

== Taxonomy ==
The taxon was erected by Danish marine biologist Paul Lassenius Kramp in 1938 to accommodate certain families of hydrozoans with biphasic life histories. It includes genera with medusae with ecto-endodermal statocysts and with gonads alongside their radial canals, and also genera which have polyps that are not covered by a theca. Molecular analysis performed by Collins in 2006 has since shown that the Limnomedusae are not monophylic. The family Armorhydridae, which contains a single genus and a single species, Armorhydra janowiczi, is found living in coarse sediment, has hollow tentacles and has no radial canals. It seems to share few morphological features with the other families and probably belongs elsewhere. The inclusion of Microhydrulidae is also dubious. The medusa stage is not known and the tiny polyp has no tentacles nor mouth.

=== Systematic list ===
The World Register of Marine Species currently lists the following families and genera:

- Family Armorhydridae Swedmark & Teissier, 1958
  - Genus Armorhydra Swedmark & Teissier, 1958

- Family Microhydrulidae Bouillon & Deroux, 1967
  - Genus Microhydrula Valkanov, 1965
  - Genus Rhaptapagis Bouillon & Deroux, 1967

- Family Monobrachiidae Mereschkowsky, 1877
  - Genus Monobrachium Mereschkowsky, 1877

- Family Olindiidae Haeckel, 1879
  - Genus Aglauropsis Mueller, 1865
  - Genus Astrohydra Hashimoto, 1981
  - Genus Calpasoma Fuhrmann, 1939
  - Genus Craspedacusta Lankester, 1880
  - Genus Cubaia Mayer, 1894
  - Genus Eperetmus Bigelow, 1915
  - Genus Gonionemus A. Agassiz, 1862
  - Genus Gossea L. Agassiz, 1862
  - Genus Hexaphilia Gershwin & Zeidler, 2003
  - Genus Limnocnida Günther, 1893
  - Genus Maeotias Ostroumoff, 1896
  - Genus Nauarchus Bigelow, 1912
  - Genus Olindias Mueller, 1861
  - Genus Scolionema Kishinouye, 1910
  - Genus Vallentinia Browne, 1902
