= Pak Puan =

Coordinates: 17.3639°N 101.7473°E

Pak Puan (Thai: ปากปวน, pronounced [pàːk pūa̯n]) is a sub-district municipality (Thesaban Tambon) in Wang Saphung District, Loei Province. It covers the complete same-named subdistrict.

== Etymology ==
"Pak" refers to the source of water flowing in the rivers. "Puan" comes from the gap among grass or mud, floating above the water that fish or animals use for respiration. People in Pak Puan refer to this village as "Paew". The village is on the Puan stream which flows into the Loei River.

== Geography ==
Neighboring sub-districts are (from the north clockwise) Na Pong of Mueang Loei District, Wang Saphung, Pha Noi, and Khao Luang of Wang Saphung District. Pak Puan occupies a plain 44 km^{2} (22,635 acres) in area. The Loei River flows through every village.

== Administration ==
The local government of Pak Puan was created as a sub-district administrative organization (SAO) on 2 March 1996 and elevated to sub-district municipality on 24 August 2012. The sub-district is subdivided into 12 villages.

No.	Name	Thai
1.	Pak Puan	ปากปวน
2.	Bung Takhai	บุ่งตาข่าย
3.	Non Sawang	โนนสว่าง
4.	Wang Dua	วังเดื่อ
5.	Pa Pao	ป่าเป้า
6.	Kok Kluea	กกเกลือ
7.	Tha Thit Hueang	ท่าทิศเฮือง
8.	Pak Puan	ปากปวน
9.	Kut Ngong	กุดโง้ง
10.	Pak Puan	ปากปวน
11.	Pak Puan	ปากปวน
12.	Pa Pao	ป่าเป้า

== Festivals ==
Pak Puan is the leading chili pepper producing area in Loei Province. A Chili Day Festival is celebrated every year for promoting chili plants in Pak Puan and supporting the traditions of the locality. In 1989, the Chili Day Festival was cancelled due to a chili shortage. The reason was that jobs elsewhere proved more lucrative than growing chilis. In 1997, when Thailand had an economic crisis, unemployed people came back to Pak Puan to grow chilis. But when planting chilis is popular in Pak Puan, supply drives down the prices growers receive, forcing them into other occupations thus lowering the supply of chilis.
