= Pha Nok Khao =

Pha Nok Khao ผานกเค้า
- Tambon
- Pha Nok Khao
- Etymology: "the owl cliff"
- Interactive map of Pha Nok Khao
- Coordinates: 16°50′52.4″N 101°56′32.1″E
- Country: Thailand
- Province: Loei
- District: Phu Kradueng
- Named for: Nok Khao Cliff

Government
  - Type: Subdistrict Administrative Organization (SAO)
  - Mayor: Veerasak Viriyaphon
  - Vice mayor: Chamras Vorachina

Area
  - Total: 144 km^{2} (56 sq mi)

Population
  - Total: 8,140
- Time zone: UTC+7 (ICT)
- Postcode: 42180
- Area code: (+66) 02

Pha Nok Khao (Thai: ผานกเค้า, pronounced [pʰǎː nók kʰáw]) is a tambon (subdistrict) of Phu Kradueng District, Loei Province.

== Toponymy ==
Pha Nok Khao is well known as "Gateway to Phu Kradueng", a well known natural attraction of Loei Province. Pha Nok Khao is a local steep cliff that resembles an owl. Hence the name (Pha is cliff or mountain, Nok Khao is owl). The cliff resembles a beak pointing upwards, looks like a crest. Next, below is a round stone that curves low from the crest down to the head. It is outstanding cliff on the side of the road (Highway 12 and 201, also known as Maliwan Road) between two provinces of Isan region, Khon Kaen and Loei.

Owing it is the way up to Phu Kradueng, so it has restaurants and cafés available to tourists. It is also a point to get on and off the bus in itself.

== Geography ==
Pha Nok Khao has a mountainous terrain alternating with plains. Most of the area is in the National Forest. It is about 8 km (5.0 mi) east from Phu Kradueng downtown.

It is bounded by other areas (from the north clockwise): Pha Khao in its province, Si Bun Rueang of Nong Bua Lamphu Province and Si Chomphu of Khon Kaen, Huai Som and Phu Kradueng in its district.

== Administration ==
Subdistrict Administrative Organization Pha Nok Khao (SAO Pha Nok Khao) governs areas beyond the jurisdiction of the Phu Kradueng Subdistrict Municipality.

It was also divided into 14 mubans (villages)

No.	Name	Thai
1.	Ban Pha Nok Khao	บ้านผานกเค้า
2.	Ban Wang Phai	บ้านวังไผ่
3.	Ban Si Sakda	บ้านศรีศักดา
4.	Ban Pha Sam Yot	บ้านผาสามยอด
5.	Ban Chong Fang	บ้านช่องฝาง
6.	Ban Si Raksa	บ้านศรีรักษา
7.	Ban Huai Som Tai	บ้านห้วยส้มใต้
8.	Ban Wang Lan	บ้านวังลาน
9.	Ban Huai Mak	บ้านห้วยหมาก
10.	Ban Sam Hi	บ้านซำไฮ
11.	Ban Huai Kho Khao	บ้านห้วยก่อขาว
12.	Ban Phon Thong	บ้านพลทอง
13.	Ban Maliwan	บ้านมะลิวัลย์
14.	Ban Wang Thong	บ้านวังทอง

The emblem of SAO Pha Nok Khao shows Pha Nok Khao, below is a handshake symbol.

== Economy ==
- Sugar cane is a local cash crop.
