= 2014 Loei gold mine mob attack =

The 2014 Loei Gold Mine Mob Attack was an alleged attack by some 300 armed, masked men on villagers occupying three checkpoints blocking access to a controversial gold mine in the village of Ban Na Nong Bong, Khao Luang Sub-district, Wang Saphung District of Loei Province, Thailand. The attack took place on the night of 15 May 2014.

== Background ==
Residents of Na Nong Bong and five neighbouring villages have been embroiled in a long-running dispute with a gold mine operated by Tungkum Limited (TKL), a subsidiary of Tongkah Harbour PCL, after which they blocked the entrance road to the mine with trucks. The gold mine was accused of poisoning the villagers' land and water supplies and causing serious health problems.

About 300 men, wearing balaclavas and carrying sticks, knives and guns, went on the rampage in Ban Na Nong Bong from 22:00 on 15 May to 05:00 the following day. Wearing black and white ski masks and armed with guns, knives and clubs, up to 400 men rounded up and beat 40 people, including women, in the village near the northern border with Laos. They covered villagers' eyes, bound their ankles and wrists, and beat them. They treated us like we weren't human, one villager, Pauntip Hongchai, told Reuters. Yon Khunna, who was watchman for the village on Thursday night, said the men tied his hands and beat him up for hours. "I was released just at 4.30am [sic]," he said.

The Network of Lecturers and Students for Society and the Environment issued a statement condemning the attack. "This is a grave violation against human rights and community rights". The environmental organization, Ecological Alert and Recovery — Thailand (EARTH), has also issued a statement. Police were no help, showing up only after the fact, which didn't surprise the villagers who identified the leaders of the armed gang as Lt Gen Poramet Pomnak and his son Poramin. Loei Governor Wirot Jiwarangsan said the latest incident resulted from a conflict between the mine operator and the villagers, making it sound like an attack by 300 thugs was something to be expected. The Bangkok Post hinted at military impunity and knowledge of the upcoming 2014 Thailand coup as factors fuelling the incident.

== Aftermath ==
In the village there has been little effort to restore the land and water quality to acceptable standards. The government reportedly planted a few trees that later died, and leveled the landscape. As for contaminated water, a governmental official explained that, even though it has been proved that there is contaminated water in Ban Na Nong Bong and that villagers blood contains high levels of heavy metals, it has not been shown that this is due to gold mining. The Pollution Control Department has not confirmed the cause of contamination, despite the correlation between cyanide in the mining process and cyanide in the water. They simply point out that mining can sometimes accelerate the surfacing of dangerous metals.
