= Laos–Thailand border =

International border

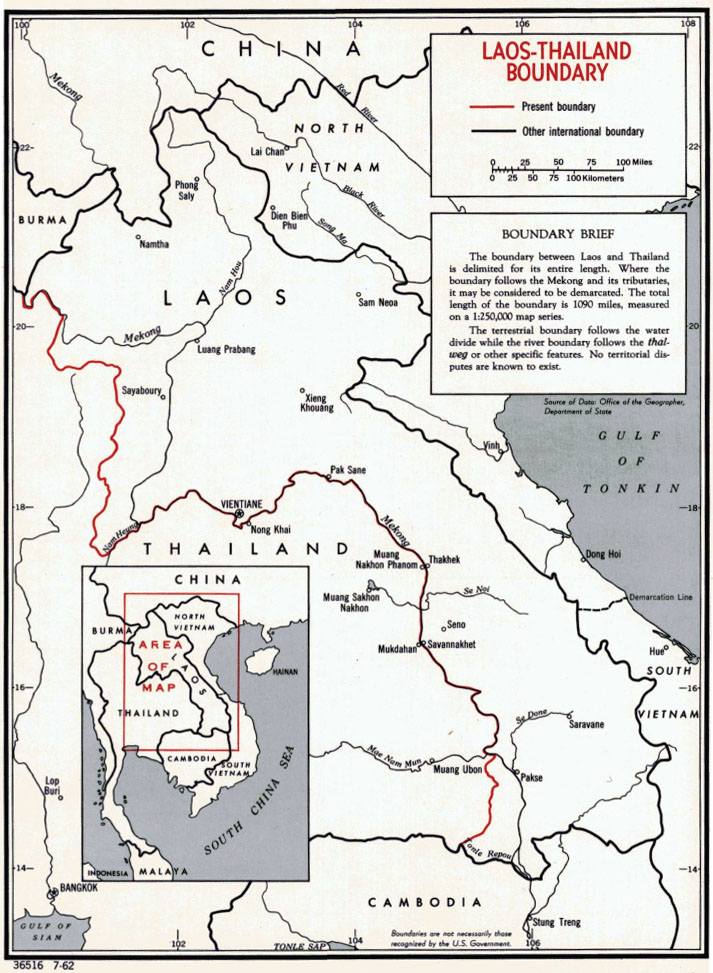
Map of the Laos–Thailand border

The Laos–Thailand border is the international border between the territory of Laos and Thailand. The border is 1,845 km (1,146 mi) in length, over half of which follows the Mekong River, and runs from the tripoint with Myanmar in the north to tripoint with Cambodia in the south.

== Description ==
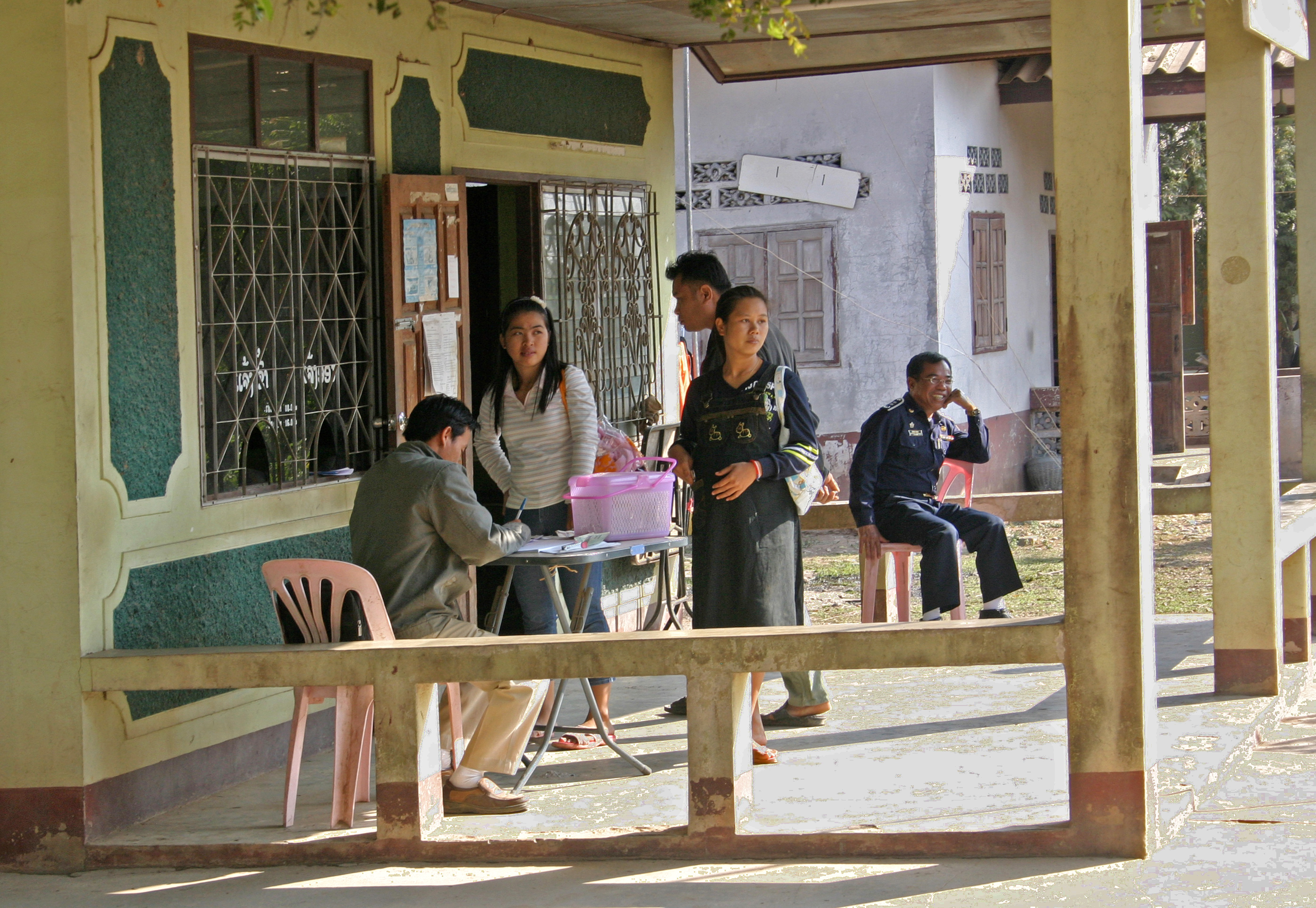
Tonpheung border checkpoint (2007)

The border starts in the north at the tripoint with Myanmar at the confluence of the Kok River and Mekong River, following the latter towards the south-east. It then leaves the river and proceeds overland in a broadly southwards direction over various hill ridges, down to the Hueang River. It then follows this river to the north-east up to the confluence with the Mekong, from where it follows the Mekong for the majority of the border's length. Just north-west of Pakse the border leaves the Mekong and then follows the ridge of the Dângrêk Mountains south the tripoint with Cambodia.

== History ==
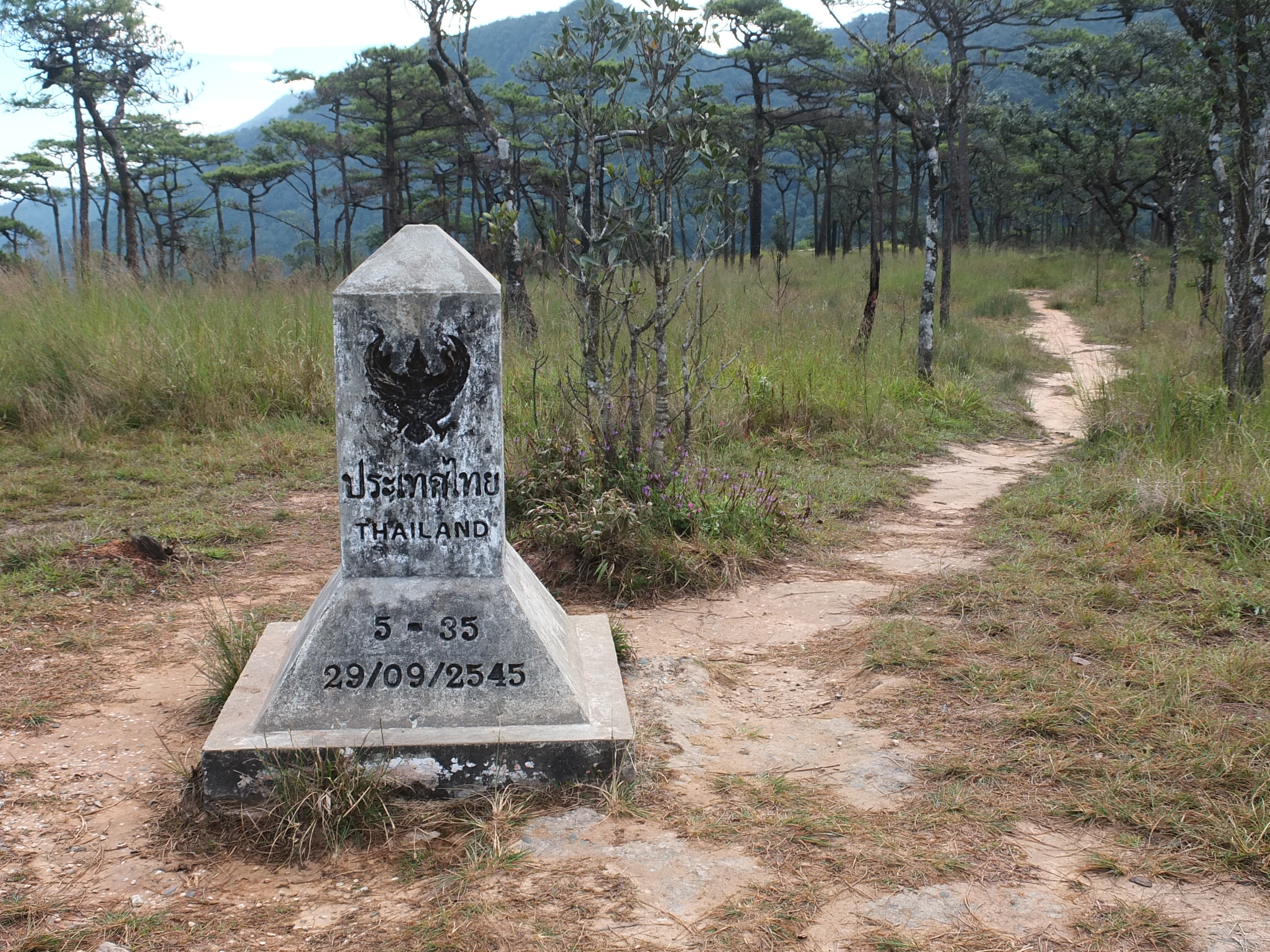
A pillar marking the border (2002)

For centuries, the Mekong River did not act as a rigid international border, but rather as a lifeline connecting communities sharing deep cultural, linguistic, and historical ties. In the mid-19th century, the Lao kingdoms and parts of Cambodia existed as tributary states under the suzerainty of the Kingdom of Siam (modern-day Thailand). This traditional Asian system of overlapping loyalties was shattered by the arrival of French gunboat diplomacy. Beginning in the 1860s, France established a firm foothold in Cambodia, officially consolidating these territories into the colony of French Indochina in 1887, seeking to expand its empire to the natural boundary of the Mekong River. France provoked the Franco-Siamese Crisis of 1893, as the French warships sailed up the Chao Phraya River, threatening Bangkok and forcing Siam to cede all territorial claims east of the Mekong including Laos to the French due to colonial pressures continued over the next decade. Through a series of unequal treaties enforced in 1904 and 1907, a vulnerable Siam was compelled to cede strategic territories west of the Mekong as well, including modern-day Sainyabuli, Champasak, and portions of northern Cambodia. A minor treaty of 1926 Franco-Siamese Convention have finally settled the micro-sovereignty of the shifting islets within the Mekong River itself. The geopolitical equilibrium fractured during World War II. Following the Fall of Paris in 1940, Vichy France maintained nominal control over Indochina but was heavily compromised. Sensing imperial weakness, Thailand under the militaristic leadership of Plaek Phibunsongkhram launched the Franco-Thai War, supported by Imperial Japan, Thailand successfully reclaimed the ceded territories of Cambodia and Laos. This triumph was short-lived. Following Japan's total defeat in 1945, the international community annulled wartime territorial transfers of the pre-war colonial borders were strictly reinstated, forcing Thailand to return the lands to French administration. The post-war era witnessed the irreversible decline of European colonialism. Laos achieved partial autonomy within the French Union in 1949 and finally secured complete independence on 22 October 1953, followed by the Kingdom of Cambodia on 9 November that same year. The former French colonial lines were instantly transformed into international borders between fully sovereign states.

As the Cold War raged on between the two superpowers like the United States and the Soviet Union (until the Soviet collapse in 1991), the fall of French colonial rule and the American imperialism had shattered the geopolitical landscape of Southeast Asia which led the rise of Marxist–Leninist regimes through Indochina such as the Fall of Phnom Penh to the Khmer Rouge (Cambodian Reds) on 17 April, led to the establishment of Democratic Kampuchea on 5 January 1976, the Fall of Saigon to the Viet Cong on 30 April, had led to the unification of Vietnam as the Socialist Republic of Vietnam by renaming Saigon into "Ho Chi Minh City" in honor of the late revolutionary leader on 2 July 1976 and the victory of Pathet Lao in Vientiane on 2 December 1975 by renaming the country of "Lao People's Democratic Republic" had transformed Thailand into the ultimate frontline state of the Western world's "Asian Domino Theory". Thailand's borders are surrounded by newly declared communist regimes backed by the Soviet Union and China had doubled down on its constitutional monarchy and military alliance with the United States and the Western allies. While the 1976 friendship treaties attempted to codify peace, they could not erase decades of deep-seated territorial trauma.However fighting broke out in 1984 over disputed villages adjacent to the frontier in Sainyabuli/Uttaradit Province, and again in 1987–88 over a nearby area. A joint committee was established in 1991 which aimed to resolve the dispute peacefully, however discussions dragged on throughout the decade. The First Thai–Lao Friendship Bridge was opened on 4 April 1994. A joint boundary commission was established in 1997, however its work was suspended in 1998 following the Asian financial crisis. As of 2018 border demarcation is still ongoing.

== Border crossings ==
As of 2019, there were 20 permanent border crossings and 29 checkpoints for border trade.

=== Permanent border crossings ===
No	Laos	Thailand		Notes
No	Border post	Border post	Opening hours	Notes
1	Houayxay, Houayxay district, Bokeo	Chiang Khong Pier, Chiang Khong district, Chiang Rai	0800 - 1800	Ferry border crossing.
2	Mittaphab 4, Ban Don, Houayxay district, Bokeo	Chiang Khong, Chiang Khong district, Chiang Rai	0600 - 2200	Border across the Fourth Thai–Lao Friendship Bridge.
3	Tonpheung, Ton Pheung district, Bokeo	Chiang Saen Pier, Chiang Saen district, Chiang Rai	0800 - 1800	Ferry border crossing.
4	Golden Triangle, Ton Pheung district, Bokeo	Golden Triangle, Ban Sop Ruak, Chiang Saen district, Chiang Rai	0600 - 2000	Ferry border crossing.
5	Pang Mon, Khop district, Sainyabuli	Ban Huak, Phu Sang district, Phayao	0600 - 1800	
6	Ban Nam Ngeun, Ngeun district, Sainyabuli	Ban Huai Kon, Chaloem Phra Kiat district, Nan	0800 - 2000	
7	Pha Keo, Parklai district, Sainyabuli	Phu Doo, Ban Khok district, Uttaradit	0600 - 2000	
8	Nam Hueang, Kenethao district, Sainyabuli	Ban Na Kraseng, Tha Li district, Loei	0700 - 1800	Border across the Nam Hueang Thai–Lao Friendship Bridge.
9	Kenethao, Kenethao district, Sainyabuli	Ban Pak Huai, Tha Li district, Loei	0800 - 1800	Ferry border crossing.
10	Xanakharm, Xanakharm district, Vientiane Province	Chiang Khan, Chiang Khan district, Loei	0800 - 1800	Ferry border crossing.
11	Ban Wang, Xanakharm district, Vientiane Province	Ban Khok Phai, Pak Chom district, Loei	0800 - 1600	Ferry border crossing.
12	Tha Dua, Hadxayfong district, Vientiane Prefecture	Tha Sadet, Mueang Nong Khai district, Nong Khai	0800 - 1800	Ferry border crossing.
13	Mittaphab 1, Ban Dongphosy, Hadxayfong district, Vientiane Prefecture	Nong Khai, Mueang Nong Khai district, Nong Khai	0600 - 2200	Road and railway border crossing. Border across the First Thai–Lao Friendship Bridge. Train services operational between Nong Khai railway station and Khamsavath railway station.
14	Pakxan Pier, Pakxan district, Bolikhamsai	Bueng Kan Pier, Mueang Bueng Kan district, Bueng Kan	0800 - 1800	Ferry border crossing.
15	Thakhek, Thakhek district, Khammouane	Nakhon Phanom Pier, Mueang Nakhon Phanom district, Nakhon Phanom	0600 - 1800	Ferry border crossing.
16	Mittaphab 3, Thakhek district, Khammouane	Nakhon Phanom, Mueang Nakhon Phanom district, Nakhon Phanom	0600 - 2200	Border across the Third Thai–Lao Friendship Bridge.
17	Xayaphoum Pier, Kaysone Phomvihane district, Savannakhet	Mukdahan Pier, Mueang Mukdahan district, Mukdahan	0600 - 1800	Ferry border crossing.
18	Mittaphab 2, Kaysone Phomvihane district, Savannakhet	Mukdahan, Mueang Mukdahan district, Mukdahan	0600 - 2200	Border across the Second Thai–Lao Friendship Bridge.
19	Paktaphan, Lakhonepheng district, Salavan	Ban Pak Saeng, Na Tan district, Ubon Ratchathani	0800 - 1800	Ferry border crossing.
20	Vang Tao, Phonthong district, Champasak	Chong Mek, Sirindhorn district, Ubon Ratchathani	0600 - 2000	

Laotian and Thai boundary markers

=== Checkpoints for border trade ===
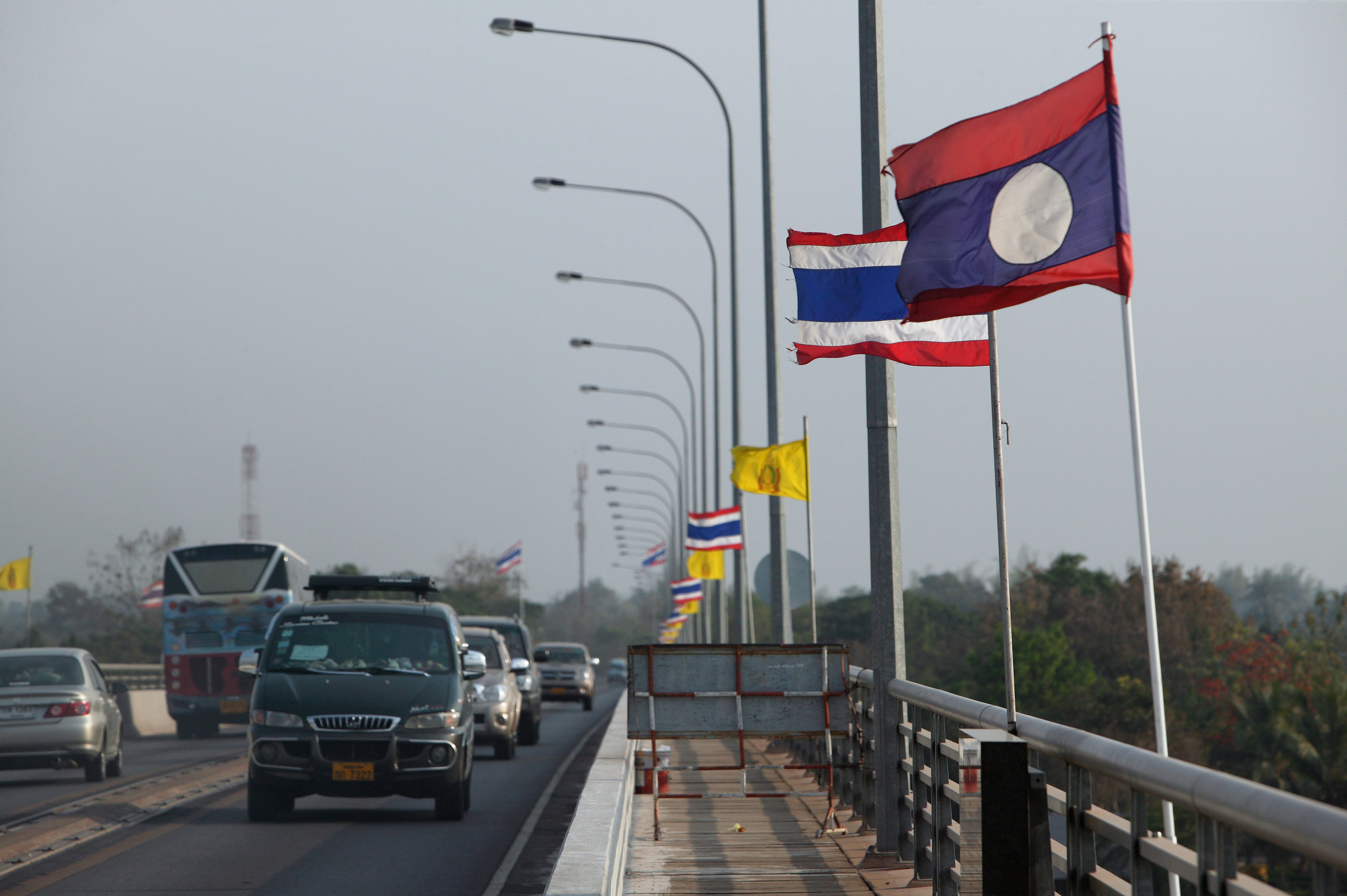
The First Thai–Lao Friendship bridge

These border crossings are open for cross-border local trade only. There are 29 checkpoints for border trade officially recognized by the Ministry of Interior, located in provinces. Entering the opposite country beyond these checkpoints and their associated markets is illegal.

== See also ==
- Laos–Thailand relations
