= Ahi subdistrict =

Subdistrict in Loei Province

Coordinates: 17.664714°N 101.35490°E

A Hi อาฮี
- Subdistrict
- Interactive map of A Hi
- Country: Thailand
- Province: Loei
- District: Tha Li

Population (2017)
  - Total: 4,615
- Time zone: UTC+7 (ICT)
- Postal code: 42140
- TIS 1099: 420803

A Hi (Thai: อาฮี, pronounced [ʔāːhīː]) is a tambon (subdistrict) of Tha Li District, in Loei Province, Thailand. In 2017, it had a population of 4,615 people.

== Administration ==
=== Central administration ===
The tambon is divided into six administrative villages (mubans).

No.	Name	Thai
1.	Ban A Hi	บ้านอาฮี
2.	Ban Huai Khang	บ้านห้วยคัง
3.	Ban Nam Phan	บ้านน้ำพาน
4.	Ban Na Kraseng	บ้านนากระเซ็ง
5.	Ban Nong Pokti	บ้านหนองปกติ
6.	Ban A Hi	บ้านอาฮี

=== Local administration ===
The area of the subdistrict is covered by the subdistrict administrative organization (SAO) A Hi (องค์การบริหารส่วนตำบลอาฮี).
