= Nam Nao district =

Nam Nao น้ำหนาว
- District
- District location in Phetchabun province
- Coordinates: 16°46′6″N 101°40′18″E
- Country: Thailand
- Province: Phetchabun
- Seat: Nam Nao

Area
  - Total: 620.0 km^{2} (239.4 sq mi)

Population (2000)
  - Total: 15,485
  - Density: 25/km^{2} (65/sq mi)
- Time zone: UTC+7 (ICT)
- Postal code: 67260
- Geocode: 6709

Nam Nao (Thai: น้ำหนาว, pronounced [náːm nǎːw]) is the northeasternmost district (amphoe) of Phetchabun province, northern Thailand.

== History ==
On 16 November 1978 the tambons Nam Nao and Lak Dan were split from Lom Sak district and made into a minor district (king amphoe). It was upgraded to a full district on 19 July 1991.

== Geography ==
Neighboring districts are (from the north clockwise) Phu Luang and Phu Kradueng of Loei province, Phu Pha Man of Khon Kaen province, Khon San of Chaiyaphum province, and Lom Sak and Lom Kao of Phetchabun Province. The district's east side borders Phu Kradueng Mountain.

Nam Nao National Park is in the district.

== Administration ==
The district is divided into four sub-districts (tambons), which are further subdivided into 30 villages (mubans). There are no municipal (thesabana) in the district. There are four tambon administrative organizations (TAO).

1.	Nam Nao	น้ำหนาว
2.	Lak Dan	หลักด่าน
3.	Wang Kwang	วังกวาง
4.	Khok Mon	โคกมน
