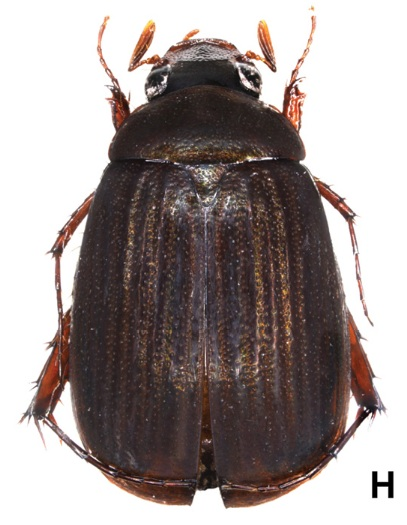

Scientific classification
- Kingdom: Animalia
- Phylum: Arthropoda
- Clade: Pancrustacea
- Class: Insecta
- Order: Coleoptera
- Suborder: Polyphaga
- Infraorder: Scarabaeiformia
- Family: Scarabaeidae
- Genus: Tetraserica
- Species: T. phukradungensis

Binomial name
- Tetraserica phukradungensis Fabrizi, Dalstein & Ahrens, 2019

= Tetraserica phukradungensis =

Species of beetle

Tetraserica phukradungensis is a species of beetle of the family Scarabaeidae. It is found in Thailand.

== Description ==
Adults reach a length of about 9.1 mm. The surface of the labroclypeus and the disc of the frons are glabrous. The smooth area anterior to the eye is twice as wide as long.

== Etymology ==
The species is named after the type locality, Phu Kradung.
