= Phu Kradueng district =

Phu Kradueng ภูกระดึง
- District
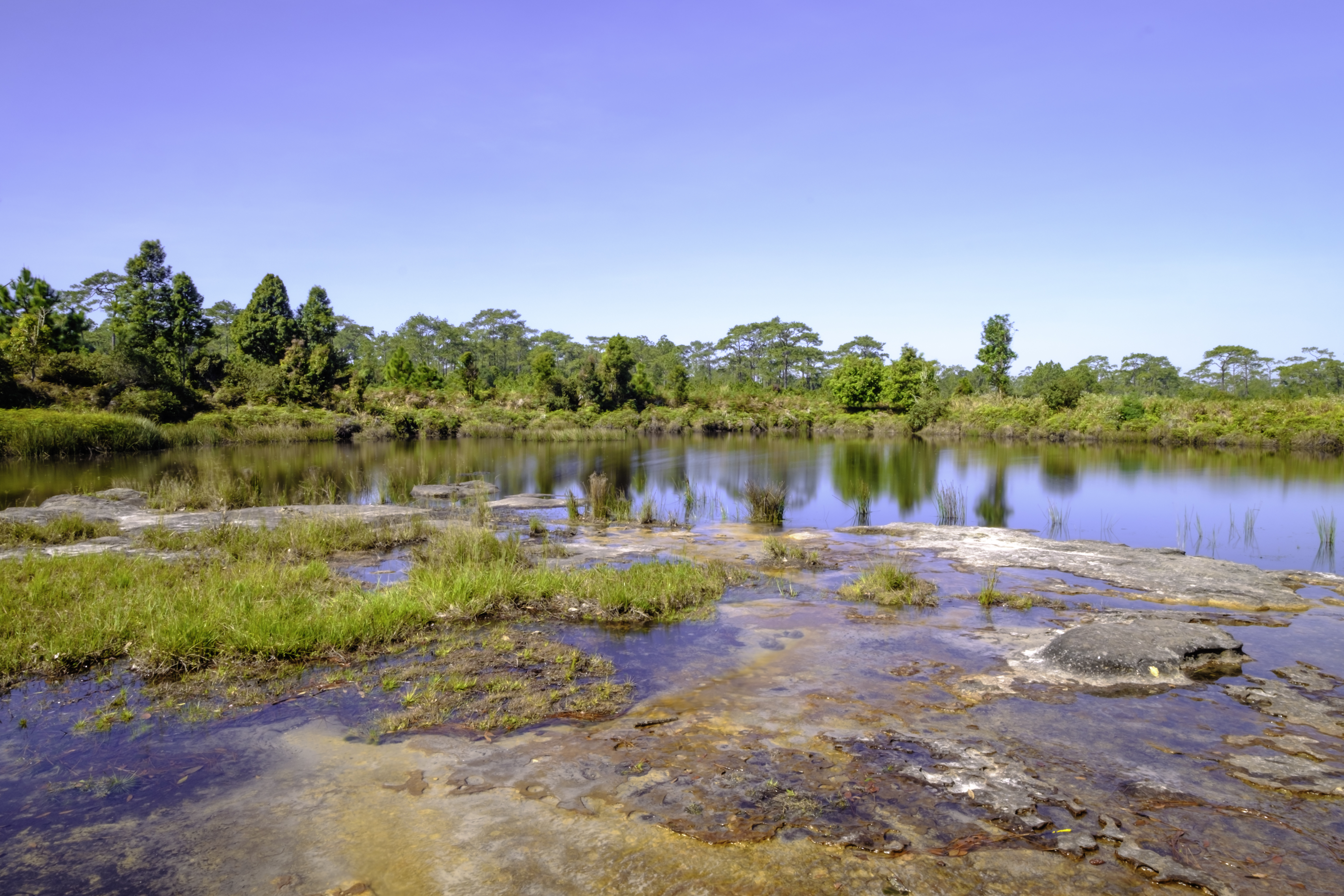

- District location in Loei province
- Coordinates: 16°53′3″N 101°53′4″E
- Country: Thailand
- Province: Loei
- Seat: Phu Kradueng

Area
  - Total: 709.0 km^{2} (273.7 sq mi)

Population (2005)
  - Total: 33,438
  - Density: 47.2/km^{2} (122/sq mi)
- Time zone: UTC+7 (ICT)
- Postal code: 42180
- Geocode: 4210

Phu Kradueng (Thai: ภูกระดึง, pronounced [pʰūː krādɯ̄ŋ]) is a district (amphoe) of Loei province, in northeastern Thailand.

== Geography ==
Neighboring districts are (from the north clockwise): Phu Luang, Nong Hin, and Pha Khao of Loei Province; Si Bun Rueang of Nong Bua Lamphu province; Si Chomphu, Chum Phae, and Phu Pha Man of Khon Kaen province; and Nam Nao of Phetchabun province.

Phu Kradueng mountain is in the district.

== History ==
The minor district (king amphoe) was created on 1 January 1962, when the three tambons, Si Than, Puan Phu, and Pha Khao, were split off from Wang Saphung district. It was upgraded to a full district on 16 July 1963.

== Administration ==
The district is divided into four sub-districts (tambons), which are further subdivided into 54 villages (mubans). Phu Kradueng is a township (thesaban tambon) which covers parts of tambons Si Than, Pha Nok Khao, and Phu Kradueng. There are a further four tambon administrative organizations (TAO).

No.	Name	Thai name	Villages	Pop.
1.	Si Than	ศรีฐาน	16	10,963
5.	Pha Nok Khao	ผานกเค้า	14	8,140
7.	Phu Kradueng	ภูกระดึง	13	7,698
10.	Huai Som	ห้วยส้ม	11	6,637

Missing numbers are tambons which now form the Districts Pha Khao and Nong Hin.
