= Loei =

Loei เลย
- Town
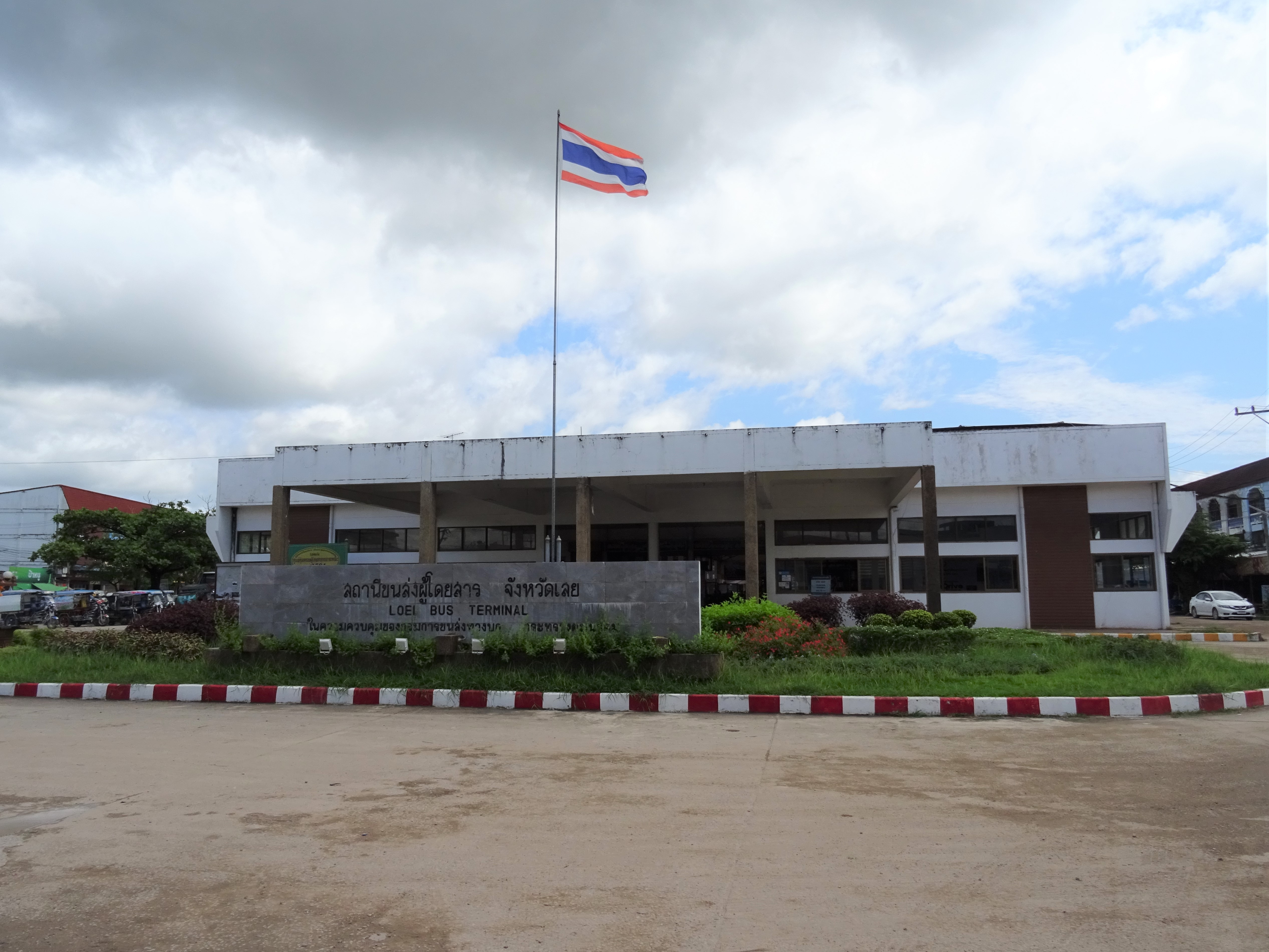
- Loei bus station

- Location within Thailand
- Coordinates: 17°29′7″N 101°43′49″E
- Country: Thailand
- Provinces: Loei province
- District: Mueang Loei district
- Subdistrict: Kut Pong
- Elevation: 253 m (830 ft)

Population (2017)
  - Total: 21,013
- Time zone: UTC+7 (ICT)

Loei (Thai: เลย; pronounced [lɤ̄ːj]) is a town (thesaban mueang) in northeast Thailand. Loei covers the whole tambon of Mueang Loei district and is the capital of Loei province. In 2017, Loei had a population of 21,013. Loei lies 545 km north-northeast of Bangkok, 150 km west of Udon Thani.

== Geography ==
Loei is in the fertile valley of the Loei River, which runs from south to north through the eastern part of the town. A range of hills lies to the east, including Phu Bo Bit Forest Park, about 3 kilometres (1.9 mi) from the town centre.

== Climate ==
Loei has a tropical savanna climate (Köppen climate classification Aw). Winters are quite dry and very warm. Temperatures rise until April, which is hot with the average daily maximum at 36.0 °C (96.8 °F). The monsoon season is from late April to October, with heavy rain and somewhat cooler temperatures during the day, although nights remain warm.

Climate data for Loei (1991–2020, extremes 1954-present)
Month	Jan	Feb	Mar	Apr	May	Jun	Jul	Aug	Sep	Oct	Nov	Dec	Year
Record high °C (°F)	36.9 (98.4)	40.5 (104.9)	41.3 (106.3)	43.5 (110.3)	43.8 (110.8)	40.2 (104.4)	39.0 (102.2)	37.5 (99.5)	36.2 (97.2)	37.4 (99.3)	36.4 (97.5)	35.0 (95.0)	43.8 (110.8)
Mean daily maximum °C (°F)	30.2 (86.4)	32.9 (91.2)	35.2 (95.4)	36.0 (96.8)	34.3 (93.7)	33.4 (92.1)	32.6 (90.7)	32.0 (89.6)	31.7 (89.1)	31.4 (88.5)	30.9 (87.6)	29.3 (84.7)	32.5 (90.5)
Daily mean °C (°F)	22.2 (72.0)	24.3 (75.7)	27.1 (80.8)	28.5 (83.3)	28.0 (82.4)	28.1 (82.6)	27.7 (81.9)	27.2 (81.0)	26.7 (80.1)	26.0 (78.8)	24.2 (75.6)	21.9 (71.4)	26.0 (78.8)
Mean daily minimum °C (°F)	15.6 (60.1)	17.1 (62.8)	20.3 (68.5)	22.8 (73.0)	23.9 (75.0)	24.4 (75.9)	24.2 (75.6)	24.0 (75.2)	23.4 (74.1)	22.0 (71.6)	18.9 (66.0)	16.0 (60.8)	21.1 (69.9)
Record low °C (°F)	0.1 (32.2)	6.6 (43.9)	9.3 (48.7)	14.7 (58.5)	19.5 (67.1)	21.4 (70.5)	20.5 (68.9)	20.0 (68.0)	18.6 (65.5)	12.6 (54.7)	5.7 (42.3)	2.2 (36.0)	0.1 (32.2)
Average precipitation mm (inches)	7.6 (0.30)	13.9 (0.55)	40.4 (1.59)	94.2 (3.71)	188.5 (7.42)	164.0 (6.46)	160.5 (6.32)	204.9 (8.07)	239.8 (9.44)	109.5 (4.31)	21.3 (0.84)	11.4 (0.45)	1,256 (49.4)
Average precipitation days (≥ 1.0 mm)	1.1	1.7	3.9	7.3	13.1	12.7	13.1	15.1	15.7	7.8	2.1	0.7	94.3
Average relative humidity (%)	68.6	63.1	61.6	66.7	76.1	77.1	77.8	80.0	83.3	79.6	74.4	71.0	73.3
Average dew point °C (°F)	15.3 (59.5)	15.7 (60.3)	17.9 (64.2)	20.8 (69.4)	22.9 (73.2)	23.3 (73.9)	23.1 (73.6)	23.2 (73.8)	23.4 (74.1)	21.8 (71.2)	18.8 (65.8)	15.8 (60.4)	20.2 (68.4)
Mean monthly sunshine hours	245.6	240.9	241.3	227.7	194.4	158.1	130.2	128.5	148.8	196.6	221.9	233.8	2,367.8
Source 1: World Meteorological Organization, Meteomanz (record)
Source 2: Thai Meteorological Department (extremes)

== Transportation ==
Route 201 leads from Chiang Khan in the north on the border with Laos, through Loei, to Non Sa-at near Chum Phae. Route 203 leads west to the vicinity of Phu Ruea, and then turns south to Lom Sak.

Loei is served by Loei Airport.
