= Nong Hin district =

Nong Hin นคร หนองหิน
- District
- District location in Loei province
- Coordinates: 17°7′24″N 101°51′30″E
- Country: Thailand
- Province: Loei
- Seat: Nong Hin

Area
  - Total: 435.0 km^{2} (168.0 sq mi)

Population (2005)
  - Total: 23,255
  - Density: 53.5/km^{2} (139/sq mi)
- Time zone: UTC+7 (ICT)
- Postal code: 42190
- Geocode: 4214

Nong Hin (Thai: หนองหิน; IPA: [nɔ̌ːŋ hǐn]) is a district (amphoe) of Loei province, in northeastern Thailand.

== Geography ==
Neighboring districts are (from the north clockwise) Wang Saphung, Pha Khao, Phu Kradueng, and Phu Luang.

== History ==
The minor district (king amphoe) was established on 1 July 1997 with territory split off from Phu Kradueng district.

On 15 May 2007, all 81 minor districts in Thailand were upgraded to full districts. On 24 August, the upgrade became official.

== Administration ==
The district is divided into three sub-districts (tambons), which are further subdivided into 34 villages (mubans). Nong Hin is a township (thesaban tambon) which covers parts of tambon Nong Hin. There are a further three tambon administrative organizations (TAO).

No.	Name	Thai name	Villages	Pop.
1.	Nong Hin	หนองหิน	14	9,711
2.	Tat Kha	ตาดข่า	5	4,060
3.	Puan Phu	ปวนพุ	15	9,484
