= Na Duang district =

Na Duang นาด้วง
- District
- District location in Loei province
- Coordinates: 17°28′45″N 101°58′14″E
- Country: Thailand
- Province: Loei
- Seat: Na Duang

Area
  - Total: 590.0 km^{2} (227.8 sq mi)

Population (2005)
  - Total: 25,232
  - Density: 42.8/km^{2} (111/sq mi)
- Time zone: UTC+7 (ICT)
- Postal code: 42210
- Geocode: 4202

Na Duang (Thai: นาด้วง; IPA: [nāː dûaŋ]) is a district (amphoe) in the eastern part of Loei province, in northeastern Thailand.

== History ==
The area of the district was originally Ban Na Duang of Udon Thani province, a village named after the hunter Duang. He led people to establish a new village in 1881. Later the village was assigned to be part of tambon Thung Pho, Mueang Loei district in 1945 and tambon Na Din Dam in 1967. In 1976 it was upgraded to a tambon. Together with three more tambons it formed a minor district (king amphoe) on 17 January 1977. It was upgraded to a full district on 19 July 1991.

== Geography ==
Neighboring districts are (from the south clockwise): Erawan, Mueang Loei, Pak Chom of Loei Province; Nam Som of Udon Thani province; and Suwannakhuha, Na Klang and Na Wang of Nong Bua Lamphu province.

== Administration ==
The district is divided into four sub-districts (tambons), which are further subdivided into 41 villages (mubans). Na Duang is a township (thesaban tambon) which covers parts of tambon Na Duang. There are a further four tambon administrative organizations (TAO).

No.	Name	Thai name	Villages	Pop.
1.	Na Duang	นาด้วง	12	9,359
2.	Na Dok Kham	นาดอกคำ	17	9,433
3.	Tha Sa-at	ท่าสะอาด	7	3,546
4.	Tha Sawan	ท่าสวรรค์	5	2,894
