= Na Haeo district =

Na Haeo นาแห้ว
- District
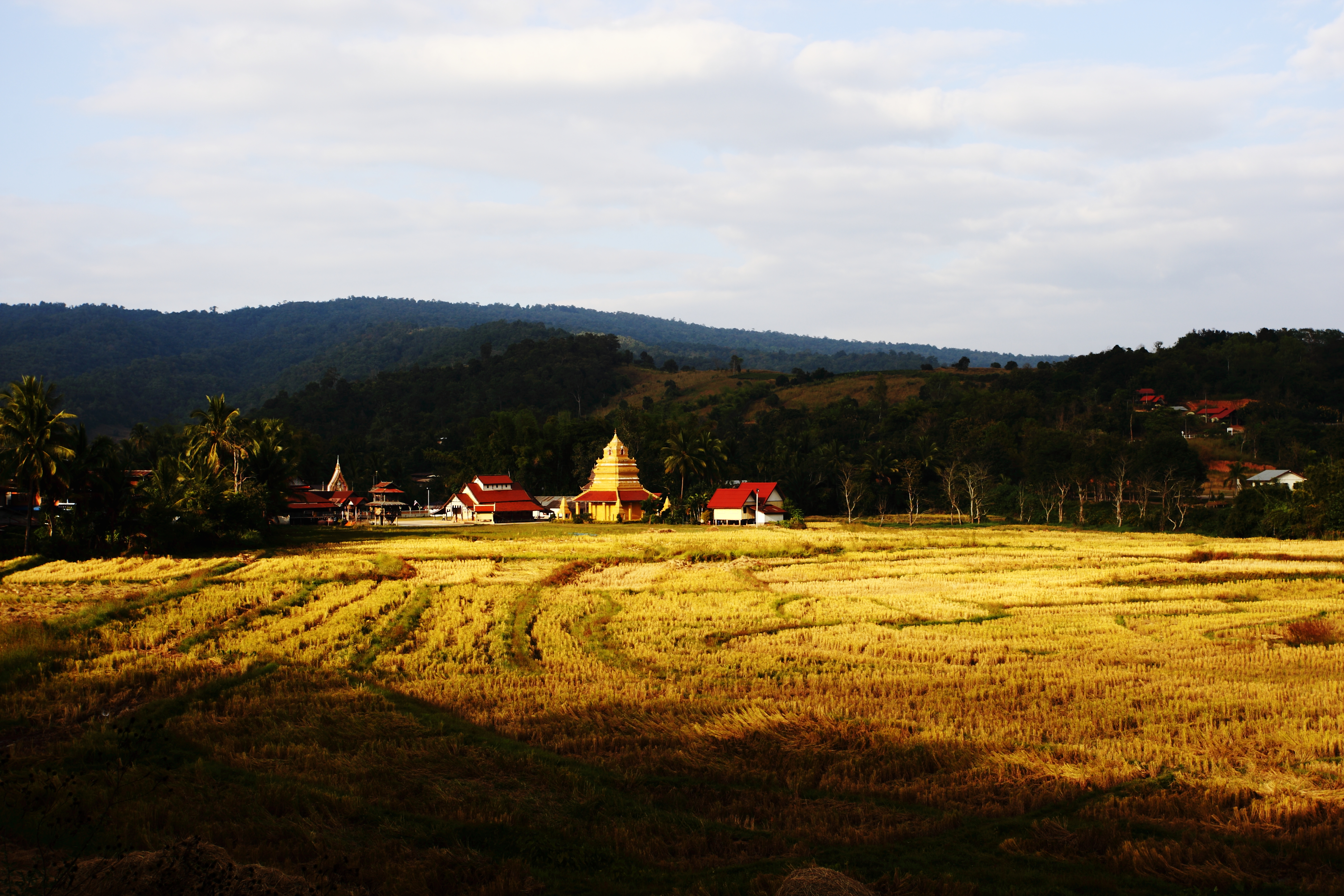

- District location in Loei province
- Coordinates: 17°29′6″N 101°4′12″E
- Country: Thailand
- Province: Loei
- Seat: Na Haeo

Area
  - Total: 628.0 km^{2} (242.5 sq mi)

Population (2005)
  - Total: 11,011
  - Density: 17.5/km^{2} (45/sq mi)
- Time zone: UTC+7 (ICT)
- Postal code: 42170
- Geocode: 4206

Na Haeo (Thai: นาแห้ว; IPA: [nāː hɛ̂w]) is the westernmost district (amphoe) of Loei province, in northeastern Thailand.

== History ==
Na Haeo area was the rural part of the Dan Sai district. It was inconvenient for people in Na Haeo due to the distance involved. The government split off the two tambons Na Haeo and Na Phueng from Dan Sai District and created a minor district (king amphoe) on 15 February 1970. It was upgraded to a full district on 8 September 1976.

Na Haeo is considered the land of a 500-year-old cultural civilization. Therefore, many priceless ancient remains there such as Wat Pho Chai Na Phueng temple in Na Phueng subdistrict. This old temple has beautiful murals in Isan style inside and outside the ordination hall called 'hup taem.' The principal Buddha image has been housed in the temple since it was built over 400 years ago. According to the Fine Arts Department study, construction in Wat Pho Chai Na Phueng and the Buddha image of the temple are over 450 years old.

The present place is the Ban Mueang Phrae market. A marketplace on the Thai-Laos border along the Hueang River, lots of locals are relatives. During King Rama V's reign, the settlement about the borderline between Siam (Thailand at that time) and France was made and since then the other side of the river has become part of Laos.

== Geography ==
Neighboring districts are (from the east clockwise): Dan Sai of Loei Province, Nakhon Thai, and Chat Trakan of Phitsanulok Province. To the north is the Xaignabouli province of Laos.

The important water resource is the Hueang River.

Phu Suan Sai National Park is in this district.

The northern part of the district reaches the southern end of the Luang Prabang Range mountain area of the Thai highlands.

== Administration ==
The district is divided into five subdistricts (tambons), which are further subdivided into 34 villages (mubans). Na Haeo is a township (thesaban tambon) which covers parts of tambon Na Haeo. There are four tambon administrative organizations (TAO).

No.	Name	Thai name	Villages	Pop.
1.	Na Haeo	นาแห้ว	7	2,020
2.	Saeng Pha	แสงภา	6	1,782
3.	Na Phueng	นาพึง	8	2,123
4.	Na Ma La	นามาลา	8	2,920
5.	Lao Ko Hok	เหล่ากอหก	5	2,166
