= Mueang Loei district =

Mueang Loei เมืองเลย
- District
- District location in Loei province
- Coordinates: 17°29′6″N 101°43′48″E
- Country: Thailand
- Province: Loei

Area
  - Total: 1,480.49 km^{2} (571.62 sq mi)

Population (2005)
  - Total: 117,039
  - Density: 79.1/km^{2} (205/sq mi)
- Time zone: UTC+7 (ICT)
- Postal code: 42000
- Geocode: 4201

Mueang Loei (Thai: เมืองเลย; IPA: [mɯ̄aŋ lɤ̄ːj]) is the capital district (amphoe mueang) of Loei province, in northeastern Thailand.

== Location ==
Neighboring districts are (from the north clockwise): Chiang Khan, Pak Chom, Na Duang, Erawan, Wang Saphung, Phu Ruea, and Tha Li of Loei Province.

The important water resource is the Loei River.

== History ==
The district was one of the five original districts of Loei Province established in 1897 during the thesaphiban administrative reforms. At first named Kut Pong after the central tambon, it was later renamed Mueang Loei.

== Administration ==
The district is divided into 14 sub-districts (tambons), which are further subdivided into 130 villages (mubans). The town (thesaban mueang) Loei covers tambon Kut Pong. There are two more townships (thesaban tambons): Na O covers the whole of tambon Na O, and Nam Suai covers parts of tambon Nam Suai. There are a further 13 tambon administrative organizations (TAO).

No.	Name	Thai name	Villages	Pop.
1.	Kut Pong	กุดป่อง	-	22,677
2.	Mueang	เมือง	13	10,678
3.	Na O	นาอ้อ	9	6,051
4.	Kok Du	กกดู่	10	6,567
5.	Nam Man	น้ำหมาน	6	3,612
6.	Siao	เสี้ยว	6	3,287
7.	Na An	นาอาน	12	11,184
8.	Na Pong	นาโป่ง	14	9,609
9.	Na Din Dam	นาดินดำ	14	10,460
10.	Nam Suai	น้ำสวย	11	9,728
11.	Chaiyaphruek	ชัยพฤกษ์	11	6,449
12.	Na Khaem	นาแขม	8	6,642
13.	Si Song Rak	ศรีสองรัก	11	7,610
14.	Kok Thong	กกทอง	5	2,485
