= Erawan district =

Erawan เอราวัณ
- District
- District location in Loei province
- Coordinates: 17°18′36″N 101°56′24″E
- Country: Thailand
- Province: Loei
- Seat: Pha In Plaeng

Area
  - Total: 262.0 km^{2} (101.2 sq mi)

Population (2005)
  - Total: 37,079
  - Density: 141.5/km^{2} (366/sq mi)
- Time zone: UTC+7 (ICT)
- Postal code: 42220
- Geocode: 4213

Erawan (Thai: เอราวัณ; IPA: [ʔēːrāːwān]) is a district (amphoe) in the eastern part of Loei province, in northeastern Thailand.

The district is named after the Erawan Cave in neighboring Na Wang district very near the boundary to Erawan District.

== Geography ==
Neighboring districts are (from the south clockwise): Pha Khao, Wang Saphung, Mueang Loei, and Na Duang of Loei Province; and Na Wang and Si Bun Rueang of Nong Bua Lamphu province.

The main river in the district is the Suai.

== History ==
The minor district (king amphoe) was established on 1 April 1995 with territory split off from Wang Saphung district.

The Thai government on 15 May 2007 upgraded all 81 minor districts to full districts. With publication in the Royal Gazette on 24 August the upgrade became official.

== Symbols ==
The district slogan is "Erawan, large elephant. Area of sweet Longan. Tradition of 100,000 rockets. Land of silk production".

== Administration ==
The district is divided into four sub-districts (tambons), which are further subdivided into 45 villages (mubans). Erawan and Pha In Plaeng are also sub-district municipalities (thesaban tambons), and two tambon administrative organizations (TAO) for the remaining two sub-districts.

No.	Name	Thai name	Villages	Pop.
1.	Erawan	เอราวัณ	16	12,160
2.	Pha In Plaeng	ผาอินทร์แปลง	14	12,532
3.	Pha Sam Yot	ผาสามยอด	8	7,742
4.	Sap Phaiwan	ทรัพย์ไพวัลย์	7	4,645
