= Na Nong Bong =

Coordinates: 17°21′55″N 101°39′54″E

Na Nong Bong นาหนองบง
- Muban
- Interactive map of Na Nong Bong
- Country: Thailand
- Province: Loei
- District: Wang Saphung
- Tambon: Khao Luang

Na Nong Bong (Thai: นาหนองบง) is a village in Khao Luang sub-district, Wang Saphung district, Loei province, Thailand.

== Geography ==
Na Nong Bong is ringed by mountains and thick forests. Farms in the village grow rice, mango, papaya, and banana.

== History ==
In 2006, a gold and copper mine operated by Tungkum Limited (TKL), a subsidiary of Tongkah Harbour PCL, nearby the village entered operation.

=== Khon Rak Ban Kerd Group ===
Residents of the six villages in Khao Luang sub-district (Na Nong Bong, Phu Tab Fah, Huay Puk, Gog Sa Thon, Gang Hin, and Fak Huay) opposed to the mine formed the Khon Rak Ban Kerd Group (KRBKG; Thai: กลุ่มฅนรักษ์บ้านเกิด) in 2007 to protest the mine's operations.

Led by female village elders, including Na Nong Bong's Ranong Kongsaen, the group has organized protests against the mine. The protests were met with lawsuits by the mining company, along with an armed atack on the villages in 2014.

=== 2014 gold mine attack ===
The 2014 Loei Gold Mine Mob Attack was an alleged attack by some 300 armed, masked men on villagers occupying three checkpoints blocking access to a controversial gold mine in Ban Nong Bong. The attack took place on the night of 15 May 2014.

=== Radical Grandma Collective ===
In 2016, Radical Grandma Collective (RadGram), an environmental social enterprise based in Na Nong Bong, was formed. Led by American academic and Thammasat University lecturer Rebecca "Becky" Goncharoff, the enterprise sells woven scarves made in Na Nong Bong to customers in the United States, Bangkok, and Hong Kong to support activism against mining.

In 2017, the mine was shut down.
