= Pha Khao district =

Pha Khao ผาขาว
- District
- District location in Loei Province
- Coordinates: 17°4′0″N 102°1′36″E
- Country: Thailand
- Province: Loei
- Seat: Non Po Daeng

Area
  - Total: 463.0 km^{2} (178.8 sq mi)

Population (2005)
  - Total: 40,047
  - Density: 86.5/km^{2} (224/sq mi)
- Time zone: UTC+7 (ICT)
- Postal code: 42240
- Geocode: 4212

Pha Khao (Thai: ผาขาว; IPA: [pʰǎː kʰǎːw]) is a district (amphoe) of Loei Province, in northeastern Thailand.

== Geography ==
Neighboring districts are (from the south clockwise): Phu Kradueng, Nong Hin, Wang Saphung, and Erawan of Loei Province; and Si Bun Rueang of Nong Bua Lamphu Province.

== History ==
The minor district (king amphoe) was established on 1 January 1988, when the four tambons, Pha Khao, Tha Chang Khlong, Non Po Daeng, and Non Pa Sang, were split off from Phu Kradueng. It was upgraded to a full district on 3 November 1993.

== Administration ==
The district is divided into five sub-districts (tambons), which are further subdivided into 64 villages (mubans). There are no municipal (thesaban) areas. There are five tambon administrative organizations (TAO).

No.	Name	Thai name	Villages	Pop.
1.	Pha Khao	ผาขาว	12	6,405
2.	Tha Chang Khlong	ท่าช้างคล้อง	14	10,458
3.	Non Po Daeng	โนนปอแดง	16	10,365
4.	Non Pa Sang	โนนป่าซาง	13	7,445
5.	Ban Phoem	บ้านเพิ่ม	9	5,374
