= Phu Luang district =

Phu Luang ภูหลวง
- District
- District location in Loei province
- Coordinates: 17°8′24″N 101°39′54″E
- Country: Thailand
- Province: Loei
- Seat: Nong Khan

Area
  - Total: 595.0 km^{2} (229.7 sq mi)

Population (2005)
  - Total: 23,069
  - Density: 38.8/km^{2} (100/sq mi)
- Time zone: UTC+7 (ICT)
- Postal code: 42230
- Geocode: 4211

Phu Luang (Thai: ภูหลวง, pronounced [pʰūː lǔa̯ŋ]) is a district (amphoe) of Loei province, in northeastern Thailand.

== Geography ==
Neighboring districts are (from the south clockwise): Nam Nao of Phetchabun province; Phu Ruea, Wang Saphung, Nong Hin, and Phu Kradueng of Loei Province.

To the northwest of the district is the plateau of Phu Luang mountain, which also gave the district its name. It is now protected as the Phu Luang Wildlife Sanctuary. In tambon Kaeng Si Phum is the Namtok Huai Lao Forest Park, covering 3.4 km² around the Huai Lao waterfall.

== History ==
The minor district (king amphoe) was established on 28 November 1980 with the two tambons Phu Ho and Nong Khan split off from Wang Saphung district. It was upgraded to a full district on 9 May 1992.

== Administration ==
The district is divided into five sub-districts (tambons), which are further subdivided into 43 villages (mubans). There are no municipal (thesaban) areas. There are five tambon administrative organizations (TAO).

No.	Name	Thai name	Villages	Pop.
1.	Phu Ho	ภูหอ	10	6,420
2.	Nong Khan	หนองคัน	9	4,601
4.	Huai Sisiat	ห้วยสีเสียด	8	3,966
5.	Loei Wang Sai	เลยวังไสย์	8	4,138
6.	Kaeng Si Phum	แก่งศรีภูมิ	8	3,944

Geocode 3 is not used.
