= Pak Chom district =

Pak Chom ปากชม
- District
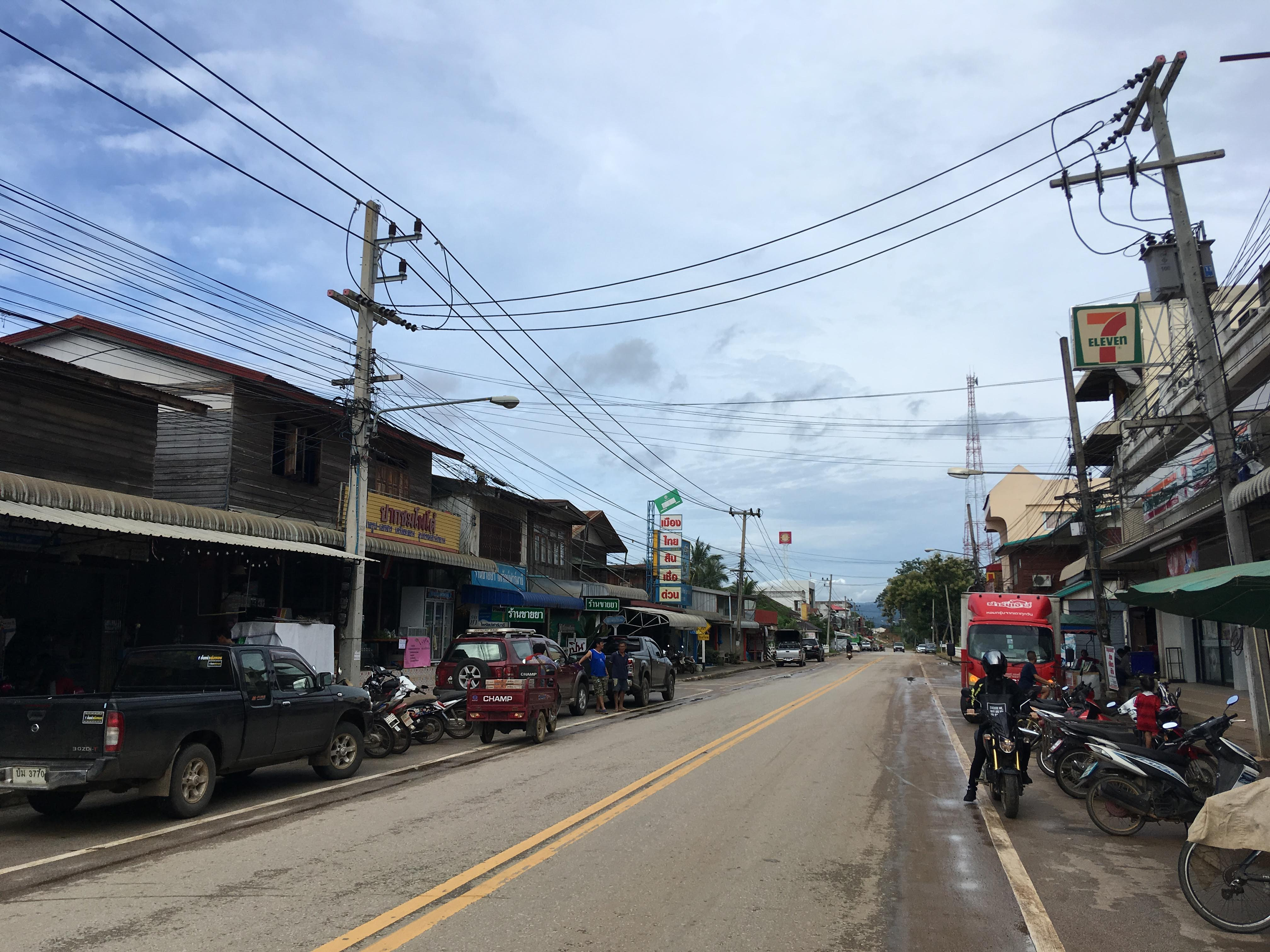
- Street in Pak Chom

- District location in Loei province
- Coordinates: 17°54′N 101°57′E
- Country: Thailand
- Province: Loei
- Seat: Pak Chom

Area
  - Total: 957.0 km^{2} (369.5 sq mi)

Population (2005)
  - Total: 37,934
  - Density: 39.6/km^{2} (103/sq mi)
- Time zone: UTC+7 (ICT)
- Postal code: 42150
- Geocode: 4204

Pak Chom (Thai: ปากชม, pronounced [pàːk t͡ɕʰōm]) is the northeasternmost district (amphoe) of Loei province, in northeastern Thailand.

== History ==
The minor district (king amphoe) Pak Chom was created on 1 September 1967, when the three tambons, Pak Chom, Hat Khamphi, and Chiang Klom, were split off from Chiang Khan district. It was upgraded to a full district in 1971.

== Geography ==
Neighboring districts are (from the east clockwise): Sangkhom of Nong Khai province; Na Yung, Nam Som of Udon Thani province; Na Duang, Mueang Loei, and Chiang Khan of Loei Province. To the north is Vientiane province of Laos.

The important water resources are the Mekong and Chom Rivers. Its name Pak Chom means "the mouth of the Chom River". Pak Chom is the place where the Mekong confluence the Chom Rivers, hence the name.

== Administration ==
The district is divided into six communes (tambons), which are further subdivided into 50 villages (mubans). There are two townships (thesaban tambons). Pak Chom and Chiang Klom each cover parts of the same-named tambons. There are a further six tambon administrative organizations (TAO).

No.	Name	Thai name	Villages	Pop.
1.	Pak Chom	ปากชม	12	8,426
2.	Chiang Klom	เชียงกลม	10	9,683
3.	Hat Khamphi	หาดคัมภีร์	6	3,719
4.	Huai Bo Suen	ห้วยบ่อซืน	6	5,128
5.	Huai Phichai	ห้วยพิชัย	10	6,755
6.	Chom Charoen	ชมเจริญ	6	4,223
