= Tha Li district =

Tha Li ท่าลี่
- District
- District location in Loei province
- Coordinates: 17°37′28″N 101°25′17″E
- Country: Thailand
- Province: Loei
- Seat: Tha Li

Area
  - Total: 683.0 km^{2} (263.7 sq mi)

Population (2005)
  - Total: 27,117
  - Density: 39.7/km^{2} (103/sq mi)
- Time zone: UTC+7 (ICT)
- Postal code: 42140
- Geocode: 4208

Tha Li (Thai: ท่าลี่; IPA: [tʰâː lîː]) is a district (amphoe) in the northwestern part of Loei province, in northeastern Thailand.

== Geography ==
Neighboring districts are (from the northeast clockwise): Chiang Khan, Mueang Loei and Phu Ruea of Loei Province. To the northwest is Xaignabouli province of Laos.

The northwestern part of the district reaches the southern end of the Luang Prabang Range mountain area of the Thai highlands.

== Administration ==
The district is divided into six sub-districts (tambons), which are further subdivided into 41 villages (mubans). Tha Li is a township (thesaban tambon) which covers parts of tambon Tha Li. There are a further five tambon administrative organizations (TAO).

| No. | Name | Thai name | Villages | Pop. |
|---|---|---|---|---|
| 1. | Tha Li | ท่าลี่ | 9 | 5,718 |
| 2. | Nong Phue | หนองผือ | 10 | 7,141 |
| 3. | A Hi | อาฮี | 6 | 4,646 |
| 4. | Nam Khaem | น้ำแคม | 6 | 5,004 |
| 5. | Khok Yai | โคกใหญ่ | 5 | 2,956 |
| 6. | Nam Thun | น้ำทูน | 5 | 1,652 |
