= Chiang Khan district =

Chiang Khan เชียงคาน
- District
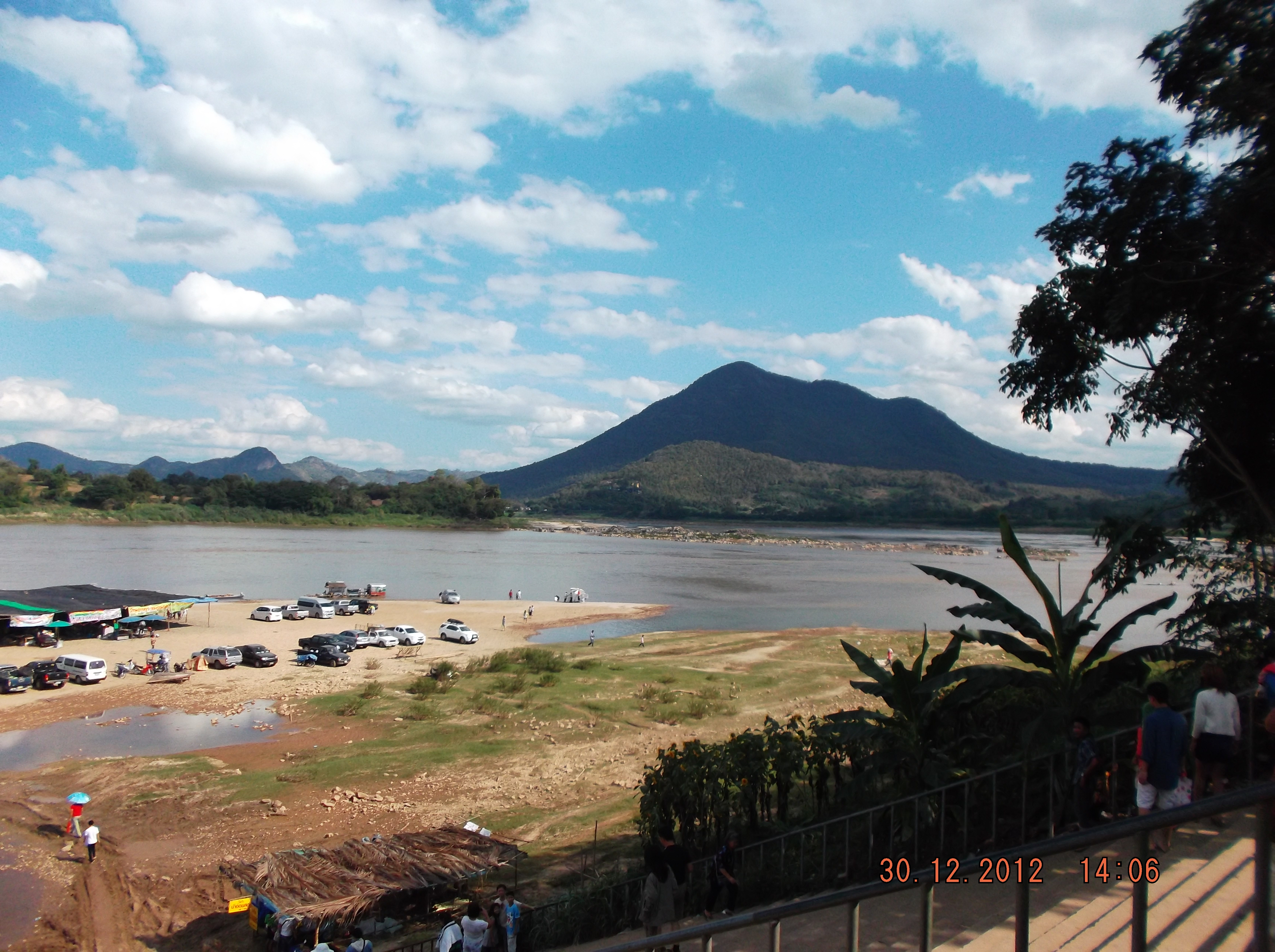
- Kaeng Khut Khu beach on the Mekong River
- Interactive map of Chiang Khan
- Coordinates: 17°53′53″N 101°39′59″E
- Country: Thailand
- Province: Loei
- Seat: Chiang Khan

Area
  - Total: 867.0 km^{2} (334.8 sq mi)

Population (2005)
  - Total: 59,016
  - Density: 68.1/km^{2} (176/sq mi)
- Time zone: UTC+7 (ICT)
- Postal code: 42110
- Geocode: 4203

Chiang Khan (Thai: เชียงคาน, pronounced [t͡ɕʰīa̯ŋ kʰāːn]) is a district (amphoe) in the northern part of Loei province, in northeastern Thailand.

== Geography ==
Neighbouring districts are (from the east clockwise): Pak Chom, Mueang Loei, and Tha Li of Loei Province. To the northwest are the Xaignabouli and Vientiane Provinces of Laos.

The important water resources are the Mekong, Hueang, and Loei Rivers.

== History ==
Chiang Khan was founded in the late-19th century when Lao villagers crossed the Mekong after the French colonised Laos. More migrants later arrived from Vietnam and China. Chiang Khan became a trading hub largely due to its location on the river. People on both sides of the rivers exchanged goods, culture, and language. Trading stopped in 1975 when the communist Pathet Lao seized power from the Lao government and cut economic ties to Thailand. Chiang Khan languished until rediscovered in the early-21st century.

== Administration ==
The district is divided into eight sub-districts (tambons), which are further subdivided into 78 villages (mubans). There are two townships (thesaban tambons), Chiang Khan and Khao Kaeo, each covering parts of tambons of the same names. There are a further seven tambon administrative organizations (TAO).

No.	Name	Thai name	Villages	Pop.
1.	Chiang Khan	เชียงคาน	6	10,245
2.	That	ธาตุ	15	9,523
3.	Na Sao	นาซ่าว	15	11,453
4.	Khao Kaeo	เขาแก้ว	13	7,596
5.	Pak Tom	ปากตม	7	5,967
6.	Bu Hom	บุฮม	10	7,528
7.	Chom Si	จอมศรี	7	4,301
8.	Hat Sai Khao	หาดทรายขาว	5	2,403

== Economy ==
Fishing the Mekong River was formerly Chiang Khan's biggest earner. Some 650,000 persons, Thai and foreign, visit the village every year.

== Popular culture ==
Chiang Khan was used as the main setting for the 2014 romantic comedy Chiang Khan Love Story (Tookae Ruk Pang Mak), directed by Yuthlert Sippapak. It was the seventh highest-grossing film in Thailand in 2014.

Chiang Khan was referenced in 2018–19 TV drama's Channel 7 HD Nai Keun Nao Sang Dao Yung Oun as a backdrop for the story.
