= Loei River =

River in Thailand

- Map showing the Loei River
- Native name: แม่น้ำเลย (Thai)

Location
- Country: Thailand
- State: Loei province,
- Region: Loei Province
- City: ?

Physical characteristics
- Source
  - location: western shore of the Phu Luang plateau
  - coordinates: 17°51′39″N 101°36′31″E
- Mouth: Mekong River
  - location: Mekong River, Na Sao Subdistrict, Chiang Khan District, Loei province
  - coordinates: 17°9′0″N 101°9′0″E
  - elevation: 128 m (420 ft)
- Length: 231 km (144 mi)
- Basin size: ?
- Discharge
  - location: Chiang Khan District
  - average: ?
  - minimum: ?
  - maximum: ?

The Loei River (Thai: แม่น้ำเลย, RTGS: Maenam Loei, pronounced [mɛ̂ː.náːm lɤ̄ːj]) is located in Northeastern Thailand. It's a tributary of the Mekong.

== Geography ==
The Loei River is part of the Northeast Khong Basin and flows through Loei Province with a total length of approximately 231 km (144 mi).

Its source is in northeastern Thailand, on the western edge of the 848 km² Phu Luang plateau, within the districts (amphoe) of Wang Saphung, Phu Ruea, Dan Sai, and Phu Luang. From there, the Loei initially flows south. Eventually, its course changes to the east, forming the natural border between the provinces of Loei and Phetchabun. After flowing around Mount Phu Ho, it turns north and reaches the provincial capital of Loei. From here, the river continues 47 kilometers north to Na Sao Subdistrict of Chiang Khan, where it joins the Mekong.
