= Tongkah Harbour =

Company of Thailand

Tongkah Harbour Public Company Limited is a mining company and property developer in Thailand. The company was listed on the Stock Exchange of Thailand (SET:THL) in 1993.

The company was founded in 1906 by Edward T. Miles as the "Tongkah Harbour Tin Dredging Company N.L." It began offshore tin mining in Phuket Bay in 1907.

In 1991 the company's subsidiary, Tungkum Limited (TKL), was founded and granted a concession in the Wang Saphung District of Loei Province for the exploration and mining of gold and related minerals. Tungkum has been the target of demonstrations by residents living in the vicinity of the gold mine. They accuse the company of environmental destruction.

== Tungkum accused of judicial harassment ==
The Khon Rak Ban Kerd Group (KRBKG) is a community-based group committed to defending the local environment from the negative impacts of the open-pit copper-gold mine operated by the Tungkum Company in Loei Province. On 30 March 2016, the Loei Provincial Court dismissed a civil defamation lawsuit brought by six KRBKG members who live in communities near the open-pit copper-gold mine, for erecting signs in 2015 at the Na Nong Bong village entrance gate and along the main road in the village, calling for the closure of the controversial mine and rehabilitation of the local environment. Tungkum sought 50 million baht in compensation from the six KRBKG members for alleged damage to the company’s reputation. Tungkum has brought at least 19 criminal and civil lawsuits against 33 members of the KRBKG and other villagers in the past seven years, including the case dismissed yesterday. Using lawsuits, the company has sought a total of 320 million baht from villagers who oppose the mine. Following a three-year investigation, the NGO Fortify Rights found that the company and the Thai government had "...targeted environmental defenders...journalists, and others with costly lawsuits that infringe on basic rights." Their findings are documented in a 90-page report issued in October 2018.
