= Wang Saphung district =

Wang Saphung วังสะพุง
- District
- District location in Loei province
- Coordinates: 17°18′6″N 101°46′6″E
- Country: Thailand
- Province: Loei

Area
  - Total: 1,145.0 km^{2} (442.1 sq mi)

Population (2008)
  - Total: 109,424
  - Density: 94.6/km^{2} (245/sq mi)
- Time zone: UTC+7 (ICT)
- Postal code: 42130
- Geocode: 4209

Wang Saphung (Thai: วังสะพุง; IPA: [wāŋ sā.pʰūŋ]) is a district (amphoe) in the central part of Loei province, in northeastern Thailand. The district has been the site of a long-standing dispute between the villagers of Ban Na Nong Bong and its environs and Tungkum Limited, a subsidiary of Tongkah Harbour PCL. Tungkum extracts gold from an open pit mine in district and has been charged with environmental destruction by many of those living nearby.

== History ==
Khwaeng Wang Saphung was a satellite city of Mueang Lom Sak. It was assigned to be under Mueang Loei on 4 January 1907.

== Geography ==
Neighboring districts are (from the north clockwise): Mueang Loei district, Erawan, Pha Khao, Nong Hin, Phu Luang, and Phu Ruea of Loei Province.

The important water resource is the Loei River. The Phu Luang Wildlife Sanctuary is in the west of the district.

== Administration ==
The district is divided into 10 sub-districts (tambons), which are further subdivided into 141 villages (mubans). Wang Saphung is a sub-district municipality (thesaban tambon) which covers parts of tambons Wang Saphung and Si Songkhram. There are a further 10 tambon administrative organizations (TAO).

| No. | Name | Thai | Villages | Pop. |
|---|---|---|---|---|
| 1. | Wang Saphung | วังสะพุง | 13 | 15,821 |
| 2. | Sai Khao | ทรายขาว | 20 | 13,877 |
| 3. | Nong Ya Plong | หนองหญ้าปล้อง | 20 | 16,006 |
| 4. | Nong Ngio | หนองงิ้ว | 9 | 5,067 |
| 5. | Pak Puan | ปากปวน | 11 | 7,784 |
| 6. | Pha Noi | ผาน้อย | 19 | 13,010 |
| 10. | Pha Bing | ผาบิ้ง | 6 | 4,564 |
| 11. | Khao Luang | เขาหลวง | 13 | 9,672 |
| 12. | Khok Khamin | โคกขมิ้น | 20 | 14,505 |
| 13. | Si Songkhram | ศรีสงคราม | 10 | 9,118 |

Missing numbers are tambons which now form Erawan district.

== Economy ==
Wang Saphung is known to have the largest number of small scale lottery vendors in Thailand. Many of residents have their part-time jobs as lottery sellers, especially during times of economic trouble.

== Conflict with mining interests ==
The Khon Rak Ban Kerd Group (KRBKG) is a community-based group committed to defend the local environment from the negative impacts of the open-pit copper-gold mine operated by the Tungkum Company in the district. On 30 March 2016, the Loei Provincial Court dismissed a civil defamation lawsuit brought by six KRBKG members who live in communities near the open-pit copper-gold mine, for erecting signs in 2015 at the Na Nong Bong village entrance gate and along the main road in the village, calling for the closure of the controversial mine and rehabilitation of the local environment. Tungkum sought 50 million baht in compensation from the six KRBKG members for alleged damage to the company's reputation. Tungkum has brought at least 19 criminal and civil lawsuits against 33 members of the KRBKG and other villagers in the past seven years, including the case dismissed yesterday. Using lawsuits, the company has sought a total of 320 million baht from villagers who oppose the mine. Following a three-year investigation, the NGO Fortify Rights found that the company and the Thai government had "...targeted environmental defenders...journalists, and others with costly lawsuits that infringe on basic rights." Their findings are documented in a 90-page report issued in October 2018.
