= Phu Kradueng =

- ภูกระดึง
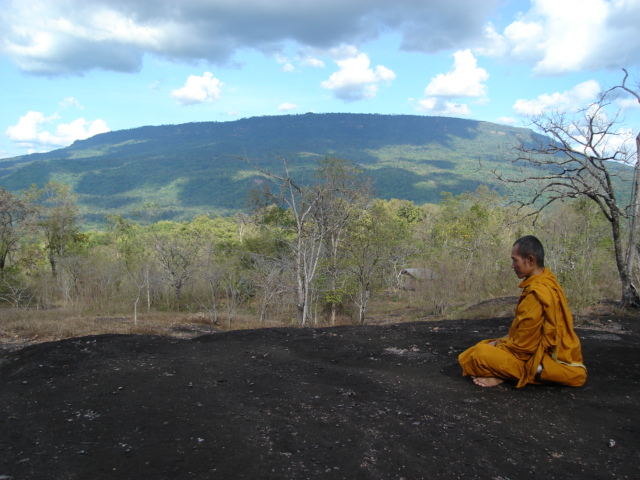
- West side of the mountain seen from Nam Nao area

Highest point
- Elevation: 1,316 m (4,318 ft)
- Listing: List of mountains in Thailand
- Coordinates: 16°53′23″N 101°44′43″E

Geography
- Location within Thailand
- Location: Loei, Thailand
- Parent range: Phetchabun Mountains

Geology
- Mountain type: sandstone

Phu Kradueng (Thai: ภูกระดึง), is a 1,316 m (4,318 ft) high mountain in Loei Province, Thailand. It is in Phu Kradueng District, giving its name to the district. Its west side borders Nam Nao District of Phetchabun Province. This mountain is part of the Phetchabun Mountains, a massif forming a natural boundary between North Thailand and Isan.

Phu Kradueng rises nine kilometres west of Highway 201.

== Description ==
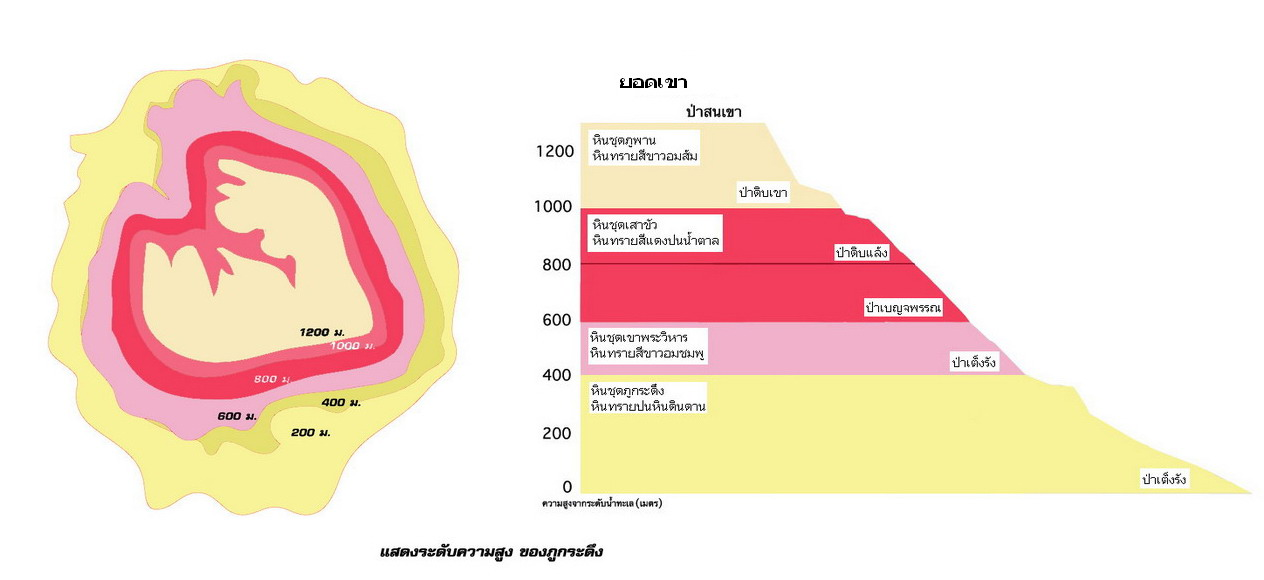
Altitudes of Phu Kradueng; ground plan and cross section

The name of the mountain comes stems from its silhouette looks like a large bell (Thai: กระดึง; kradueng). There is also a local legend that a mysterious bell sound, believed to be the bell of Indra, can be heard in the area of the mountain.

Phu Kradueng seen from above is heart-shaped. It has a relatively flat plain on its top, sloping slightly to the north. The summit, in the southwestern part of the plateau, is inconspicuous. The western, southern, and eastern edges of the mountain have a fairly regular shape and are formed by abrupt sandstone cliffs, while the northwestern corner is deeply indented, containing a number of streams and seasonal waterfalls.

Geologically, Phu Kradueng is formed by Jurassic and Cretaceous sandstone. Large parts of the mountain are covered in mixed evergreen forest. At the base of the mountain deciduous Dipterocarp forest dominates. Dry evergreen forest follow hill evergreen forests with bamboo clumps at higher altitudes. There are wide stretches of grasslands mixed with pine trees at the top.

== Protected area ==
Phu Kradueng National Park is in the area around the mountain. Average daily temperature is 20 °C in the daytime. Between December and January, the nightly temperature can sink to 0 °C. The mountaintop is covered in mist both during the rainy season as well as during the cooler months. The park is closed to visitors during the rainy season (1 June - 30 September).

== See also ==
- List of mountains in Thailand
- Phu Kradueng National Park
- Loei Province
