= Loei province =

Loei เลย
- Province
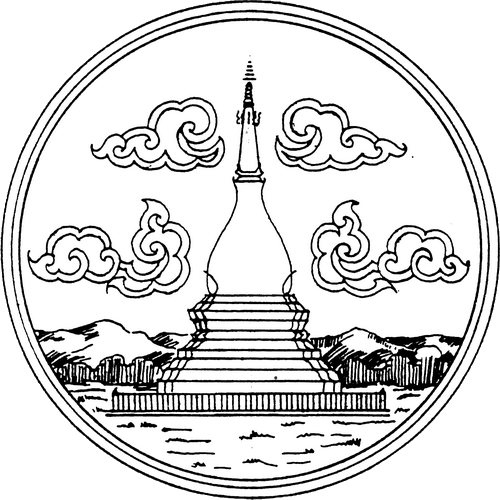
- Flag Seal
- Nickname: ตำรวจภาคส่วน สำนักงานตำรวจแห่งชาติ
- Motto: City of the sea of mountains, coldest place in Siam, with beautiful flowers of three seasons
- Map of Thailand highlighting Loei province
- Coordinates: 17°29′12″N 101°43′10″E
- Country: Thailand
- Capital: Loei

Government
  - Type: Province and Provincial Administrative Organization
  - Body: Loei Province and Loei Provincial Administrative Organization
  - Governor: Chaipote Jaroonpong
  - PAO Chief Executive: Chaithawat Niamsiri

Area
  - Total: 10,500 km^{2} (4,100 sq mi)
  - Rank: 16th

Population (2024)
  - Total: ▼632,187
  - Rank: 42nd
  - Density: 60/km^{2} (160/sq mi)
  - Rank: 68th

Human Achievement Index
  - HAI (2022): 0.6407 "average" Ranked 39th

GDP
  - Total: baht 53 billion (US$1.8 billion) (2019)
- Time zone: UTC+7 (ICT)
- Postal code: 42xxx
- Calling code: 042
- ISO 3166 code: TH-42
- Vehicle registration: เลย
- Website: loei.go.th

Loei (Thai: เลย, pronounced [lɤ̄ːj]), is one of the more sparsely populated provinces (changwat) of Thailand. It lies in the Isan region of upper northeastern Thailand. Neighboring provinces are (from east clockwise) Nong Khai, Udon Thani, Nong Bua Lamphu, Khon Kaen, Phetchabun, and Phitsanulok. In the north it borders Xaignabouli and Vientiane province of Laos.

As of 2020, the provincial governor is Chaiwat Chuenkosum. The province was allocated 225.6 million baht in the FY2019 Thailand budget.

== History ==
At Wang Saphung, Dvaravati-period sema stones, the Buddhist boundary markers of the Khorat Plateau, have been set up as the city pillar (lak mueang). Stephen Murphy gives this and a second case at Kalasin as uses that have nothing to do with the monastic boundaries the stones were cut to mark.

Loei was founded by a Thai tribe from the Kingdom of Yonok Chiang Saen. Khun Pha Muang founded the village of Dan-kwa, and Bang Klang Hao founded Dan Sai. Drought and disease later led to the villagers move to the site of present-day Loei.

In 1907, King Chulalongkorn (Rama V) created Loei province. The Loei Cultural Centre (ศูนย์วัฒนธรรมจังหวัดเลย) displays Loei's history, religions, and traditions. The province is home to many Lao people who fled the Communist take-over of the Kingdom of Laos. The area of the province along the Lao border is used by the Laotians to buy and sell goods with the locals on the Thai side.

== Geography ==
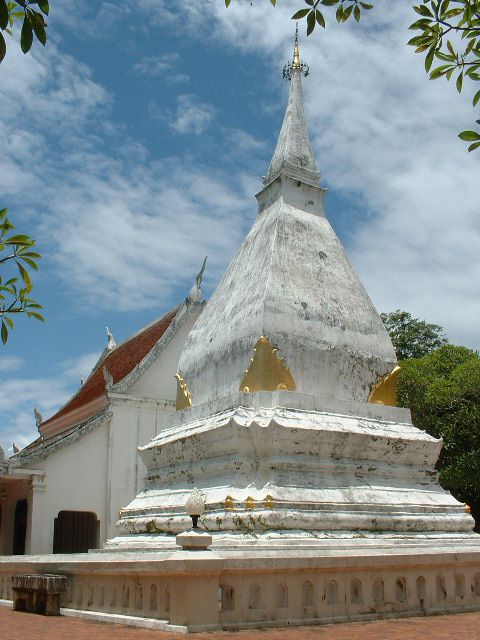
Phra That Si Song Rak, Dan Sai district

The province is mountainous. The seat of provincial government, Loei, is in a fertile basin surrounded by mountains whose summits are covered by fog and abundant varied flora. The best known mountains in the province are Phu Kradueng, Phu Luang, and Phu Ruea. The Loei River, which flows through the province, is a tributary of the Mekong, which forms part of the northern boundary of the province with neighboring Laos. Phu Thap Buek, the highest mountain of the Phetchabun Range, is in the province. The mountain Phu Kradueng is in Phu Kradueng National Park (อุทยานแห่งชาติภูกระดึง). The western part of the province reaches the southern end of the Luang Prabang Range of the Thai highlands. The total forested area is 3,382 km^{2} (1,306 sq mi) or 32.2 percent of the province.

=== National parks ===
There are four national parks, along with two other national parks, make up region 8 (Khon Kaen), and Na Yung–Nam Som in region 10 (Udon Thani) and Phu Hin Rong Kla region 11 (Phitsanulok) of Thailand's protected areas.(Visitors in fiscal year 2024)

Na Yung–Nam Som National Park	397 km^{2} (153 sq mi)	(9,520)
Phu Pha Man National Park	350 km^{2} (140 sq mi)	(37,404)
Phu Kradueng National Park	348 km^{2} (134 sq mi)	(66,941)
Phu Hin Rong Kla National Park	307 km^{2} (119 sq mi)	(223,790)
Phu Ruea National Park	121 km^{2} (47 sq mi)	(78,909)
Phu Suan Sai National Park	117 km^{2} (45 sq mi)	(13,942)

=== Wildlife sanctuaries ===
There are three wildlife sanctuaries, two of which are in region 8 (Khon Kaen), and Phu Khat in region 11 (Phitsanulok) of Thailand's protected areas.

Phu Luang Wildlife Sanctuary	897 km^{2} (346 sq mi)
Phu Khat Wildlife Sanctuary	241 km^{2} (93 sq mi)
Phu Kho–Phu Kratae Wildlife Sanctuary	232 km^{2} (90 sq mi)

Location protected areas of Loei

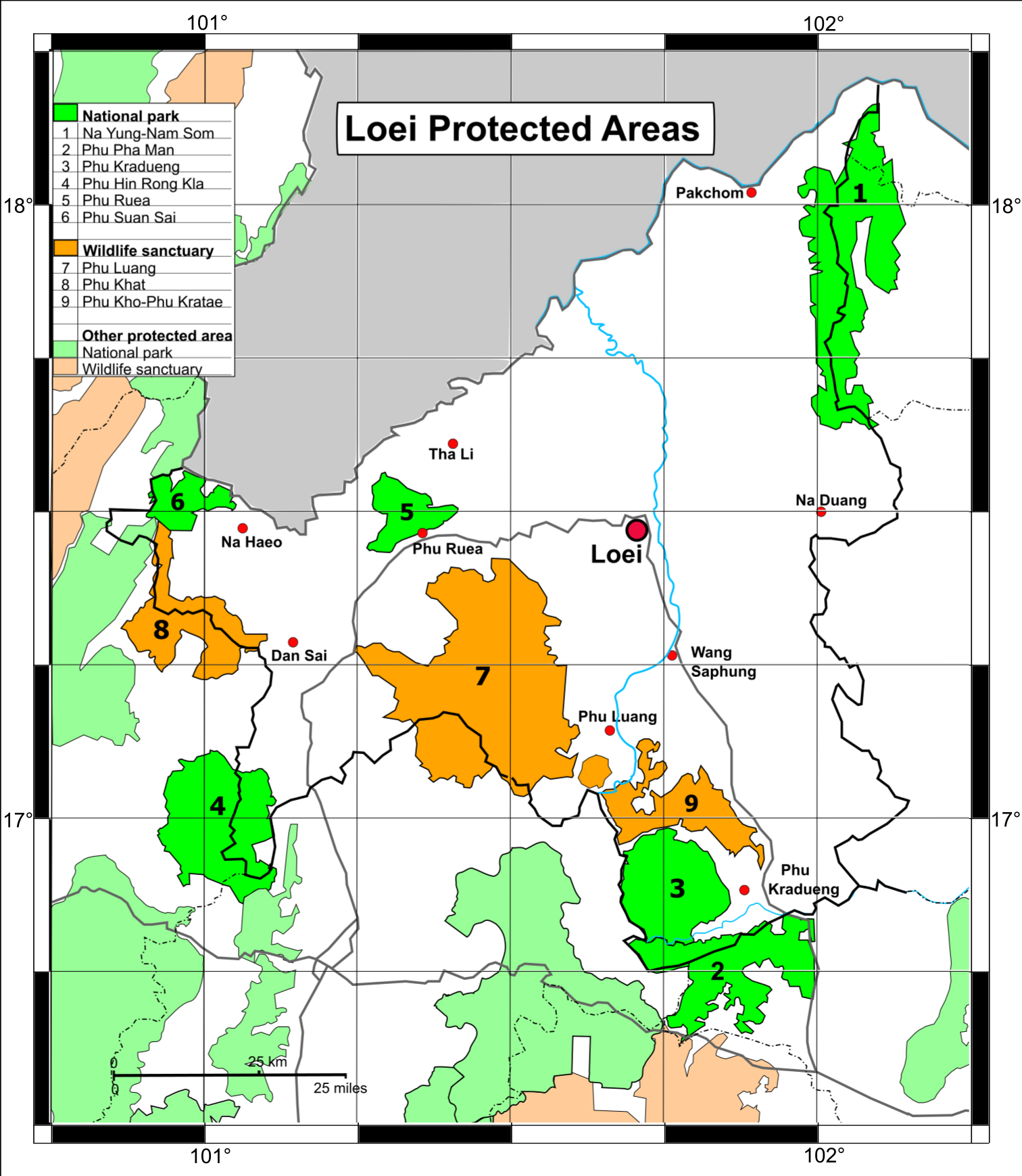
Loei protected areas

	National park
1	Na Yung-Nam Som
2	Phu Pha Man
3	Phu Kradueng
4	Phu Hin Rong Kla
5	Phu Ruea
6	Phu Suan Sai

	Wildlife sanctuary
7	Phu Luang
8	Phu Khat
9	Phu Kho-Phu Kratae

== Demographics ==
Loei province is home to several Tai peoples. The indigenous people are the Tai Lue, while the Phuan, Tai Dam, Thai, and Chinese people make up the rest of the population. The Tai Phuan people came to the province after migrating from Luang Prabang in Laos.

== Symbols ==
The seal of the province shows the stupa at Phra That Si Song Rak, which was built in 1560 by King Maha Chakrapat of the Ayutthaya Kingdom and King Saysettha of Lan Xang as a symbol of friendship between the two kingdoms. The provincial tree is the Khasi pine (Pinus kesiya). Altigena lippa the cyprinid fish is the provincial aquatic life.

The provincial slogan is "city of the sea of mountains, coldest place in Siam, with beautiful flowers of three seasons."

== Economy ==
Agriculture drives Loei's economy. Macadamia nuts, passion fruit, and Arabica coffee are grown in the highlands; bananas, sesame, and rubber on the plains. Loei is an ecotourism destination due to its natural environment and amalgam of northern and northeastern cultures.

Wang Saphung District is the site of a large open pit gold mine that employs many locals. The locality has been the site of a long-standing dispute as well as physical conflict between the villagers of Ban Na Nong Bong and its environs and Tungkum Limited, a subsidiary of Tongkah Harbour PCL. Tungkum's gold mining operation has been accused in the courts of environmental destruction.

== Administrative divisions ==
Map of 14 districts

=== Provincial government ===
The province is divided into 14 districts (amphoe). The districts are further divided into 89 subdistricts (tambons) and 839 villages (mubans).

1. Mueang Loei
2. Na Duang
3. Chiang Khan
4. Pak Chom
5. Dan Sai
6. Na Haeo
7. Phu Ruea
8. Tha Li
9. Wang Saphung
10. Phu Kradueng
11. Phu Luang
12. Pha Khao
13. Erawan
14. Nong Hin

=== Local government ===
As of 26 November 2019 there are: one Loei Provincial Administration Organisation (ongkan borihan suan changwat) and 29 municipal (thesaban) areas in the province. Loei with Wang Saphung have town (thesaban mueang) status. There are a further 27 subdistrict municipalities (thesaban tambon). The non-municipal areas are administered by 71 Subdistrict Administrative Organisations, SAO (ongkan borihan suan tambon).

== Transport ==
Route 201 leads from Chiang Khan in the north on the border with Laos, through Loei, to Non Sa-at near Chum Phae. Route 203 leads west to the vicinity of Phu Ruea, and then turns south to Lom Sak.

Loei is served by Loei Airport.

== Human achievement index 2022 ==
Health	Education	Employment	Income
72	54	30	5
Housing	Family	Transport	Participation
26	32	55	37
Loei province, with a 2022 HAI value of 0.6407, is "average", occupies place 39 in the ranking.

Since 2003, United Nations Development Programme (UNDP) in Thailand has tracked progress on human development at the provincial level using the Human achievement index (HAI), a composite index measuring eight key areas of human development. The National Economic and Social Development Board (NESDB) has taken over this task since 2017.

Rank	Classification
1 – 13	"high"
14 – 29	"somewhat high"
30 – 45	"average"
46 – 61	"somewhat low"
62 – 77	"low"

Map with provinces and HAI 2022 rankings

== Gallery ==
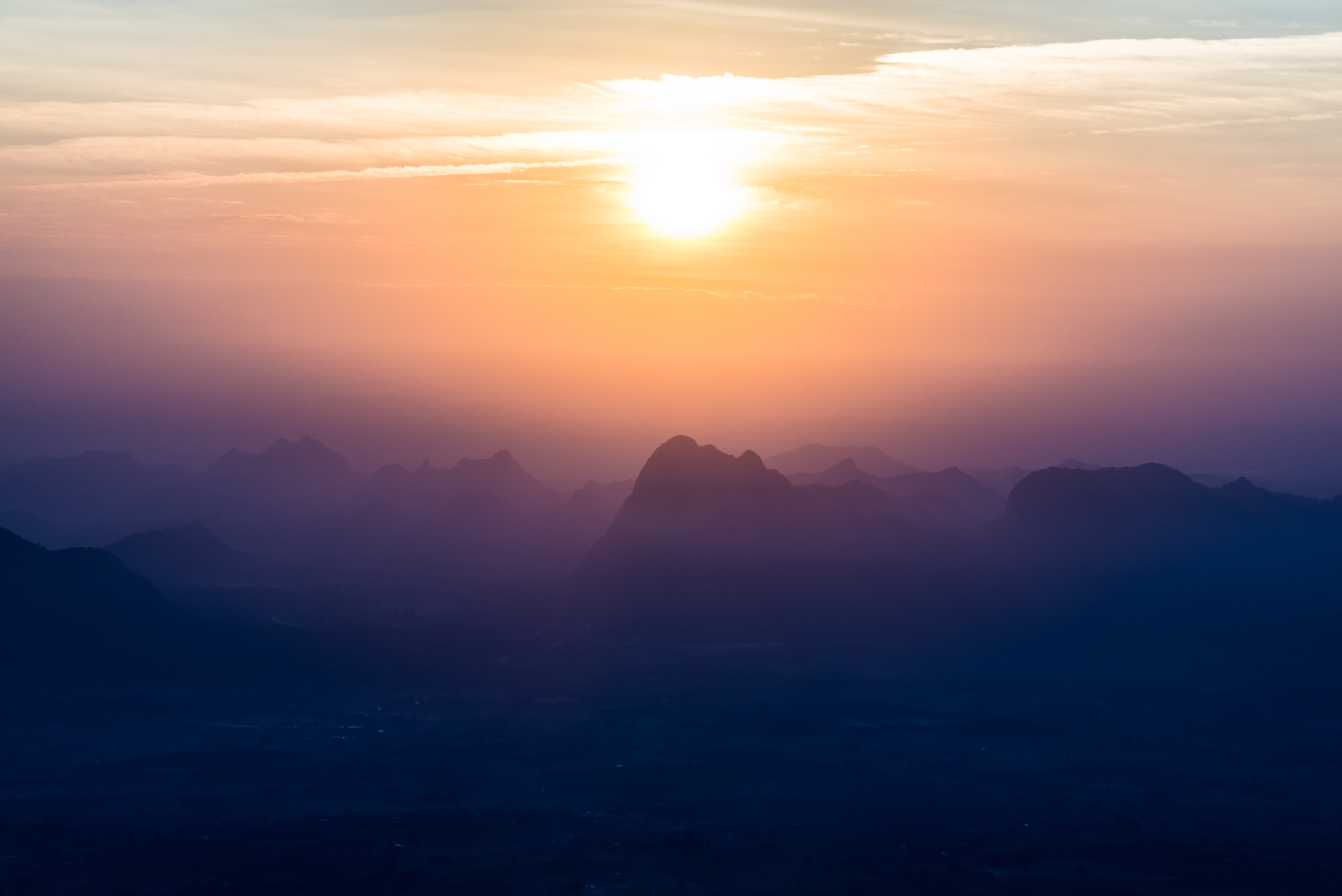
Sunrise, Pha Nok Aen

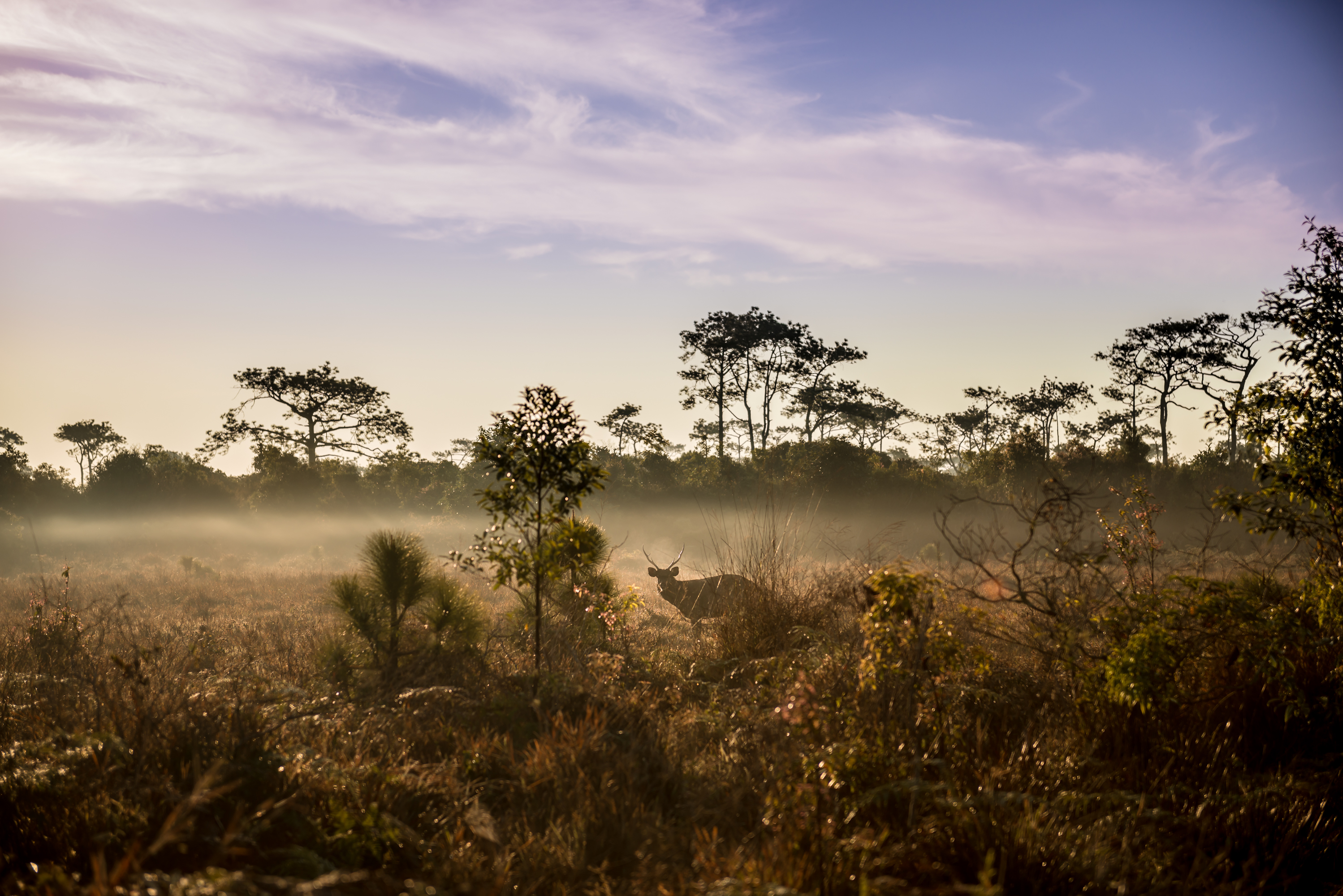
Phu Kradueng National Park

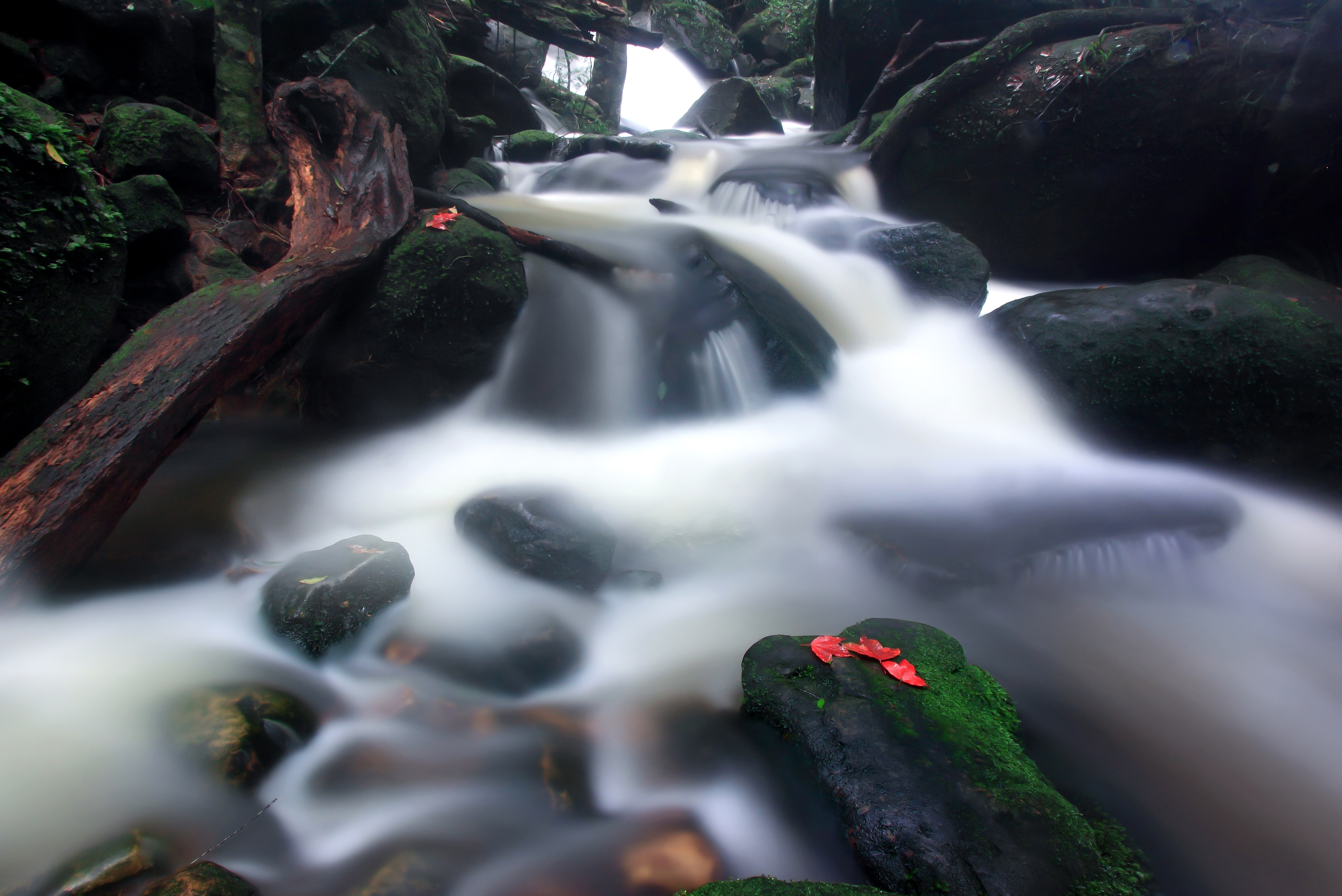
Phu Kradueng National Park

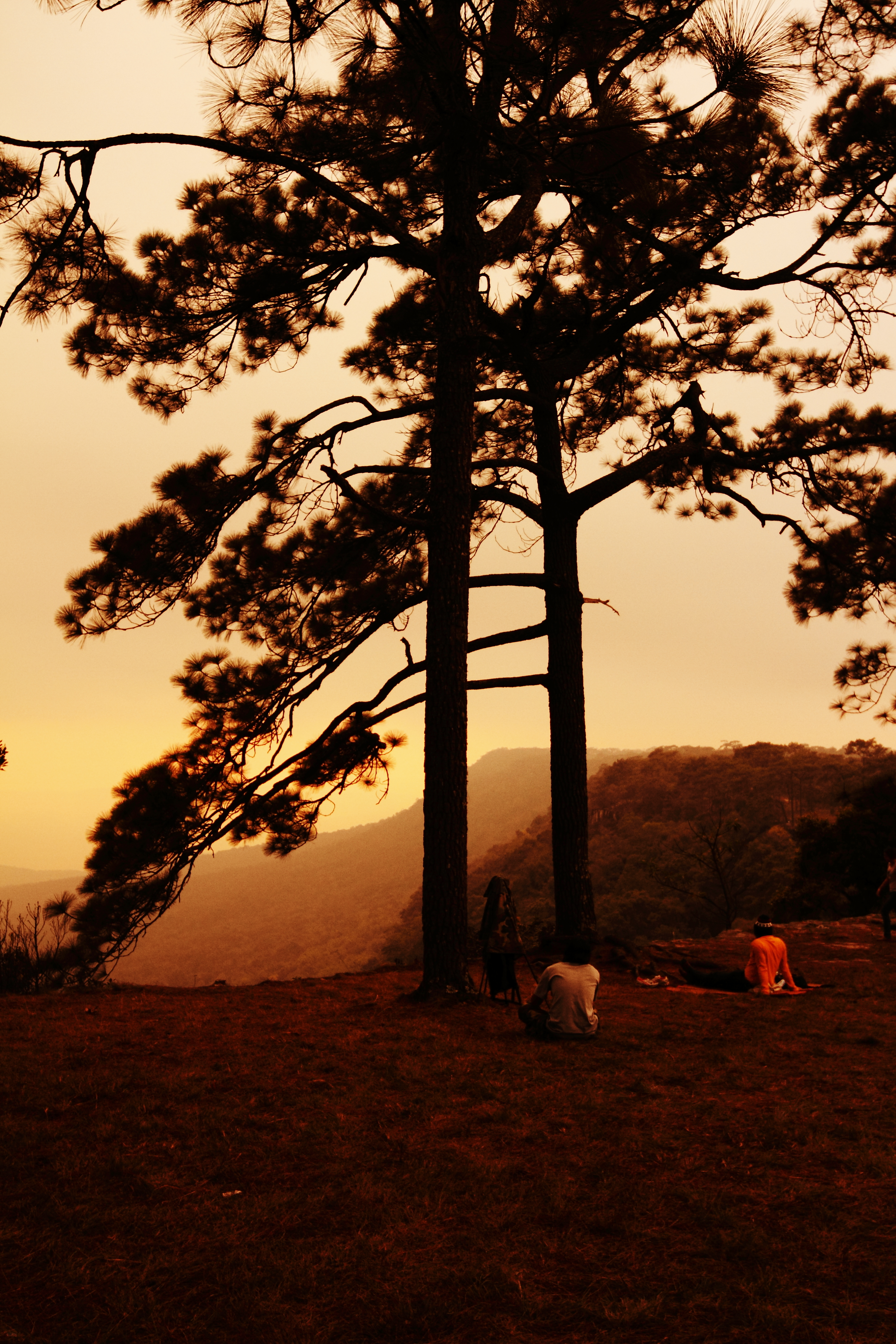
Phu Kradueng

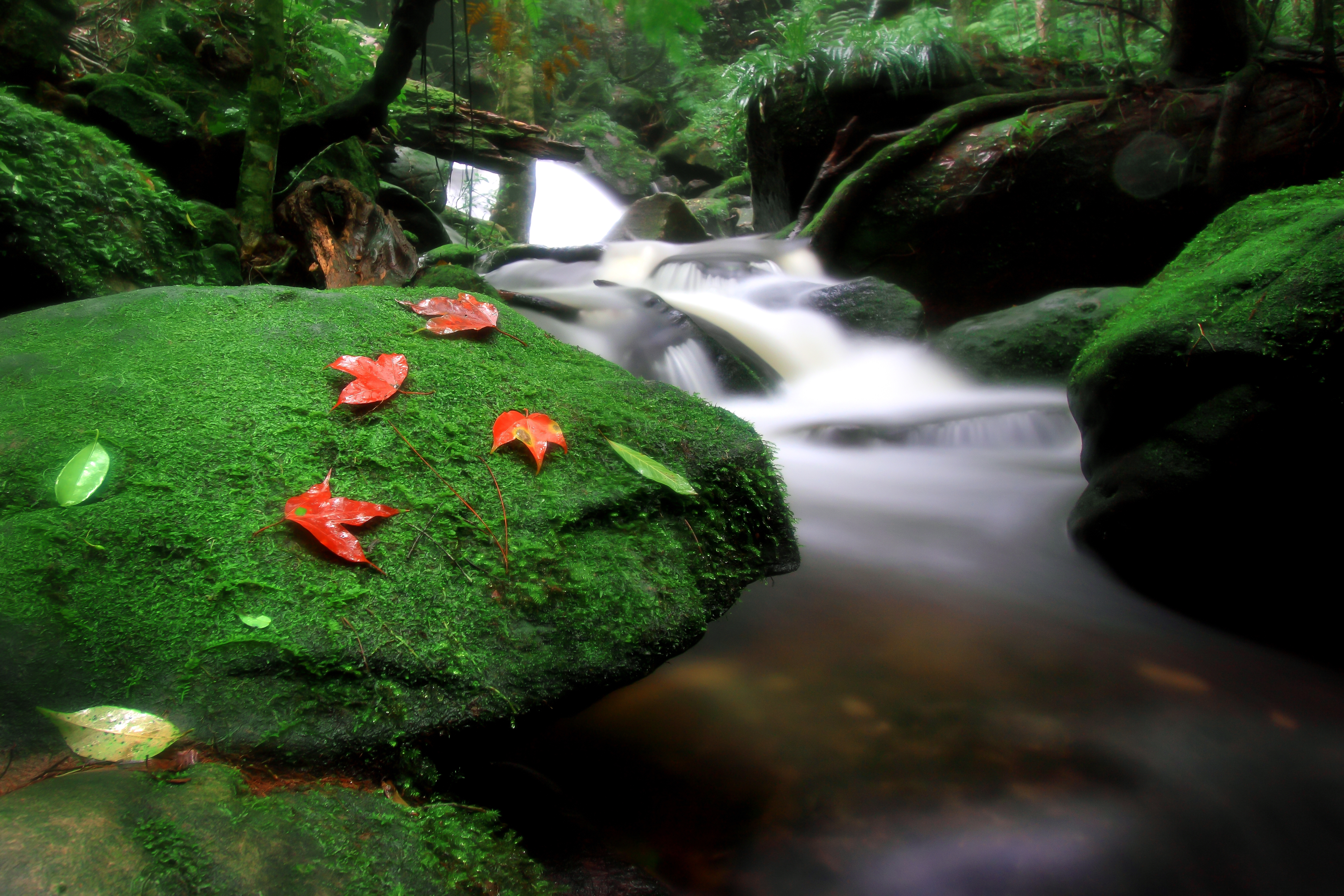
Phu Kradueng

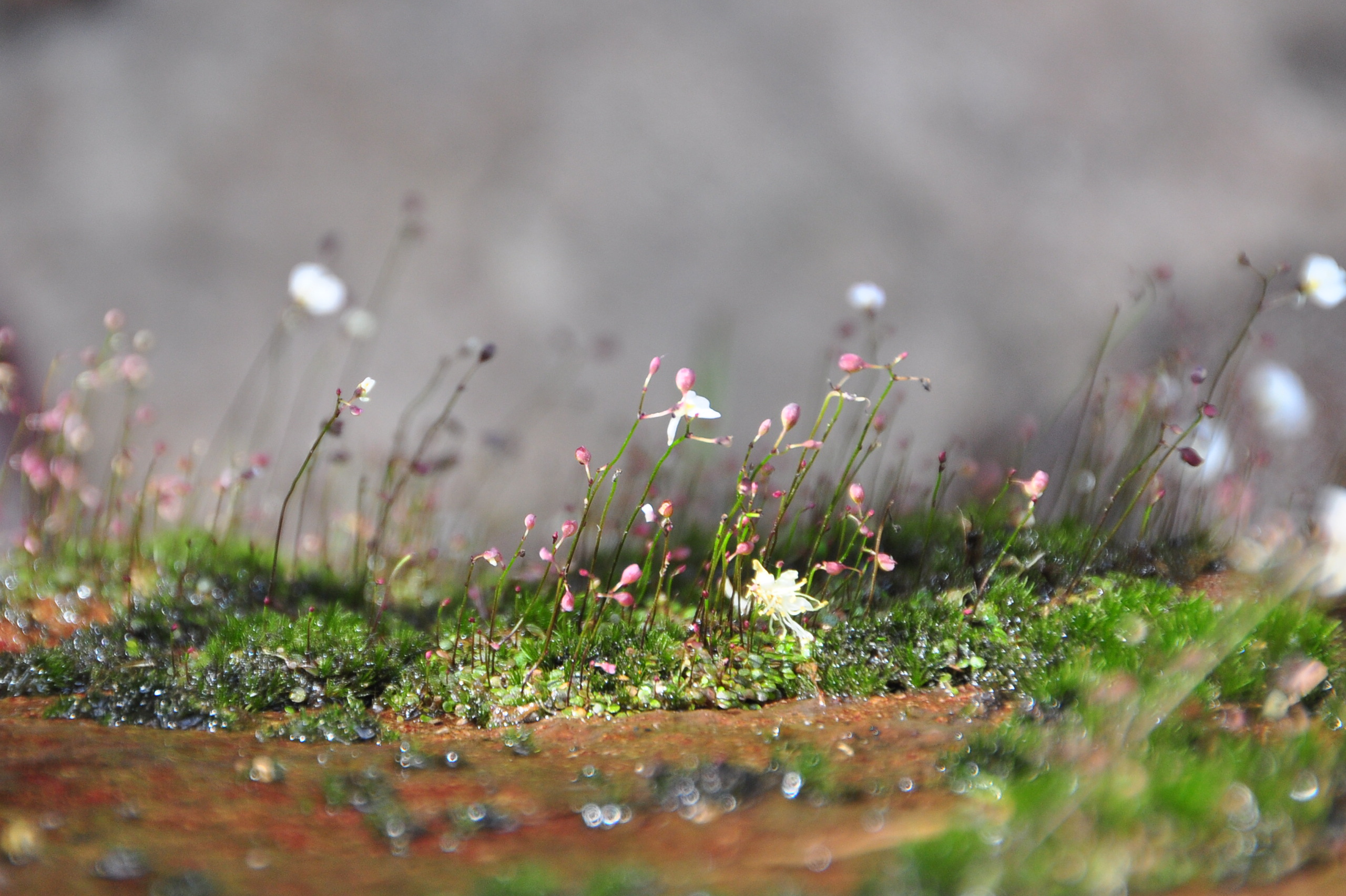
Phu Kradueng

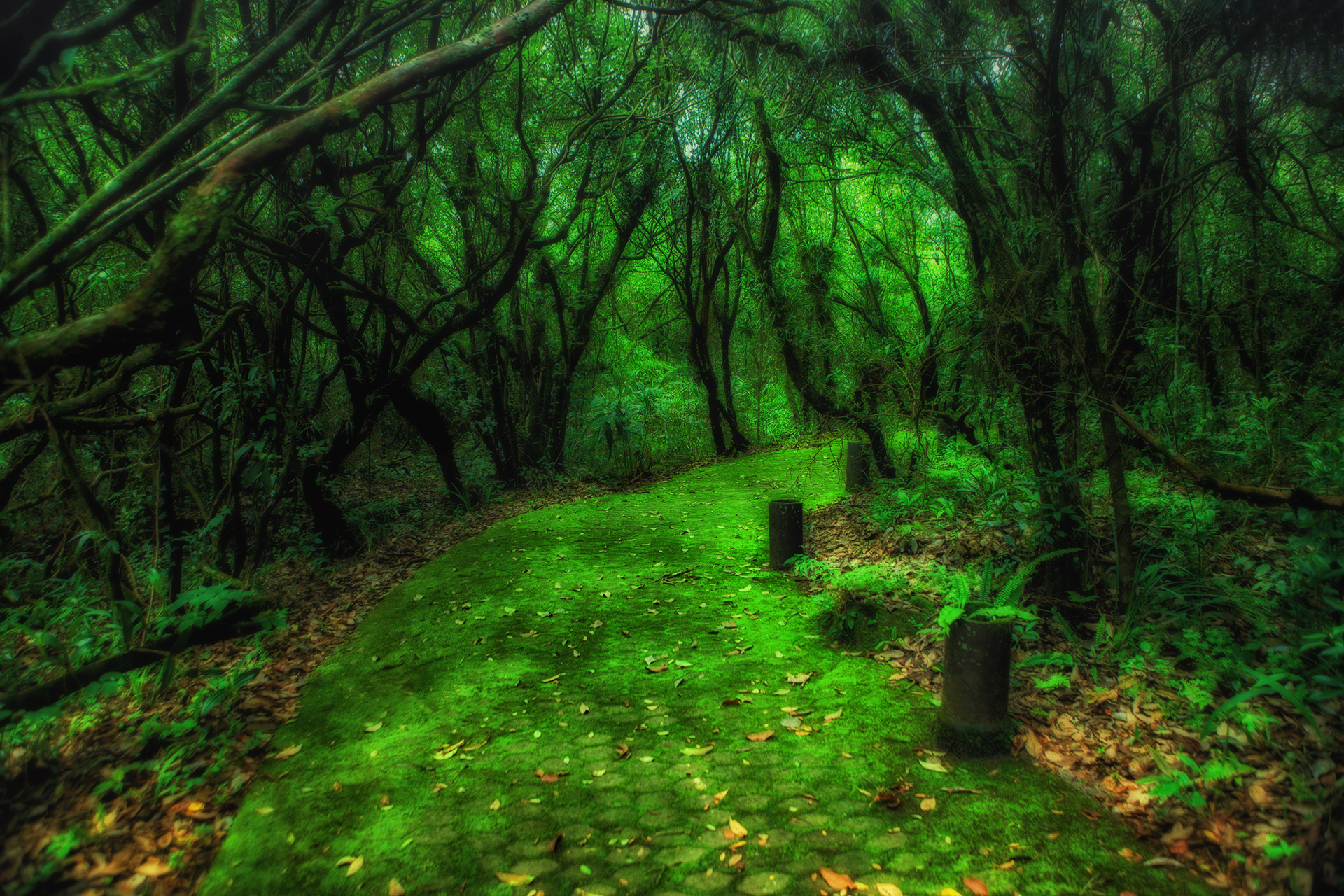
Phu Ruea National Park

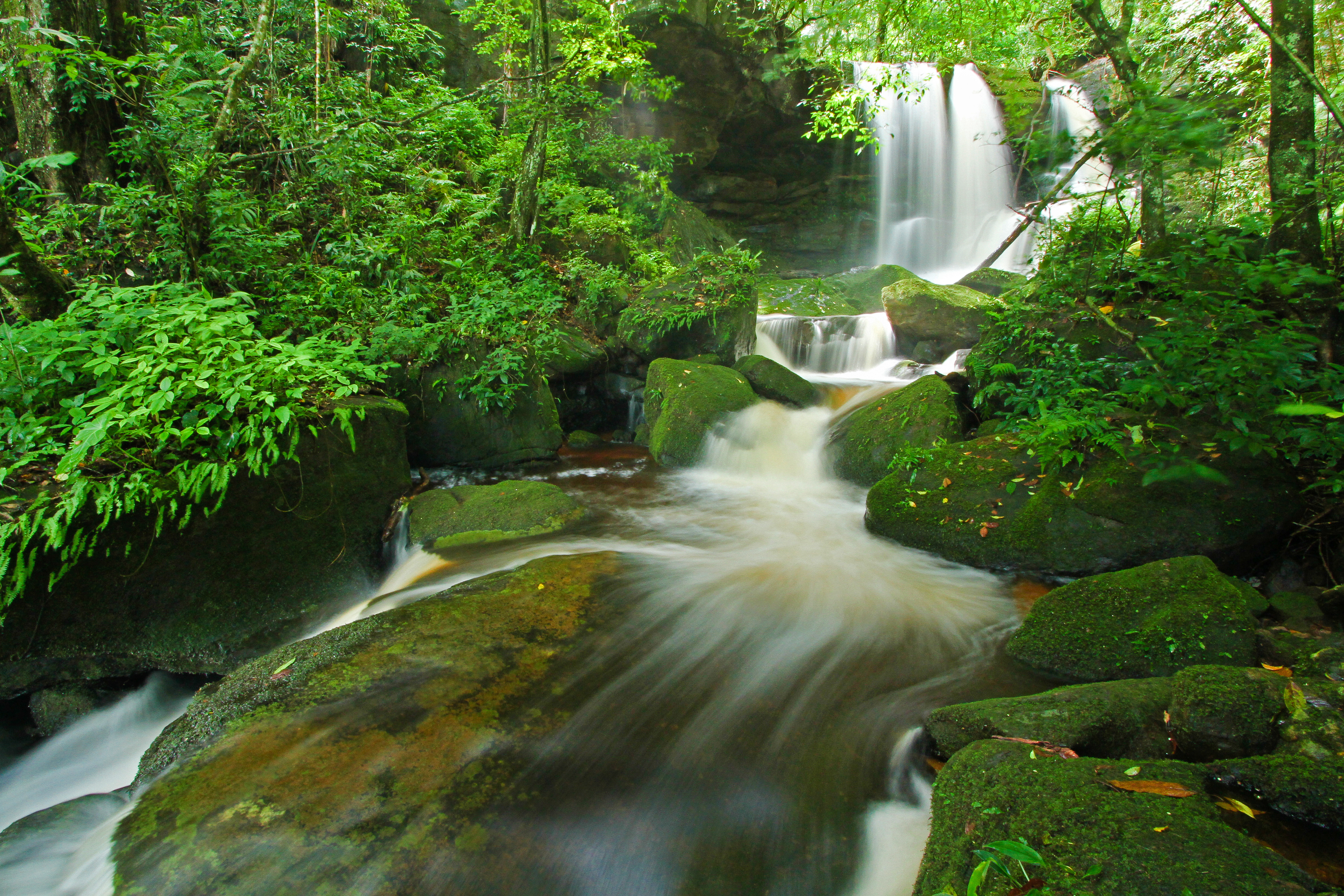
Man Daeng Waterfall, Phu Hin Rong Kla National Park

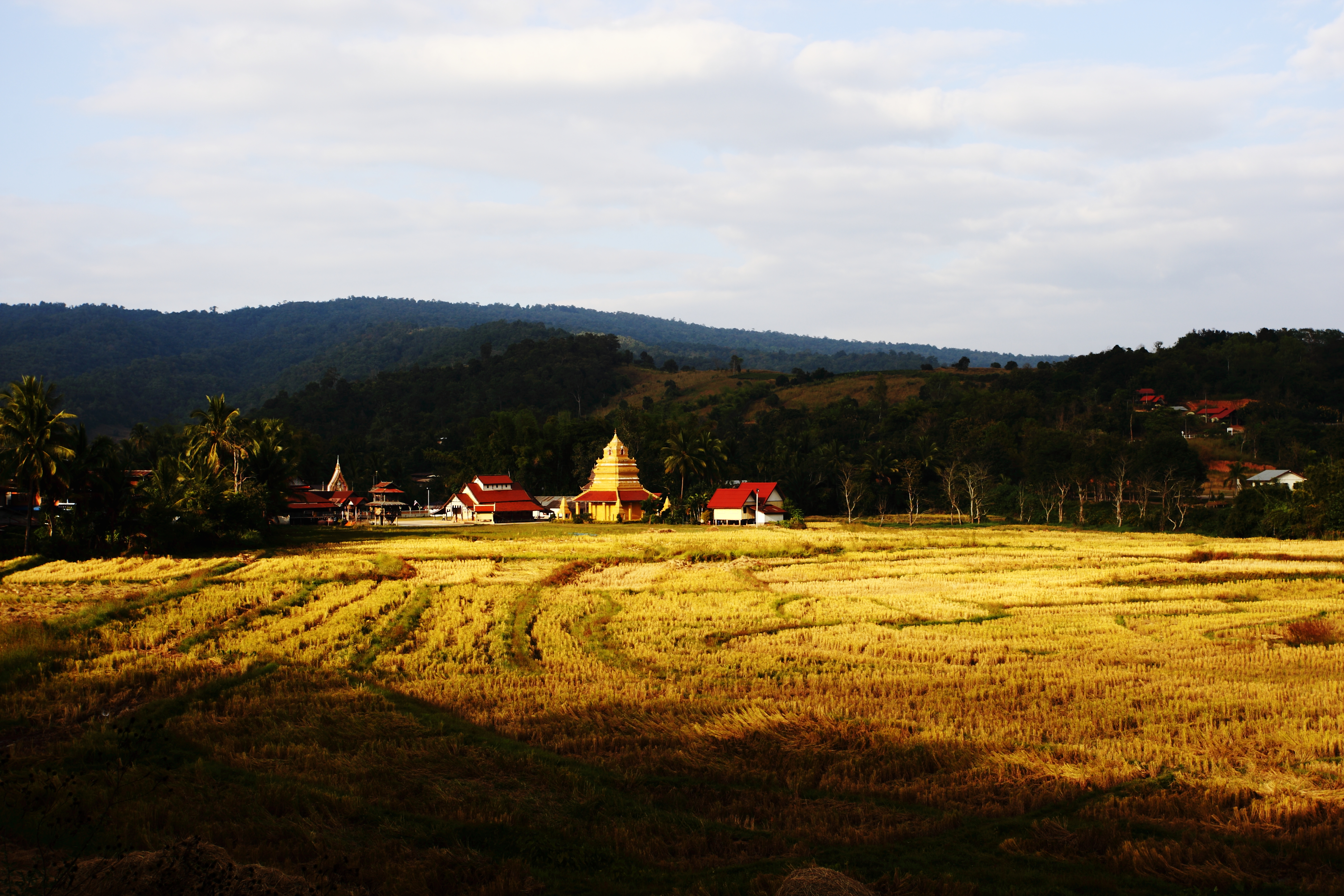
Na Haeo District

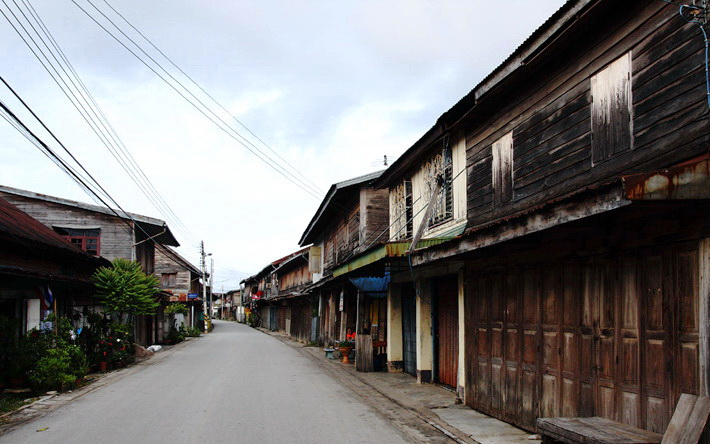
Chiang Khan
