= List of national parks of Thailand =

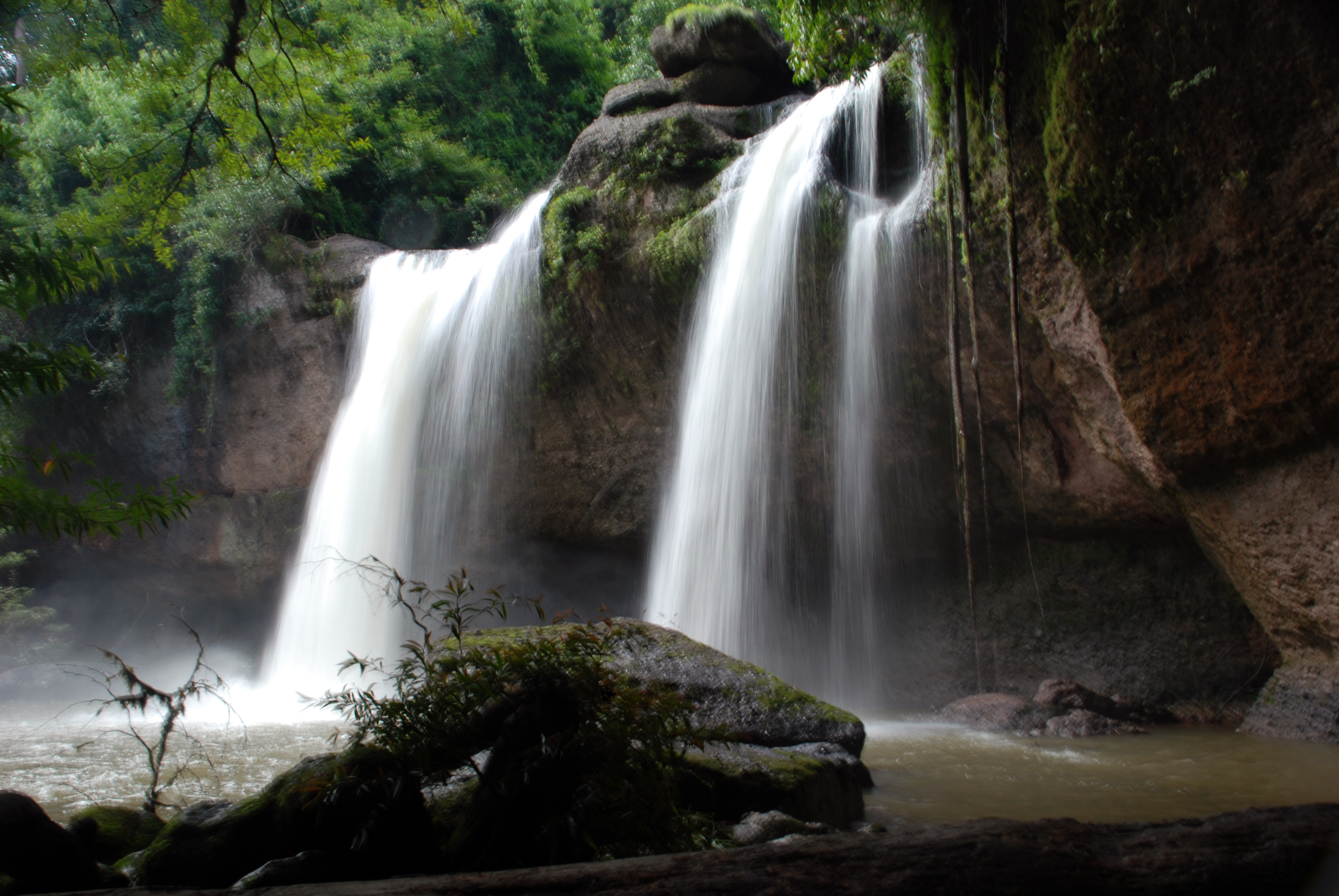
Haeo Suwat waterfall in Khao Yai National Park, Thailand's first national park, designated in 1961.

National parks in Thailand (Thai: อุทยานแห่งชาติ) are defined as areas that contain "natural resources of ecological importance or unique beauty, or flora and fauna of special importance". As of 2019 Thailand's protected areas included 156 national parks, 58 wildlife sanctuaries, 67 non-hunting areas, and 120 forest parks. They cover almost 31 percent of the kingdom's territory.

The parks are administered by the National Parks, Wildlife and Plant Conservation Department (DNP), of the Ministry of Natural Resources and Environment (MNRE). The department was created in 2002, and took over the national parks from the Royal Forest Department of the Ministry of Agriculture.

The first national park was Khao Yai in 1961, when the National Park Act B.E. 2504 was passed. The first marine park was Khao Sam Roi Yot, established in 1966. In 1993 the administration of the national parks was split into two divisions, one for the terrestrial and one for the Marine National Park Division (MNPD).

Controversies about Thailand's national parks include complaints over excessive development and allotment of private concessions. Ko Samet, and other island-based national parks, are particularly impacted by the activities of private concessions, often in the form of excessive bungalow developments. Many of the northern parks are greatly impacted by illegal swidden farming and poaching.

== Thai highlands (Part 1: 19 national parks) ==
Name	Province	Area (km^{2})	Area (sq mi)	Order N.P.	DNP	Gazette date	Gazette source	PARO	Visitors
Doi Inthanon	Chiang Mai	482	186	6		13-06-1978		16	874,372
Doi Pha Hom Pok	Chiang Mai	524	202	97		04-09-2000		16	90,844
Doi Suthep–Pui	Chiang Mai	257	99	24		26-09-1982		16	328,659
Khun Khan	Chiang Mai	208	80	126		18-05-2012		16	587
Mae Takhrai	Chiang Mai, Lamphun	354	137	131		12-12-2017		16	26,562
Mae Wang	Chiang Mai	120	46	112		20-11-2009		16	80,375
Op Luang	Chiang Mai	553	213	68		04-12-1991		16	42,708
Pha Daeng	Chiang Mai	1,123	433	99		02-11-2000		16	44,741
Si Lanna	Chiang Mai	1,405	542	60		08-08-2012		16	81,664
Doi Luang	Chiang Rai, Phayao, Lampang	1,169	451	61		29-11-2005		15	41,016
Khun Chae	Chiang Rai	270	104	80		14-08-1995		15	11,240
Mae Ping	Lamphun, Tak, Chiang Mai	1,004	387	31		21-12-1994		16	39,895
Huai Nam Dang	Mae Hong Son, Chiang Mai	1,252	483	81		14-08-1995		16	164,063
Namtok Mae Surin	Mae Hong Son	397	153	37		29-10-1981		16BR	5,471
Salawin	Mae Hong Son	721	278	78		09-11-1994		16BR	2,054
Tham Pla– Namtok Phu Suea	Mae Hong Son	630	243	116		23-12-2009		16BR	89,047
Doi Phu Nang	Phayao	860	332	127		13-06-2012		15	35,181
Mae Puem	Phayao, Chiang Rai	351	135	120		25-12-2009		15	12,367
Phu Sang	Phayao, Chiang Rai	285	110	98		02-11-2000		15	111,009

=== Not yet published in the Government Gazette (9 national parks) ===
Name	Province	Area (km^{2})	Area (sq mi)	22 N.P. (preparation)	DNP	PARO	Visitors
Doi Wiang Pha	Chiang Mai, Chiang Rai	303	117	13		16	1,704
Mae Tho	Chiang Mai	433	167	3		16	1,327
Namtok Bua Thong- Nam Phu Chet Si	Chiang Mai	86	33	9		16	167,969
Op Khan	Chiang Mai	227	88	15		16	61,832
Lam Nam Kok	Chiang Rai	587	227	18		15	104,844
Phu Chi Fa	Chiang Rai	93	36	21		15	289,755
Tham Luang– Khun Nam Nang Non	Chiang Rai	19	7	7		15	1,573,476
Mae Ngao	Mae Hong Son, Tak	228	86	11		16BR	6,304
Mae Sariang	Mae Hong Son	192	74	12		16BR	0

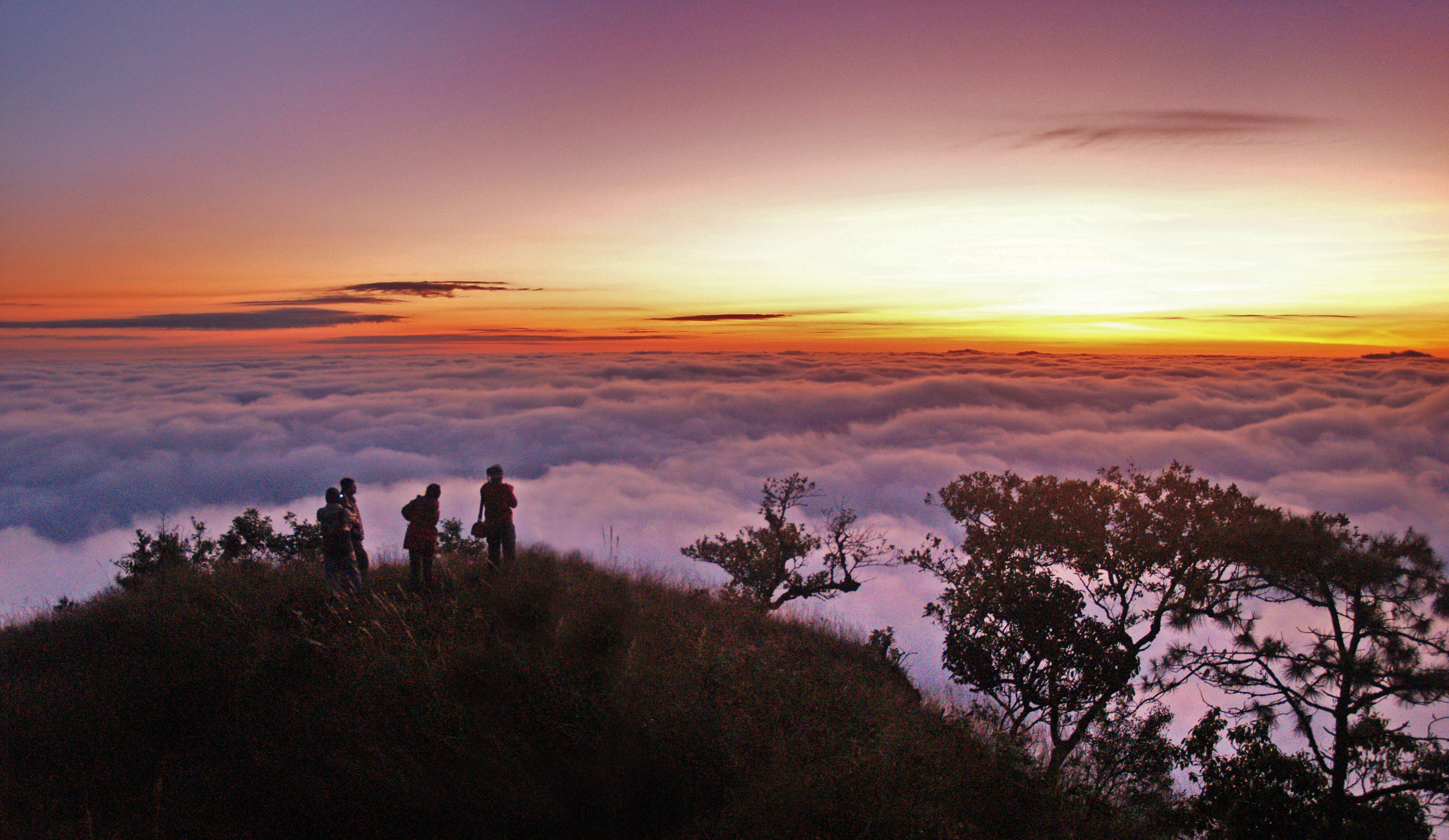
Khun Chae National Park,
Chiang Rai Province

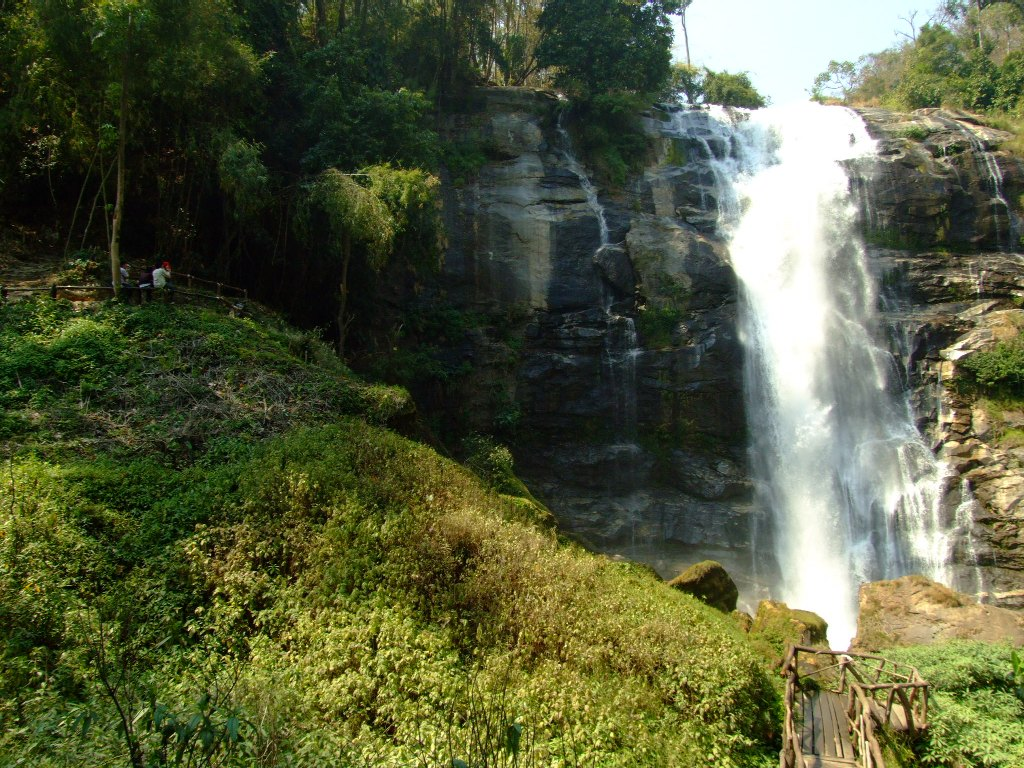
Namtok Wachirathan,
Doi Inthanon National Park

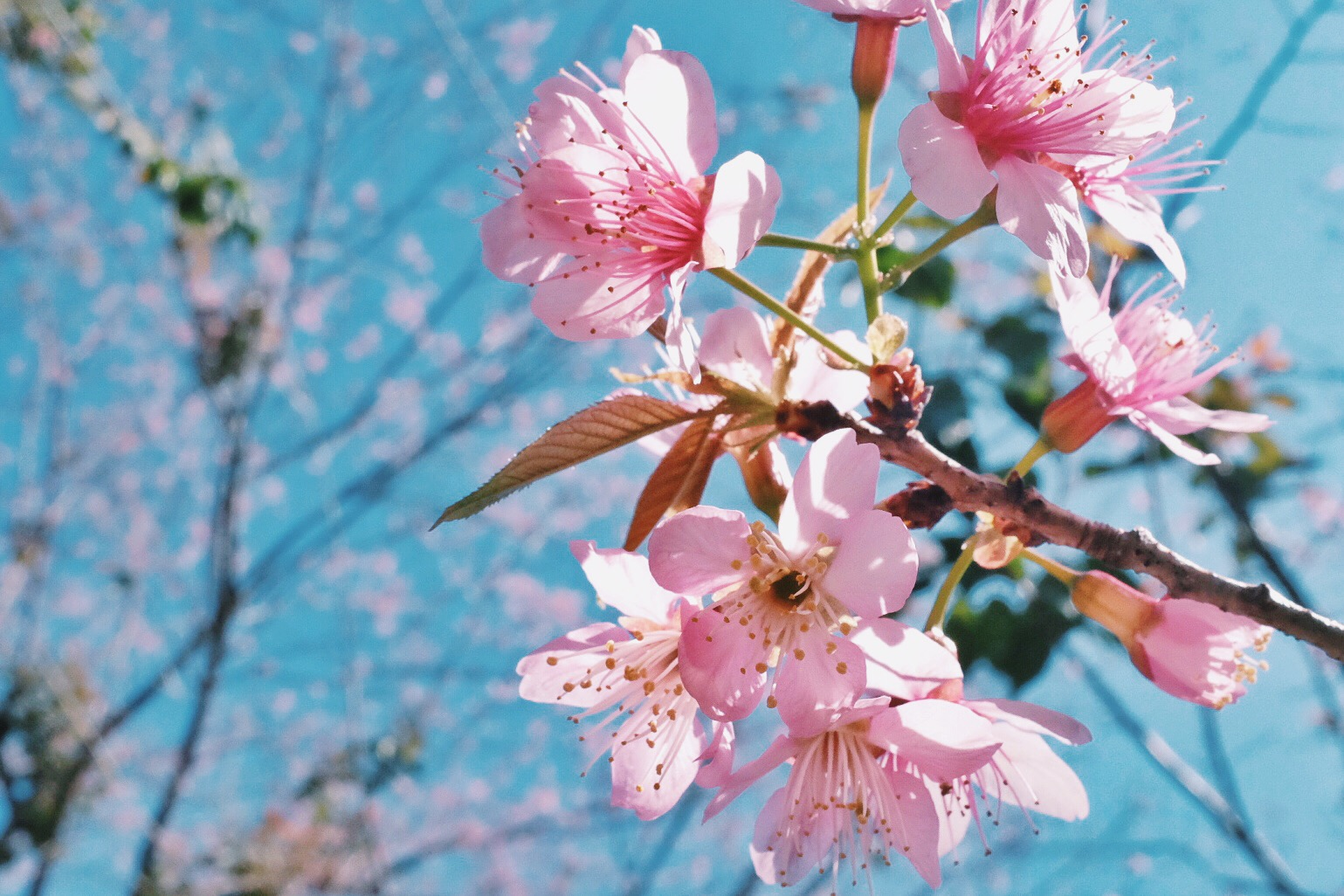
Wild Himalaya Cherry's blooming,
Doi Suthep–Pui National Park

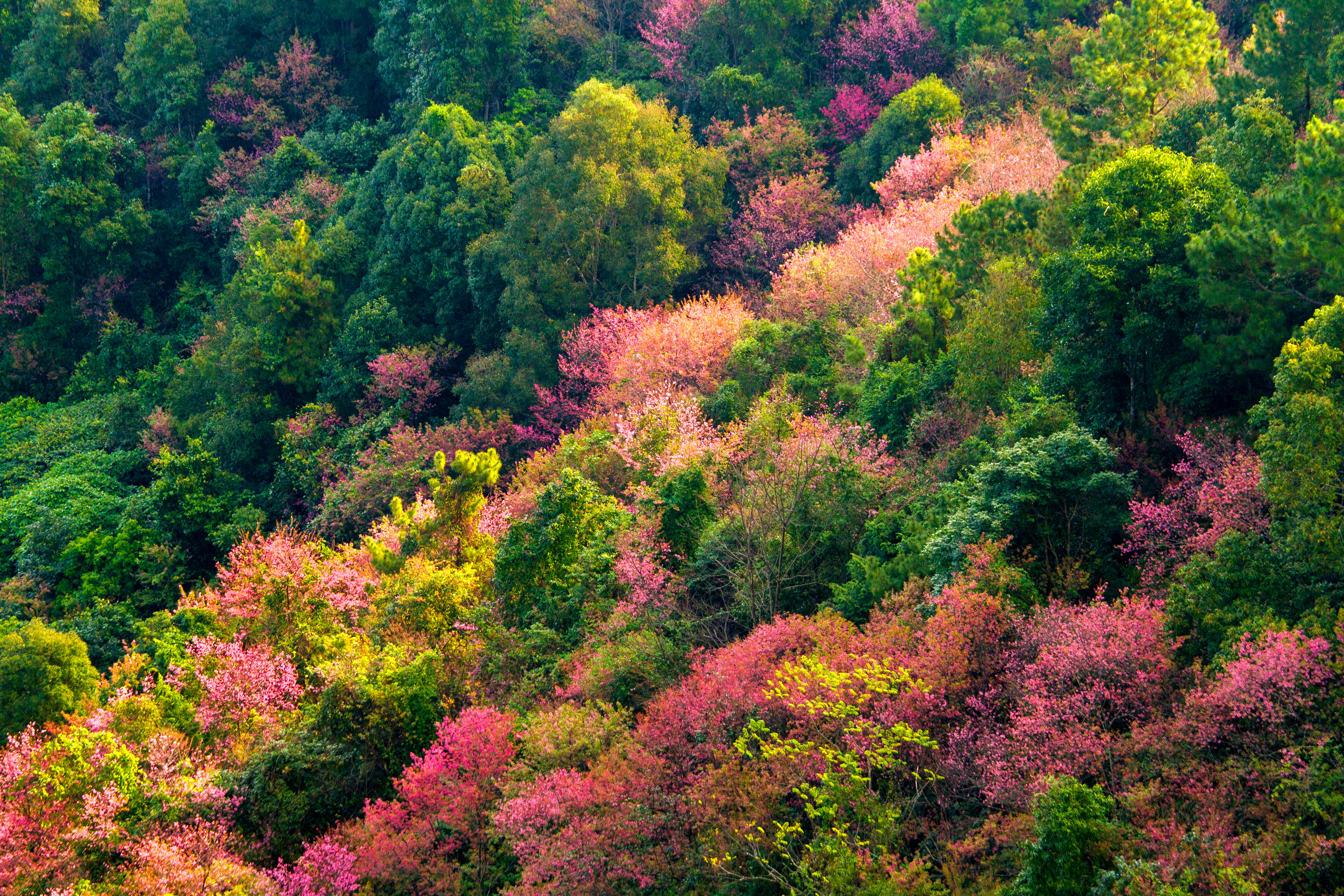
Colorful forests at
Huai Nam Dang National Park

== Thai highlands (Part 2: 31 national parks) ==
Name	Province	Area (km^{2})	Area (sq mi)	Order N.P.	DNP	Gazette date	Gazette source	PARO	Visitors
Khlong Lan	Kamphaeng Phet	300	120	44		25-12-1982		12	206,407
Khlong Wang Chao	Kamphaeng Phet, Tak	747	288	63		29-08-1990		12	33,370
Mae Wong	Kamphaeng Phet, Nakhon Sawan	894	345	54		14-09-1987		12	51,826
Chae Son	Lampang	768	297	58		28-12-2000		13BR	248,381
Doi Chong	Lampang, Lamphun	336	130	130		26-04-2019		13BR	8,827
Mae Wa	Lampang, Tak	582	225	101		17-11-2000		13BR	5,878
Doi Khun Tan	Lamphun, Lampang	255	99	10		05-03-1975		13BR	15,968
Doi Phu Kha	Nan	1,704	658	94		17-06-1999		13	63,102
Khun Nan	Nan	249	96	111		15-07-2009		13	2,645
Khun Sathan	Nan	342	132	130		25-03-2017		13	31,945
Mae Charim	Nan	432	167	106		06-07-2007		13	10,086
Si Nan	Nan	1,024	395	104		25-05-2007		13	115,358
Tham Sakoen	Phayao, Nan	250	97	128		21-04-2016		13	11,987
Khao Kho	Phetchabun	483	186	125		18-05-2012		11	33,609
Nam Nao	Phetchabun	966	373	5		26-09-1982		11	31,840
Tat Mok	Phetchabun	290	110	87		30-10-1998		11	17,872
Namtok Chat Trakan	Phitsanulok	543	210	55		02-11-1987		11	13,033
Phu Hin Rong Kla	Phitsanulok, Loei	307	119	48		26-07-1984		11	289,210
Thung Salaeng Luang	Phitsanulok, Phetchabun	1,262	487	3		27-05-1975		11	52,126
Doi Pha Klong	Phrae	189	73	107		06-07-2007		13	3,891
Mae Yom	Phrae, Lampang	455	175	51		01-03-1986		13	6,738
Wiang Kosai	Phrae, Lampang	410	158	35		12-05-2011		13	22,860
Ramkhamhaeng	Sukhothai	341	132	18		27-10-1980		14	23,356
Si Satchanalai	Sukhothai	213	82	26		08-05-1981		14	10,569
Khun Phawo	Tak	397	153	115		23-12-2009		14	10,307
Lan Sang	Tak	104	40	15		14-05-1979		14	38,882
Mae Moei	Tak	185	71	92		20-05-1999		14	8,836
Taksin Maharat	Tak	149	58	38		23-12-1981		14	30,194
Lam Nam Nan	Uttaradit, Phrae	999	386	84		30-09-1998		11	27,926
Phu Soi Dao	Uttaradit	340	130	109		28-05-2008		11	19,706
Ton Sak Yai	Uttaradit	519	200	103		04-12-2003		11	4,089

=== Not yet published in the Government Gazette (6 national parks) ===
Name	Province	Area (km^{2})	Area (sq mi)	22 N.P. (preparation)	DNP	PARO	Visitors
Khelang Banphot	Lampang	80	31	5		13BR	1,575
Tham Pha Thai	Lampang	1,230	463	1		13BR	33,873
Nanthaburi	Nan	427	165	2		13	5,248
Khwae Noi	Phitsanulok	198	76	8		11	5,692
Doi Soi Malai	Tak	355	137	17		14	28,155
Namtok Pha Charoen	Tak	770	297	14		14	152,539

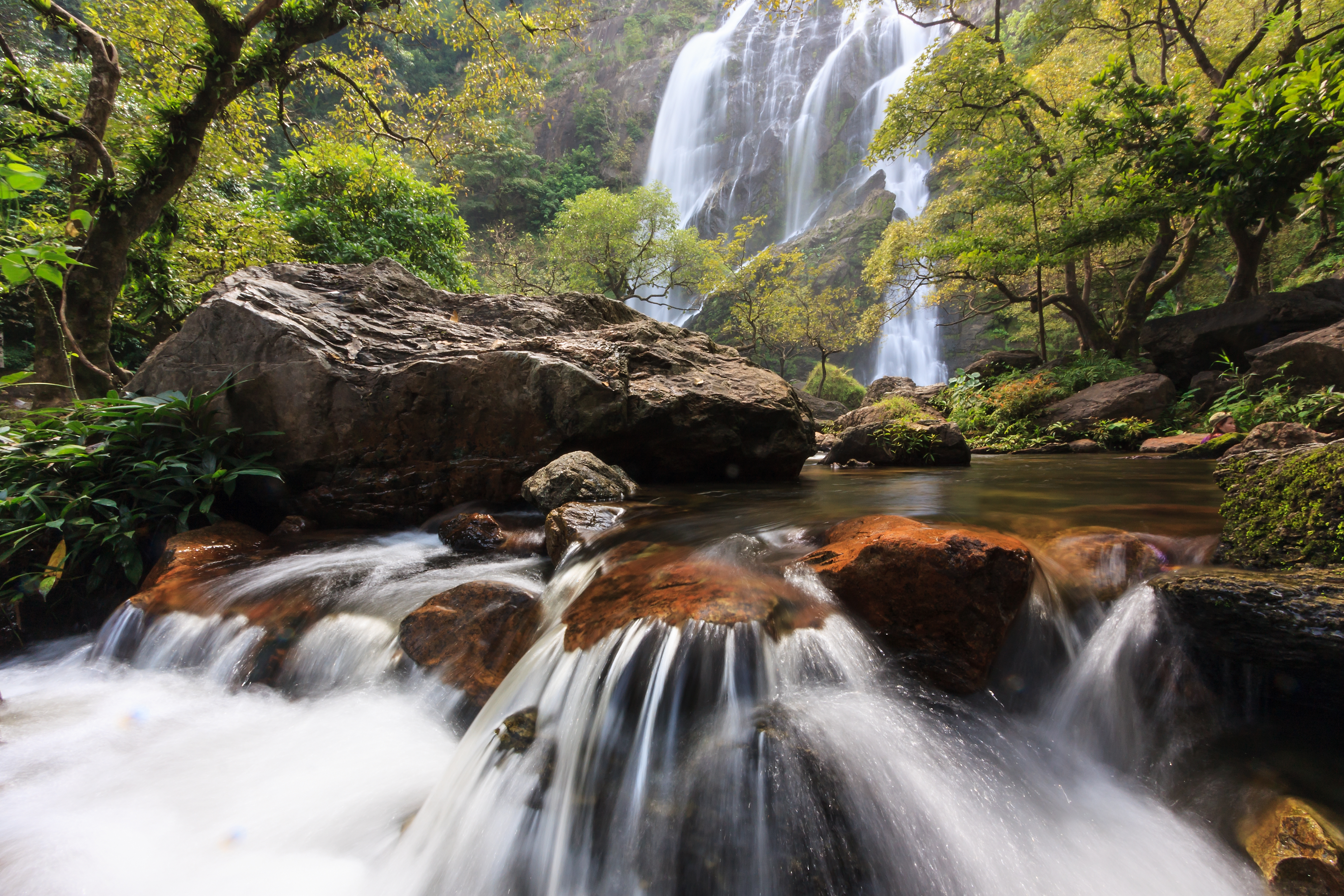
Waterfall Khlong Lan National Park,
Kamphaeng Phet Province

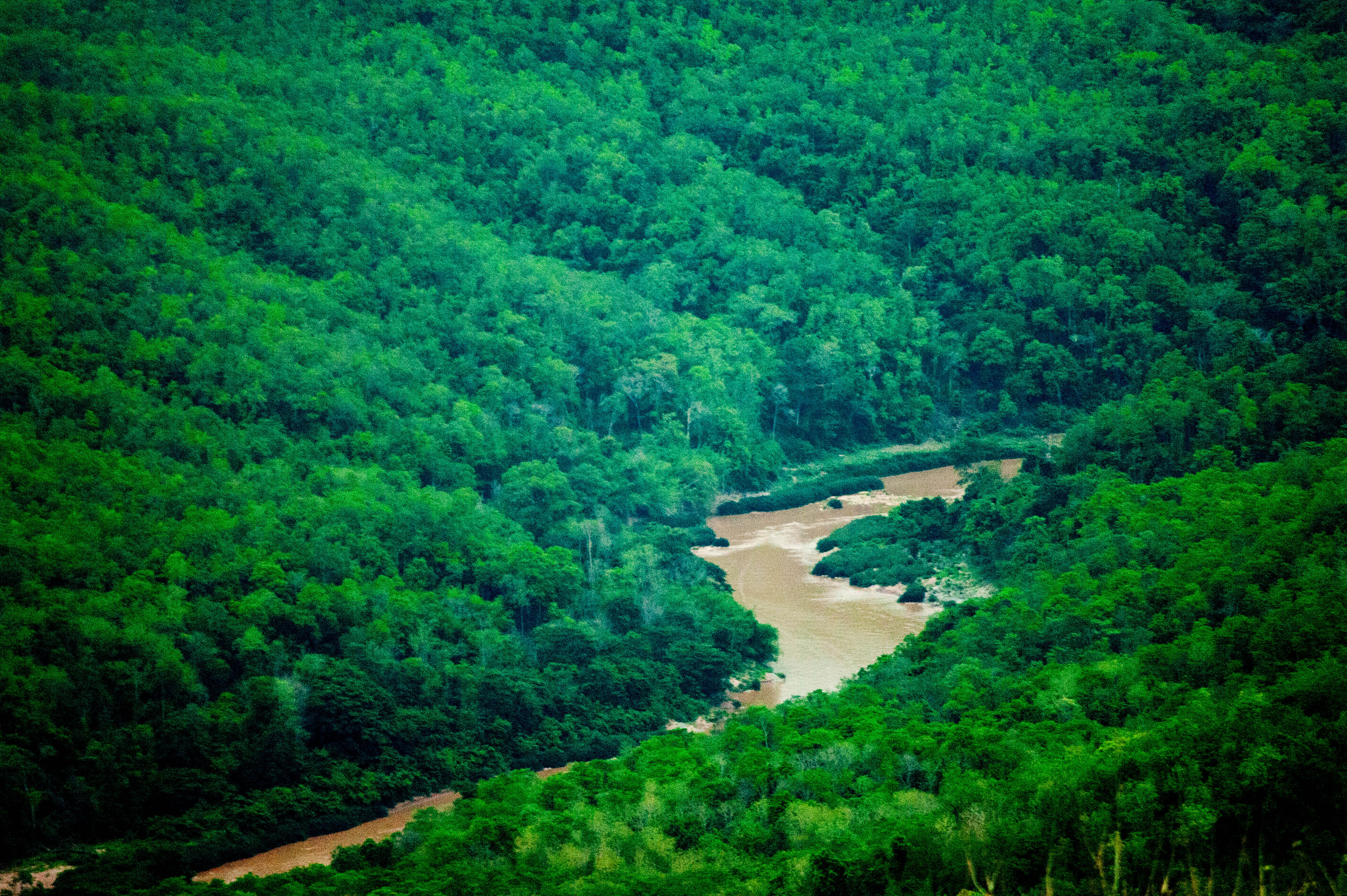
Nan River meanders through
Si Nan National Park

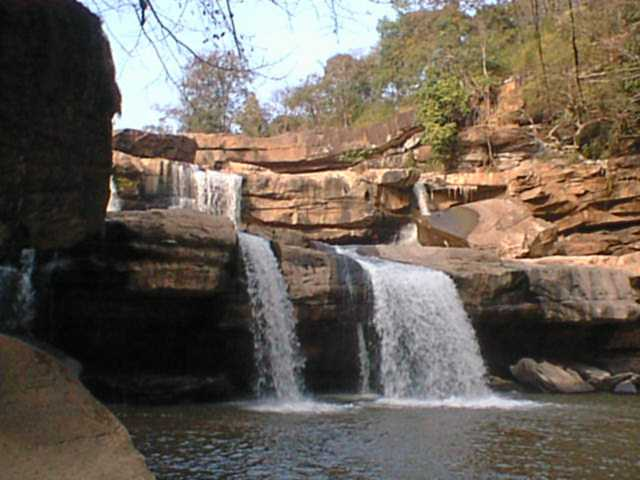
Namtok Kaeng Sopha,
Thung Salaeng Luang N.P.

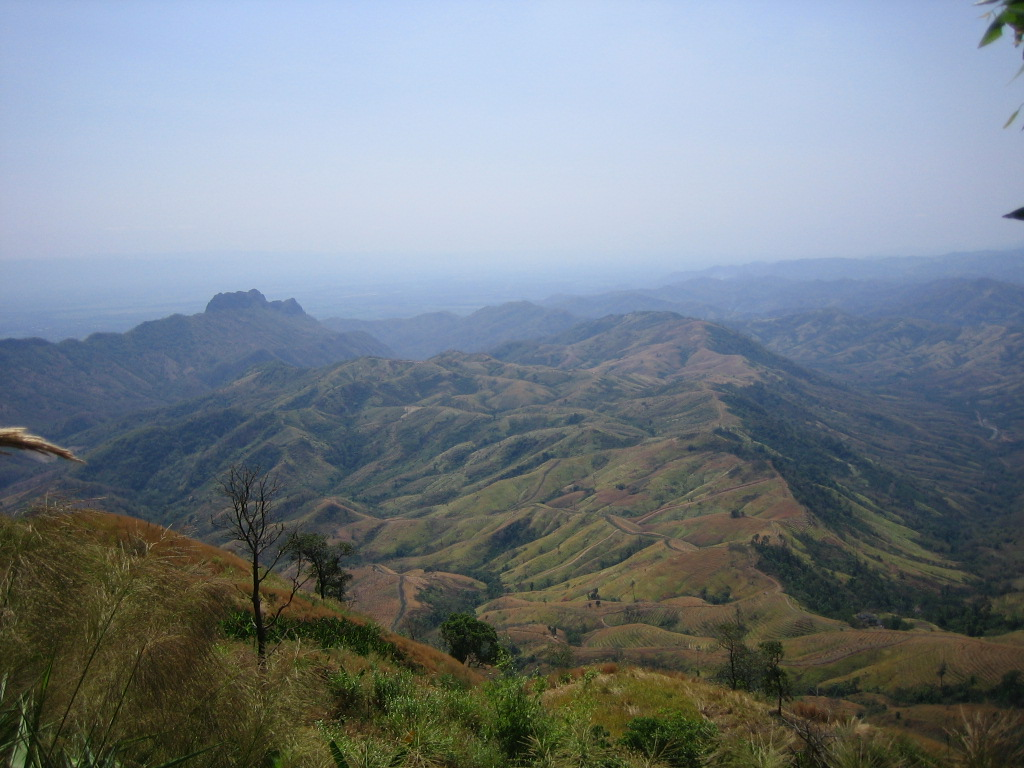
Phu Hin Rong Kla National Park, Loei, Phitsanulok and Phetchabun.

== Northeast (21 national parks) ==
Name	Province	Area (km^{2})	Area (sq mi)	Order N.P.	DNP	Gazette date	Gazette source	PARO	Visitors
Pa Hin Ngam	Chaiyaphum	100	39	105		06-06-2007		7	106,428
Phu Laenkha	Chaiyaphum	200	77	108		27-07-2007		7	93,869
Sai Thong	Chaiyaphum	319	123	77		30-12-1992		7	51,233
Tat Ton	Chaiyaphum	217	84	23		31-12-1980		7	388,665
Nam Phong	Khon Kaen, Chaiyaphum	197	76	100		15-11-2000		8	68,273
Phu Kao– Phu Phan Kham	Nong Bua Lamphu, Khon Kaen	318	123	50		09-04-2010		10	4,337
Phu Pha Man	Khon Kaen, Loei	350	135	72		08-12-1991		8	9,682
Phu Wiang	Khon Kaen	325	125	71		08-12-1991		8	6,150
Phu Kradueng	Loei	348	134	2		25-10-1978		8	86,259
Phu Ruea	Loei	121	47	16		26-07-1979		8	169,643
Phu Suan Sai	Loei	117	45	79		23-11-1994		8	9,907
Phu Pha Thoep	Mukdahan	48	19	59		18-07-2003		9	47,609
Phu Sa Dok Bua	Mukdahan, Yasothon, Amnat Charoen	231	89	75		30-12-1992		9	1,812
Phu Langka	Nakhon Phanom, Bueng Kan	50	19	117		23-12-2009		10	24,151
Phu Pha Lek	Sakon Nakhon, Udon Thani, Kalasin	404	156	118		23-12-2009		10	1,036
Phu Phan	Sakon Nakhon, Kalasin	665	257	7		29-10-1982		10	4,895
Phu Pha Yon	Sakon Nakhon, Nakhon Phanom, Mukdahan	829	320	57		28-07-1988		10	5,025
Khao Phra Wihan	Sisaket, Ubon Ratchathani	130	50	83		20-03-1998		9	202,616
Kaeng Tana	Ubon Ratchathani	80	31	33		13-07-1981		9	31,170
Pha Taem	Ubon Ratchathani	340	130	74		30-12-1991		9	180,155
Phu Chong–Na Yoi	Ubon Ratchathani	686	265	53		01-06-1987		9	86,252

=== Not yet published in the Government Gazette (2 national parks) ===
Name	Province	Area (km^{2})	Area (sq mi)	22 N.P. (preparation)	DNP	PARO	Visitors
Phu Hin Chom That– Phu Phra Bat	Nong Bua Lamphu, Udon Thani, Loei	177	68	20		10	12,162
Na Yung–Nam Som	Udon Thani, Loei; Nong Khai	397	153	10		10	8,357

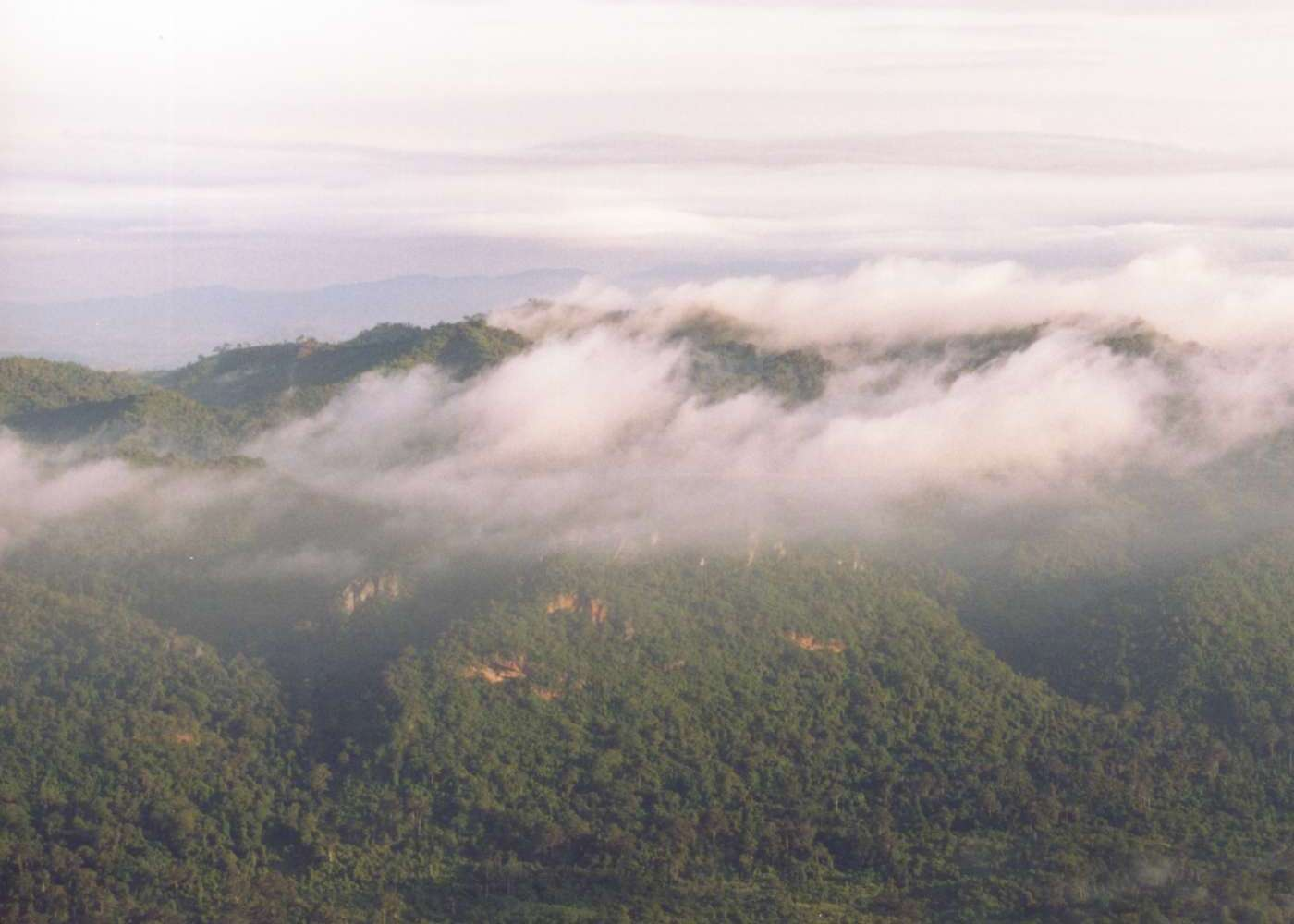
Pa Hin Ngam National Park

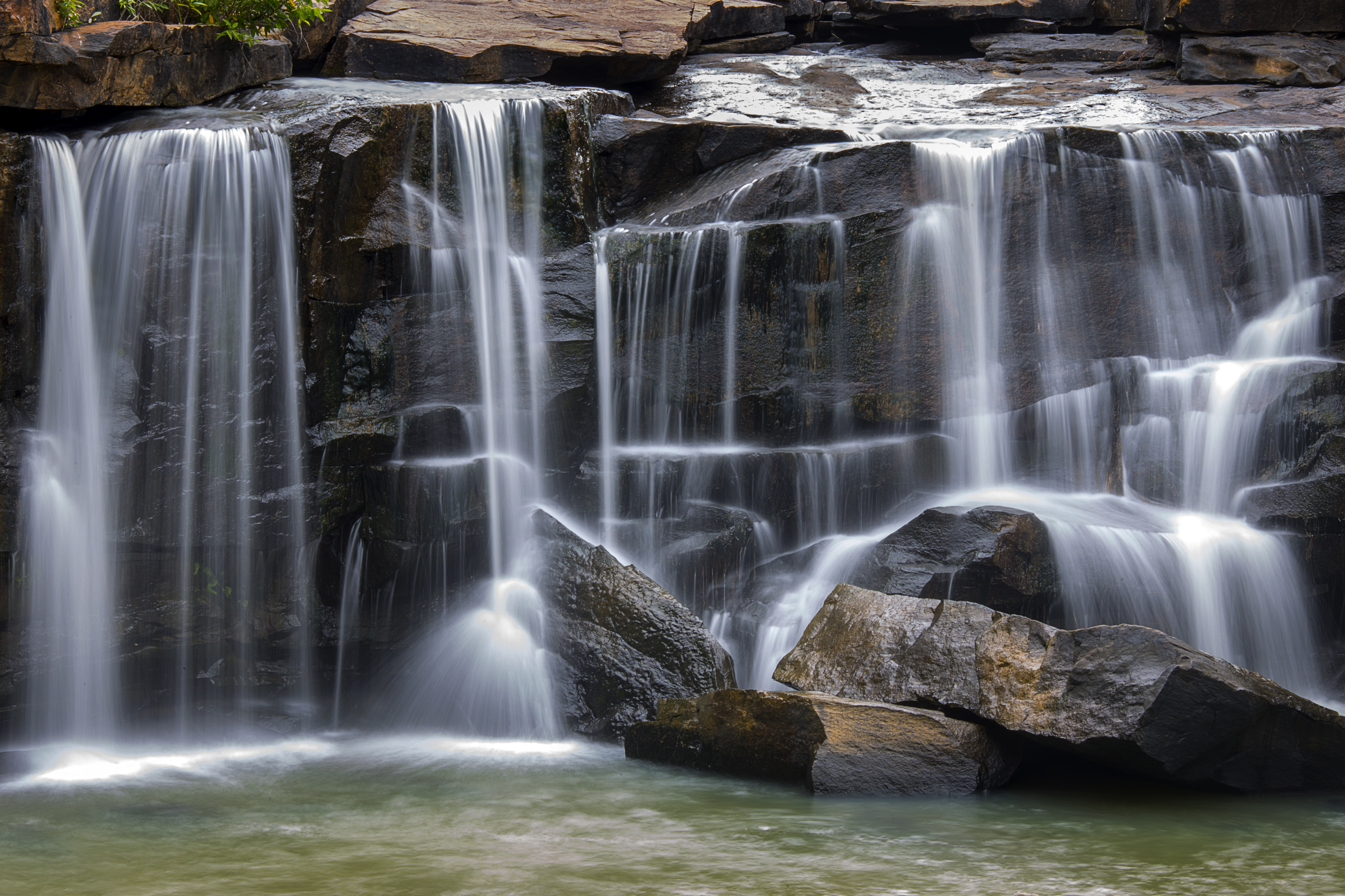
Tat Ton Waterfall in National Park,
Chaiyaphum Province

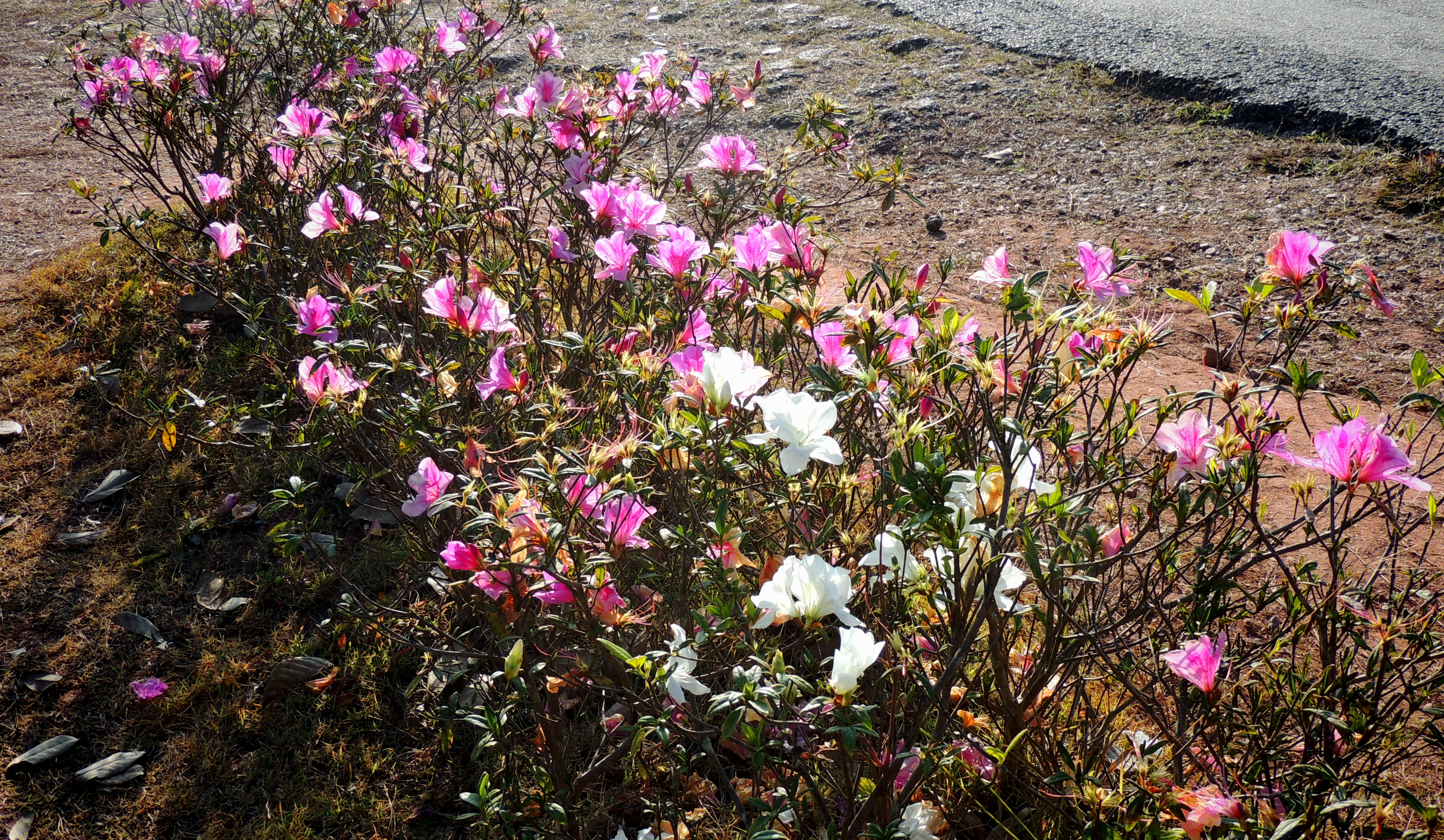
Fowers of Phu Ruea National Park,
Loei Province

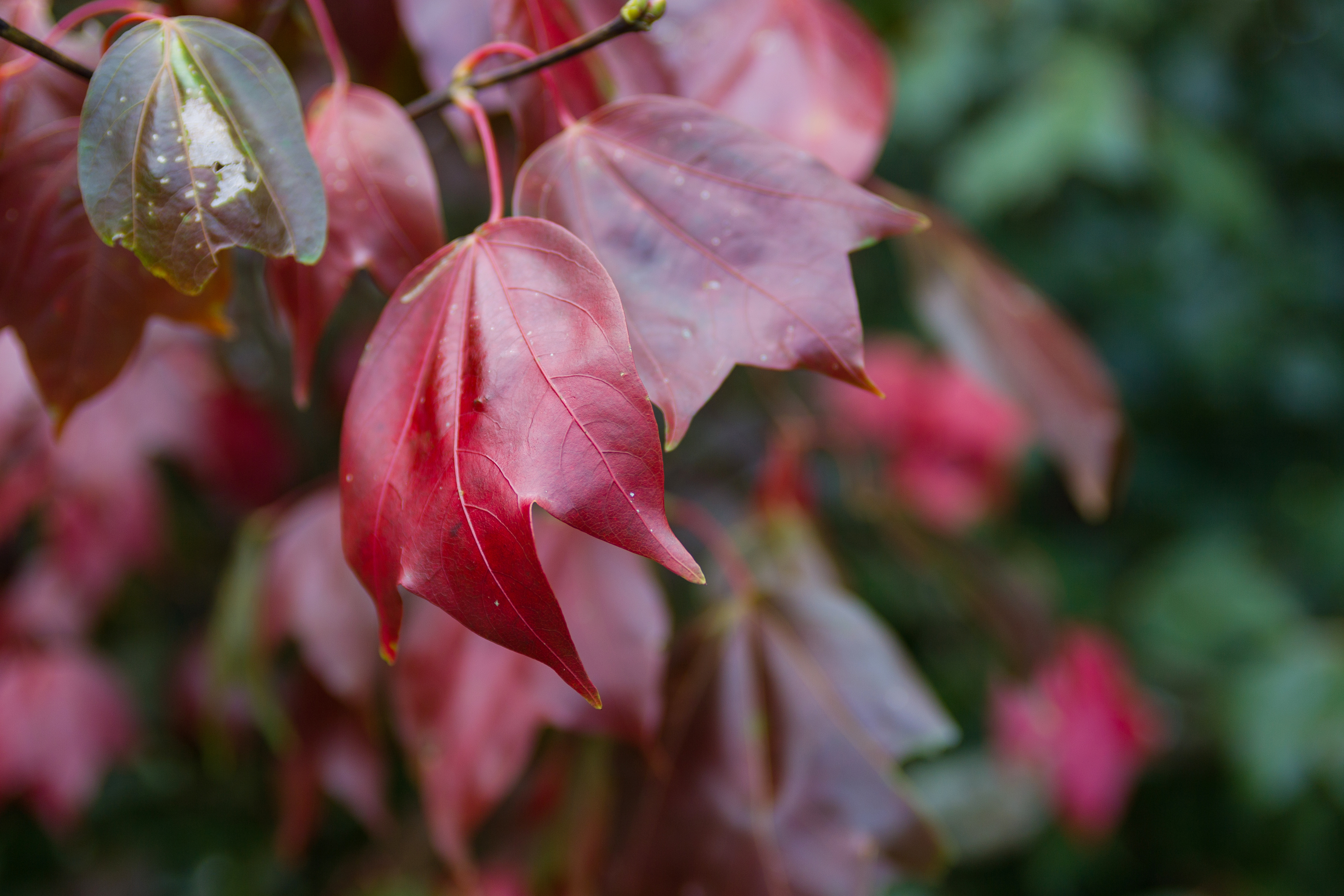
Acer calcaratum at
Phu Kradueng National Park

== Central-East (27 national parks) ==
Name	Province	Area (km^{2})	Area (sq mi)	Order N.P.	DNP	Gazette date	Gazette source	PARO	Visitors
Ta Phraya	Buriram, Sa Kaeo	594	229	82		22-11-1996		1	3,398
Khao Khitchakut	Chanthaburi	59	23	14		24-09-1998		2	1,179,671
Khao Sip Ha Chan	Chanthaburi	118	46	122		25-12-2009		2	9,557
Namtok Phlio	Chanthaburi	135	52	11		02-05-1975		2	671,396
Chaloem Rattanakosin	Kanchanaburi	59	23	17		12-02-1980		3	31,536
Erawan	Kanchanaburi	550	210	12		14-08-1975		3	650,852
Khao Laem	Kanchanaburi	1,497	578	67		14-08-2009		3	66,192
Khuean Srinagarindra	Kanchanaburi	1,532	592	39		23-12-1981		3	145,254
Lam Khlong Ngu	Kanchanaburi	673	260	123		25-12-2009		3	4,032
Sai Yok	Kanchanaburi	500	190	19		27-10-1980		3	117,401
Thong Pha Phum	Kanchanaburi	1,236	477	114		23-12-2009		3	112,332
Khao Yai	Nakhon Ratchasima, Nakhon Nayok, Prachinburi, Saraburi	2,166	836	1		18-09-1962		1	1,551,449
Kaeng Krachan	Phetchaburi, Prachuap Khiri Khan	2,915	1,125	28		24-09-1998		3BR	103,510
Thap Lan	Prachinburi, Nakhon Ratchasima	2,236	863	40		07-07-1989		1	57,075
Hat Wanakon^{a}	Prachuap Khiri Khan	38	15	76		30-12-1992		3BR	43,268
Khao Sam Roi Yot^{a}	Prachuap Khiri Khan	98	38	4		01-04-1982		3BR	164,735
Kui Buri	Prachuap Khiri Khan	969	374	90		25-03-1999		3BR	20,746
Namtok Huai Yang	Prachuap Khiri Khan	161	62	70		08-12-1991		3BR	26,906
Chaloem Phrakiat Thai Prachan	Ratchaburi	329	127	124		24-01-2012		3	75,278
Khao Chamao– Khao Wong	Rayong, Chanthaburi	84	32	13		31-12-1975		2	218,430
Khao Laem Ya– Mu Ko Samet^{a}	Rayong	131	51	34		01-10-1981		2	1,619,908
Pang Sida	Sa Kaeo	844	326	41		22-02-1982		1	58,382
Namtok Chet Sao Noi	Saraburi, Nakhon; Ratchasima	42	16	129		26-12-2016		1BR	389,101
Namtok Sam Lan	Saraburi	45	17	27		26-05-2017		1BR	45,828
Phu Toei	Suphanburi	317	122	86		30-09-1998		3	8,830
Mu Ko Chang^{a}	Trat	650	250	45		31-12-1982		2	249,895
Namtok Khlong Kaeo	Trat	198	76	121		25-12-2009		2	25,814

=== Not yet published in the Government Gazette (1 national park) ===
Name	Province	Area (km^{2})	Area (sq mi)	22 N.P. (preparation)	DNP	PARO	Visitors
Ao Siam	Prachuap Khiri Khan	13	5	4		3BR	19,357

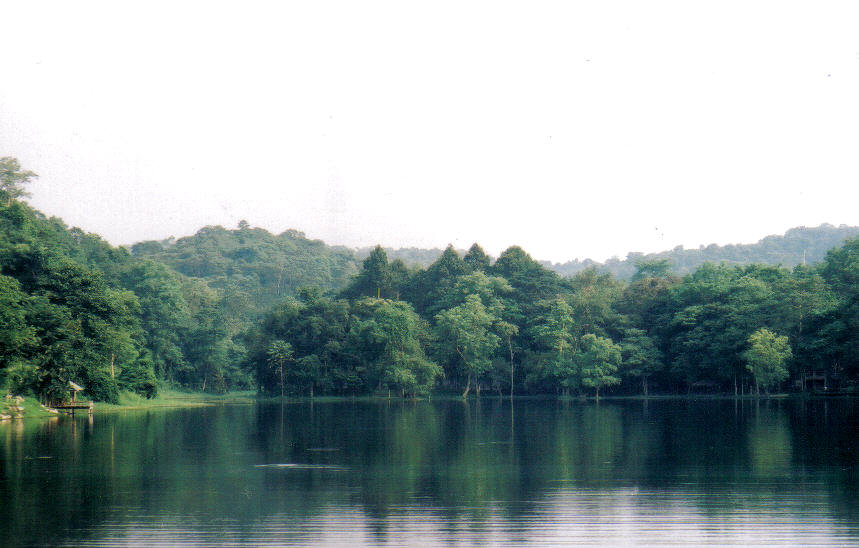
Namtok Sam Lan National Park,
Saraburi Province

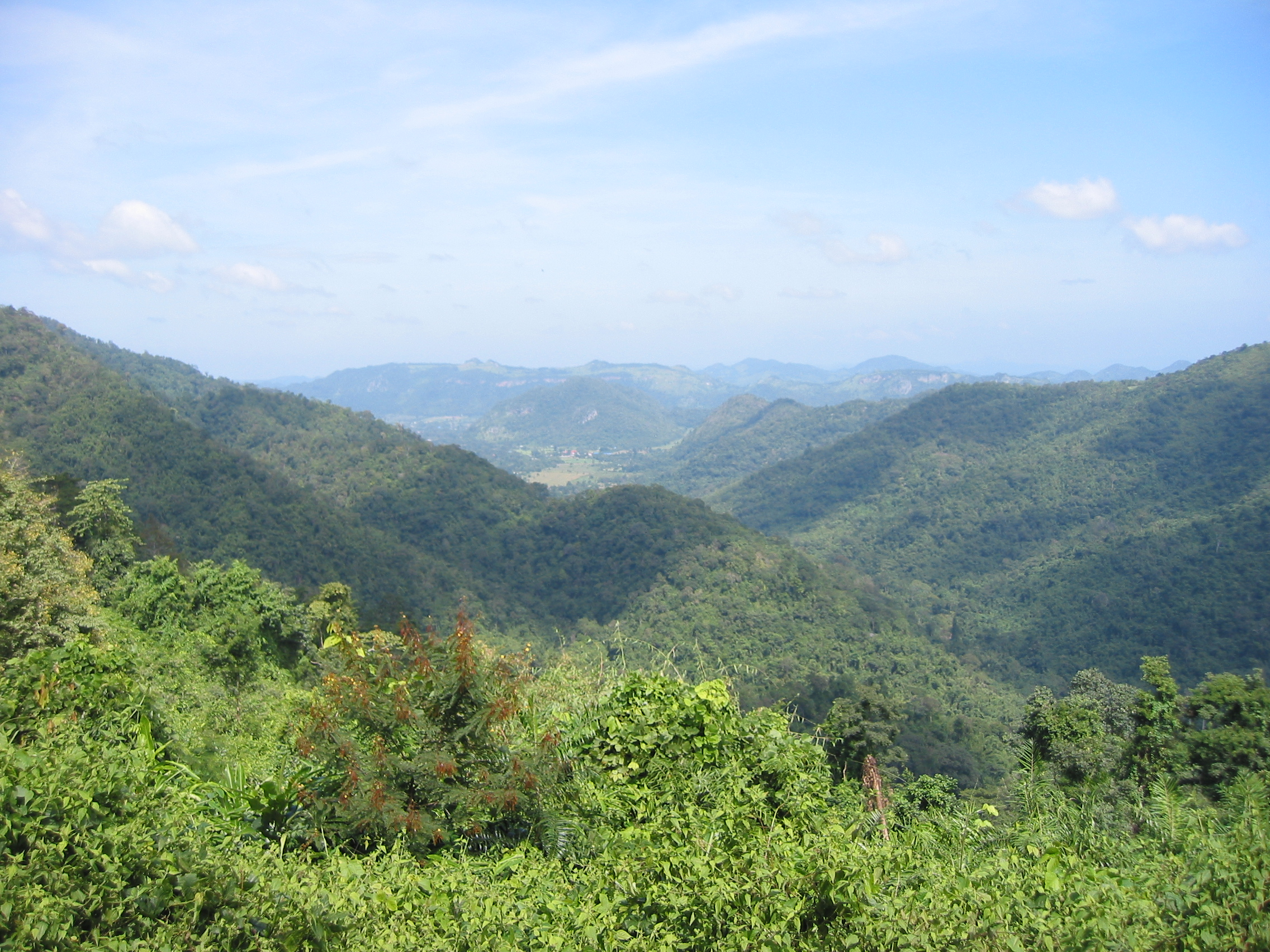
Khao Yai National Park,
the second largest in Thailand

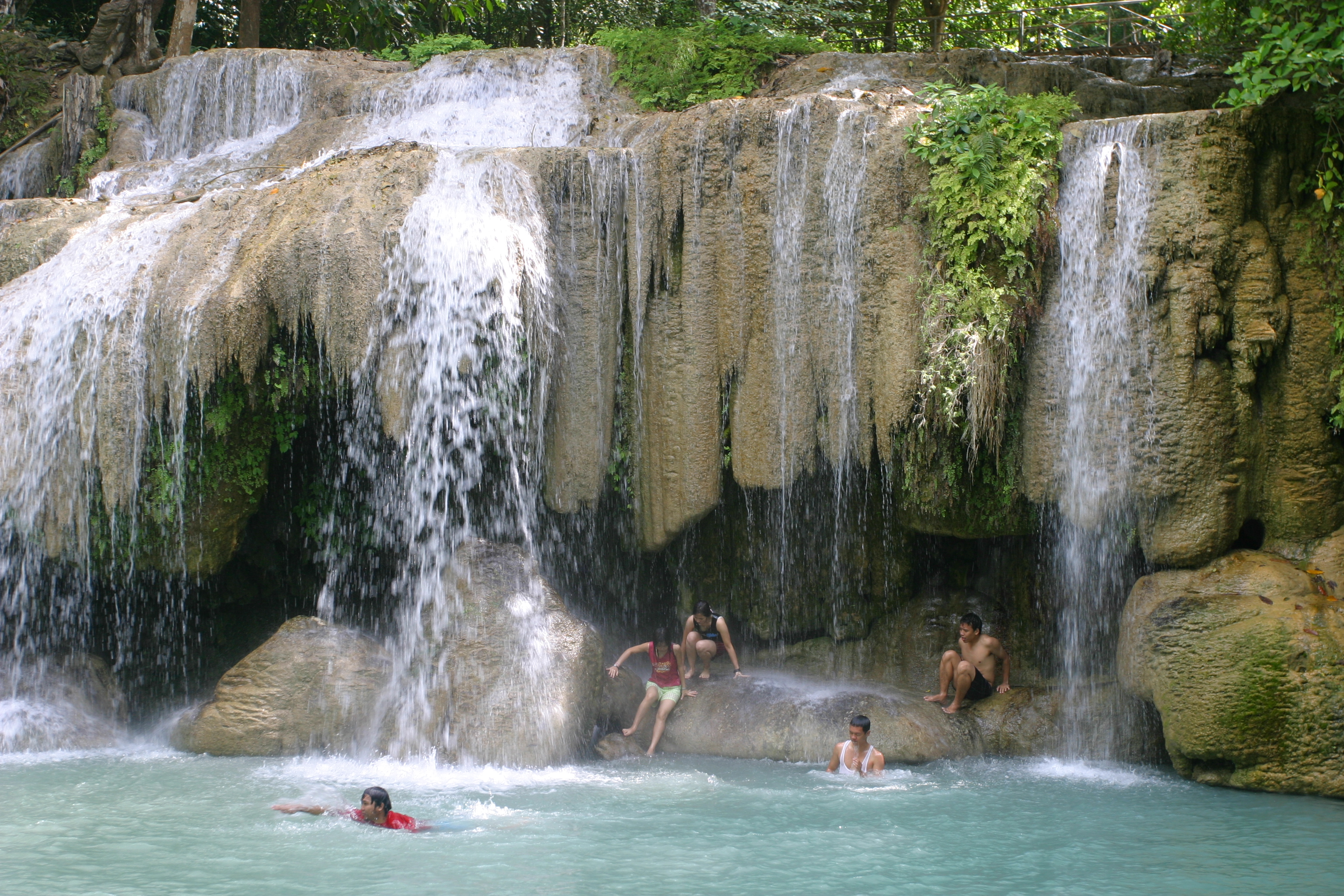
Waterfall at Erawan National Park,
Kanchanaburi Province

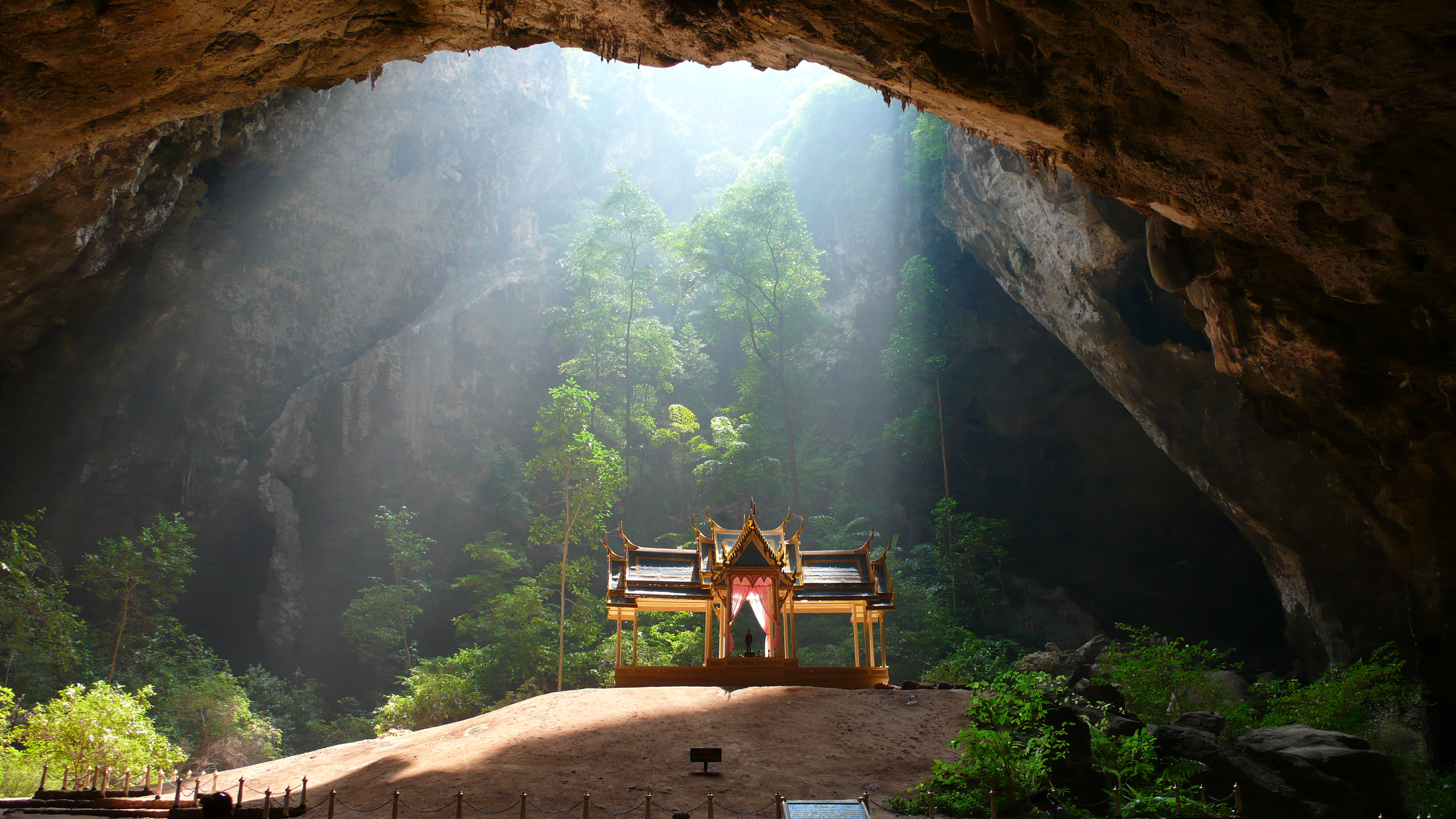
Phraya Nakhon Cave in
Khao Sam Roi Yot National Park

== South (east coast: 15 national parks) ==
Name	Province	Area (km^{2})	Area (sq mi)	Order N.P.	DNP	Gazette date	Gazette source	PARO	Visitors
Mu Ko Chumphon^{a}	Chumphon	317	122	89		24-02-1999		4	52,919
Khao Luang	Nakhon Si Thammarat	570	220	9		18-12-1974		5	84,649
Khao Nan	Nakhon Si Thammarat	410	158	113		23-11-2009		5	6,772
Namtok Si Khit	Nakhon Si Thammarat, Surat Thani	145	56	95		17-06-1999		5	17,003
Namtok Yong	Nakhon Si Thammarat	205	79	64		22-07-1991		5	97,604
Budo–Su-ngai Padi	Narathiwat, Pattani, Yala	341	132	96		17-06-1999		6BR	35,913
Namtok Sai Khao	Pattani, Yala, Songkhla	70	27	110		28-05-2008		6BR	105,163
Khao Pu–Khao Ya	Phattalung, Trang, Nakhon Si Thammarat	694	268	42		27-05-1982		6	167,309
Namtok Ngao	Ranong, Chumphon	668	258	93		02-06-1999		4	125,815
Khao Nam Khang	Songkhla	212	82	65		22-07-1991		6	1,789
Kaeng Krung	Surat Thani	541	209	69		04-12-1991		4	909
Mu Ko Ang Thong^{a}	Surat Thani	102	39	21		12-11-1980		4	134,315
Tai Rom Yen	Surat Thani	425	164	73		30-12-1991		4	14,436
Than Sadet– Ko Pha-ngan	Surat Thani	43	17	132		22-11-2018		4	158,090
Bang Lang	Yala	261	101	88		24-02-1999		6BR	10,985

^{a} Marine parks

=== Not yet published in the Government Gazette (4 national parks) ===
Name	Province	Area (km^{2})	Area (sq mi)	22 N.P. (preparation)	DNP	PARO	Visitors
Hat Khanom– Mu Ko Thale Tai^{a}	Nakhon Si Thammarat, Surat Thani	312	120	16		5	24,455
Ao Manao– Khao Tanyong	Narathiwat	24	9	22		6BR	95,961
Namtok Si Po	Narathiwat	66	25	19		6BR	25,831
San Kala Khiri	Songkhla	143	55	6		6	7,527

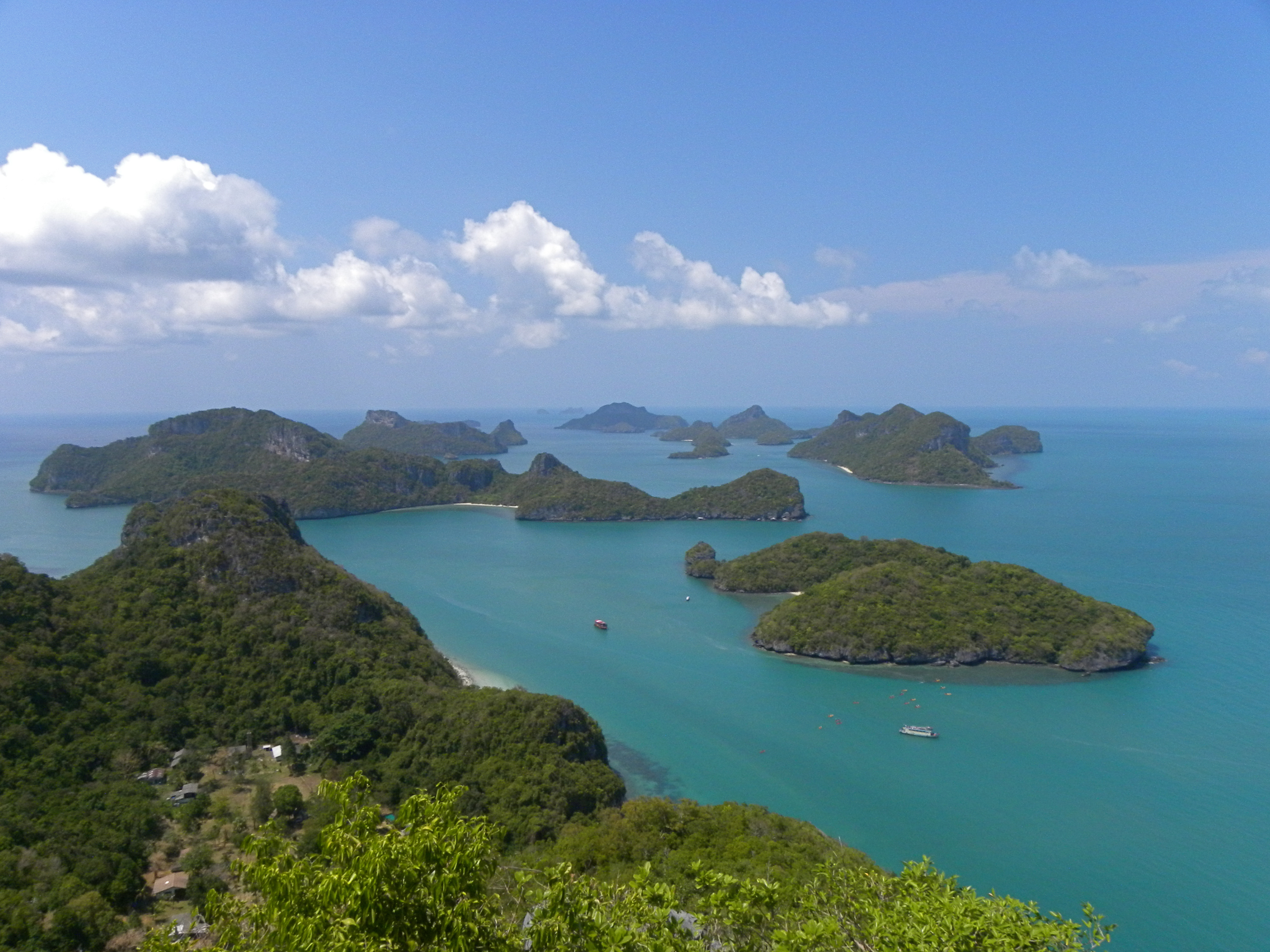
Mu Ko Ang Thong National Park

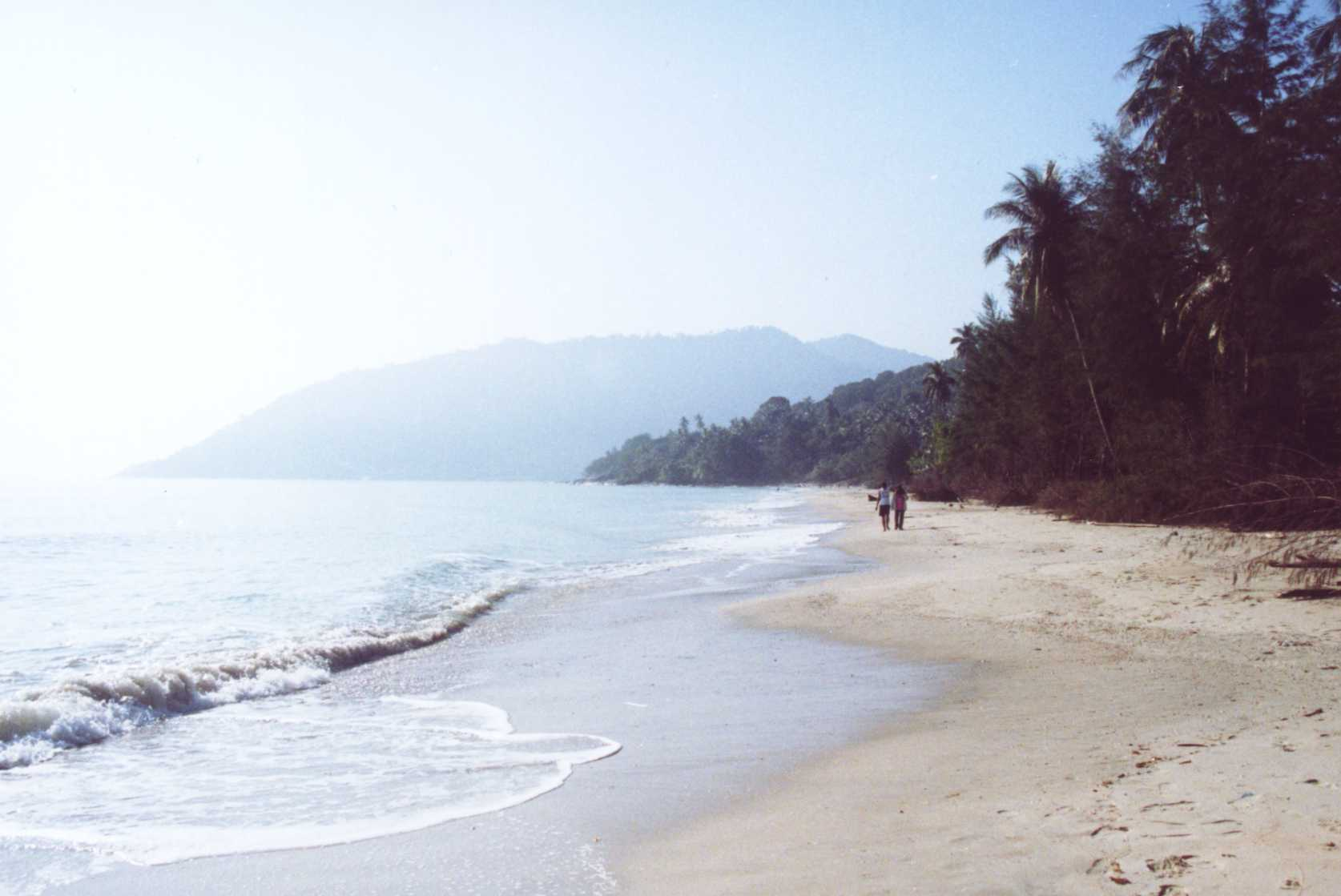
Hat Khanom–Mu Ko Tai N.P.

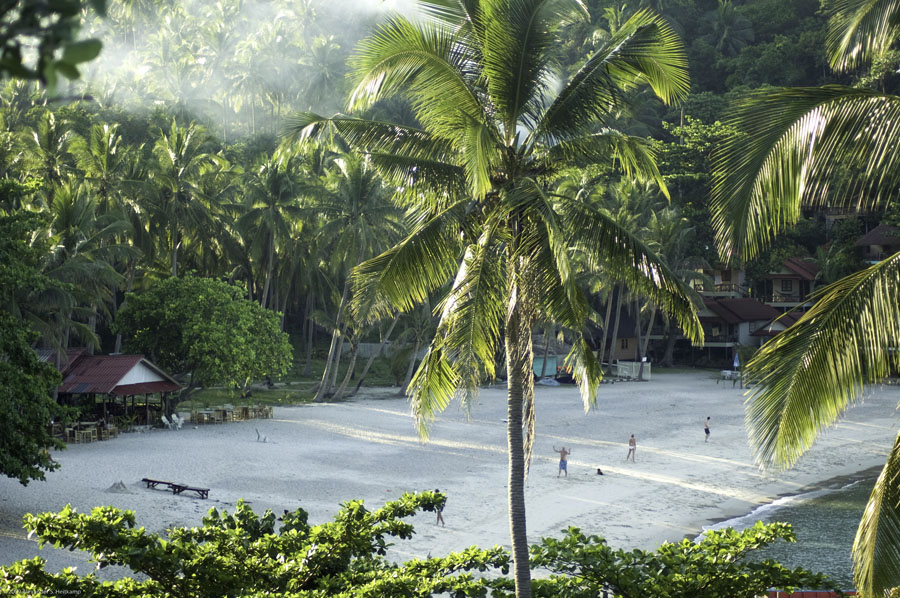
Than Sadet–Ko Pha-Ngan N.P.

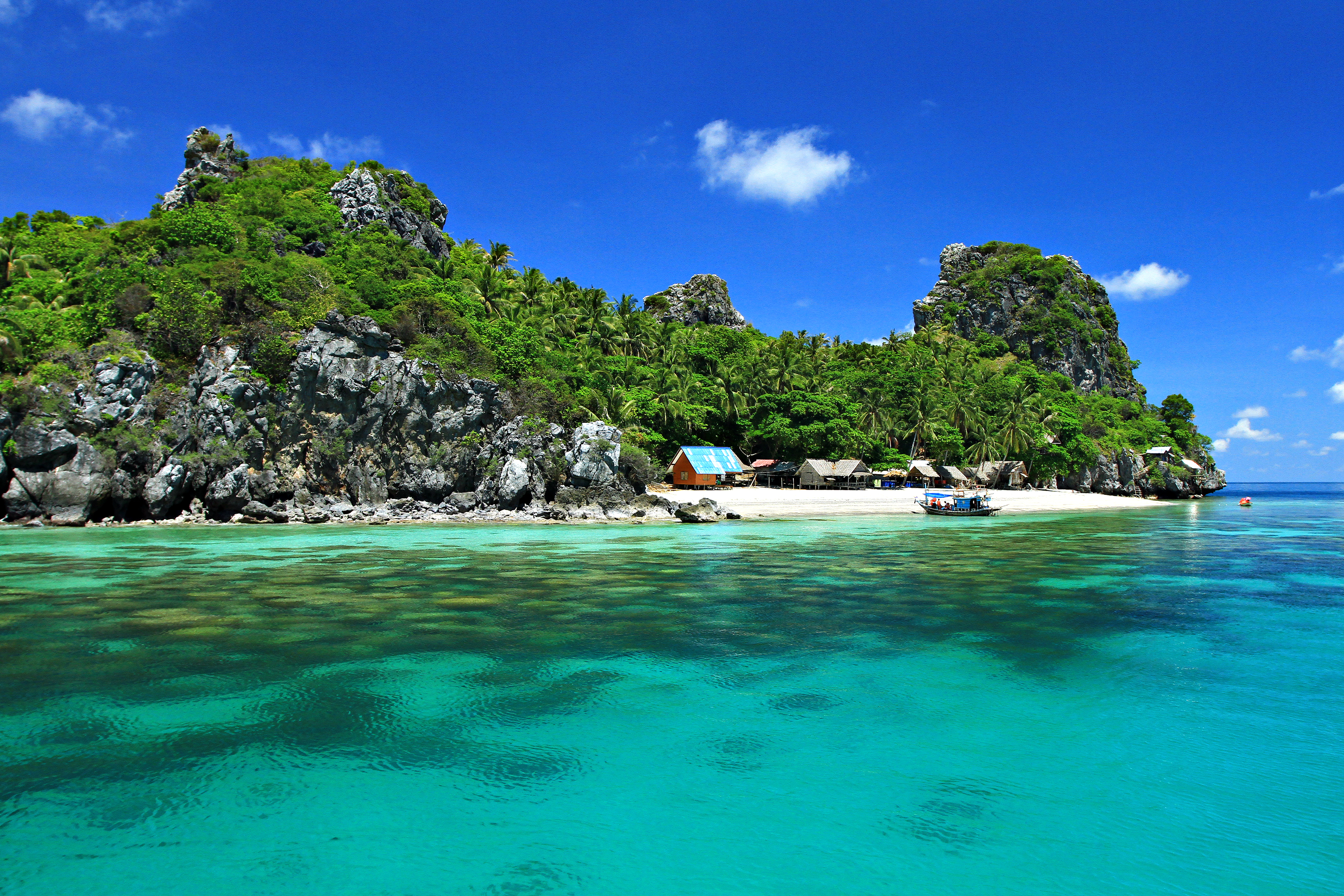
Mu Ko Chumphon National Park

== South (west coast: 20 national parks) ==
Name	Province	Area (km^{2})	Area (sq mi)	Order N.P.	DNP	Gazette date	Gazette source	PARO	Visitors
Hat Noppharat Thara– Mu Ko Phi Phi^{a}	Krabi	388	150	47		13-10-1998		5	1,142,113
Khao Phanom Bencha	Krabi	50	19	29		09-07-1981		5	17,307
Mu Ko Lanta^{a}	Krabi	134	52	62		15-08-1990		5	217,431
Than Bok Khorani^{a}	Krabi	104	40	85		30-09-1998		5	183,083
Ao Phang-nga^{a}	Phang Nga	400	150	25		29-04-1981		5	999,035
Khao Lak–Lam Ru^{a}	Phang Nga	125	48	66		30-08-1991		5	72,162
Khao Lampi– Hat Thai Mueang^{a}	Phang Nga	72	28	52		14-05-2010		5	50,496
Mu Ko Similan^{a}	Phang Nga	140	54	43		25-09-1998		5	676,793
Mu Ko Surin^{a}	Phang Nga	141	54	30		06-07-2007		5	54,171
Si Phang-nga	Phang Nga	246	95	56		16-04-1988		5	21,251
Sirinat^{a}	Phuket	90	35	32		13-07-1981		5	51,200
Laem Son^{a}	Ranong, Phang Nga	315	122	46		19-08-1983		4	28,258
Lam Nam Kra Buri^{a}	Ranong	160	62	91		21-04-1999		4	17,718
Mu Ko Ranong^{a}	Ranong	357	138	119		23-12-2009		4	482
Mu Ko Phetra^{a}	Satun, Trang	494	191	49		31-12-1984		5	129,851
Tarutao^{a}	Satun	1490	580	8		19-04-1974		5	238,409
Thale Ban^{a}	Satun	196	76	20		22-07-1991		5	11,996
Khao Sok	Surat Thani	739	285	22		02-08-1994		4	419,470
Khlong Phanom	Surat Thani	410	160	102		17-11-2000		4	1,711
Hat Chao Mai^{a}	Trang	231	89	36		13-09-1989		5	83,023

^{a} Marine parks

=== Not yet published in the Government Gazette (1 national park) ===
Name	Province	Area (km^{2})	Area (sq mi)	22 N.P. (preparation)	DNP	PARO	Visitors
Mu Ko Ra– Ko Phra Thong	Phang Nga	229	88	not listed		none	0

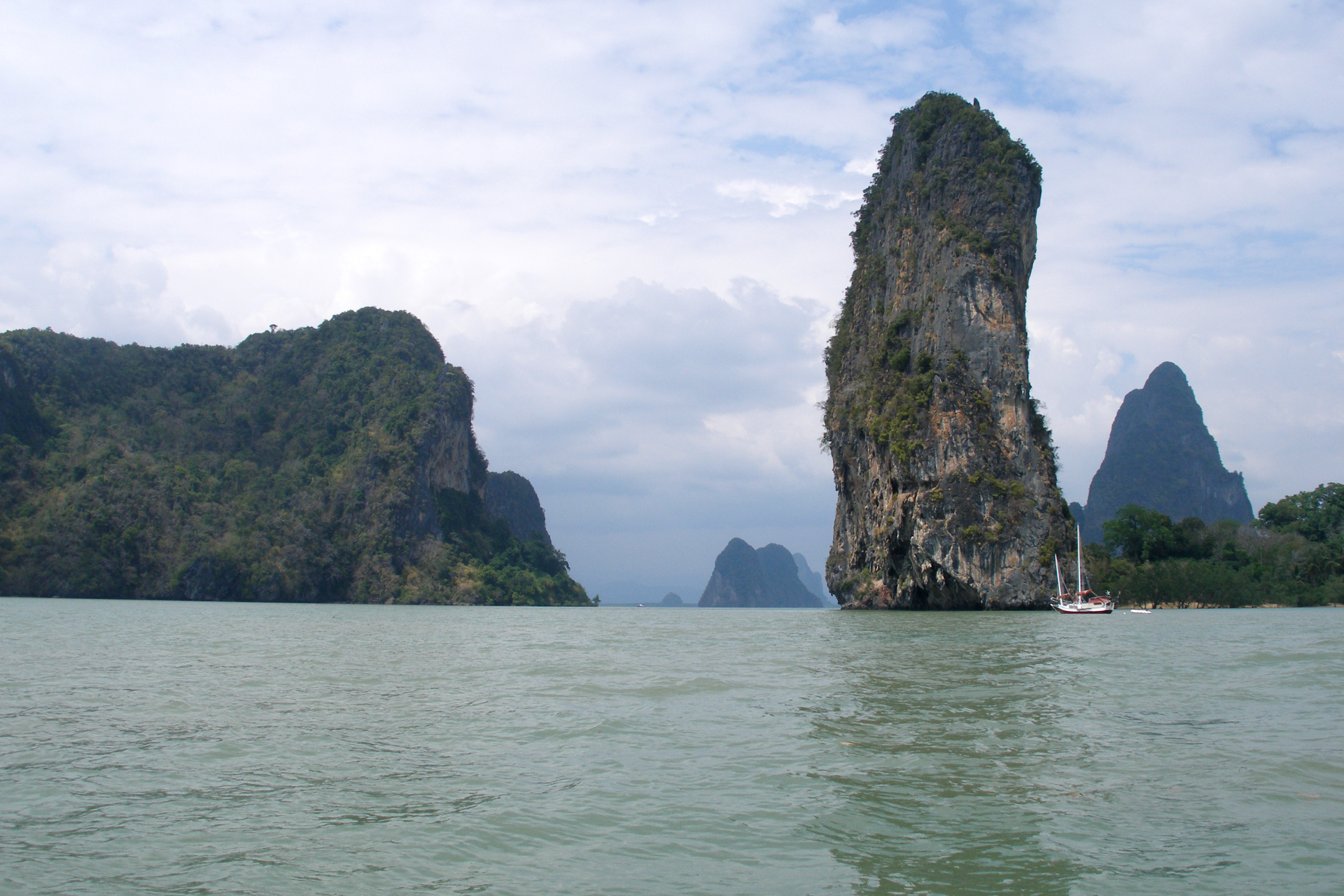
Karst formations in
Ao Phang Nga National Park

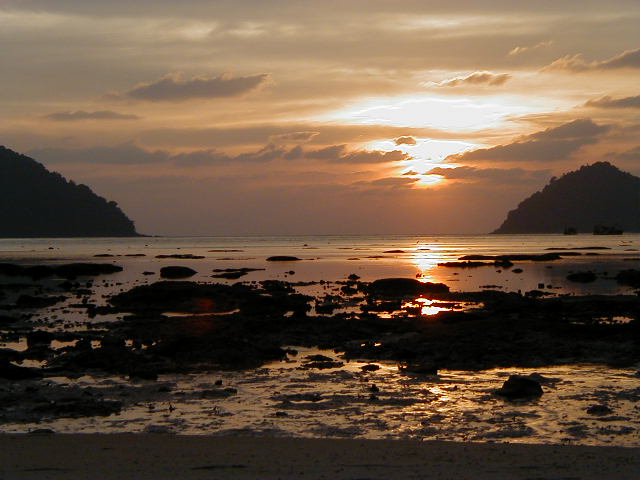
Mu Ko Surin National Marine Park

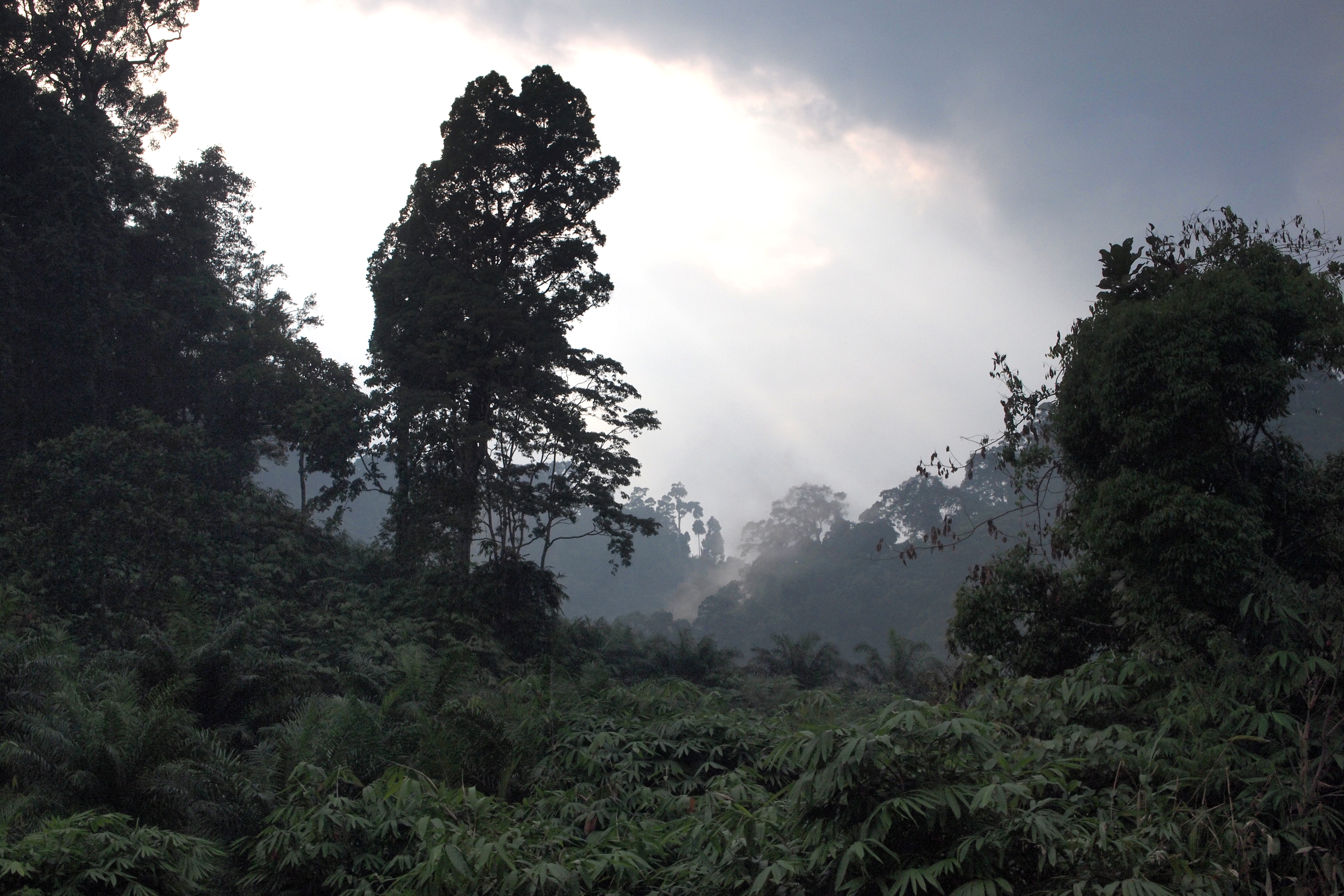
Tropical rainforest of
Khao Lak-Lam Ru National Park

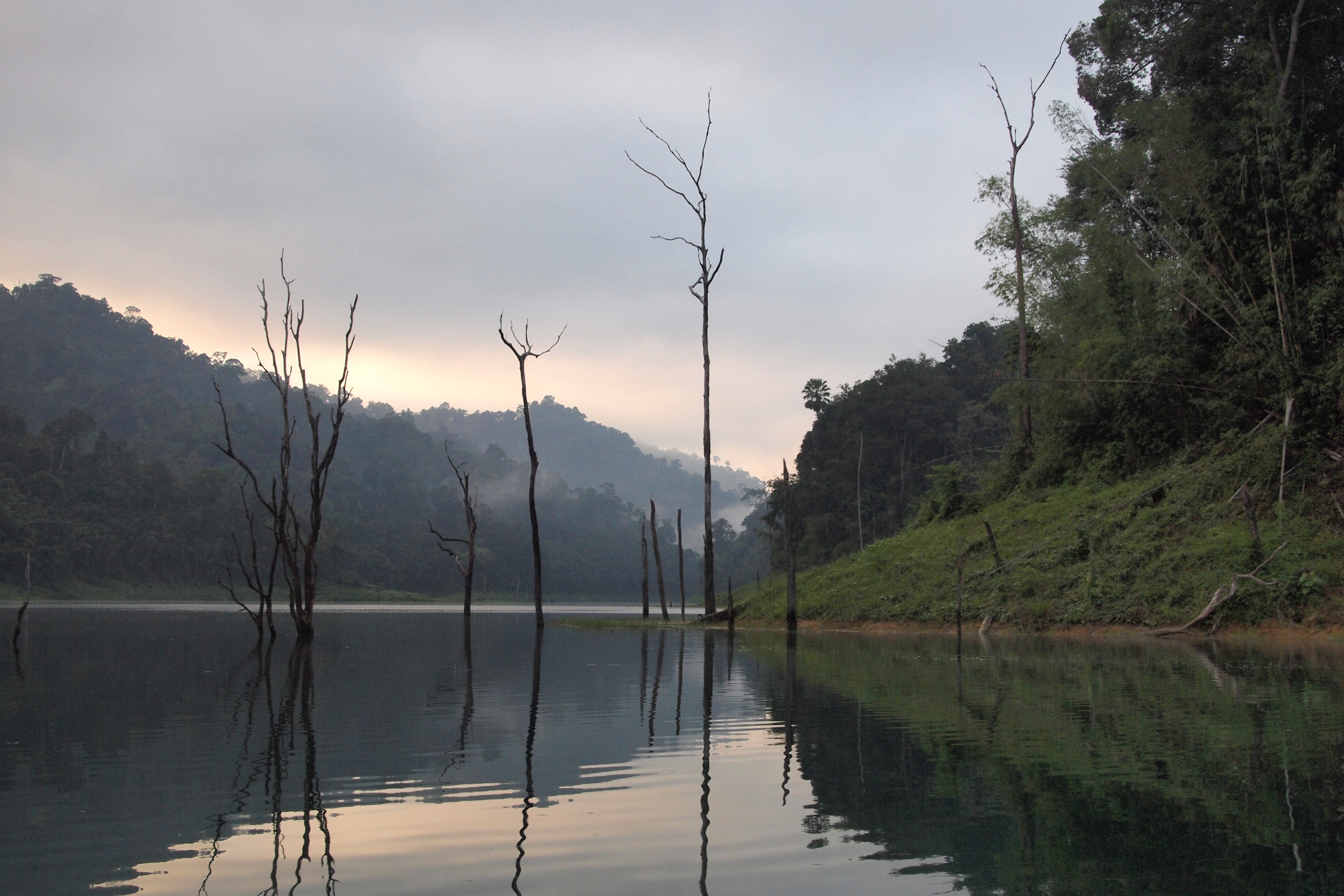
Cheow Lake in
Khao Sok National Park

== Changed names of national parks ==
Original name	Date	Changed name	Date	Province	PARO
Mae Fang	04-09-2000	Doi Pha Hom Pok	26-09-2008	Chiang Mai	16
Doi Suthep	14-04-1981	Doi Suthep–Pui	26-09-1982	Chiang Mai	16
Chiang Dao	02-11-2000	Pha Daeng	-03-2006	Chiang Mai	16
Mae Haad–Mae Ko	13-07-1981	Mae Ping	13-07-1981	Lamphun	16
Mae Pung	23-01-1984	Mae Yom		Phrae	13
Mai Klai Pen Hin		Doi Soi Malai	22-05-2018	Tak	14
Ton Krabak Yai	23-12-1981	Taksin Maharat	31-08-1986	Tak	14
Khlong Tron	04-12-2003	Ton Sak Yai	12-07-2012	Uttaradit	11
Na Haeo	23-11-1994	Phu Suan Sai	31-05-2006	Loei	8
Mukdahan	28-12-1988	Phu Pha Thoep	31-05-2006	Mukdahan	9
Huai Huad	28-07-1988	Phu Pha Yon	28-08-2000	Sakon Nakhon	10
Phu Phaya		Phu Hin Chom That– Phu Phra Bat		Udon Thani	10
Khao Sa Bap	02-05-1975	Namtok Phlio	29-09-1982	Chanthaburi	2
Tham Than Lot Mai	12-02-1980	Chaloem Rattanakosin	01-07-1982	Kanchanaburi	3
Khao Sam Lan	02-06-1981	Namtok Sam Lan	26-05-2017	Saraburi	1
Phra Phutthachai	31-05-2006	Namtok Sam Lan	26-05-2017	Saraburi	1
Nai Yang	13-07-1981	Sirinat	12-08-1992	Phuket	5

== Notes ==
- Area: the area of the national park according to the last publication in the Government Gazette
- Area: the area of the national park (preparation) according to the DNP list
- Order N.P.: according to first to last publication in the Government Gazette.
- DNP: more information and a map of the specific national park.
- Gazette date: the date of the last publication in the Government Gazette.
- Gazette source: the webpage with the pdf document of the publication in the Government Gazette.
- PARO: management of Thailand's national parks since 2002 in 16 regions with 5 branches.
- Visitors: visitor numbers to Thailand's national parks are for the 2019 fiscal year, which runs from October 1, 2018 to September 30, 2019.

== See also ==
- List of forest parks of Thailand
- List of protected areas of Thailand
- List of Ramsar wetlands of Thailand
- List of Protected Areas Regional Offices of Thailand
