= Namtok Sam Lan National Park =

National park in Thailand

- อุทยานแห่งชาติน้ำตกสามหลั่น
- IUCN category II (national park)
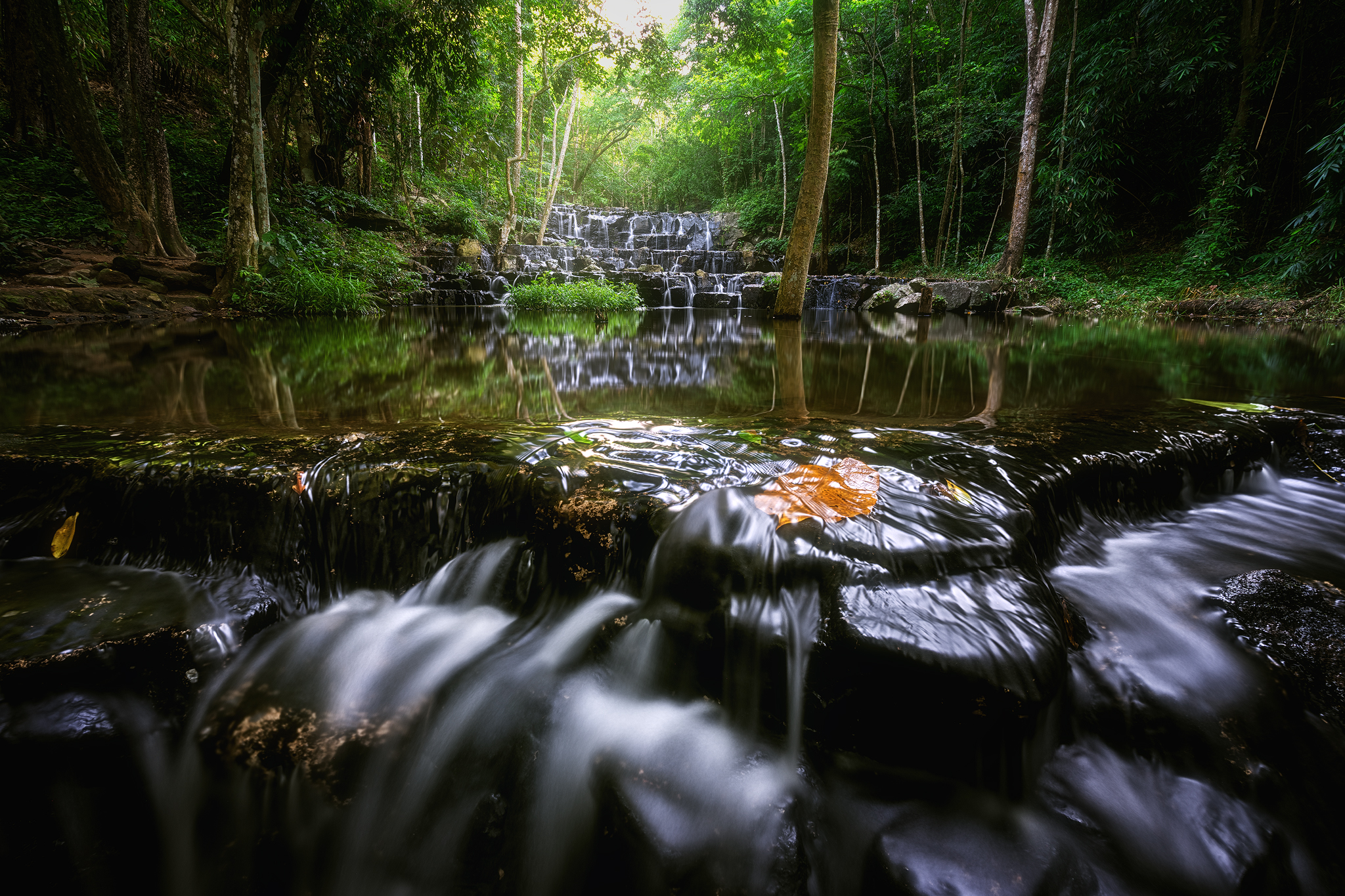
- Namtok Sam Lan Waterfall

- Location within Thailand
- Location: Saraburi Province, Thailand
- Nearest city: Saraburi
- Coordinates: 14°26′14″N 100°57′47″E
- Area: 45 km^{2} (17 sq mi)
- Established: June 1981
- Visitors: 45,828 (in 2019)
- Governing body: Department of National Parks, Wildlife and Plant Conservation

Namtok Sam Lan National Park (Thai: อุทยานแห่งชาติน้ำตกสามหลั่น) is a national park in Saraburi Province, Thailand. Other names for the park include Khao Sam Lan National Park and Phra Puttachai National Park. Home to waterfalls, reservoirs and forests, the park is located near the cave temple Wat Phra Puttachai.

== Geography ==
Namtok Sam Lan National Park is located about 6 kilometres (4 mi) south of Saraburi town. The park's area is 27,856 rai ~ 45 square kilometres (17 sq mi) encompassing parts of four districts: Kaeng Khoi District, Nong Khae District, Wihan Daeng District and Mueang District. The highest point is the viewpoint on Khao Khrok peak at 329 metres (1,079 ft).

== History ==
During World War II, the Japanese Army occupied and used this area as an encampment, entailing the destruction of some of the park's forests. In 1960 the Thai government began the restoration of this forest and designated it a conservation area. On 2 June 1981, Namtok Sam Lan was designated a National Park.

== Attractions ==
The park's best-known attractions are its waterfalls. The park's namesake Sam Lan Waterfall has three levels, each of about 5 metres (16 ft). Other waterfalls include Pho Hin Dat, Roi Kueak Ma and Ton Rak Sai.

== Flora and fauna ==
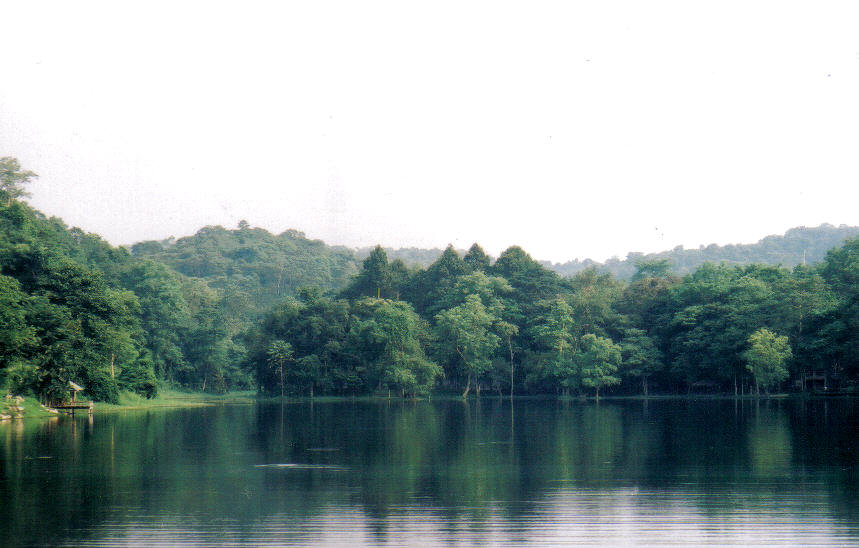
Near visitor centre

Namtok Sam Lan's forest consists of deciduous, mixed dipterocarp and evergreen forest. Tree species include teak (Tectona grandis), Pterocarpus macrocarpus, Afzelia xylocarpa, Hopea odorata, Dipterocarpus tuberculatus, Shorea obtusa, Xylia xylocarpa, Shorea siamensis and Lagerstroemia calyculata.

Animal species include pig-tailed macaque, northern red muntjac, lesser Oriental chevrotain, wild boar, Finlayson's squirrel and northern treeshrew. Birds include brown shrike, greater coucal, green-billed malkoha, Javan pond-heron, long-tailed shrike, Oriental magpie-robin, plain prinia, plaintive cuckoo, puff-throated babbler, red junglefowl, sooty-headed bulbul, streak-eared bulbul, western koel and white-rumped shama. Avian life is believed to have once included the white-eyed river martin, a native of northern Thailand now considered extinct. The park is also noted for its various butterfly species.

== Location ==
Namtok Sam Lan National Park in overview PARO 1 (Saraburi branch)

2) Namtok Sam Lan National Park in overview PARO 1 (Saraburi branch)

	National park
1	Namtok Chet Sao Noi
2	Namtok Sam Lan
	Wildlife sanctuary
3	Sap Langka

	Non-hunting area
4	Kaeng Khoi
5	Khao Erawan
6	Khao Somphot
7	Khao Wong Chan Daeng
8	Khuean Pasak Jolasid
9	Wat Phai Lom–Wat Amphu Wararam
10	Wat Tan En

	Botanical garden
11	Phu Kae

== See also ==
- List of national parks of Thailand
- List of Protected Areas Regional Offices of Thailand
