= List of World Heritage Sites in Thailand =

Location of World Heritage Sites in Thailand. Gold dots indicate cultural sites and green dots are natural. Numbers 1-5 mark the locations of Dong Phayayen–Khao Yai Forest Complex: 1. Khao Yai; 2. Thap Lan; 3. Pang Sida; 4. Dong Yai; 5. Ta Phraya; and numbers 6-9 mark the locations of Kaeng Krachan Forest Complex: 6. Chaloem Phrakiat Thai Prachan; 7. Mae Nam Phachi; 8. Kaeng Krachan; 9. Kui Buri.

The United Nations Educational, Scientific and Cultural Organization (UNESCO) designates World Heritage Sites of outstanding universal value to cultural or natural heritage which have been nominated by signatories to the 1972 UNESCO World Heritage Convention. Cultural heritage consists of monuments (such as architectural works, monumental sculptures, or inscriptions), groups of buildings, and sites (including archaeological sites). Natural heritage consists of natural features (physical and biological formations), geological and physiographical formations (including habitats of threatened species of animals and plants), and natural sites which are important from the point of view of science, conservation, or natural beauty. Thailand ratified the convention on 17 September 1987.

As of 2026, Thailand has nine sites on the list. The first three sites were listed in 1991: Historic Town of Sukhothai and Associated Historic Towns, Historic City of Ayutthaya, and Thungyai–Huai Kha Khaeng Wildlife Sanctuaries. The most recent site listed was Wat Phra Mahathat Woramahawihan, Nakhon Si Thammarat, in 2026. Six of Thailand's sites are cultural and three are natural. Thailand also has six sites on the tentative list.

== World Heritage Sites ==
UNESCO lists sites under ten criteria; each entry must meet at least one of the criteria. Criteria i through vi are cultural, and vii through x are natural.

World Heritage Sites
Site	Image	Location (province)	Year listed	UNESCO data	Description
Historic Town of Sukhothai and Associated Historic Towns	Large white seated Buddha statue, pond in front	Sukhothai, Kamphaeng Phet	1991	574; i, iii (cultural)	The site comprises three main cities from the Sukhothai Kingdom which flourished in the 13th and 14th centuries. Sukhothai (Wat Mahathat pictured) was the capital of the kingdom, Si Satchanalai was a centre of religious life, with several Buddhist monasteries, and Kamphaeng Phet protected the borders and the kingdom's trade networks. The three cities shared town planning approaches and sophisticated water management systems. They were important in the development of the first distinct Siamese architectural style, literature, arts, and religious practices. The remains of the cities are now preserved as archaeological parks.
Historic City of Ayutthaya	Ruins of stupas of various sizes	Phra Nakhon Si Ayutthaya	1991	576; iii (cultural)	The city of Ayutthaya was founded in 1350 and served as the capital of the Ayutthaya Kingdom, or Siam. It was a globally important city, a commercial centre with diplomatic connections in India, China, Japan, as well as in Europe. Exchange of cultural influences resulted in development of Thai national art, with richly decorated palaces and Buddhist monasteries. Ayutthaya was razed by the Burmese army in 1767 and it was never rebuilt. The capital moved to Bangkok and Ayutthaya is now preserved as an archaeological park. The ruins of Wat Chaiwatthanaram are pictured.
Thungyai–Huai Kha Khaeng Wildlife Sanctuaries	A river flowing through a forested mountain landscape	Kanchanaburi, Tak, Uthai Thani	1991	591; vii, ix, x (natural)	The site comprises two wildlife sanctuaries, Thung Yai Naresuan (pictured) and Huai Kha Khaeng. The sanctuaries, which stretch over more than 600,000 ha (1,500,000 acres) along the border with Myanmar, comprise a plethora of different habitats, including dry tropical forests, wetlands, limestone habitats, and mountains. It is also an area of high animal and plant biodiversity, representing species from Sino-Himalayan, Sundaic, Indo-Burmese, and Indo-Chinese regions. The forests are largely undisturbed by human influences.
Ban Chiang Archaeological Site	Vase with red and white design	Udon Thani	1992	575; iii (cultural)	Ban Chiang is one of the most important prehistoric sites in Southeast Asia. It is a large earthen mound that was continuously occupied by a settled agricultural society between about 1500 BCE to 900 BCE. Discovered by archaeologists in 1966, the excavations uncovered large numbers of ceramic artifacts (museum exhibit pictured), as well as tools related to bronze-working, animal domestication, and wet rice agriculture.
Dong Phayayen–Khao Yai Forest Complex	Medium-sized waterfall in a tropical forest	Saraburi, Nakhon Ratchasima, Nakhon Nayok, Prachinburi, Sa Kaeo, Buriram	2005	590; x (natural)	The site comprises five protected areas in the Dong Phaya Yen Mountains and Sankamphaeng Range, namely Khao Yai (pictured), Thap Lan, Pang Sida and Ta Phraya National Parks, and Dong Yai Wildlife Sanctuary. Tropical forests are home to numerous animal and plant species, several of them endangered. Mammal species include the pileated gibbon, Asian elephant, tiger, leopard cat, and banteng.
Kaeng Krachan Forest Complex	Clouded mountain scenery	Ratchaburi, Phetchaburi, Prachuap Khiri Khan	2021	1461; x (natural)	The site comprises forests and wildlife reserves in the Tenasserim Hills: Kaeng Krachan, Kui Buri, and Chaloem Phrakiat Thai Prachan national parks, and the Mae Nam Phachi Wildlife Sanctuary. Due to its location at the junction of the Himalayan, Indochina, and Sumatran faunal and floral realms, it is a biodiversity hotspot. Seasonal tropical forests are home to vulnerable and endangered species, including the dhole, Siamese crocodile, Asian forest tortoise, fishing cat, and clouded leopard.
The Ancient Town of Si Thep and its Associated Dvaravati Monuments	Ancient ruins in a forest	Phetchabun	2023	1662; ii, iii (cultural)	Si Thep was an important city of the Dvaravati culture (7th to 11th century CE), it was a commercial and religious centre. It next came under the Khmer influence and was ultimately abandoned by the late 13th century. Arts and architecture of Si Thep were influenced by Theravada Buddhism during the Dvaravati period and by Hinduism and Mahayana Buddhism under the Khmer.
Phu Phrabat, a testimony to the Sīma stone tradition of the Dvaravati period	A rock formation with some masonry visible	Udon Thani	2024	1507; iii, v (cultural)	The large sandstone rock formations in the area have inspired peoples throughout the centuries to build religious sites around them. Early shrines date to the Dvaravati period (dating between the 7th and 11th centuries). Shrines feature Hindu and Buddhist influences. There are also rock paintings dating to prehistoric times. The name Phuphrabat translates to the "Hill of Buddha's Footprints".
Wat Phra Mahathat Woramahawihan, Nakhon Si Thammarat	A Buddhist temple with a large white stupa	Nakhon Si Thammarat	2026	1761; ii, vi (cultural)	Wat Phra Mahathat Woramahawihan is the main Buddhist temple (wat) of Nakhon Si Thammarat Province in southern Thailand, a crucial trade crossroad between the Indian and Pacific Oceans. Founded in the 8th century, where a Hindu shrine once stood around 5th–8th centuries, the monastery has been a regional religious centre ever since. The main stupa of the temple, Phra Borommathat Chedi ('great noble relics stupa'), was built by King Sri Dhammasokaraja in the early-13th century to establish a symbol for the Theravada Buddhism sect in the region. The temple houses a relic of Gautama Buddha. The religious and local traditions have continued at the monastery for more than 1,500 years, including the Nakhon Si Thammarat chronicle tradition, the annual cloth-wrapping ceremony for the Great Reliquary and the Menora dance drama.

== Tentative list ==
In addition to sites inscribed on the World Heritage List, member states can maintain a list of tentative sites that they may consider for nomination. Nominations for the World Heritage List are only accepted if the site was previously listed on the tentative list. As of 2026, Thailand lists six properties on its tentative list.

Tentative sites
Site	Image	Location (province)	Year listed	UNESCO criteria	Description
Monuments, Sites and Cultural Landscape of Chiang Mai, Capital of Lanna	A Buddhist temple at night	Chiang Mai	2015	i, ii, iii, vi (cultural)	Chiang Mai was founded in 1296 as a capital of the Lanna Kingdom. Even though the area was taken over by the Burmese Toungoo dynasty in the 16th century and incorporated into Thailand in the 20th century, people of the Lanna civilization still preserve their cultural practices. The nomination covers the city of Chiang Mai and the surrounding area that prominently features numerous Buddhist temples.
Phra That Phanom, its related historic buildings and associated landscape	A Buddhist temple on the other side of a road	Nakhon Phanom	2017	i, ii, vi (cultural)	Wat Phra That Phanom is an ancient and most important Buddhist temple in the Mekong river valley. According to a local legend, the temple was founded shortly after Buddha's nirvana and is believed to house Buddha's relics. Archaeological excavations have found the earliest structures dating to the 7th or 8th century CE. The architectural style blends influences from India with those of Khmer and Cham civilizations. A renovation of the temple took place in the 1970s.
Ensemble of Phanom Rung, Muang Tam and Plai Bat Sanctuaries	A Hindu temple in stone	Buriram	2019	iii, iv, v (cultural)	Phanom Rung is a Hindu temple complex constructed by the Khmer Empire between the 10th and 13th century. It is located on the rim of an extinct volcano overlooking the surrounding plains. It is dedicated to Shiva and is decorated with sculptures and stone carvings depicting scenes from the Ramayana and Mahabharata epics. In the plains, the remains of the water management system from the 15th to 18th century have been preserved.
The Andaman Sea Nature Reserves of Thailand	Stones at a beach	Ranong, Phang-nga, Phuket	2021	vii, ix, x (natural)	This nomination covers six national parks and a mangrove conservation area along Thailand's Andaman Sea coast. The coast contains different types of ecosystems. In addition to mangrove forests, there are also tropical evergreen forests, karst mountains, sandy beeches, seagrass beds, coral reefs, and open sea habitats. Located at the meeting point of Indo-Chinese, Indo-Himalayan, and Sundic regions, the area is exceptionally high in biodiversity. Laem Son National Park is pictured.
Songkhla and its Associated Lagoon Settlements	Lake shore with trees partially obscuring a building	Songkhla	2024	ii, iv, v (cultural)	Songkhla Lake is a large brackish lagoon, the coasts of which have been inhabited for millennia. As the inner mouth of the lagoon offered a safe harbour to the trade ships traveling between China and the Indian subcontinent, numerous settlements developed into important port towns. The nomination comprises the ancient towns of Phang Yang, Pha Kho, Si Yang, and Sathing Phra, which flourished between the 7th and 10th centuries, fortified settlements of Singora at Khao Daeng and Laem Son from the 17th century, and Songkhla Old Town at Bo Yang from the mid-19th century. The settlements illustrate the interaction of different cultures and religions, with influences from China, India, Java and Malay.
Phra Prang of Wat Arun Ratchawararam: The Masterpiece of Krung Rattanakosin	A Buddhist temple with a large pagoda	Bangkok	2025	i, ii (cultural)	The Buddhist temple was founded during the Ayutthaya period but the current structure was constructed in the mid-19th century. The characteristic feature of the temple is its central spire, prang, which is the tallest prang in Thailand and presents an architectural departure from the previous styles. The temple is decorated with glazed porcelain.

== See also ==
- Tourism in Thailand
- History of Thailand
- List of Intangible Cultural Heritage elements in Thailand
