= Blackwood =

Blackwood or Blackwoods may refer to:

== Botany ==
- African blackwood (Dalbergia melanoxylon), a timber tree of Africa
- African blackwood (Erythrophleum africanum), (Peltophorum africanum) also Rhodesian blackwood, trees from Africa
- Australian blackwood (Senegalia modesta Syn.: Acacia modesta), a tree from India, Pakistan, Nepal and Himalaya
- Australian blackwood (Diospyros longibracteata), from Laos
- Australian or Tasmanian, Paluma blackwood (Acacia melanoxylon), a tree of eastern Australia
- Bombay, Malabar, Nilghiri or (East) Indian blackwood (Dalbergia latifolia), a timber tree of India
- Burmese Blackwood (Dalbergia cultrata, Dalbergia oliveri), trees from South China, Southeast Asia
- Cape blackwood (Diospyros whyteana), Southern East and South Africa, (Maytenus peduncularis), from South Africa
- Chinese blackwood, East African blackwood (Dalbergia melanoxylon), from Africa, India
- Indian blackwood (Hardwickia binata), from India
- Malabar blackwood (Dalbergia sissoides), from India, Indonesia
- Acacia argyrodendron, a tree from Australia
- Acacia penninervis, a small tree or shrub of Australia
- Avicennia germinans, from Middle America to Northern South America, South United States, Africa
- Diospyros melanoxylon, from India
- Haematoxylum campechianum, from Central America

== Entertainment ==
=== Film ===
- Blackwood (1976 film) - a 1976 Canadian documentary film
- Blackwood (2013 film)
- Blackwoods (film) - a 2002 psychological thriller film

=== Magazines ===
- Blackwood's Magazine - a British periodical printed between 1817 and 1980

=== Card Games ===
- Blackwood convention - a bidding agreement in contract bridge

=== Video Games ===
- Blackwood - main antagonists of the 2013 Crytek multiplayer-based first-person shooter game Warface.

=== Music ===
- The Blackwood Brothers - a southern gospel music quartet

== Places ==
=== Australia ===
- Blackwood, South Australia, a suburb of Adelaide
- Blackwood, Victoria.

=== United Kingdom ===
- Blackwood, Caerphilly, Wales
- Blackwood, Cumbernauld, North Lanarkshire, Scotland
- Blackwood, South Lanarkshire, Scotland.

=== United States ===
- Blackwood, Georgia
- Blackwood, New Jersey
- Blackwood, North Carolina
- Blackwood, Virginia.

== Other ==
- Blackwood (surname), a Scottish surname
- Blackwood (publishing house)
- Blackwoods Gin, a Scottish brand of gin
- Blackwood Homestead, a historic homestead in Victoria, Australia
- Blackwood National Park, in Charters Towers Region, Queensland, Australia
- Blackwood River, in Western Australia
- Blackwood-class frigate, a class of British warship
- HMS Blackwood, one of three British ships
- Lincoln Blackwood, an American luxury pickup truck manufactured by Lincoln
- Blackwood Gallery, a contemporary art centre at the University of Toronto Mississauga

== See also ==
- Black wood of grapevine, a bacterial disease
