= Blackwood (surname) =

Origin
- Language: English
- Meaning: Black-wood
- Region of origin: Scotland (Lanarkshire)

Other names
- Variant forms: Blakwode, Blackwud, Blakewood, Blaikwood

Blackwood is a locational surname of Scottish origin meaning "black wood". Spelling variations include: Blackwood, Blackwode, Blakewood, Blaikwood, Blacud and many more. First found in Ayrshire, but one of the first recorded to the family name was William de Blackwood in 1327 in Stirlingshire.

Some of the first settlers of this name or some of its variants were: the Blackwoods who settled in Bonavista, Newfoundland in the early 19th century and others.

== Peerage of the United Kingdom ==
- Basil Hamilton-Temple-Blackwood, 4th Marquess of Dufferin and Ava (1909–1945), British politician and soldier; only son of the 3rd Marquess of Dufferin and Ava
- Frederick Hamilton-Temple-Blackwood, 1st Marquess of Dufferin and Ava (1826–1902), British public servant
- Frederick Hamilton-Temple-Blackwood, 3rd Marquess of Dufferin and Ava (1875–1930), British soldier and politician; fourth son of the 1st Marquess of Dufferin and Ava
- Hariot Hamilton-Temple-Blackwood, Marchioness of Dufferin and Ava (1843–1936), British peeress who led an initiative to improve medical care for women in British India
- Sheridan Hamilton-Temple-Blackwood, 5th Marquess of Dufferin and Ava (1938–1988), British patron of the arts
- Terence Hamilton-Temple-Blackwood, 2nd Marquess of Dufferin and Ava (1866–1918), British diplomat; second son of the 1st Marquess of Dufferin and Ava

== Scottish clans ==
- Blackwood Sept, sub-family of the Clan Douglas of Scotland.

== Others ==
- Adam Blackwood (1539–1613), Scottish author and apologist for Mary, Queen of Scots
- Algernon Blackwood (1869–1951), British writer of ghost stories
- Beatrice Blackwood (1889–1975), British anthropologist
- Lady Caroline Blackwood (1931–1996), English writer and artist's muse; eldest child of Basil Hamilton-Temple-Blackwood, 4th Marquess of Dufferin and Ava
- J. Curtis Blackwood Jr. (born 1956), American politician
- David Lloyd Blackwood (1941–2022), Canadian artist
- Easley Blackwood Jr. (1933–2023), American composer, professor of music and author; son of Easley Blackwood Sr.
- Easley Blackwood Sr. (1903–1992), American, contract bridge player and originator of the Blackwood convention; father of Easley Blackwood Jr.
- Eric Blackwood (1921–2007), Canadian aviator
- Freya Blackwood (born 1975), Australian illustrator and special effects artist
- Gary Blackwood (author) (born 1945), American author
- Gary Blackwood (politician), Australian politician
- Grant Blackwood, American author
- Henry Blackwood (1770–1832), British Royal Navy Vice-Admiral
- Ibra Charles Blackwood (1878–1936), American politician
- James Blackwood (1919–2002), American gospel singer with The Blackwood Brothers
- James Blackwood, 2nd Baron Dufferin and Claneboye (1755–1836), Irish politician
- Jermaine Blackwood, a Jamaican and West Indies cricketer, born 1991
- John Blackwood (disambiguation), several persons
- Kevin Blackwood, professional blackjack player, card counter and gambling author
- Mackenzie Blackwood (born 1996), Canadian ice hockey goaltender
- Margaret Blackwood (1909–1986), Australian botanist
- Michael Blackwood (disambiguation), several persons
- Nina Blackwood (born 1955), American disc jockey and music journalist
- Richard Blackwood (born 1972), British comedian and media personality
- Ronald Blackwood (1926–2017), Jamaican-American politician
- Ryan Blackwood (born 1985), Caymanian chess player
- Vas Blackwood (born 1961), British television and film actor
- William Blackwood (1776–1834), Scottish publisher

== Fictional characters ==
- Charlotte "Charlie" Blackwood played by Kelly McGillis in the 1986 film Top Gun
- Lord Henry Blackwood, the antagonist in the 2009 film Sherlock Holmes
- Constance Blackwood, a character in Ride the Cyclone
- Martin Blackwood, a character in The Magnus Archives
- Faustus Blackwood, a character in Chilling Adventures of Sabrina
- Mary Katherine Blackwood and family in We Have Always Lived in the Castle
