= Burmese rosewood =

Burmese rosewood is a common name for several plants and may refer to:

- Dalbergia oliveri
- Dalbergia bariensis
- Pterocarpus indicus
