= Dong Phayayen–Khao Yai Forest Complex =

UNESCO World Heritage Site
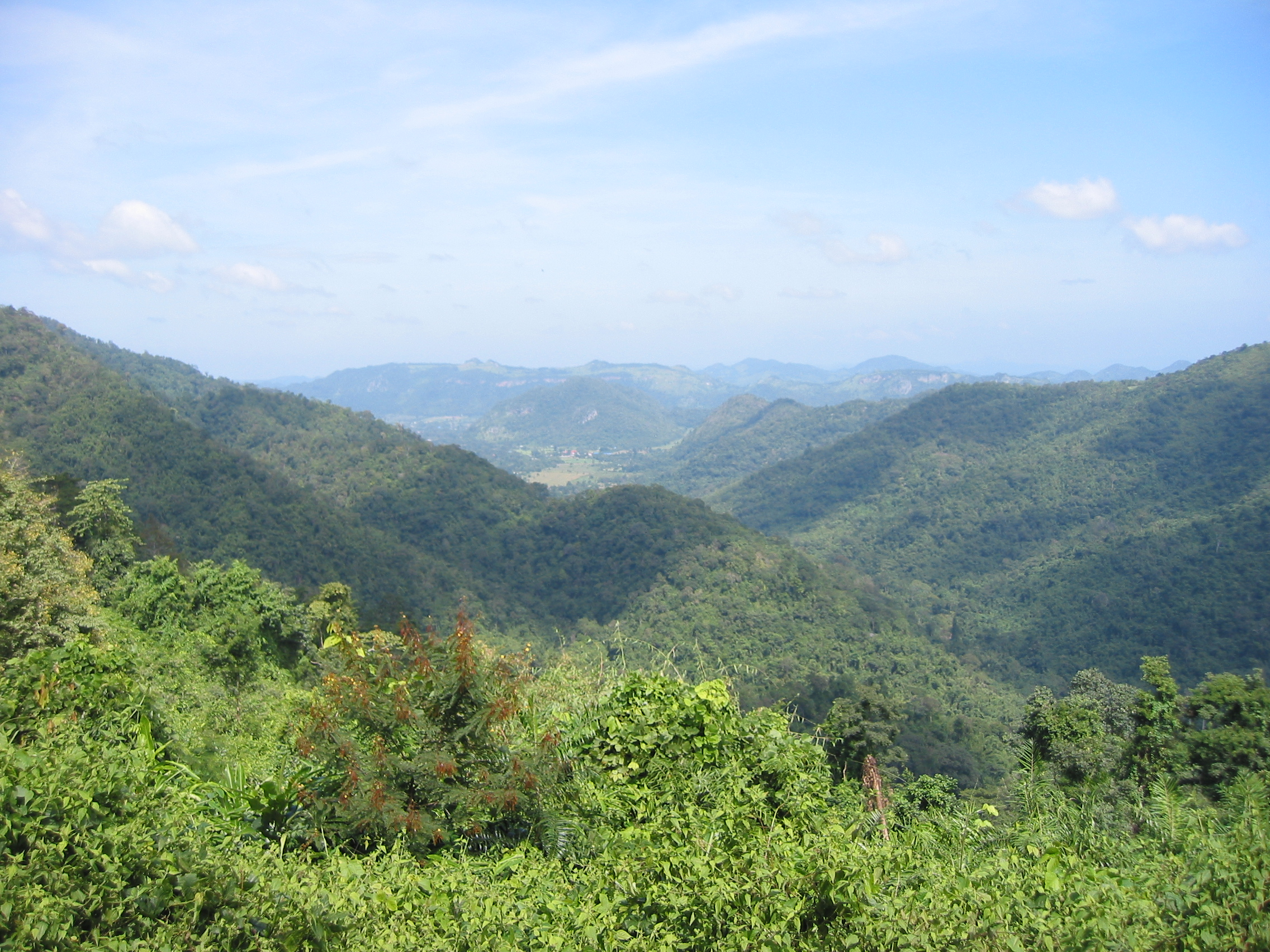
- View in Khao Yai National Park

- Location within Thailand
- Location: Thailand
- Criteria: Natural: (x)
- Reference: 590
- Inscription: 2005 (29th Session)
- Area: 615,500 ha (1,521,000 acres)
- Coordinates: 14°19′48″N 102°3′0″E

Dong Phayayen–Khao Yai Forest Complex is a UNESCO World Heritage Site in Thailand. It covers the areas of five protected areas in the Dong Phaya Yen Mountains and Sankamphaeng Range, namely Khao Yai, Thap Lan, Pang Sida and Ta Phraya National Parks, and Dong Yai Wildlife Sanctuary. The property was inscribed on the World Heritage list in 2005.

The Dong Phayayen–Khao Yai Forest Complex spans 230 kilometres (140 mi) between Ta Phraya National Park on the Cambodian border in the east, and Khao Yai National Park in the west. The site is home to more than 800 species of fauna, including 112 mammal species (among them two species of gibbon), 392 bird species and 200 reptile and amphibian species. It is internationally important for the conservation of globally threatened and endangered mammal, bird and reptile species, among them 19 that are vulnerable, four that are endangered, and one that is critically endangered. The area contains substantial and important tropical forest ecosystems, which can provide a viable habitat for the long-term survival of these species.

Still, continued illegal Siamese rosewood logging and ongoing road expansion risking encroachment within the reserve saw the World Heritage Committee warn of a potential downgrading of the complex to the “World Heritage in Danger List”. At its 41st session in July 2017, the Committee commended Thailand for its efforts in ceasing the illegal logging and trade of Siamese rosewood, but noted several infrastructure projects that could negatively impact the site were still being considered. While the site remains on the World Heritage list, the Committee intends to reexamine the state's conservation efforts at its 44th session in 2020.

In March 2017, the world's second known breeding population of Indochinese tigers was confirmed within the reserve.

== Location ==
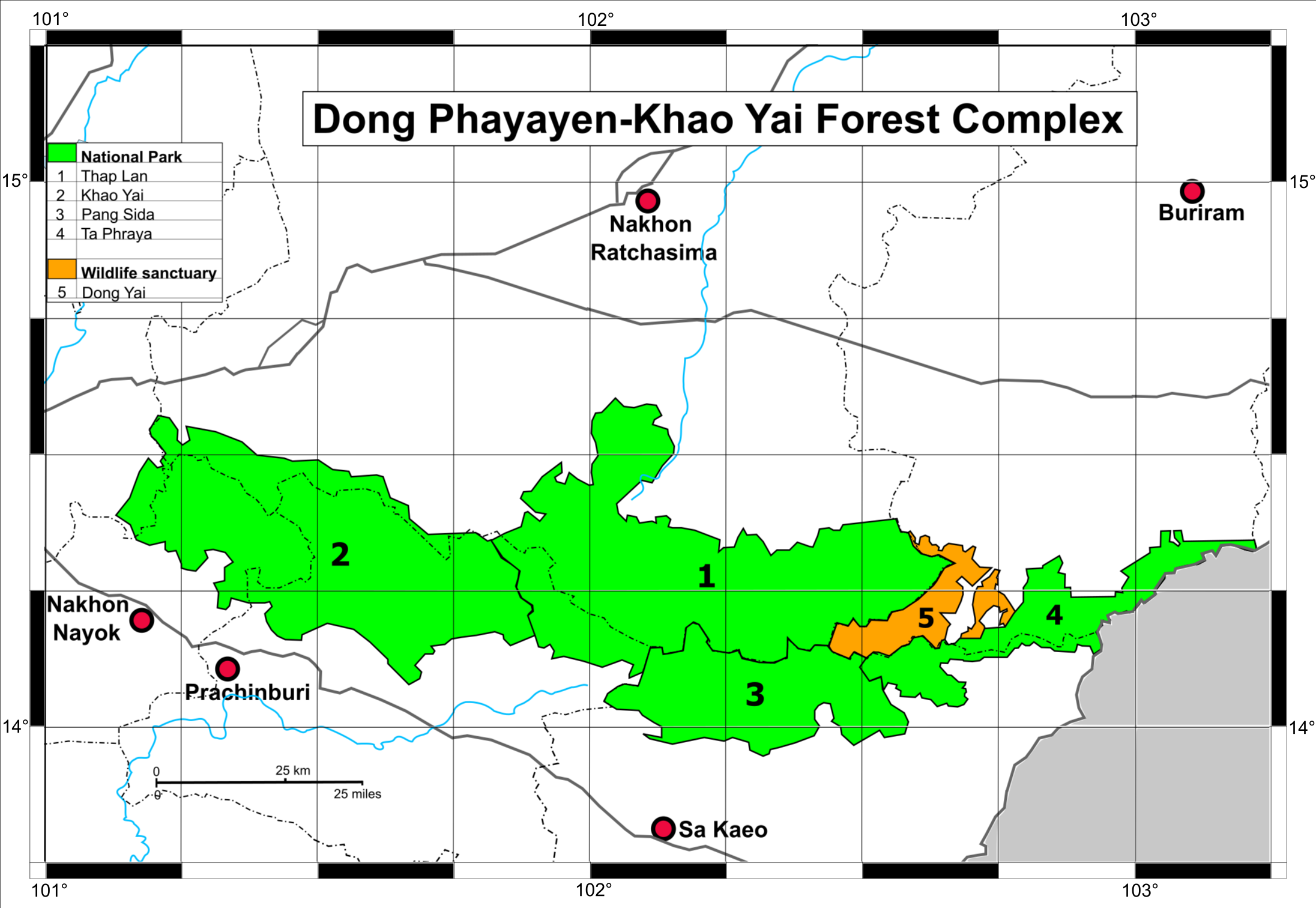
Dong Phayayen-Khao Yai Forest Complex

	National park
1	Thap Lan
2	Khao Yai
3	Pang Sida
4	Ta Phraya

	Wildlife sanctuary
5	Dong Yai
