= Khao Rom =

Mountain in Thailand

- เขาร่ม
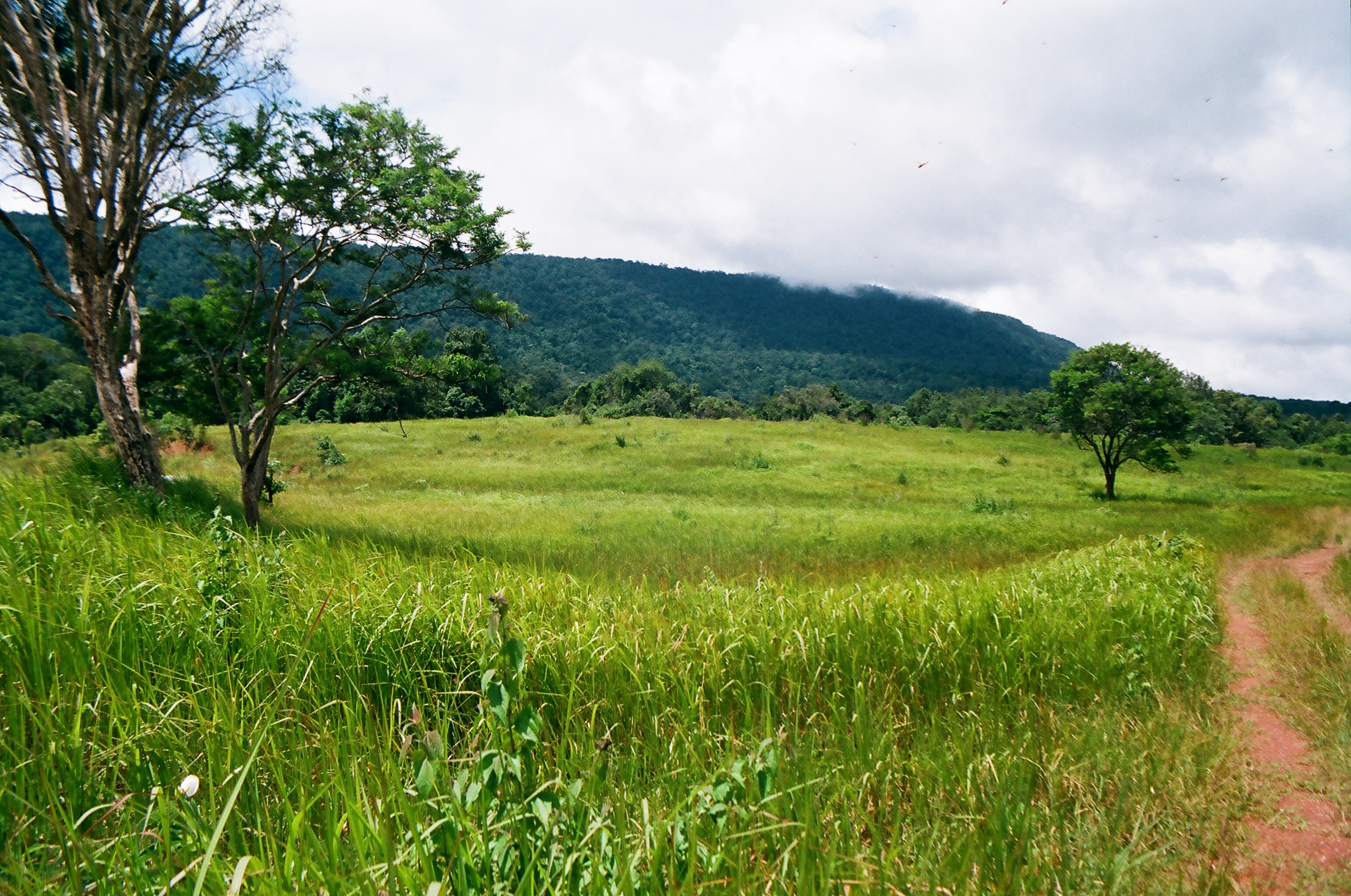
- Khao Rom. Meadow close to the summit

Highest point
- Elevation: 1,351 m (4,432 ft)
- Prominence: 1,061 m (3,481 ft)
- Listing: Ribu; List of mountains in Thailand
- Coordinates: 14°21′21″N 101°22′37″E

Geography
- Location within Thailand
- Location: Thailand
- Parent range: Sankamphaeng Range

Geology
- Mountain type: Sandstone

Climbing
- First ascent: unknown
- Easiest route: hike or drive up the road leading to the radar station

Khao Rom (Thai: เขาร่ม) is a 1,351-metre-high (4,432 ft) mountain in Nakhon Ratchasima Province, Thailand. It is the highest peak of the Sankamphaeng Range, between eastern Thailand and Isan.

== History ==
Khao Rom is also known as Khao Khiao (เขาเขียว), also spelt Khao Khieo, and was known as "Green Hill" during the Vietnam War. At that time there was a US military Air Defense Radar Station of the 621 TCS Tactical Control Squadron, Khao Khieo RTAB TH "Dressy Lady", at the top of the mountain which is roughly midway between Bangkok and Korat. This peak should not be confused with other mountains in Thailand having the name Khao Khiao, including one in the same range.

== Hiking ==
This mountain is surrounded by forests and, like a great portion of the Sankamphaeng Range, it is part of the Khao Yai National Park area. The former US radar station is now run by the Royal Thai Armed Forces and is guarded by the military. Although the highest point of the mountain is not accessible to the public, there is a viewpoint near the entrance with beautiful views over the surrounding landscape on clear days.

Land leeches are common in the bushy undergrowth and under the leaves of low branches close to narrow forest paths.

== Climate ==
Climate data for Khao Khieo Meteorological Station, elevation 1,292 m (4,239 ft), (1993–2022)
Month	Jan	Feb	Mar	Apr	May	Jun	Jul	Aug	Sep	Oct	Nov	Dec	Year
Mean daily maximum °C (°F)	23.3 (73.9)	24.2 (75.6)	25.6 (78.1)	25.9 (78.6)	25.4 (77.7)	24.2 (75.6)	23.5 (74.3)	23.1 (73.6)	23.5 (74.3)	23.7 (74.7)	23.7 (74.7)	22.5 (72.5)	24.0 (75.3)
Daily mean °C (°F)	18.7 (65.7)	19.8 (67.6)	21.5 (70.7)	21.3 (70.3)	21.7 (71.1)	21.1 (70.0)	20.7 (69.3)	20.3 (68.5)	20.3 (68.5)	19.8 (67.6)	19.6 (67.3)	17.8 (64.0)	20.2 (68.4)
Mean daily minimum °C (°F)	15.4 (59.7)	16.0 (60.8)	18.0 (64.4)	18.5 (65.3)	19.0 (66.2)	18.6 (65.5)	18.3 (64.9)	18.4 (65.1)	18.3 (64.9)	17.7 (63.9)	16.8 (62.2)	14.7 (58.5)	17.5 (63.5)
Average precipitation mm (inches)	32.9 (1.30)	66.0 (2.60)	80.2 (3.16)	144.6 (5.69)	305.3 (12.02)	467.8 (18.42)	529.3 (20.84)	848.4 (33.40)	582.7 (22.94)	343.9 (13.54)	41.6 (1.64)	20.6 (0.81)	3,463.3 (136.36)
Average relative humidity (%)	77	76	85	87	91	94	95	96	95	91	85	80	88
Source: Soil Resources Survey and Research Division

== See also ==
- Khao Yai National Park
- List of mountains in Thailand
