= HMS Blackwood =

Three ships of the Royal Navy have borne the name HMS Blackwood, after Vice-Admiral Sir Henry Blackwood:

- HMS Blackwood was to have been a Captain-class frigate. She was launched in 1942 for the Royal Navy, but was retained by the US Navy as USS Austin.
- HMS Blackwood (K313) was a Captain-class frigate launched in 1942 and transferred to the Royal Navy under Lend-Lease. She was sunk in 1944.
- HMS Blackwood (F78) was a Blackwood-class frigate launched in 1955 and broken up in 1976.
