= Khao Yai National Park =

National park in Thailand

- Thai: อุทยานแห่งชาติเขาใหญ่, RTGS: Utthayan Haeng Chat Khao Yai, pronounced [ʔùt.tʰā.jāːn hɛ̀ŋ tɕʰâːt kʰǎw jàj]; Northeastern Thai: อุทยานแห่งชาติเขาใหญ่, pronounced [ʔǔt.tʰā.ɲâːn hɛ̄ŋ sâːt kʰǎw ɲāj]
- IUCN category II (national park)
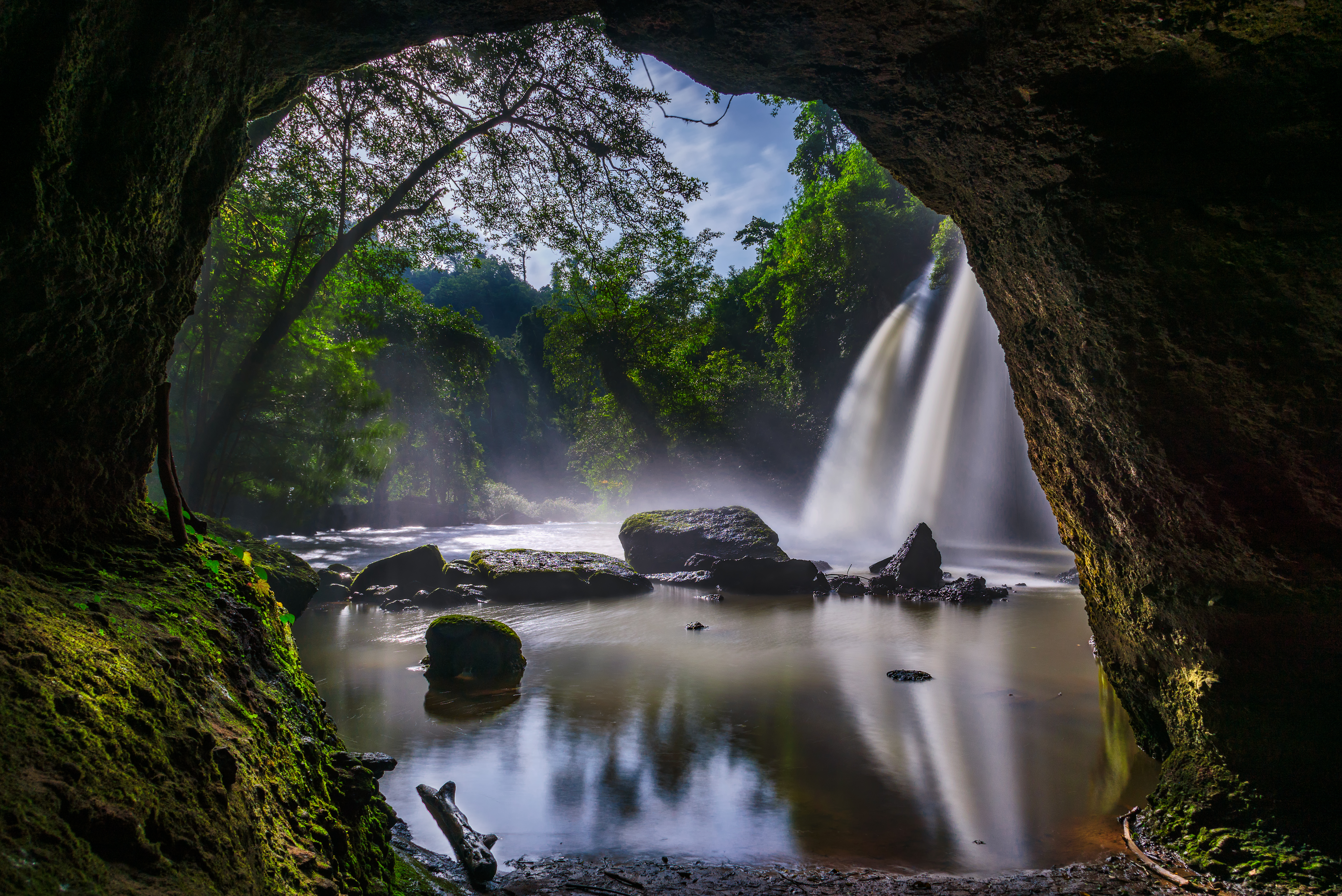
- Haew Suwat waterfall
- Interactive map of Khao Yai National Park
- Location: Nakhon Ratchasima, Thailand
- Nearest city: Pak Chong District
- Coordinates: 14.35°N 101.44°E
- Area: 2,166 km^{2} (836 sq mi)
- Established: 18 September 1962
- Visitors: 1,551,449 (in 2019)
- Governing body: Department of National Parks, Wildlife and Plant Conservation

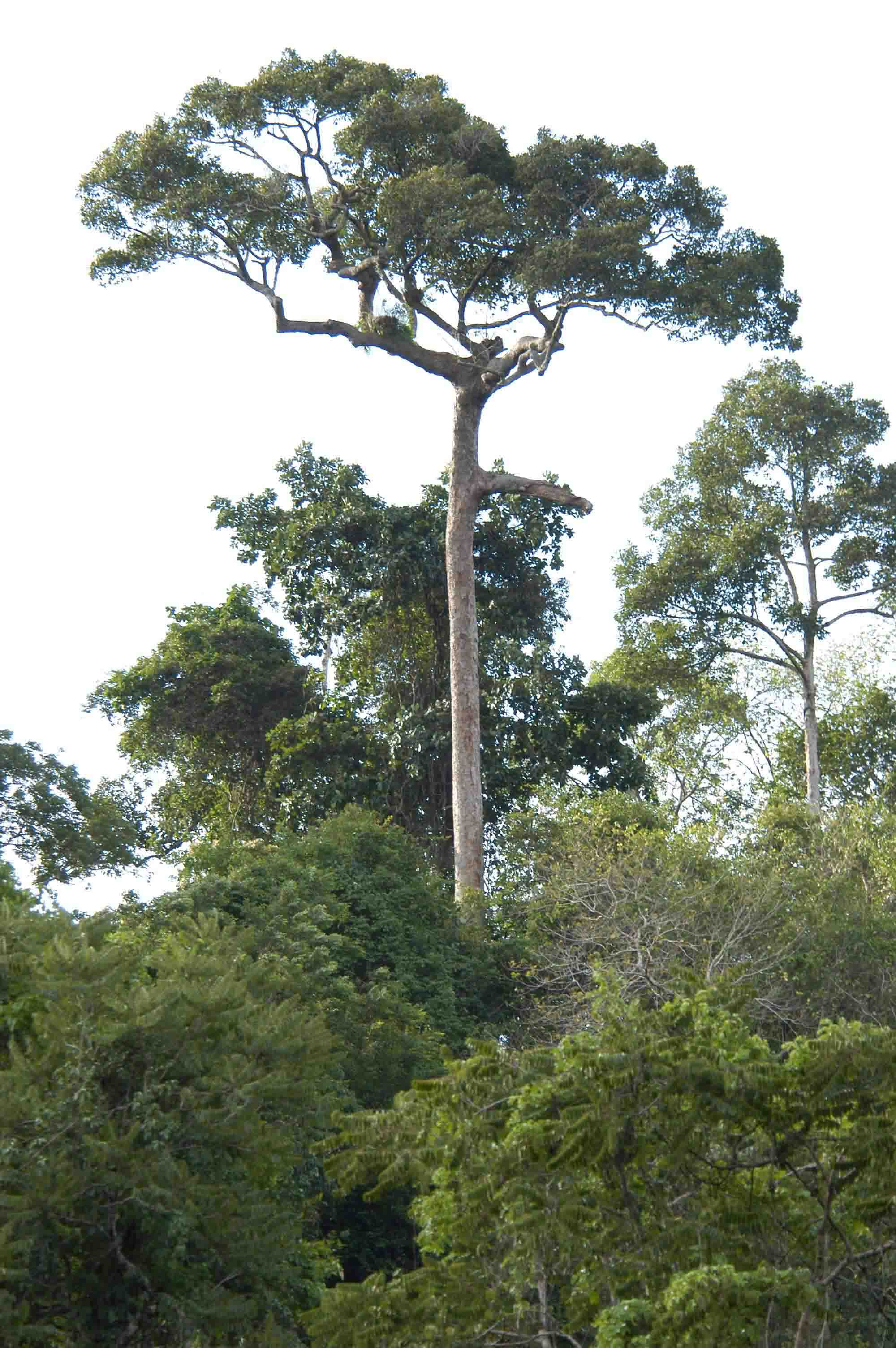
Tree rising above the canopy in Khao Yai forest

Khao Yai National Park is a national park in Thailand. Established in 1962 as Thailand's first national park, it is the third largest national park in Thailand.

== History ==
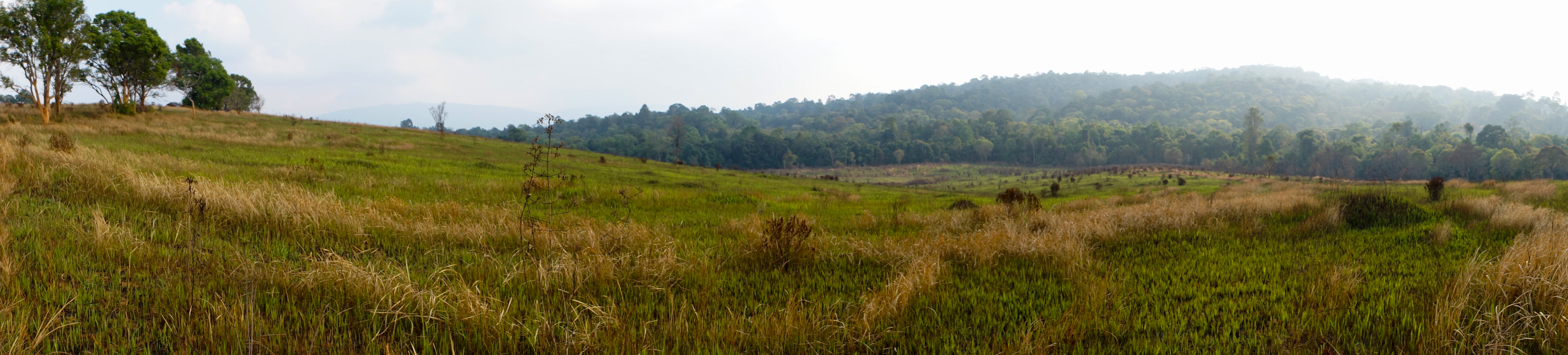
Nong Pak Chee grassland

Khao Yai National Park was established on 18 September 1962, declared by royal proclamation in the Government Gazette as the first national park of Thailand. A major role in its establishment was played by Boonsong Lekagul. It was named after the defunct tambon, Khao Yai.

In 1984, Khao Yai National Park was made an ASEAN Heritage Park, and on 14 July 2005, it was proclaimed a UNESCO World Heritage Site under the name Dong Phayayen–Khao Yai Forest Complex together with other national parks in the same range and in the Dong Phaya Yen Mountains further north. As the lands adjacent to the national park are becoming increasingly developed into luxury hotels and golf courses, acquiring land for future wildlife conservation efforts is becoming problematic. Homes and residential villas have been built illegally within the limits of the protected area of the forest. Illegal logging is also a problem in the area.

== Geography ==
Khao Yai National Park is the third largest in Thailand with an area of about 2,166 km^{2} (836 sq mi). Khao Rom is the highest mountain in Khao Yai National Park with an elevation of 1,351 m (4,432 ft). Since this mountain is spiral shaped, it is called Khao Laem (เขาแหลม; Lit: Spiky Mountain). Khao Laem is the park's 2nd highest mountain, the highest being Khao Rom. Similar to Khao Rom, reaching the peak of the mountain is also only possible on foot. Reaching the peak of the mountain takes no less than 7 hours. Before reaching the absolute summit, one must also climb up a rope.

Khao Yai National Park in overview PARO 1 (Prachinburi)

1) Khao Yai National Park in overview PARO 1 (Prachinburi)

	National park
1	Khao Yai
2	Pang Sida
3	Ta Phraya
4	Thap Lan

=== Climate ===
Khao Yai National Park has three main seasons, with an annual mean temperature of 23 °C, though this varies greatly with the seasons.

- Rainy season (May–October): Most days have high rates of precipitation. The atmosphere is humid with average temperatures of 27 °C during the day dropping to 13 °C at night. Streams at peak flow.
- Cool season (November–February): Clear skies, sunny and cool. Average temperatures of 22 °C during the day and 10 °C at night. Good time for hiking.
- Hot season (March–April): Humid with daytime temperatures of 20–30 °C and 17 °C at night.

== Fauna ==
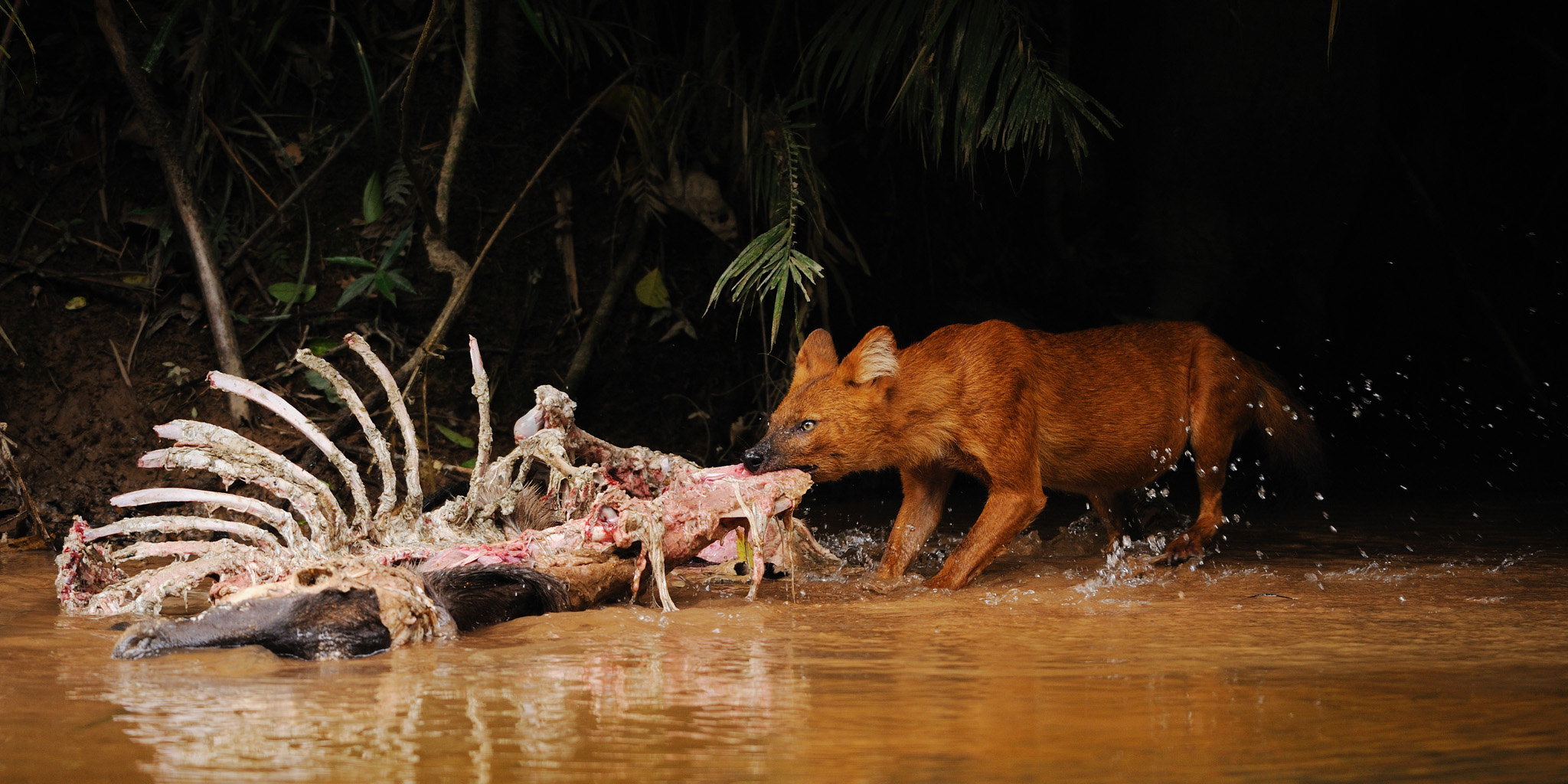
Dhole feeding on a sambar carcass in Khao Yai

Khao Yai National Park is home to the Asian elephant, gibbons, pig-tailed macaque, muntjacs and sambar deer. Other large animals include barking deer, porcupine, and civet. Other species that can occasionally be seen include sun bear, Asian black bear, gaur, otter, dhole and golden jackal. In early 2017, it was announced that 18 tigers, including five males, seven female and six cubs, were filmed by surveillance cameras in the Dong Phaya Yen-Khao Yai world heritage site in June 2016 and February 2017. The last time that tigers were seen by surveillance cameras in Khao Yai National Park was in 2002.

== Visitors ==
According to the Department of National Parks (DNP), which manages the park, visitors to Khao Yai have risen from 671,569 in 2008 to more than 1.2 million in FY2016. From October 2015 to September 2016, 471,514 vehicles entered the park. The congestion has led to demands to close the park to private vehicles. During one of its busiest periods, New Year's week from 30 December – 3 January 2016, the park received 156,574 visitors. They left in excess of 23 tonnes of waste behind. As litter was a serious problem at the park, in 2020 the park started mailing litter to the homes of visitors who left it there.

== See also ==
- Sankamphaeng Range
- List of national parks of Thailand
- List of Protected Areas Regional Offices of Thailand
