= Ta Phraya National Park =

National park in Thailand

- อุทยานแห่งชาติตาพระยา
- IUCN category II (national park)
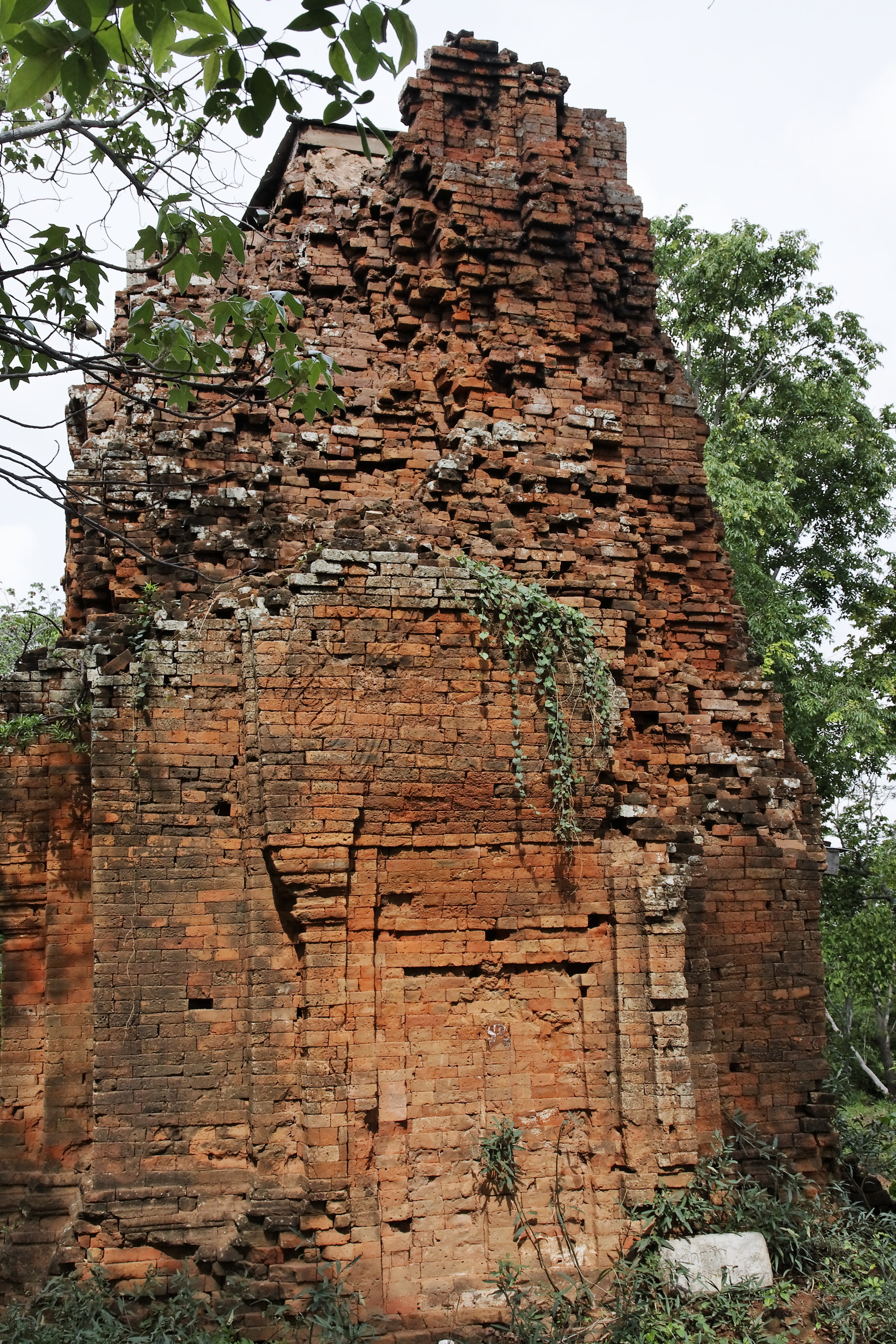
- Prasat Khao Lon ruins
- Interactive map of Ta Phraya National Park
- Location: Buriram and Sa Kaeo Provinces
- Coordinates: 14°07′N 102°40′E
- Area: 594 km^{2} (229 sq mi)
- Established: 1996
- Visitors: 3,398 (in 2019)
- Governing body: Department of National Park, Wildlife and Plant Conservation (DNP)

Ta Phraya National Park (Thai: อุทยานแห่งชาติตาพระยา, RTGS: Utthayan Haeng Chat Ta Phraya, pronounced [ʔùt.tʰā.jāːn hɛ̀ŋ tɕʰâːt tāː pʰrā.jāː]) is a protected area at the eastern end of the Sankamphaeng Range in the area where these mountains meet the Dangrek Range, near the Thai-Cambodian border. It is largely in Ta Phraya District, Sa Kaeo Province, district after which it is named, although the park also includes sectors of Ban Kruat, Non Din Daeng, and Lahan Sai Districts of Buriram Province. The park, with an area of 371,250 rai ~ 594 square kilometres (229 sq mi) is east of Pang Sida National Park. It was established in 1996. It is part of the Dong Phayayen–Khao Yai Forest Complex UNESCO World Heritage Site.

Elevations range between 206 and 579 m. The highest mountain is Khao Pran Nut (ยอดเขาพรานนุช). There are also some ancient Khmer temple ruins in the park area such as Prasat Khao Lon.

Between the 1970s and the 1990s there were refugee camps for Cambodians in this part of the border zone.

== Climate ==
The weather usually influenced by southwestern monsoon and northeastern monsoon. In the southwestern monsoon from May to October, there are high humidity winds blowing from the Andaman Sea and the Gulf of Thailand causing rain, about 1–1.4 m (3 ft 3 in – 4 ft 7 in) per year. The weather consists of three seasons: summer from February to April; rain from May to October; winter from November to January. Average temperature is 39.8 °C (103.6 °F) and the lowest temperature is 14.3 °C (57.7 °F).

== Flora and fauna ==
The forested areas of the park include mixed deciduous forest, dry evergreen forest, and deciduous dipterocarp forest.

Ta Phraya National Park is also home to the endangered Siamese rosewood, a tree species that is being extracted illegally for sale in especially the Chinese furniture market. Armed poachers are coming across the border from Cambodia, and rangers are since 2015 trained in military style counter-poaching measures

== Location ==
Ta Phraya National Park in overview PARO 1 (Prachinburi)

3) Ta Phraya National Park in overview PARO 1 (Prachinburi)

	National park
1	Khao Yai
2	Pang Sida
3	Ta Phraya
4	Thap Lan

== See also ==
- List of Protected Areas Regional Offices of Thailand
