= John Blackwood =

John Blackwood may refer to:

- John Blackwood (publisher) (1818–1879), Scottish publisher
- Sir John Blackwood, 2nd Baronet (1722–1799), Irish politician and baronet
- Jock Blackwood (1899–c. 1970), Australian rugby union player
- John Blackwood (merchant) (before 1777–1819), Canadian merchant
- John Blackwood (footballer, born 1877) (1877–1913), Scottish footballer
- John Blackwood (footballer, born 1935), Scottish footballer
- Johnny Blackwood, fictional character in Act of Love
- John Blackwood (art dealer) (1696–1777), Scottish art dealer
- John Arthur Blackwood (1904–1973), British Hong Kong businessman
- John Blackwood, 11th Baron Dufferin and Claneboye (born 1944), Australian architect
