= Sankamphaeng Range =

Mountain range in Thailand

- ทิวเขาสันกำแพง
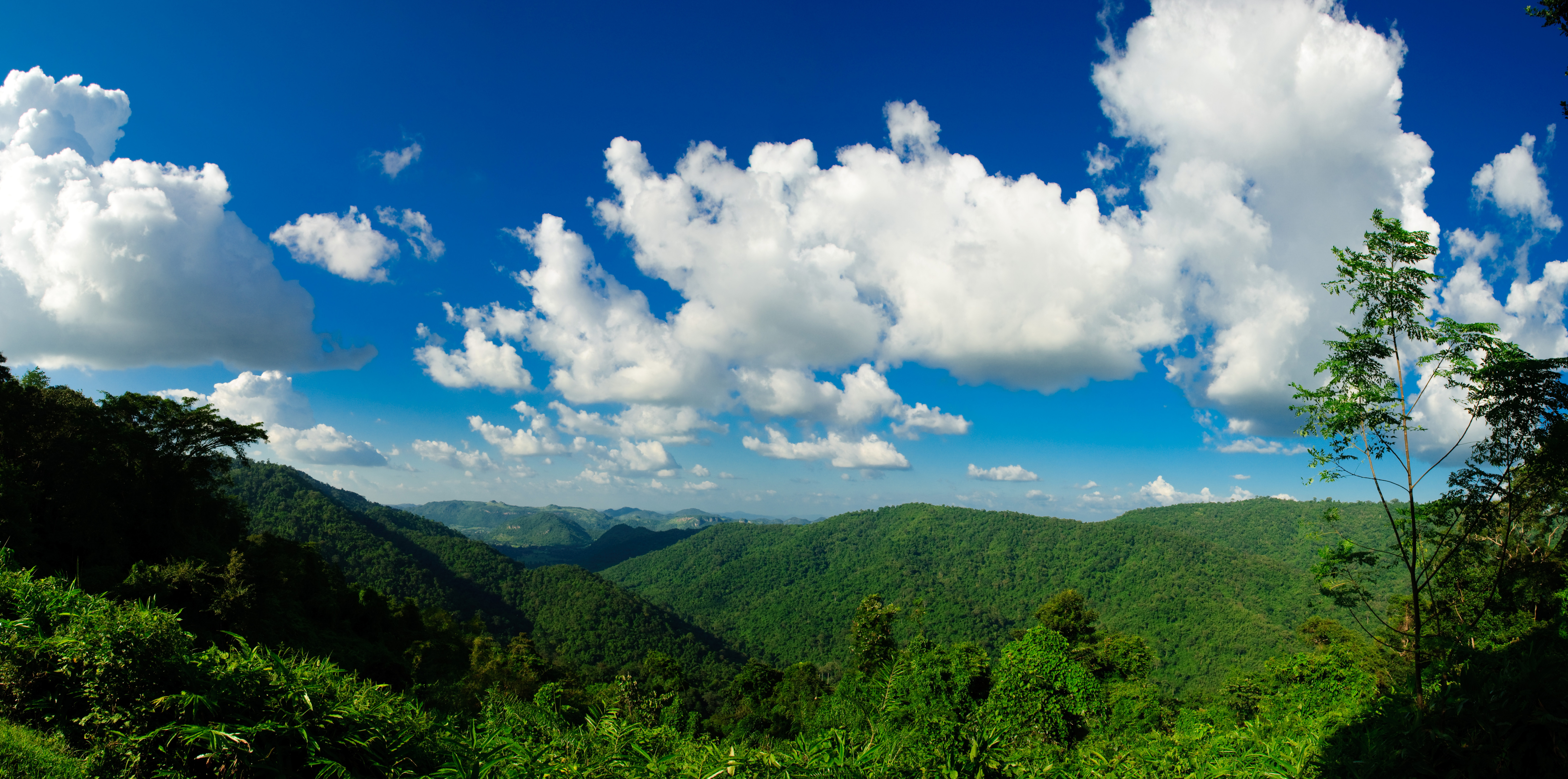
- View of the forested mountains of the Sankamphaeng Range in the Khao Yai National Park area

Highest point
- Peak: Khao Rom
- Elevation: 1,351 m (4,432 ft)

Dimensions
- Length: 180 km (110 mi) E/W
- Width: 40 km (25 mi) N/S

Geography
- Mountain ranges in Central and northeastern Thailand
- Country: Thailand
- Provinces: Nakhon Nayok, Prachinburi, Sa Kaeo, Saraburi and Nakhon Ratchasima
- Range coordinates: 14°26.5′N 101°23′E
- Borders on: Dong Phaya Yen Mountains and Dângrêk Mountains

Geology
- Rock types: Sandstone and conglomerate

The Sankamphaeng Range, also Sankambeng Range or Sungumpang Range (Thai: ทิวเขาสันกำแพง, RTGS: Thio Khao San Kamphaeng, pronounced [tʰīw kʰǎw sǎn kām.pʰɛ̄ːŋ]; Northeastern Thai: ทิวเขาสันกำแพง, pronounced [tʰîw kʰǎw sǎn kàm.pʰɛ̂ːŋ]) is one of the mountain ranges separating eastern Thailand from the northeast or Isan. It is in Nakhon Nayok, Prachinburi, Sa Kaeo, Saraburi, and Nakhon Ratchasima Provinces, Thailand.

== Description ==
The meaning of the word Sankamphaeng in the Thai language is fortification or counterfort. It is a fitting name to describe this mountain range that effectively constituted a natural buttress between the Khorat Plateau and the plain of Central Thailand.

The mountain chain runs in a WNW-ESE direction. The northern part of the Sankamphaeng mountain range merges with the southern end of the Dong Phaya Yen Mountains, which run roughly in a north-south direction at the southwestern boundary of the Khorat Plateau.

To the east this range connects with the Dângrêk Mountains, a longer system running in an east-west direction that stretches into Laos. The southern mountainsides of the range drain into the Prachinburi River.

The range is divided in two compact massifs where the highest elevations are in the west. The highest point in the Sankamphaeng Range is the 1,351 m high Khao Rom, also known as Khao Khiao. Other peaks are 1,326 m high Khao Laem, 1,313 m high Khao Chan, 1,112 m high Khao Falami, 1,142 m high Khao Sam Yot, 1,052 m high Khao Inthani, 1,071 m high Khao Fa Pha, 1,017 m high Khao Kaeo, 821 m high Khao Salat Dai, 805 m high Khao Samo Pun, 787 m high Khao Laem Noi, and 824 m high Khao Phaeng Ma. Finally, 875 m high Kao Kamphaeng and 558 m high Kao Dan Fai Mai are at the eastern end of the western massif, where there is a valley through which passes Hwy 304 (AH 19), between Kabin Buri town and Nakhon Ratchasima.

The eastern massif begins at 992 m high Khao Lamang, 949 m high Phu Sam Ngam, and 843 m high Khao Tap Tao. At this point a branch of the massif extends northeastwards with 748 m high Khao Chawae and 723 m high Khao Plai Lam Katuk, connecting with the southern end of the Dong Phaya Yen Range. Further east there are two mountains with the name "Khao Yai", a 776 m high Khao Yai located north of 761 m high Khao Thuang and a 796 m high Khao Yai located to the south. Further eastwards the average height of the peaks descends to around 400 m and Hwy 348 crosses in this lower area from north to south where the range connects with the Dângrêk Mountains.

Several rivers originate in the Sankamphaeng mountains, of which the Mun River flowing eastwards is the largest. Another important river is the Klong Praprong.

Administratively, most of the area of the range is under Prachinburi and Sa Kaeo Provinces, with smaller parts in Nakhon Ratchasima, Nakhon Nayok, and Saraburi Provinces.

There are sandstone outcrops in the south and north of the range. Shales and schist are also present. In the southern side steep slopes made of granite and conglomerates can be seen. Limestone is present towards the eastern end close to the Dangrek Mountains.

== History ==
Around 1922 a group of people from Ban Tha Dan and Ban Tha Chai villages in Nakhon Nayok Province built a settlement in the forest in the western part of these mountains. Up to 30 households cultivated the newly deforested land. The area was formally recognized by the government and classified as "Tambon Khao Yai" within Pak Phli District, although the nearest mountain named "Khao Yai" was at the other end of the range.

Owing to its location and distance from the authorities, the new subdistrict soon became a refuge for criminals and fugitives. After an attempt by government forces to capture the outlaws in the area, the villagers were relocated onto the plains some 30 km away. In 1932 the tambon status of Khao Yai Subdistrict was cancelled.

In 1959, then Prime Minister of Thailand, Marshall Sarit Thanarat, coordinated the Ministry of Agriculture and the Ministry of the Interior in order to initiate a process where areas of the country could be officially set aside as national parks.

Khao Yai National Park was subsequently established on 18 September 1962 and was declared by royal proclamation in the Thai Government Gazette as the first national park in Thailand. The park was named after the defunct Tambon Khao Yai. Boonsong Lekakul, one of the 20th century's most famous conservationists in Thailand, played a major role in the establishment of the protected area.

During the Vietnam War there was a US military Air Defense Radar Station of the 621 TCS Tactical Control Squadron, at the top of Khao Rom, also known as Khao Khiao, the highest summit of the range.

In 1982 a road was built that made it easy for Bangkok residents to reach the main protected area of the mountains.

== Ecology ==
The protected areas of the range face problems of encroachment. Homes and residential villas have been built illegally within the limits of officially protected areas of the forest in Khao Yai and in Thap Lan National Park. Illegal logging is also a problem in the area of the park, the forests of these mountains being among the places in Thailand affected by the logging and smuggling of Phayung (Siamese rosewood) trees. Although officially a protected tree, the cutting and trading of endangered rosewood trees has been going on unabated in Thailand's mountainous forested zones, even in the protected areas such as Thap Lan, Pang Sida, and Ta Phraya National Parks, as well as in the Dong Yai Wildlife Sanctuary. In China this wood is highly valued in the furniture industry and its price has shot up in the last few years.

Among the endangered animal species of the range the Sunda pangolin deserves mention.

This range, together with the Dong Phaya Yen Mountains further north, forms the Dong Phayayen - Khao Yai Forest Complex, which includes several national parks. This area was inscribed on the UNESCO World Heritage List. Altogether 6,155 km^{2} are protected in the complex.

=== Protected areas ===
- Khao Yai National Park, covering an area of 2,165.5 km^{2}, is the largest national park in the Sankamphaeng mountains and one of the most famous in Thailand.
- Phra Phutthachai National Park
- Pang Sida National Park
- Thap Lan National Park
- Ta Phraya National Park, the easternmost natural reserve of the range, in Ta Phraya District.
- Dong Yai Wildlife Sanctuary

== See also ==
- Dong Phaya Yen Mountains
