= Dong Phaya Yen Mountains =

Mountain range in Thailand

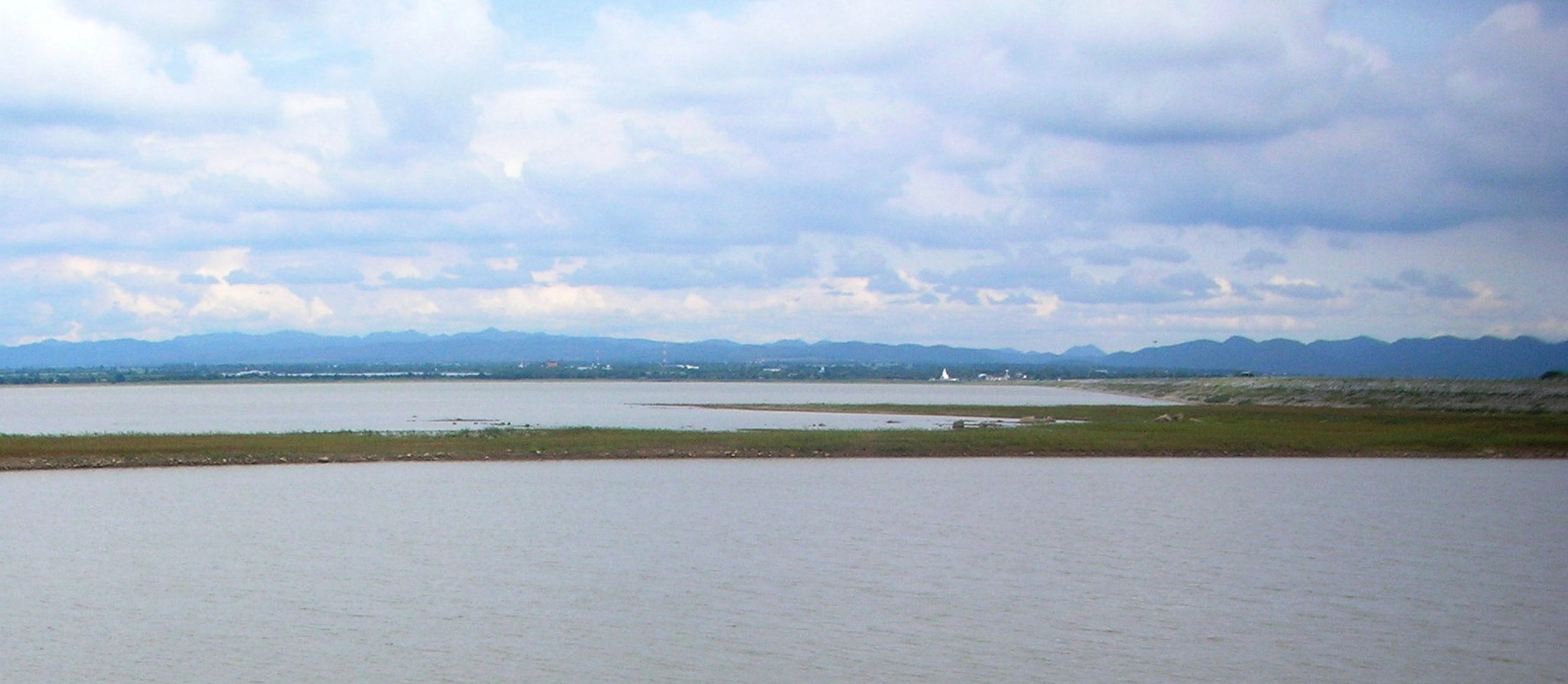
- The Dong Phaya Yen Mountains rising east of Pa Sak Cholasit Dam

Highest point
- Peak: Phu Khing
- Elevation: 1,167 m (3,829 ft)

Dimensions
- Length: 170 km (110 mi) NW/SE
- Width: 40 km (25 mi) NE/SW

Geography
- Mountain ranges in northeastern Thailand
- Country: Thailand
- Provinces: Phetchabun; Chaiyaphum; Lopburi; Saraburi; Nakhon Ratchasima
- Range coordinates: 14°20′N 102°03′E
- Borders on: Phetchabun Mountains; Sankamphaeng Range

Geology
- Rock type(s): Sandstone and limestone

Dong Phaya Yen or Dong Phya Yen (Thai: ทิวเขาดงพญาเย็น, pronounced [dōŋ pʰā.jāː jēn]; Northeastern Thai: ทิวเขาดงพญาเย็น, pronounced [dòŋ pʰā.ɲâː jèn], lit. "jungle of the cold lord") is a mountain range in Phetchabun, Chaiyaphum, Lopburi, Saraburi, and Nakhon Ratchasima Provinces, Thailand.

As the Dong Phaya Yen is less compact and lower in height than the mountain ranges to the north and to the south, the first roads and railroads connecting the region of Isan with the capital Bangkok were built across these mountains. Before the construction of the railroad at the beginning of the 20th century, communication between these two parts of Thailand was difficult. The survey for the building of the Northeastern Line of the State Railway of Thailand began in 1887.

== Geography ==
The Dong Phaya Yen Mountains consist mainly of a range of scattered medium-height hills stretching southwards of the Phetchabun Mountains in an arch until reaching the northern side of the Sankamphaeng Range. The mountain chain has a length of about 170 km and reaches a maximum elevation of 1,167 m at Phu Khing at the northern end. Other peaks are 900 m high Khao Phang Yai, 767 m high Khao Kheuan Lan, 782 m high Khao Cham Dot, 718 m high Khao Chalong Tong, 745 m high Khao Chan Luang, 722 m high Khao Lom, 722 m high Khao Sawong, 721 m high Khao Wong Chan Daeng, 689 m high Khao Phrik, 695 m high Khao Somphot, 657 m high Khao Kradon, 676 m high Khao Inthaya, 683 m high Khao Mot Ngam, 655 m high Khao Plai Khlong Kum, and 575 m high Khao Sadao.

The northern limit of the Phetchabun massif is not clearly defined, roughly beginning south of the 16th parallel north where the ranges forming the Phetchabun system become a group of scattered mountains of lesser height, rarely surpassing 800 m, extending southwards. The eastern mountain chain of the Phetchabun Range is mentioned as the "Phang Hoei Range" in some geographical works, a name that encompasses the whole northern section of the Dong Phaya Yen mountain system, for Khao Phang Hoei is a 1,008 m high summit west of Chaiyaphum town, beyond the southern end of the Phetchabun Range proper in the northern half of the Dong Phaya Yen.

The Dong Phaya Yen range divides the Chao Phraya river valley of central Thailand and the Khorat Plateau of the northeast. The mountains are drained to the east by several tributaries to the Chi and the Mun and to the west by tributaries of the Pa Sak River.

== History ==
This whole mountainous region was covered by thick forest and was formerly known as Dong Phaya Fai or "jungle of the fire lord". There were no roads, hence it was not possible to use a cart. Travel across the forest had to be on foot or using palanquins. The whole area was reputed to be unhealthy and travelers who dared to pass through the woods exposed themselves to malaria and other illnesses. By the mid-19th century, when the clearing of the area began, Vice King (Uparaja) Pinklao changed the name of the forest from Dong Phaya Fai to Dong Phaya Yen to imply that "the wild forest had been tamed".

By 1887 the Siamese government decided to build a railway line from Bangkok to Korat through Ayutthaya and commissioned British Railway contractors to make a survey. The first section of what is now the Northeastern Line, the railway line to Korat across the mountains opened in 1900. Much of the original forest cover of the mountains was destroyed since the beginning of 20th century. Following the completion of the line settlements were built in the area and trees were cut and land converted to agricultural use.

Until quite recently only the railroad from Bangkok to Nakhon Ratchasima and one highway crossed the system. Deforestation increased as the building of more roads connecting central Thailand and Isan began in earnest. Thailand Route 2, also known as "Mittraphap Road", the main road crossing the range between Saraburi and Nakhon Ratchasima, was built in 1950.

== Protected areas ==
These mountains, together with the Sankamphaeng Range at their southern limit, form the Dong Phayayen-Khao Yai Forest Complex, which includes several national parks. This area was inscribed on the UNESCO World Heritage List in 2005. Altogether 6,155 km^{2} are protected in the complex. In mid-2016 UNESCO briefly considered placing the Dong Phayayen-Khao Yai Forest on a list of endangered World Heritage sites because Thailand had not done enough to stop illegal logging of phayung (Siamese rosewood) trees.

Other protected areas in the Dong Phaya Yen mountains are:

- Pa Hin Ngam National Park
- Sai Thong National Park
- Phu Khiao Wildlife Sanctuary
- Tat Ton National Park
- Nam Phong National Park
- Phu Lan Ka National Park,
- Sap Langka Wildlife Sanctuary
- Khao Somphot Non-hunting Area.

== Gallery ==
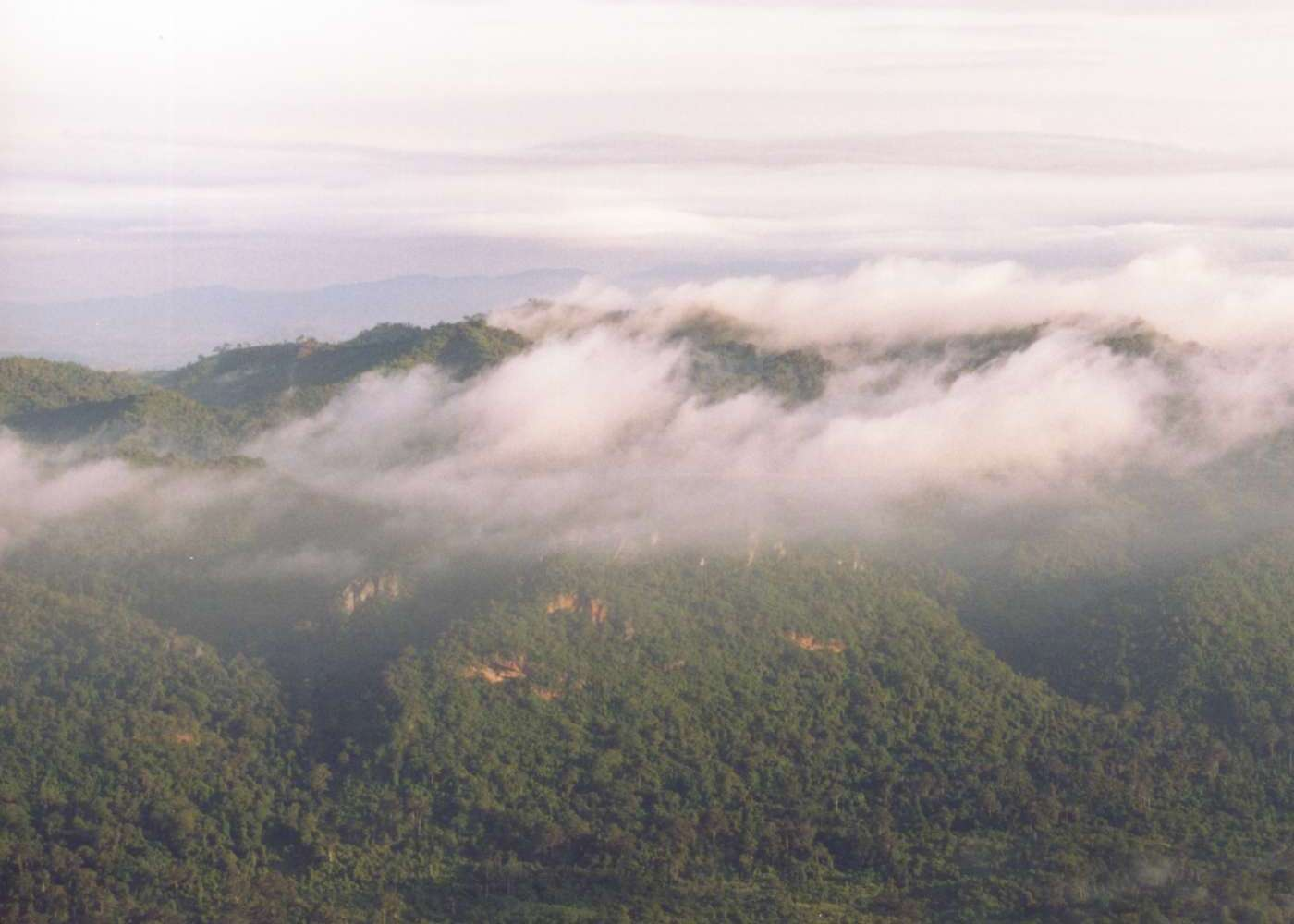
The Luak ridge in morning fog with the Sonthi valley in front

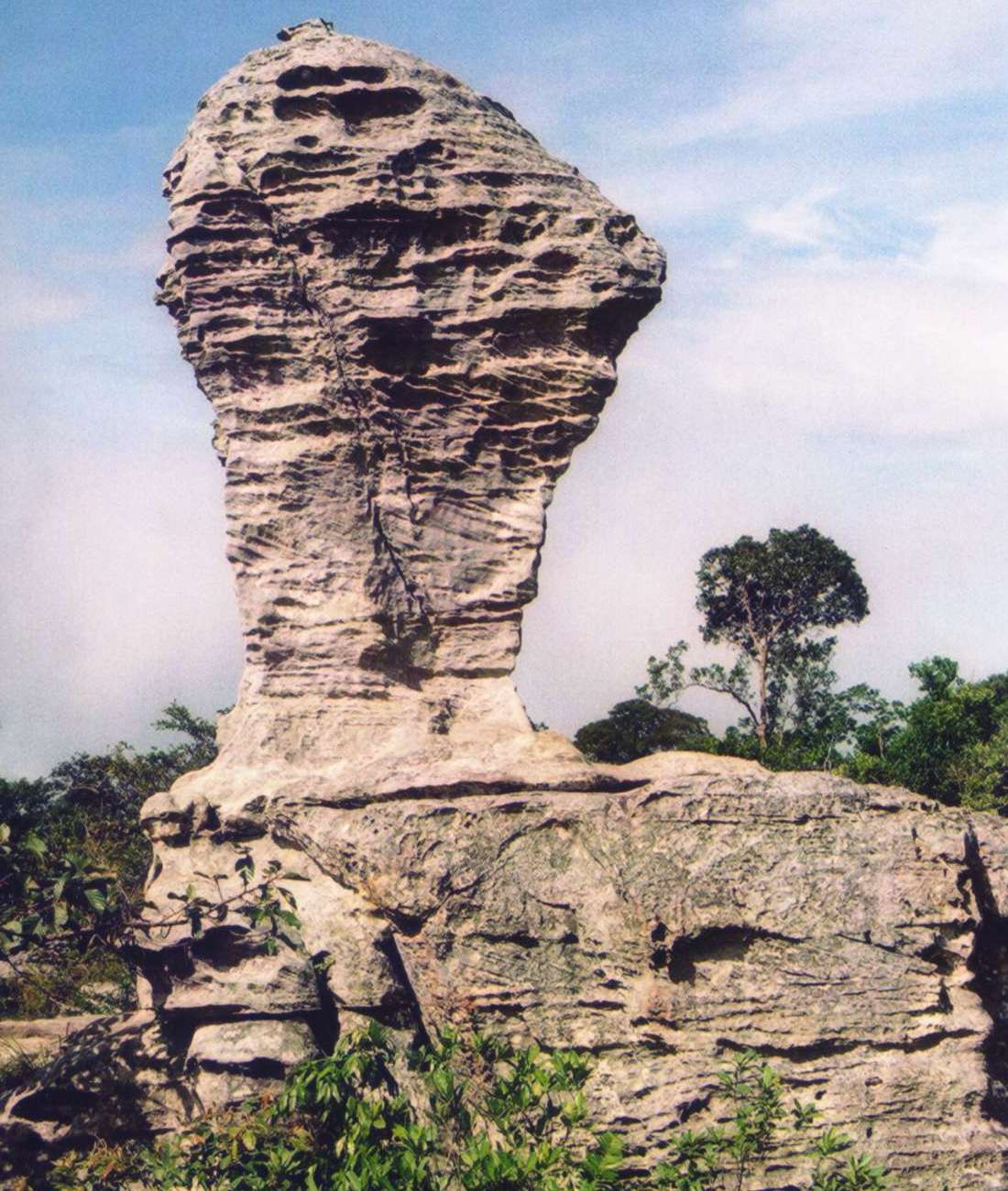
Rock formations at Pa Hin Ngam National Park

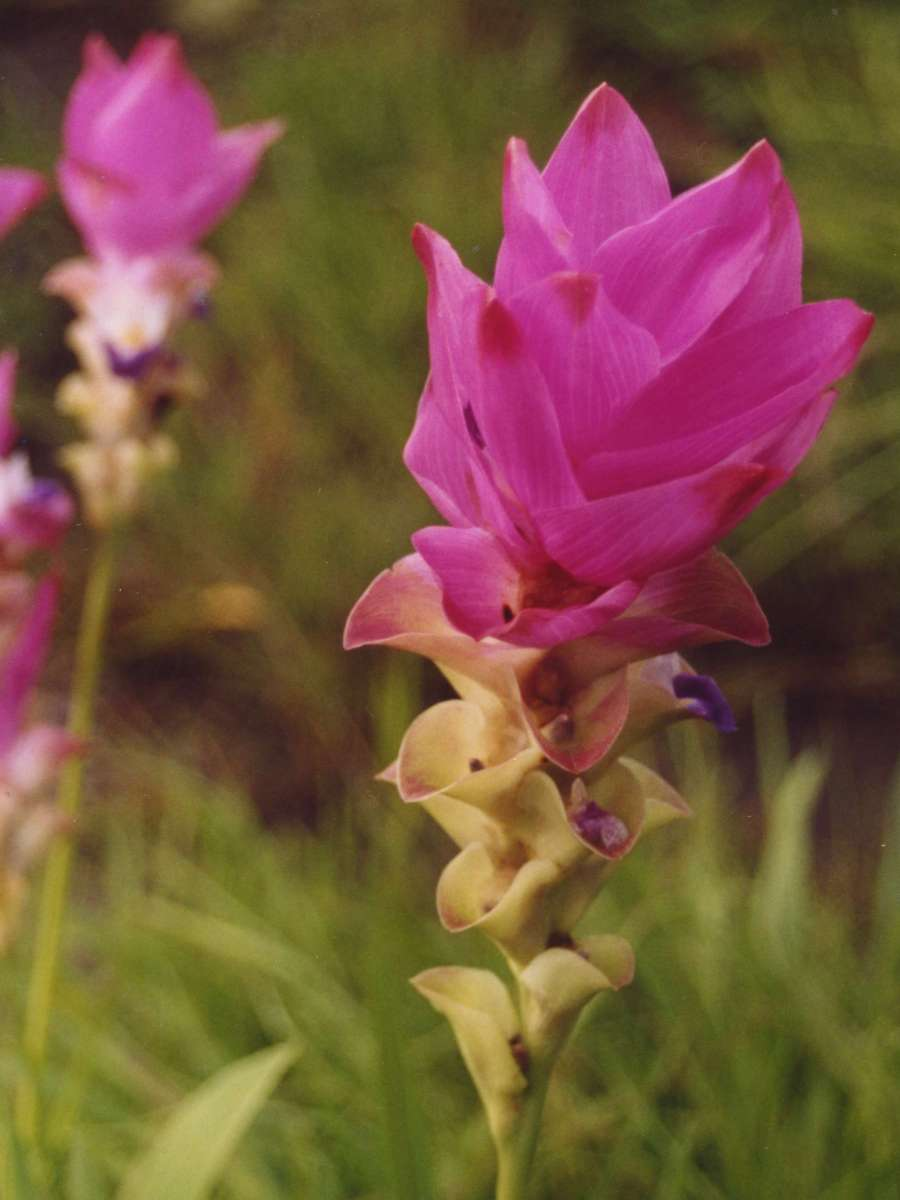
Siam Tulip at Pa Hin Ngam National park

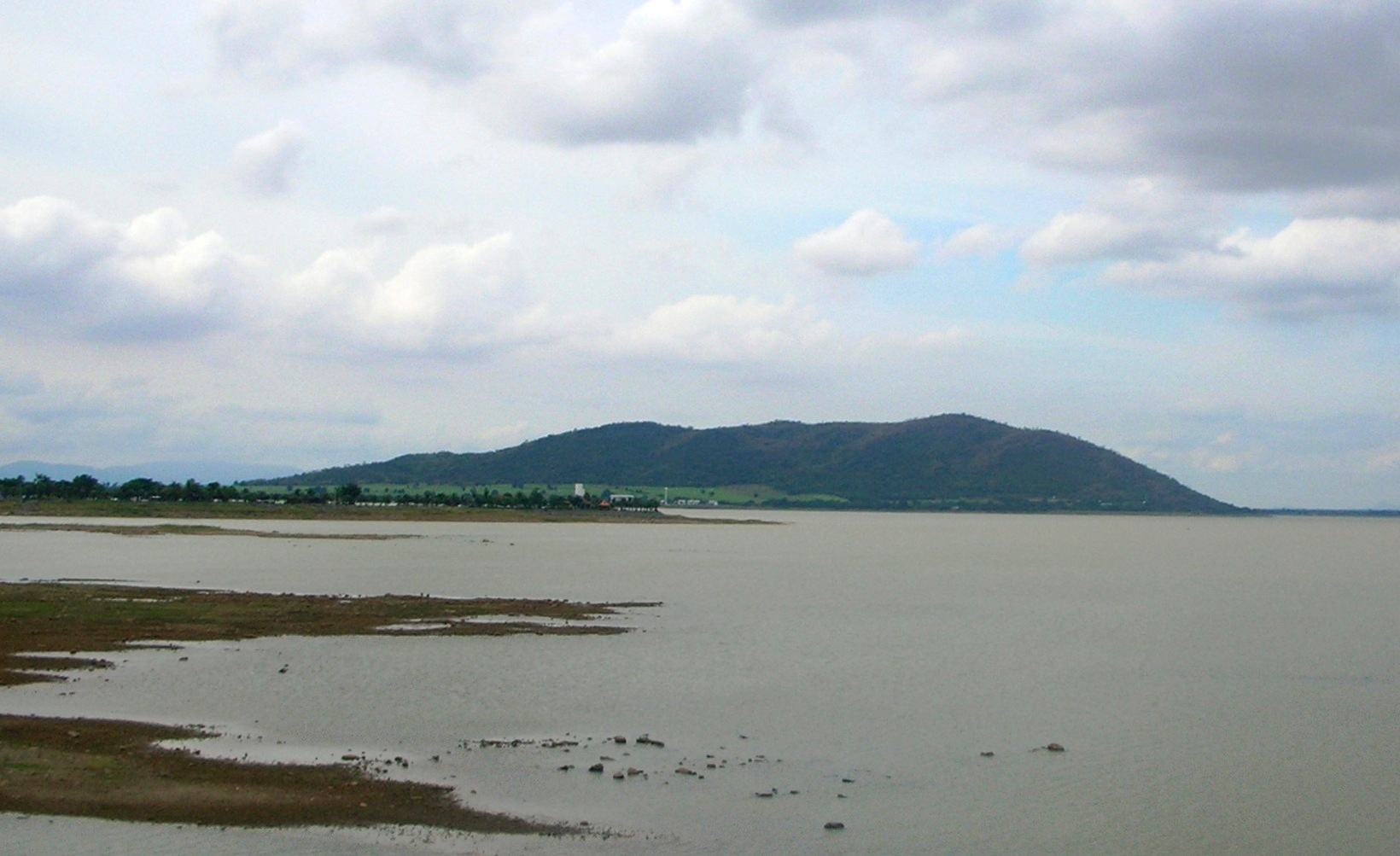
Khao Kok Tako and the Pa Sak Cholasit Dam

== See also ==
- Sankamphaeng Range
