= Michael Blackwood =

Michael Blackwood may refer to:

- Michael Blackwood (filmmaker) (1934–2023), American filmmaker
- Michael Blackwood (footballer) (born 1979), English footballer
- Michael Blackwood (sprinter) (born 1976), Jamaican track and field athlete
- Michael Hill Blackwood (1917–2005), British lawyer and politician in Nyasaland and Malawi
