= Thap Lan National Park =

National park in Thailand

- IUCN category II (national park)
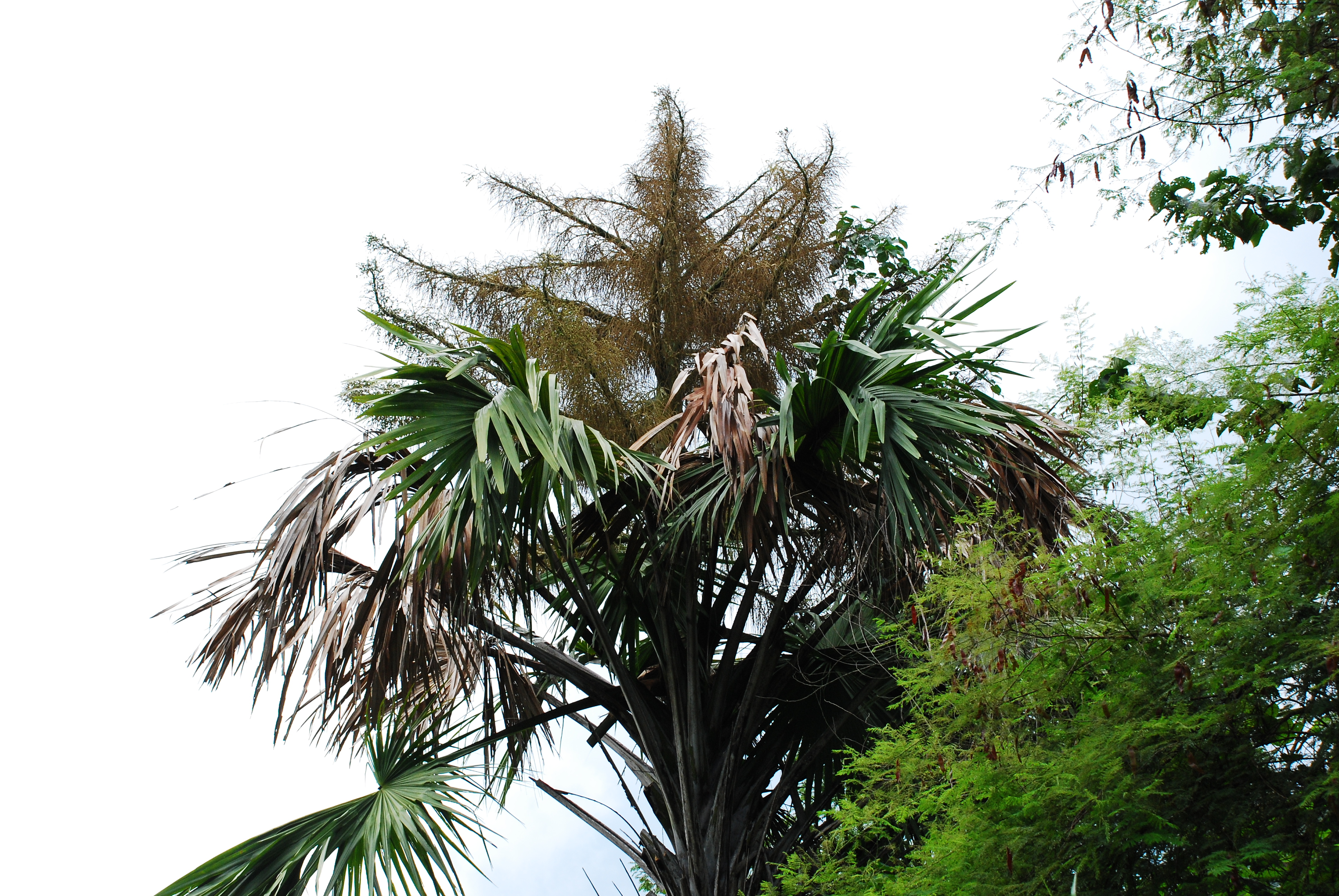
- Interactive map of Thap Lan National Park
- Location: Prachinburi and Nakhon Ratchasima Provinces, Thailand
- Nearest city: Kabin Buri
- Coordinates: 14°12′N 101°55′E
- Area: 2,236 km^{2} (863 sq mi)
- Established: 23 December 1981
- Visitors: 57,075 (in 2019)
- Governing body: Department of National Park, Wildlife and Plant Conservation (DNP)

Thap Lan National Park (Thai: อุทยานแห่งชาติทับลาน, RTGS: Utthayan Haeng Chat Thap Lan, pronounced [ʔùt.tʰā.jāːn hɛ̀ŋ t͡ɕʰâːt tʰáp lāːn]) is in the Sankamphaeng Range in Prachinburi, Nakhon Ratchasima Provinces, Thailand. Established as a national park on 23 December 1981, it was the country's 40th national park. It is part of the Dong Phayayen–Khao Yai Forest Complex UNESCO World Heritage Site. Its attractions include Lan Forest and Recreational Garden (ป่าลานและสวนพักผ่อนหย่อนใจ); Namtok Thap Lan (or Namtok Heo Nok Kok) (น้ำตกทับลานหรือน้ำตกเหวนกกก); Thap Lan Reservoir (อ่างเก็บน้ำทับลาน); Namtok Huai Yai (น้ำตกห้วยใหญ่); Lam Mun Bon Dam (เขื่อนลำมูลบน); Hat Chom Tawan (หาดชมตะวัน).

== Geography ==
With an area of 1,397,375 rai ~ 2,236 square kilometres (863 sq mi), it is Thailand's second largest national park. Thap Lan's headquarters is in Bu Phram, Na Di, Prachinburi Province. It encompasses Bu Phram Subdistrict, Na Di District, Prachinburi; Pak Thong Chai District, Wang Nam Khiao District, Khon Buri District, and Soeng Sang District of Nakhon Ratchasima Province; and Pakham District of Buriram Province. The highest peak is 992 metres (3,255 ft) high Khao Lamang. The terrain includes mountain ranges, valleys, chasms, and waterfalls.

== Climate ==
Thap Lan has three seasons, with a mean annual temperature of 28 °C. The rainy season extends from May to October, when it rains most days. The wettest month is October. In the rainy season around 269 mm of rain falls at Thap Lan. The cold season is from November to February. The coolest month is December, with an average daily maximum of 24 °C. The hot season is March and April, when temperatures can reach 31 °C.

== Flora ==
Most of Thap Lan is covered in dry evergreen forest, particularly on lower mountain slopes. There are a number of important plant species found within this forest type, including Dipterocarps and Hopia. Bamboo is also often found in drier forests.

Near Ban Thap Lan, Ban Khun Sri Bupram, and Ban Wang Mued, are rare fan palm or Talipot palm forests. These forests covered much of the northeast region of Thailand in the past, though the spread of agriculture saw the destruction of a large number of palm forests. Today, Thap Lan is home to one of the few such forests remaining in Thailand. The fan palm is important in Thai culture as its leaves were used as the parchment on which Buddhist texts were inscribed. Fan palms are an ancient plant that produce a single massive inflorescence, the largest in the plant kingdom, containing up to 60 million flowers. After this huge exertion of energy, the tree dies.

== Fauna ==
As Thap Lan National Park covers such a large area, and is connected to Khao Yai, Pang Sida, and Ta Praya National Parks, it is home to a number of wild animals, including tigers, elephants, buffaloes, bangtang, serow, black bears, sun bears, crown gibbons, hornbills, pheasants, and lorikeets. According to researchers, the park may have more tigers than China. A total of 149 bird species have been confirmed within the park, including several rare species restricted to low-land evergreen forest, such as the green imperial pigeon, stork-billed kingfisher, scaly-crowned babbler, Collared kingfisher and Jerdon's baza. In dense forest near water are Green dragontail butterflies.

There is hope that one of the world's most endangered mammals, the kouprey, may still survive in Thap Lan and Pang Sida National Parks. Though one has not been sighted within Thailand for more than 30 years, this primitive cattle species could provide genes valuable in the production of disease-free strains of domestic cattle.

== Conservation ==
Queen Sirikit's Dong Phayayen-Khao Yai Forest Complex includes Thap Lan and five other related areas: Khao Yai National Park, Pang Sida National Park, Ta Phraya National Park, Phra Phuttha Chai National Park, and Dongyai Wildlife Sanctuary. While elephant hunting is common in the Dangrek Range, elephants are better protected in Thap Lan.

Illegal encroachments on park boundaries have been an unsolved problem in Thap Lan National Park for almost 40 years. In May 2012, a resort was charged with forest encroachment when three illegal buildings were found on 20 rai of park land. In 2017, a second raid was conducted at the same resort. It was found to have illegally occupied 34 rai with 18 buildings. Prosecutors in November 2018 declined to indict the resort's operator for encroachment, leading the Bangkok Post to warn that, "As long as the DNP [Department of National Parks] continues to issue 'demolition orders' against luxury resorts without following through on the threat, the problem will remain unsolved."

== Location ==
Thap Lan National Park in overview PARO 1 (Prachinburi)

4) Thap Lan National Park in overview PARO 1 (Prachinburi)

	National park
1	Khao Yai
2	Pang Sida
3	Ta Phraya
4	Thap Lan

== See also ==
- List of Protected Areas Regional Offices of Thailand
