= Ryan Blackwood =

Caymanian chess player (born 1985)

Personal information
- Born: 1985 (age 40–41)

Chess career
- Country: Jamaica (until 2023); Cayman Islands (since 2023)
- Peak rating: 1978 (April 2014)

Ryan Oliver Blackwood is a Caymanian chess player. He is the national team captain of the Caymanian women's Olympiad team and the youth director of the Cayman Islands Chess Federation.

== Chess career ==
Born in Jamaica, Blackwood began playing chess in 2009, earning his National Master title from the Jamaican Chess Federation a year later.

In July 2020, he won the open section of the R&D Chess Academy's Showdown & Invitational Chess Tournament.

He moved to the Cayman Islands in 2022 and transferred federations in 2023.

In March 2024, he finished in 9th place in the Caribbean Blitz Championship.

In February 2026, he finished in second place in the Cayman Islands National Chess Championship with a score of 7/9, half a point behind winner Mike McDonald.

In September 2026, he played for the Cayman Islands on the top board in the 46th Chess Olympiad, where he scored 4.5/11.

He is also a chess coach; one of his students won the U14 Serge Island School Chess Championship in 2016.
