= Blackwoods Gin =

Alcoholic drinks brand from Scotland

- Type: Scottish Dry gin Botanical Vodka
- Manufacturer: Distil PLC
- Origin: Inverkip, Scotland
- Introduced: 2003
- Alcohol by volume: 40.0% (Vintage Gin); 60.0% (Navy Strength Gin); 40.0% (Botanical Vodka)
- Website: blackwoodsgin.co.uk

Blackwoods is an authentic Scottish Gin and Vodka that is made at the Blackwoods’ Brand Home in Inverkip, Scotland.

Originating in Shetland in 2003, the Blackwoods brand name was sold on to Blavod Spirits (now Distil PLC), who further developed the range as a standalone gin and botanical vodka brand.

Production of the gin move to Blackwoods' Brand Home on the Ardgowan Estate in 2024 with the Brand Home opening to the public in February 2026.

== History ==
The company began as part of a project to build a proposed malt whisky distillery on Shetland. The company founder, Caroline Whitfield, started the company after moving to Shetland in 2002. Whitfield had previously worked for Diageo and Unilever. The first iteration of the company was known as 'Blackwood Distillers', named after Whitfield's husband.

Initially, the whisky distillery was proposed for a location at Catfirth, near South Nesting. However, in April 2006, Blackwood announced alternative plans to convert part of the disused RAF Saxa Vord base on Unst to distillery usage. The initial funding was raised from 135 private investors. The construction on Unst would never be completed, and the site would later become Saxa Vord distillery. The gins from this time period were contract distilled in London.

In May 2008, the company went into administration, but a new company, Catfirth Ltd, was established to continue the whisky business and took over the remaining stocks of whisky. The stocks of the vodka and gin brands were sold to a company called Blavod Extreme Spirits (who would become Distil PLC in 2014), and the original company was forced into liquidation. In 2013, word of further funding was suggested, with the company promising that a distillery would open soon after but by 2015 no further work had been done on the site.

Since the sale, the brand continued to perform well, and by 2015 it was the 9th most valuable Scottish gin by sales value.

In 2021, Distil made a £3 million investment in the Ardgowan Distillery, and as part of the deal, was given the space on their site in Inverkip, Scotland, to develop the Blackwoods brand home.

Later that year, Distil PLC announced a share placing in order to raise £755,000 which would later be used to construct the Brand Home for Blackwoods

== Products ==
The company released its first Blackwoods products (then spelled 'Blackwood's') in May 2003: a gin, a vodka, and a cream liqueur named for Tom Jago, one of the team who created Baileys Irish Cream.

An early release, Blackwoods Vintage Gin, was notable for its claim to being the first gin to be released with a vintage attached. The expression was released in limited quantities each year, and the company claimed that the changes in vegetation in Shetland led to annual variations in taste. Blackwoods 60, another early product, was released at 60% abv

Blackwoods range currently includes a 2021 version of the Vintage Gin, a Navy Strength gin at 60% abv (succeeding Blackwoods 60), and a vodka distilled using botanicals. The range also includes a limited release, First Drop, the first release from the still in Inverkip

Production of Blackwoods Gin and Vodka moved to the Blackwoods Brand Home on the Ardgowan Estate in 2024; the distillery operates a 1000 litre gin still named Marie, named after a local woman who was executed for witchcraft in 1662. The first product to be made at Blackwoods in Inverkip was a limited edition release called 'First Drop'

== Blackwoods Brand Home ==
Opening to the public on 12 February 2026, the Blackwoods' Brand Home is housed in a renovated stable building neighbouring Ardgowan Distillery located on the historic Ardgowan Estate on the West coast of Scotland. The renovation of the site has remained sympathetic to the building's history and location, while ensuring the Blackwoods brand is communicated at every touchpoint, with interiors by Studio Percale.

The building boasts a traditional slate roof, original stone entrance arch, characterful concrete floors, and rustic dark woods.. This is balanced with plush banquette seating of the drinks lounge, bespoke-crafted dressers in the aperitif lounge and shop, and a ‘show-stopping’ granite-topped bar. There are also plans to set up an outdoor gin bar this summer.

The brand home offers a range of tours and tastings, as well as cocktail masterclasses and the site’s gin school, which will offer visitors the opportunity to distil and hand-label their own bottle of gin.

The brand home can also be hired as an exclusive event space.

== Visiting the distillery ==
Nestled in the stables of Bankfoot Farm on the Ardgowan Estate on Scotland’s West Coast, Blackwoods Distillery is a 25 minute walk from Inverkip station, 40 minute drive from Glasgow Airport and 15 minute drive from Greenock Cruise Terminal.
