= John Blackwood (footballer, born 1935) =

Scottish footballer

Personal information
- Full name: John Syme Duncan Blackwood
- Date of birth: 25 January 1935 (age 91)
- Place of birth: Cronberry, Scotland
- Position: Inside forward

Senior career*
Years	Team	Apps	(Gls)
- Girvan
1958–1959	Accrington Stanley	4	(1)
1959–1960	York City	0	(0)
- * Club domestic league appearances and goals

John Syme Duncan Blackwood (born 25 January 1935) is a Scottish retired professional footballer who played as an inside forward in the Football League.
