= Pang Sida National Park =

National park in Thailand

- อุทยานแห่งชาติปางสีดา
- IUCN category II (national park)
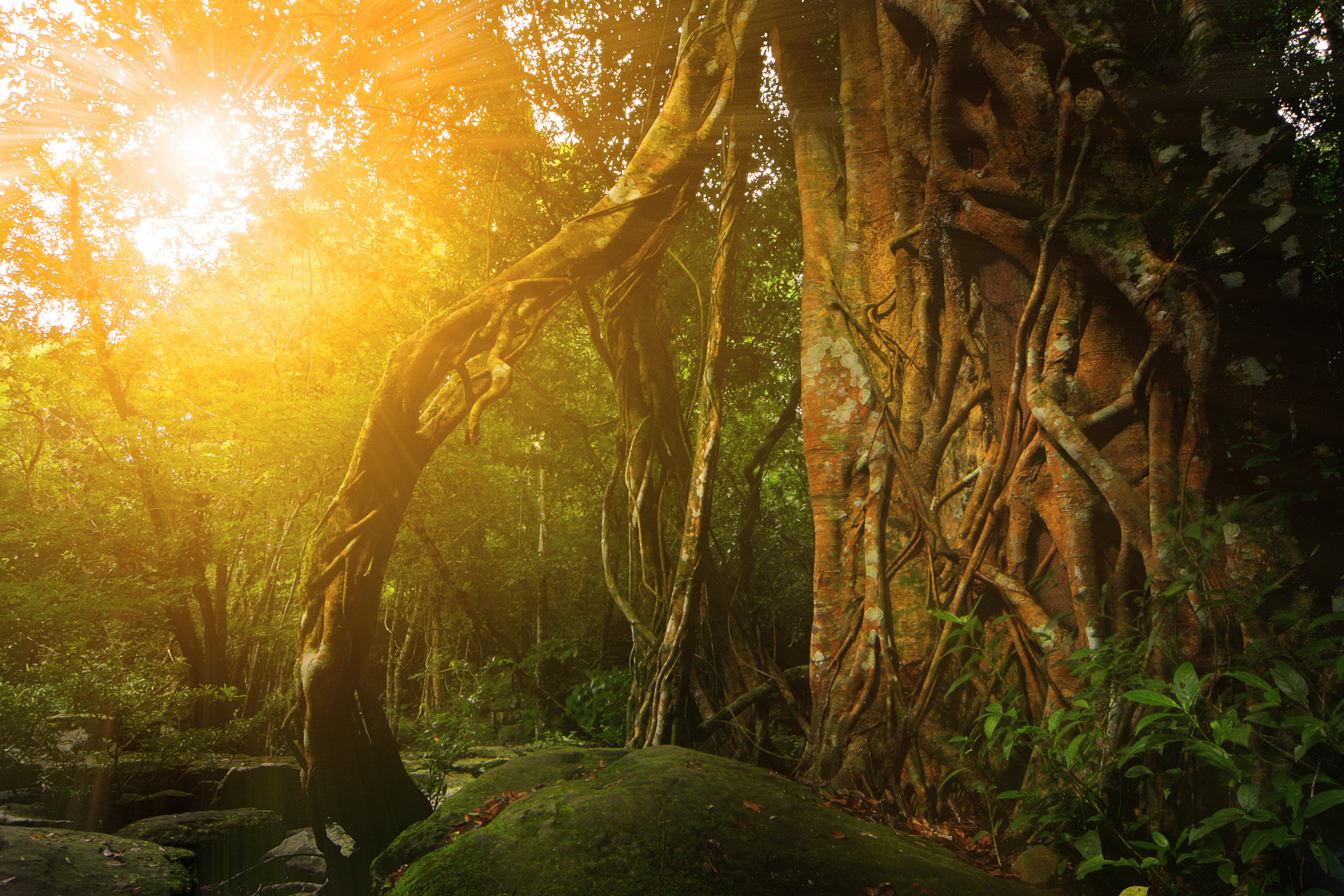

- Location within Thailand
- Location: Sakaeo Province
- Nearest city: Sa Kaeo
- Coordinates: 14°05′N 102°16′E
- Area: 844 km^{2} (326 sq mi)
- Established: 1982
- Visitors: 58,382 (in 2019)
- Governing body: Department of National Parks, Wildlife and Plant Conservation (DNP)

Pang Sida National Park (Thai: อุทยานแห่งชาติปางสีดา, RTGS: Utthayan Haeng Chat Pang Sida, pronounced [ʔùt.tʰā.jāːn hɛ̀ŋ t͡ɕʰâːt pāːŋ sǐː.dāː]) is a national park in the Sankamphaeng Range, covering 527,500 rai ~ 844 square kilometres (326 sq mi) in the eastern Thai province of Sa Kaeo. It is 28 kilometres north of Sa Kaeo City, the capital of the province. Together with Khao Yai National Park, Thap Lan National Park, Ta Phraya National Park and the Dong Yai Wildlife Sanctuary, it constitutes a part of the Dong Phayayen–Khao Yai Forest Complex UNESCO World Heritage Site, covering a total of around 6,100 square kilometers. One of the highlights of the park is Pang Sida waterfall.

== Ecology ==
From information collected in 2000 the park is home to a total of 271 species of vertebrate: 81 mammals, 143 species of birds (131 resident), 19 species of reptiles, 16 amphibian species and 19 species of freshwater fish.

The critically endangered Siamese crocodile Crocodylus siamensis is reported to live in the park, along with the Asian elephant, gaur, dhole (the IUCN estimates fewer than 2,500 adults of this wild dog worldwide), leopard, Malayan sun bear, Asiatic black bear and white-handed gibbon. More common animals include the pig-tailed macaque, Sambar deer, barking deer and wild pig. Two notable endangered birds are the grey heron and purple heron, Ardea cinerea and A. purpurea.

The park area is also home to many species of butterfly. Within two kilometres of the entrance is a butterfly area where hundreds of butterflies congregate in certain seasons. In the interests of patron safety, as well as conservation, a controlled gate is located just past this area, and visitors are asked to consult at the visitor's centre for a guide to go further afield.

Approximately 6 kilometres further one can stop and travel by foot to the Gaur grassland, where a wildlife tower is located for observation. 25 kilometres from the entrance is a viewpoint for viewing the park.

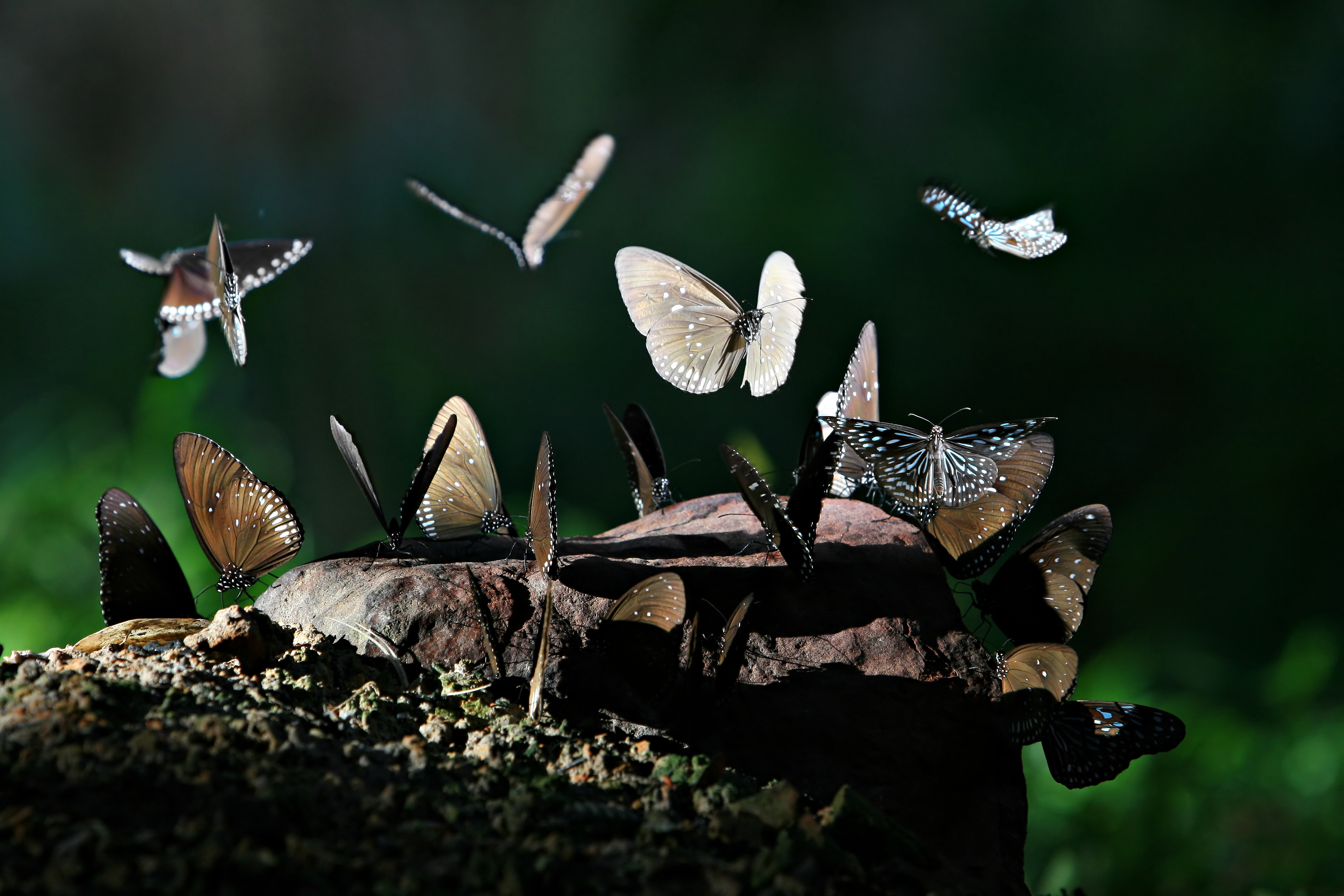
Butterflies in Pang Sida National Park

== Camping and accommodation ==
From Sa Kaeo it is possible to hire a tuk-tuk or take one of the local buses. Foreigners are charged 200 baht at the entrance gate. In the entrance area is a restaurant, campground, and visitor's centre.

There are two main campsites, one near the entrance and one approximately 20 kilometres along the main road, close to the viewpoint. It is possible to rent tents from the visitor's centre. In addition, there are a number of guesthouses near the entrance that are available for accommodation.

== Location ==
Pang Sida National Park in overview PARO 1 (Prachinburi)

2) Pang Sida National Park in overview PARO 1 (Prachinburi)

	National park
1	Khao Yai
2	Pang Sida
3	Ta Phraya
4	Thap Lan

== See also ==
- List of national parks of Thailand
- DNP - Pang Sida National Park
- List of Protected Areas Regional Offices of Thailand
