= USS Austin (DE-15) =

Evarts-class destroyer escort

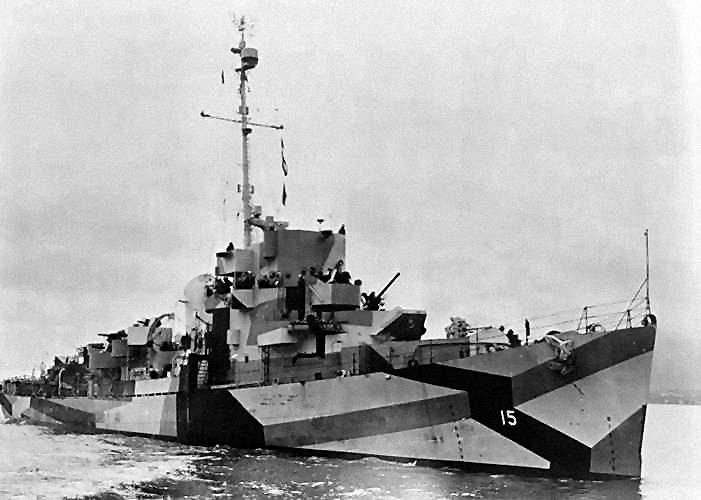
- USS Austin (DE-15), circa in 1944

History

United States
- Name: USS Austin
- Namesake: John Arnold Austin
- Builder: Mare Island Navy Yard
- Laid down: 14 March 1942
- Launched: 25 September 1942
- Commissioned: 13 February 1943
- Decommissioned: 21 December 1945
- Stricken: 8 January 1946
- Fate: Scrapped by the Terminal Island Naval Shipyard, 9 January 1947

General characteristics
- Type: Evarts-class destroyer escort
- Displacement: 1,140 long tons (1,158 t) standard; 1,430 long tons (1,453 t) full
- Length: 289 ft 5 in (88.21 m) o/a; 283 ft 6 in (86.41 m) w/l
- Beam: 35 ft 2 in (10.72 m)
- Draft: 11 ft (3.4 m) (max)
- Propulsion: 4 × General Motors Model 16-278A diesel engines with electric drive, 6,000 shp (4,474 kW); 2 screws
- Speed: 21 knots (39 km/h; 24 mph)
- Range: 4,150 nmi (7,690 km)
- Complement: 15 officers and 183 enlisted
- Armament: 3 × single 3"/50 Mk.22 dual purpose guns; 1 × quad 1.1"/75 Mk.2 AA gun; 9 × 20 mm Mk.4 AA guns; 1 × Hedgehog Projector Mk.10 (144 rounds); 8 × Mk.6 depth charge projectors; 2 × Mk.9 depth charge tracks

USS Austin (DE-15), was an Evarts-class destroyer escort of the United States Navy during World War II.

== Design ==
The Evarts-class destroyer escorts were 289 ft 5 in (88.21 m) long overall, and they had a beam of 35 ft 2 in (10.72 m). They had an average draft of 10 ft 1 in (3.07 m) at their full load displacement of 1,416 long tons (1,439 t). Each ship had a normal crew numbered 156 officers and sailors.

Austin was propelled by a pair of diesel motors manufactured by General Motors, which drove a pair of screw propellers. Her propulsion system was rated to produce 6,000 brake horsepower (4,500 kW) for a top speed of 19.5 knots (36.1 km/h; 22.4 mph). Oil storage amounted to between 131 and 197 long tons (133 and 200 t), which allowed a cruising radius of up to 6,000 nautical miles (11,000 km; 6,900 mi) at an economical pace of 10 knots (19 km/h; 12 mph).

The ship's armament consisted of a main battery of three 3-inch (76 mm) /50-caliber guns in individual pivot mounts, which could be used against air or surface targets. These were supported by a light anti-aircraft battery that initially consisted of four 1.1 in (28 mm) /75-caliber guns in a quadruple mount and nine 20 mm (0.79 in) Oerlikon guns. For attacks against submarines, the ship was equipped with a Hedgehog mortar, eight depth charge throwers, and two depth charge racks.

== Construction ==
The second Austin (DE-15) was laid down on 14 March 1942 at the Mare Island Navy Yard as HMS Blackwood (BDE-15) for the United Kingdom under the terms of the Lend-Lease Agreement; launched on 25 September 1942: sponsored by Mrs. W. C. Springer; taken over by the United States Navy on 25 January 1943 and redesignated DE-15; and commissioned on 13 February 1943. The destroyer escort was apparently commissioned as simply DE-15 for the name Austin was not assigned to her until 19 February 1943, six days after she went into commission. The ship was named for Chief Carpenter John Arnold Austin (1905-1941) who was killed in action on board USS Oklahoma during the attack on Pearl Harbor by Japanese forces on 7 December 1941, and was posthumously awarded the Navy Cross.

== Service history ==
Assigned to Escort Division (CortDiv) 14, the ship conducted shakedown training out of San Diego between 23 March and 23 April 1943. On the latter day, she put to sea to escort a convoy to Cold Bay, Alaska. She returned to San Diego on 11 May and began convoy escort missions between the West Coast and the Hawaiian Islands. Between mid-May and early September, Austin made two round-trip voyages between San Diego and Oahu and then a single, one-way run from the West Coast back to Pearl Harbor. On 2 September the ship left Pearl Harbor for the Aleutian Islands; and, on 14 September, joined the Alaskan Sea Frontier. For just over one year, Austin plied the cold waters of the North Pacific escorting ships between Alaskan ports, conducting patrols, performing weather ship duties, and serving as a homing point for aircraft.

The warship departed Alaska on 23 September 1944; arrived in San Francisco, California, a week later, and received a regular overhaul which lasted until 17 November. On 3 December, she once more weighed anchor for Hawaii. Austin operated out of Pearl Harbor as a training ship with the Pacific Fleet Submarine Training Command until 20 March 1945, when she set out for the Central Pacific. On 1 April, the destroyer escort reported for duty with forces assigned to the Commander, Forward Areas, and, for a little more than two months, conducted anti-submarine patrols and air-sea rescue missions out of Ulithi Atoll in the Western Caroline Islands. She finished that assignment on 10 June when the ship left for the Mariana Islands. For the next four months, Austin operated out of Guam and Saipan. In addition to anti-submarine patrols and air/sea rescue missions, she escorted convoys to such places as Iwo Jima, Eniwetok and Okinawa. Following the cessation of hostilities in mid-August, she conducted search missions in the northern Marianas for enemy holdouts and for survivors of downed B-29 Superfortresses. The warship also patrolled Truk Atoll briefly before occupation forces arrived there in strength.

On 12 October, she departed Guam in company with the other ships of CortDiv 14, bound for San Pedro, California, and inactivation. On 17 November, she reported to the Commander, Western Sea Frontier, to prepare for decommissioning and, on 21 December 1945, was placed out of commission at Terminal Island Naval Shipyard. Austin was berthed with the Pacific Reserve Fleet until scrapped. On 8 January 1946, her name was struck from the Naval Vessel Register. The Terminal Island Naval Shipyard completed scrapping her on 9 January 1947.

== Awards ==
- American Campaign Medal
- Asiatic-Pacific Campaign Medal
- World War II Victory Medal
