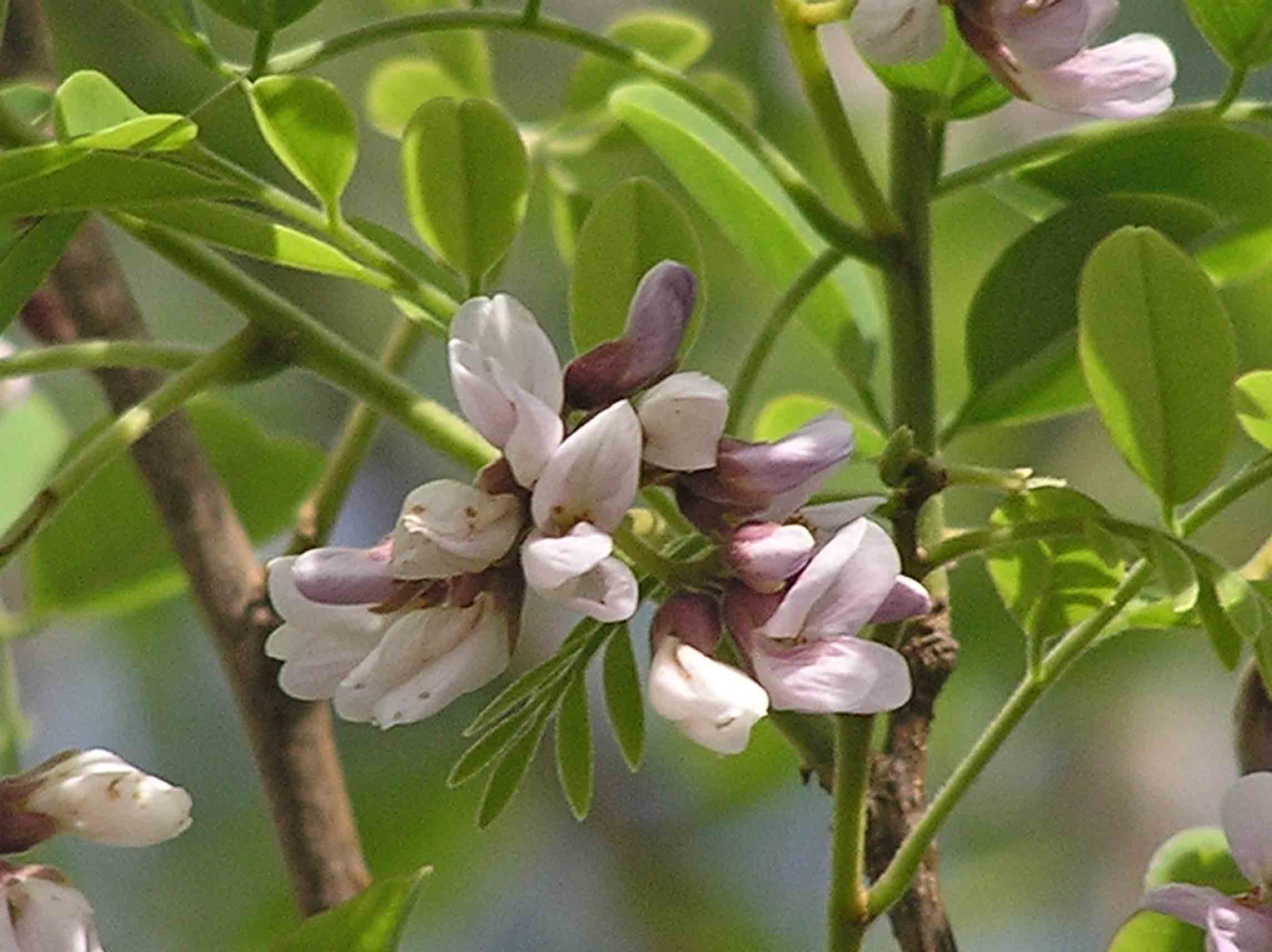

Conservation status
- Endangered (IUCN 2.3)

Scientific classification
- Kingdom: Plantae
- Clade: Tracheophytes
- Clade: Angiosperms
- Clade: Eudicots
- Clade: Rosids
- Order: Fabales
- Family: Fabaceae
- Subfamily: Faboideae
- Genus: Dalbergia
- Species: D. oliveri

Binomial name
- Dalbergia oliveri Gamble ex Prain

Synonyms
- Amerimnon bariense Pierre; Amerimnon dongnaiense Pierre; Amerimnon duperreanum Pierre; Amerimnon mammosum Pierre; Dalbergia bariensis Pierre; Dalbergia dongnaiensis Pierre; Dalbergia duperreana Pierre; Dalbergia laccifera Laness.; Dalbergia mammosa Pierre

= Dalbergia oliveri =

Species of legume

Dalbergia oliveri is a species of legume in the family Fabaceae which grows in tree form to 15 – 30 meters in height (up to 100 ft.). The fruit is a green pod containing one to two seeds which turn brown to black when ripe. It is threatened by habitat loss and over-harvesting for its valuable red "rosewood" timber.

Scientists at the University of Oxford published the transcriptomes of various Dalbergia spp. samples, and found that a number were synonymous with D. oliveri. It was found that D. oliveri had more R genes than the co-occurring Dalbergia cochinchinensis.

== Distribution naming and synonyms ==
The species is native to Arunachal Pradesh, Myanmar, Thailand, Peninsular Malaysia, Laos, Cambodia, and Vietnam. Common names in S.E. Asia are: Cambodian: "Neang Nuon", Thai: "Mai Ching Chan" (ไม้ชิงชัน), Laos: "Mai Kham Phii" (ໄມ້ຄຳພີ), Myanmar: "tamalan" (တမလန်း).

In Vietnamese cẩm lai or trắc lai is a generic name for "rosewood" trees. Based at the Saigon Botanic Gardens, the French botanist JBL Pierre described a number of local variations in tree dimensions and characteristics of seed pods (which are usually glabrous). Species he named are now considered to be synonyms:

- Dalbergia bariensis: cẩm lai bông, cẩm lai Bà Rịa – 15-20 m trees – pods 25 x 120mm, usually 1 seeded
- Dalbergia dongnaiensis: cẩm lai Ðồng Nai – 10-15 m trees – pods 30-45 x 100-110mm, 1 seed
- Dalbergia duperreana: trắc (Cambodia) – 10-20 m trees – pods 27-40 x 120mm
- Dalbergia mammosa: cẩm lai vú - 20 m trees – pods 22 x 100mm, not narrowing on 1-2 seeds
- Dalbergia olivieri: cẩm lai bông - 25 m trees – pods 17 x 60-80mm, 1 or 2 (rarely 3) seeds

== Uses ==
The wood of this rosewood-family tree is valuable for ornamental work including Woodturning and furniture. The sapwood is yellowish-white with dark brown heartwood. The heartwood is very hard and heavy. The lumber is sold under the names Burmese rosewood, Laos rosewood, and Asian rosewood.

In contrast to the co-occurring Dalbergia cochinchinensis, Dalbergia oliveri avoids drought by chlorophyll content and compromise productivity. Its isohydric behaviour suggests it is suitable to be grown in deciduous forests.

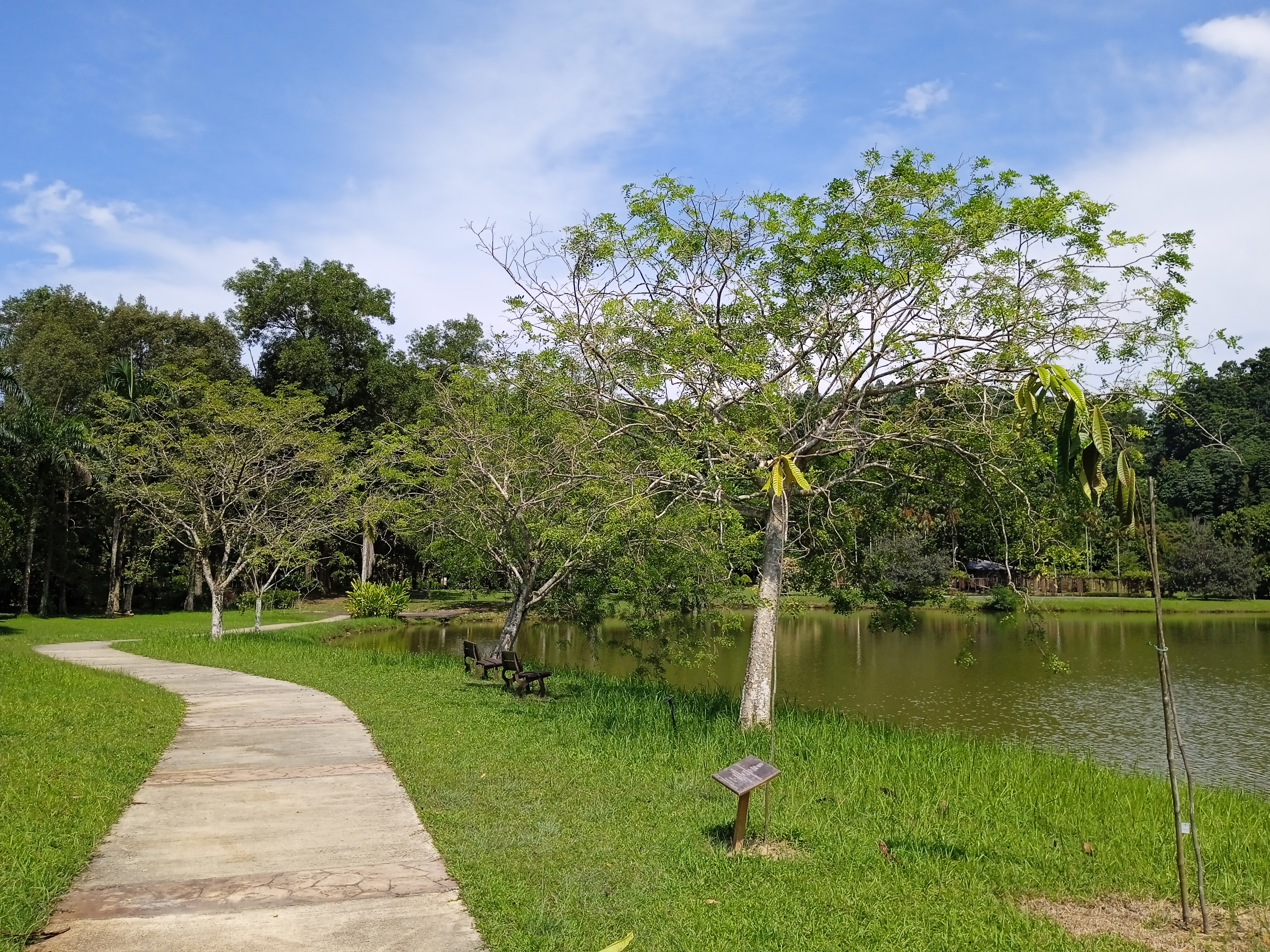
Tree

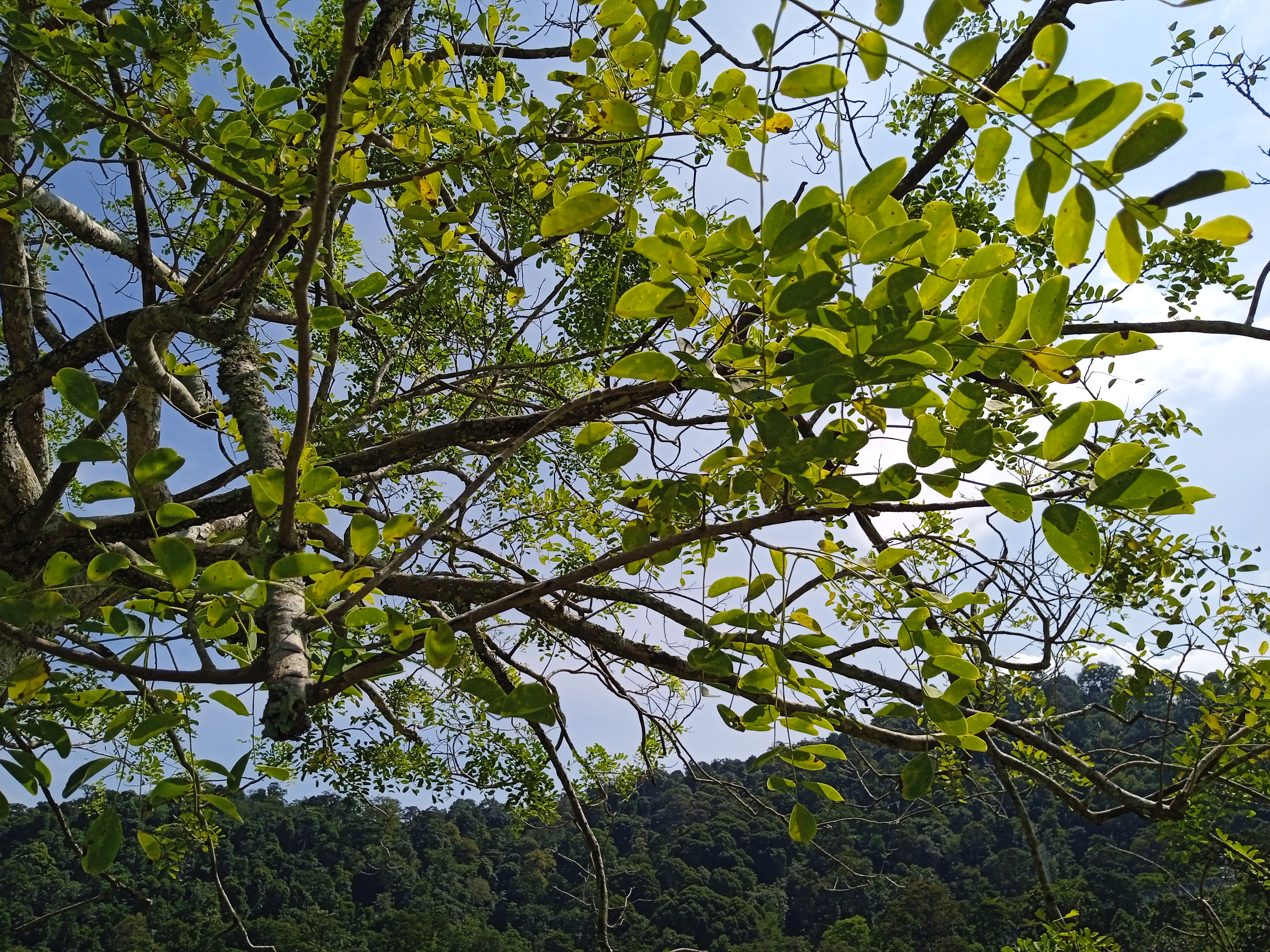
Leaf

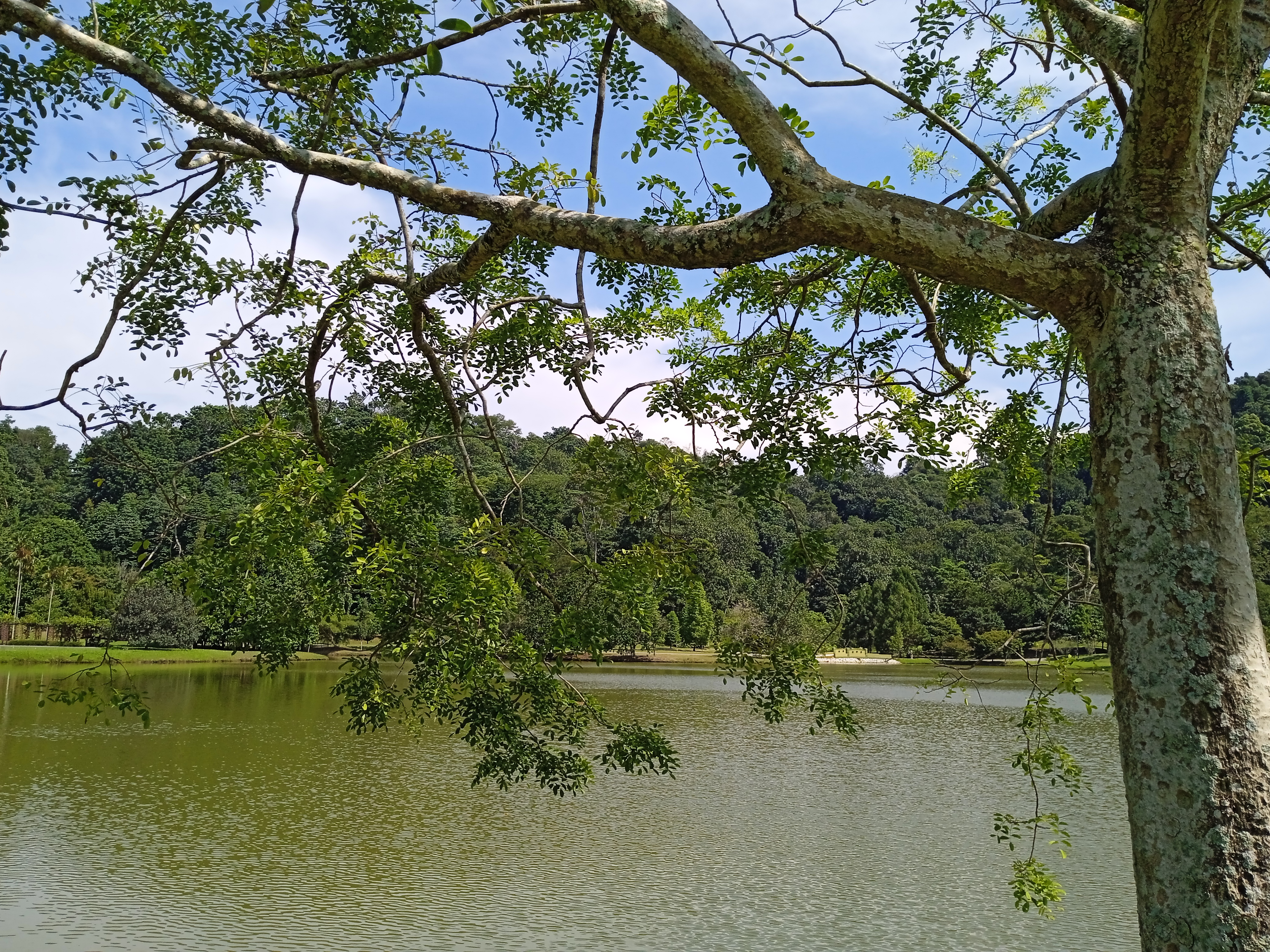
Bark
