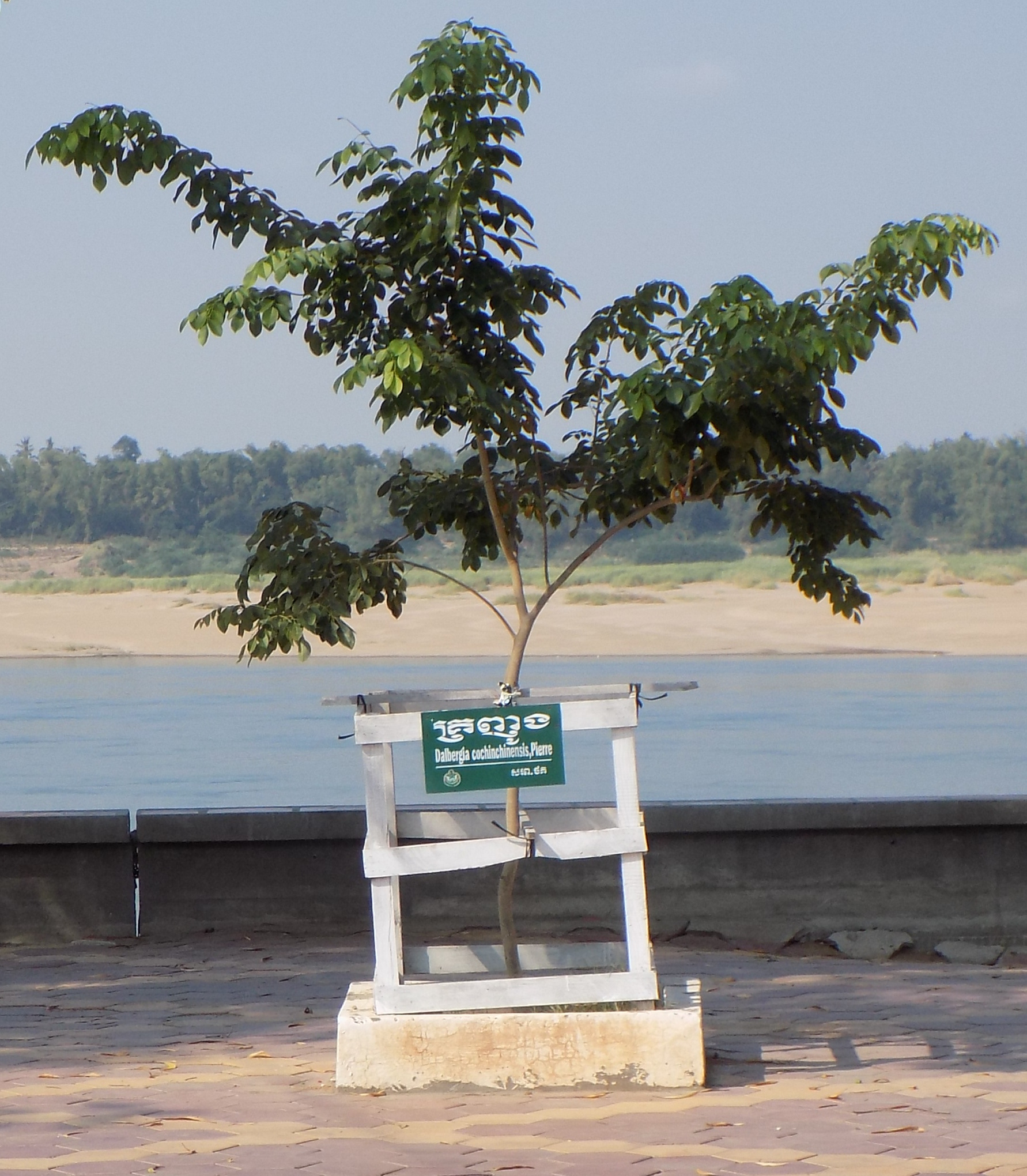

Conservation status
- Critically Endangered (IUCN 3.1)

Scientific classification
- Kingdom: Plantae
- Clade: Tracheophytes
- Clade: Angiosperms
- Clade: Eudicots
- Clade: Rosids
- Order: Fabales
- Family: Fabaceae
- Subfamily: Faboideae
- Genus: Dalbergia
- Species: D. cochinchinensis

Binomial name
- Dalbergia cochinchinensis Pierre ex Laness.

Synonyms
- Amerimnon cambodianum Pierre; Amerimnon cochinchinense Pierre; Amerimnon fuscum Pierre; Dalbergia cambodiana Pierre; Dalbergia cochinchinensis Laness.; Dalbergia fusca var. enneandra S.Q.Zou & J.H.Liu

= Dalbergia cochinchinensis =

Species of legume

Dalbergia cochinchinensis, the Thailand rosewood, Siamese rosewood, or tracwood, (Thai: พะยูง: Phayung; Vietnamese: Trắc (or Cẩm lai nam bộ); Khmer: ក្រញូង: Kranhung; Lao: ກະຍູງ: Kayung; Chinese: 酸枝木: Suān zhī mù ) is a species of legume in the family Fabaceae.

It is a tree yielding valuable hardwood found in Cambodia, Laos, Thailand, and Vietnam. In 2022 its status was re-evaluated as Critically Endangered caused by illegal logging and smuggling. Conservationists project that the species could be extinct within 10 years (by 2026).

Due to its pioneering characteristics, drought tolerance, and nitrogen-fixing ability, it shows potential for restoring degraded forests and deforested sites. Therefore, sustainable plantation of the tree can serve both goals of conservation and forest landscape restoration.

University of Oxford published the transcriptomes of Dalbergia cochinchinensis and five other Dalbergia spp. It was found that D. cochinchinensis had fewer R genes than the co-occurring Dalbergia oliveri.

== Demand side: China ==
The demand for furniture made from Siamese rosewood, chiefly in China where it is known as Hongmu, has led to an epidemic of illegal logging and trafficking, threatening the species with extinction and resulting in a war with poachers. In 2015 seven Thai forest rangers were killed trying to shut down illegal Siamese rosewood logging.

According to the Environmental Investigation Agency, "Rosewood prices started to spike with the increase in Chinese millionaires and the lead-up to the 2008 Beijing Olympics. In 2011, EIA investigators witnessed a rosewood bed for sale in China for one million dollars. Since then black market prices have rocketed, making Siam rosewood more valuable than gold."

Siamese rosewood is denser than water, fine grained, and high in oils and resins. These properties make them dimensional stable, hard wearing, rot and insect resistant, and when new, highly fragrant. The density and toughness of the wood also allows furniture to be built without the use of glue and nails, but rather constructed from joinery and doweling alone.

== Supply side: illegal logging ==
Although officially protected, trees of these species are subject to illegal logging in the Phu Phan and the Dangrek Mountains. The logs cut on the Cambodian side are usually smuggled into Thailand. Being highly valued in the wood carving and furniture industry, Phayung logs easily find a market.

Thailand has urged neighboring countries and China to tighten regulations to curb the illegal Siamese rosewood timber trade. Prasert Sornsathapornkul, director of the Natural World Heritage Office at the Department of National Parks, Wildlife and Plant Conservation, said demand in China for the protected Siamese rosewood is on the rise, leading to illegal logging in Thailand. Sornsathapornkul noted that logging licences issued by Cambodia, Laos, and Vietnam make it difficult to determine if the wood originated in those countries or in Thailand. Thai authorities have voiced concern the timber might be shipped from Thailand to neighboring countries to be legalized. He Jinxing, programme officer of the CITES Management Authority of China, said: "We import the Phayung logs from Cambodia, Laos and Vietnam with legal licences under CITES regulations." China has voiced concern that the enforcement of regulations under the Convention on International Trade in Endangered Species (CITES) will affect supply to its markets.

Thailand is moving to legalize the planting and harvesting of valuable trees such as teak and Siamese rosewood on private land. The Cabinet approved an amendment to the Forest Act in 2018 to make this possible. Heretofore, these trees could not be felled even if they were growing on private land. Owners could then grow commercial crops of the trees for sustainable harvest. It was hoped that this would decrease illegal logging.

However, by 2022, assessment indicated that unsustainable harvesting, including illegal logging and smuggling, had continued and brought D. cochinchinensis to a critically endangered status.

== See also ==
- Dalbergia tonkinensis
