= Khun Phawo National Park =

National park in Thailand

- อุทยานแห่งชาติขุนพะวอ
- IUCN category II (national park)
- Location within Thailand
- Location: Tak Province, Thailand
- Nearest city: Tak
- Coordinates: 17°2′18.676″N 98°37′39.799″E
- Area: 397 km^{2} (153 sq mi)
- Established: 2009
- Visitors: 10,307 (in 2019)
- Governing body: Department of National Parks, Wildlife and Plant Conservation

Khun Phawo National Park (Thai: อุทยานแห่งชาติขุนพะวอ) is a national park in the Mae Ramat District, Tak Province, Thailand.

== Geography ==
The national park, with an area of 247,957 rai ~ 397 square kilometres (153 sq mi) consists of mountains of 350–905 metres elevation. The park is the source of many streams, including Huai Mae La-mao, Huai Mae Charao, Huai Phrawo, Huai Mae Kasa, Huai Mae Kit Luang, Huai Pha-so, Huai Sa-muen Luang, Huai Samae, and Huai Mae Ra-mat, which flow into the agricultural areas of Mae Sot District and Mae Ramat District in Tak Province.

== History ==
The park was originally called "Mae Kasa National Park" and was later changed into "Khun Phra Wo National Park" in honour of Phra Wo, a Karen soldier in the Thonburi period. He was appointed as the head of La Mao customs house to defend his nation's independence till his death on the battlefield which was in the area of Khun Phra Wo National Park.

== Climate ==
It is cool and breezy throughout the year at an average temperature of 21 °C. The average highest temperature is 20 °C. The lowest temperature is 8 °C. The average rainfall is 1,676 mm per year.

== Flora and fauna ==
There are various kinds of forests within the area of the national park, including mixed forests, virgin forests, and dense forests. Major plants include Indian mahogany, teaks, Dipterocarpus tuberculatus (pluang), Lithocarpus cantleyanus (kor), Lagerstroemia (tabaek), Terminalia chebula, Afzelia xylocarpa, ebony, Millettia pendula (ka-jaw), Terminalia arjuna (rokfa), and Xylia xylocarpa (redwood plants).

Wild animals found in the park include Muntiacus Muntjak, wild boars, bears, langur, flying squirrel, gibbons, cobra, king cobra, rabbits, squirrels, tree shrews, red junglefowls, and Asiatic golden cats.

== Sights ==
- Namtok Khun Phawo (น้ำตกขุนพะวอ) A large waterfall around 100 m high and an origin of Huai Mae Charao (Mae Charao Creek).
- Huai Mae Lamao (ห้วยแม่ละเมา) This large creek is in an unspoiled forest, offering whitewater rafting on rubber dinghies.
- Nature Trail (เส้นทางเดินศึกษาธรรมชาติ) The walking path goes up and down the fairly steep hills, and passes along the river upstream and a small waterfall. During the period of change from the rainy to cool season, colourful wild flowers can be seen. The greenery is dotted with strikingly red Krathue (Boesenbergia prainiana) and yellow Mexican sunflowers.
- Namtok Pha Thewa (น้ำตกผาเทวะ) It is on the nature trail and the most remarkable waterfall of the park. With a height of 150 m, the powerful flow falls against boulders and the pool below. In the woods, there is a pagoda containing cremated bones of a heartbroken woman who hung herself.
- Tham Mae Usu (ถ้ำแม่อุสุ) This cave is around 12 km from the Tha Song Yang District Office to the north. To the west, there is a gigantic hollow rock. In the afternoon, rays of sunlight illuminate the cave.
- Namtok Thung Nang Khruan (น้ำตกทุ่งนางครวญ) A medium-size waterfall with small layers of flowing water amid a shady forest. It receives water from a canal beside rice fields.

== Location ==
Khun Phawo National Park in overview PARO 14 (Tak)

2) Khun Phawo National Park in overview PARO 14 (Tak)

	National park
1	Doi Soi Malai
2	Khun Phawo
3	Lan Sang
4	Mae Moei
5	Namtok Pha Charoen
6	Ramkhamhaeng
7	Si Satchanalai
8	Taksin Maharat

	Wildlife sanctuary
9	Mae Tuen
10	Tham Chao Ram
11	Thung Yai Naresuan East
12	Umphang
	Non-hunting area
13	Tham Chao Ram

	Forest park
14	Namtok Pa La Tha
15	Phra Tat Huai Luek
16	Tham Lom–Tham Wang
17	Tham Ta Kho Bi

== See also ==
- List of national parks of Thailand
- DNP - Khun Phawo National Park
- List of Protected Areas Regional Offices of Thailand
