= Namtok Pha Charoen National Park =

National park in Thailand

- อุทยานแห่งชาติน้ำตกพาเจริญ
- IUCN category II (national park)
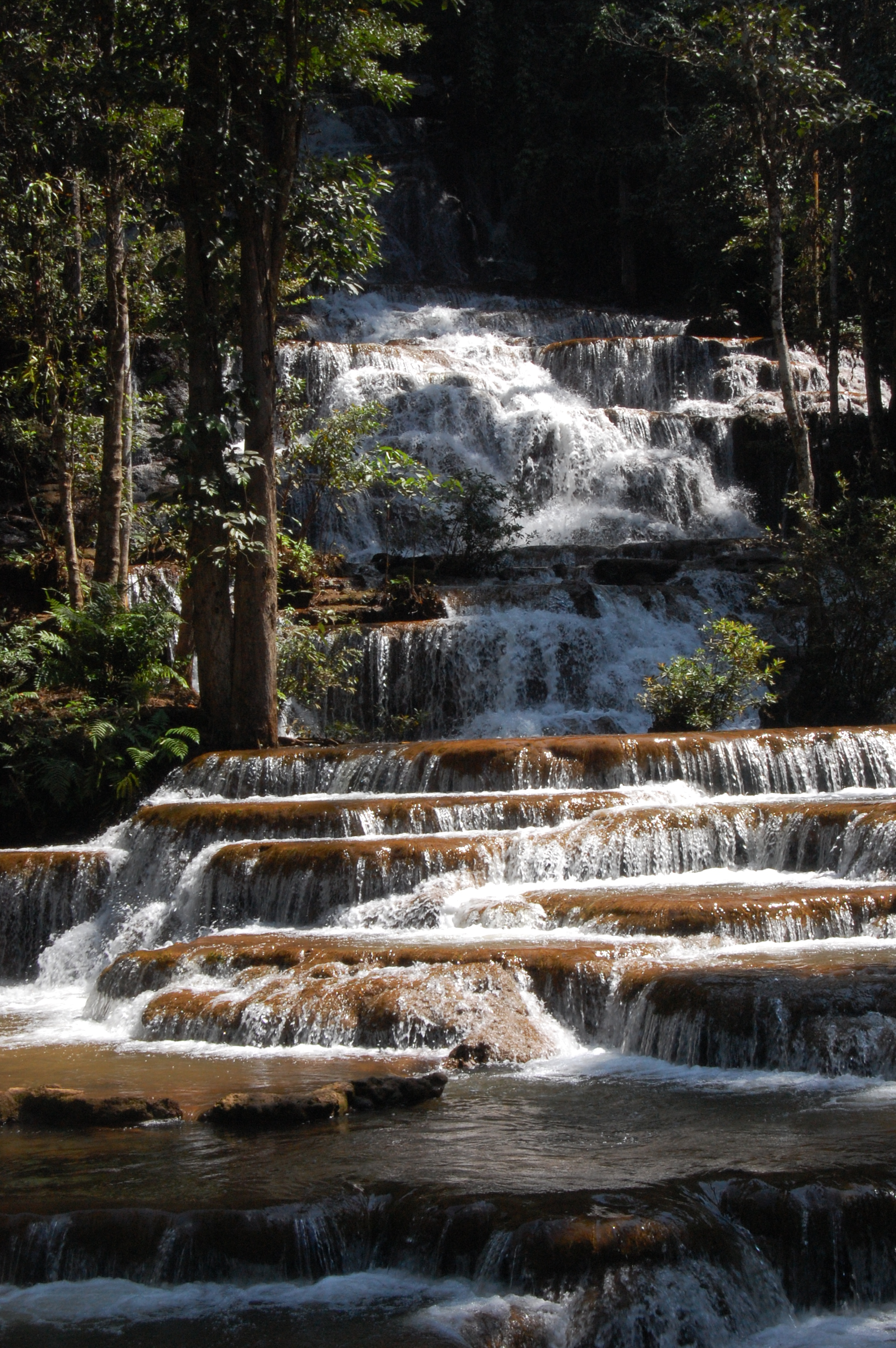
- Namtok Pha Charoen

- Location within Thailand
- Location: Tak Province, Thailand
- Nearest city: Tak
- Coordinates: 16°30′28.879″N 98°42′11.105″E
- Area: 770 km^{2} (300 sq mi)
- Visitors: 152,539 (in 2019)
- Governing body: Department of National Parks, Wildlife and Plant Conservation

Namtok Pha Charoen National Park (Thai: อุทยานแห่งชาติน้ำตกพาเจริญ) is a national park in the Phop Phra District, Tak Province, Thailand. Most of its area is high complex mountains of 1,765 m elevation and features a mixed deciduous forest and a coniferous forest.

== Geography ==
Namtok Pha Charoen National Park is 30 km southeast of Mae Sot and 57 km southwest of Tak town. The park's area is 481,550 rai ~ 770 square kilometres (300 sq mi).

== Climate ==
As the area of the national park is affected by the southwestern monsoon, its weather is cool and can be divided into three seasons: summer (March–May), when the weather is not extremely hot because of the altitude and breezy condition of the area; the rainy season (June–October), when there are heavy and continuous rains throughout; and winter (November–February) when the weather is not much cold with the lowest temperature of 6°C. Rainfall in the park is between 1,500-2,000 mm per year.

== Flora and fauna ==
The area has many deciduous trees, pine forest and curcuma (Siam tulip), which is a flower with big bright orange coloured petals. It blooms during July to October every year at the natural park office area.

Wild animals found in the national park include gaur, deer, Muntiacus Muntjak, birds, Indochinese tigers, wild boars, red junglefowls, pheasants, snakes, porcupines, masked palm civets, gibbons, monkeys, mouse deer, and wolves.

== Sights ==
- Namtok Pha Charoen (น้ำตกพาเจริญ) A limestone waterfall receiving water from a creek that flows into a pool of water. This ninety-seven-tiered waterfall flows year round.
- Bo Nam Ron Huai Nam Nak (บ่อน้ำร้อนห้วยน้ำนัก) The water in this natural hot well measures 60˚C. There are gazebos provided by the Phop Phra District administration next to the well at its side on the Ro Pho Cho Road.
- Doi Kia Viewpoint (จุดชมวิวดอยเกี๊ยะ) This is the highest point of the borderline between Myanmar and Thailand. It is around 512 m high and overlooks a forest in Myanmar.
- Namtok Pa Wai (น้ำตกป่าหวาย) The waterfall originates from Pa Wai Creek where water flows all year round and many rattan plants grow.
- Namtok Sai Fa and Namtok Sai Rung (น้ำตกสายฟ้าและน้ำตกสายรุ้ง) These waterfalls have spray of water which looks like a rainbow when being seen in sunlight.

== Location ==
Namtok Pha Charoen National Park in overview PARO 14 (Tak)

5) Namtok Pha Charoen National Park in overview PARO 14 (Tak)

	National park
1	Doi Soi Malai
2	Khun Phawo
3	Lan Sang
4	Mae Moei
5	Namtok Pha Charoen
6	Ramkhamhaeng
7	Si Satchanalai
8	Taksin Maharat

	Wildlife sanctuary
9	Mae Tuen
10	Tham Chao Ram
11	Thung Yai Naresuan East
12	Umphang
	Non-hunting area
13	Tham Chao Ram

	Forest park
14	Namtok Pa La Tha
15	Phra Tat Huai Luek
16	Tham Lom–Tham Wang
17	Tham Ta Kho Bi

== See also ==
- List of national parks of Thailand
- DNP - Namtok Pha Charoen National Park
- List of Protected Areas Regional Offices of Thailand
