= Ocellularia diospyri =

Scientific classification
- Domain: Eukaryota
- Kingdom: Fungi
- Division: Ascomycota
- Class: Lecanoromycetes
- Order: Graphidales
- Family: Graphidaceae
- Genus: Ocellularia
- Species: O. diospyri

Binomial name
- Ocellularia diospyri Homchant. & Coppins (2002)

Species of lichen

Ocellularia diospyri is a rare species of corticolous (bark-dwelling) lichen in the family Graphidaceae. It is found in northern Thailand.

== Taxonomy ==
The lichen was formally described as a new species in 2002 by lichenologists Natsurang Homchantara and Brian J. Coppins. The type specimen was collected from Ton Krabak Yai National Park (Tak Province) at an elevation of about 500 m (1,600 ft); here, in a mixed forest, it was found growing on the trunk of a Diospyros tree. This genus is alluded to in the specific epithet diospyri. The lichen is only known to occur at the type locality.

== Description ==
Ocellularia diospyri has a smooth, shiny, oliveaceous thallus with a thick cortex. The apothecia occur solitarily and are immersed in the medulla. They have a diameter of 0.6–0.65 mm, with a brown, fused exciple. The columella (the sterile central axis of the apothecia) is carbonized (blackened) and is visible from the small apothecial pore; it measures 0.08–0.2 mm in diameter. The ascospores are thin walled, spindle-shaped, and have from 12 to 23 locules (cavities); they typically measure 102.5–164.5 by 15.0–20.5 μm. This is unusually long for columellate species in the genus Ocellularia. O. diospyri contains the secondary compounds stictic acid and constictic acid.

== See also ==
- List of Ocellularia species
