= Umphang Wildlife Sanctuary =

Wildlife sanctuary in northwestern Thailand

- เขตรักษาพันธุ์สัตว์ป่าอุ้มผาง
- IUCN category Ia (strict nature reserve)
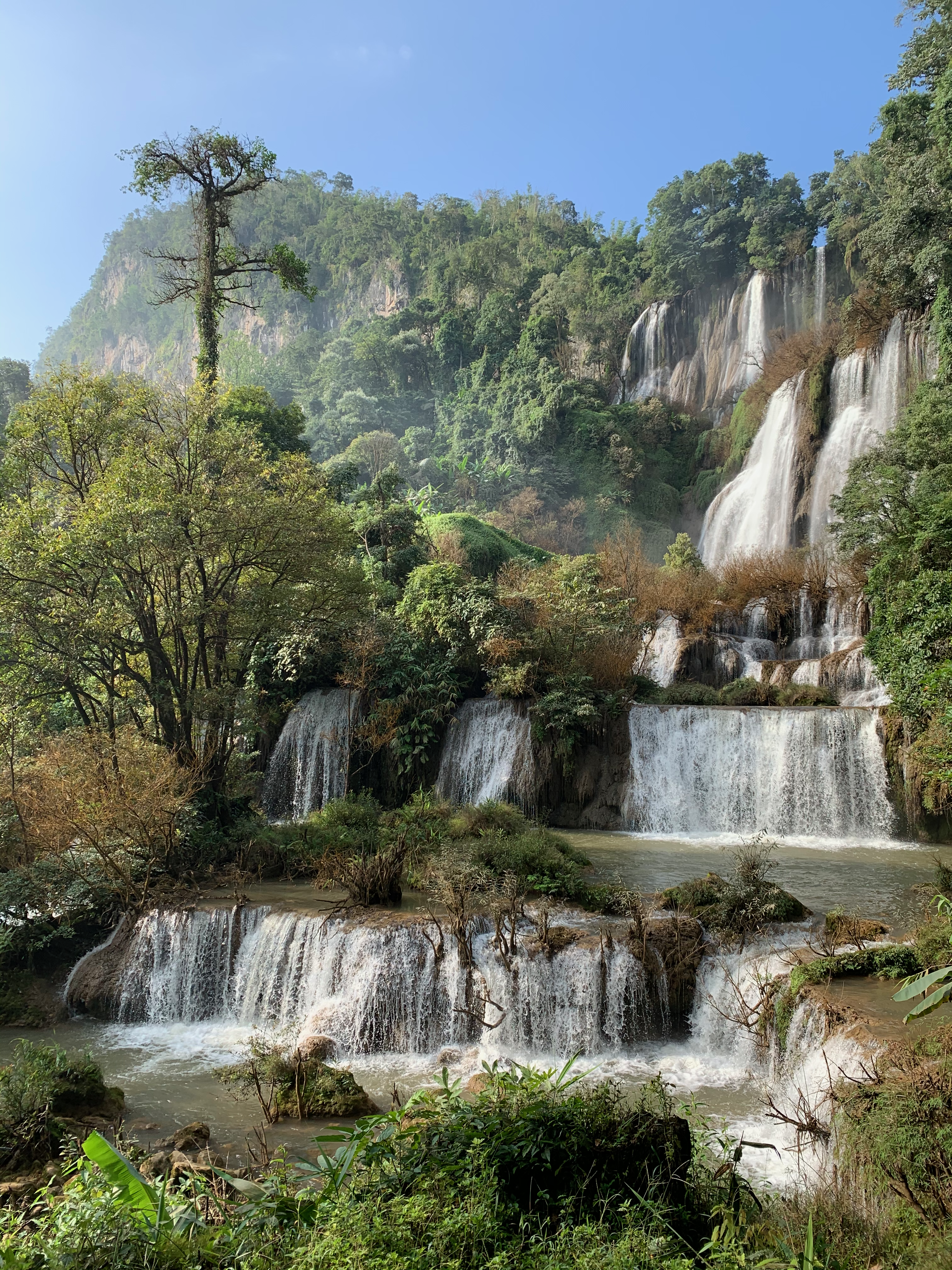
- Thi Lo Su Waterfall in 2020

- Location within Thailand
- Location: Umphang, Tak, Thailand
- Nearest city: Mae Sot
- Coordinates: 15°55′23″N 98°45′28″E
- Area: 2,590 km^{2} (1,000 sq mi)
- Established: 1989
- Governing body: Department of National Parks, Wildlife and Plant Conservation (DNP)

Umphang Wildlife Sanctuary (Thai: เขตรักษาพันธุ์สัตว์ป่าอุ้มผาง) is a wildlife sanctuary in Thailand site in the Umphang District of Tak Province, northwestern Thailand. It was announced as a protected sanctuary in 1989.

It is considered part of the Western Forest Complex. Places adjacent to Umphang Wildlife Sanctuary are (from the north clockwise): Myanmar, Mokro and Phop Phra District in Tak Province, Khlong Wang Chao National Park, Khlong Lan National Park, Mae Wong National Park, and Thung Yai Naresuan Wildlife Sanctuary.

With an abundance of forests, this makes it the watershed of the Mae Klong River (as well as Khwae Yai River) that flows south to the provinces of Kanchanaburi, Ratchaburi and Samut Songkram.

Most of the area is mountainous, so the weather is rather cold and becomes really cold from November to February. It is made up of tropical rain forest and deciduous forest at a height of 80–2,152 meters (262–7,060 ft) above mean sea level.

Frequently spotted fauna, for example, clouded leopard, Malayan tapir, mainland serow, falcon, wreathed hornbill, great hornbill, Oriental darter, Indochinese tiger, Indian elephant, silvery lutung, northern pig-tailed macaque, include species of reptiles and amphibians, such as impressed tortoise, Asian forest tortoise, elongated tortoise, Burmese python, reticulated python, as well as an endangered species, Blyth's river frog.

The highlight of this protected area is Thi Lo Su, the largest waterfall in Thailand and one of biggest waterfalls in Asia. Its name means "black waterfall" in Karen language. There are multiple falls, streams and pools to bathe in and whilst the most spectacular time to visit is between July and November, water flows throughout the year. It is located about 3 km (1.9 mi) from the wildlife sanctuary office.

Apart from Thi Lo Su, Umphang Wildlife Sanctuary also consists of other waterfalls were Pi Tu Kro (heart-shaped waterfall and highest waterfall in Thailand), and Thi Lo Re that lies on its boundary with Thung Yai Naresuan.

== Location ==
Umphang Wildlife Sanctuary in overview PARO 14 (Tak)

12) Umphang Wildlife Sanctuary in overview PARO 14 (Tak)

	National park
1	Doi Soi Malai
2	Khun Phawo
3	Lan Sang
4	Mae Moei
5	Namtok Pha Charoen
6	Ramkhamhaeng
7	Si Satchanalai
8	Taksin Maharat

	Wildlife sanctuary
9	Mae Tuen
10	Tham Chao Ram
11	Thung Yai Naresuan East
12	Umphang
	Non-hunting area
13	Tham Chao Ram

	Forest park
14	Namtok Pa La Tha
15	Phra Tat Huai Luek
16	Tham Lom–Tham Wang
17	Tham Ta Kho Bi

== See also ==
- DNP - Umphang Wildlife Sanctuary
