= Si Satchanalai (disambiguation) =

Si Satchanalai was a historical city and polity in Thailand, also known as Mueang Chaliang.

Si Satchanalai may also refer to:

- Si Satchanalai district, the modern-day amphoe covering the area, in Sukhothai province
- Si Satchanalai Historical Park, an archaeological site covering the present-day ruins of the city
- Si Satchanalai National Park a national park covering nearby forested areas
