= Mueang Tak district =

Mueang Tak เมืองตาก
- District
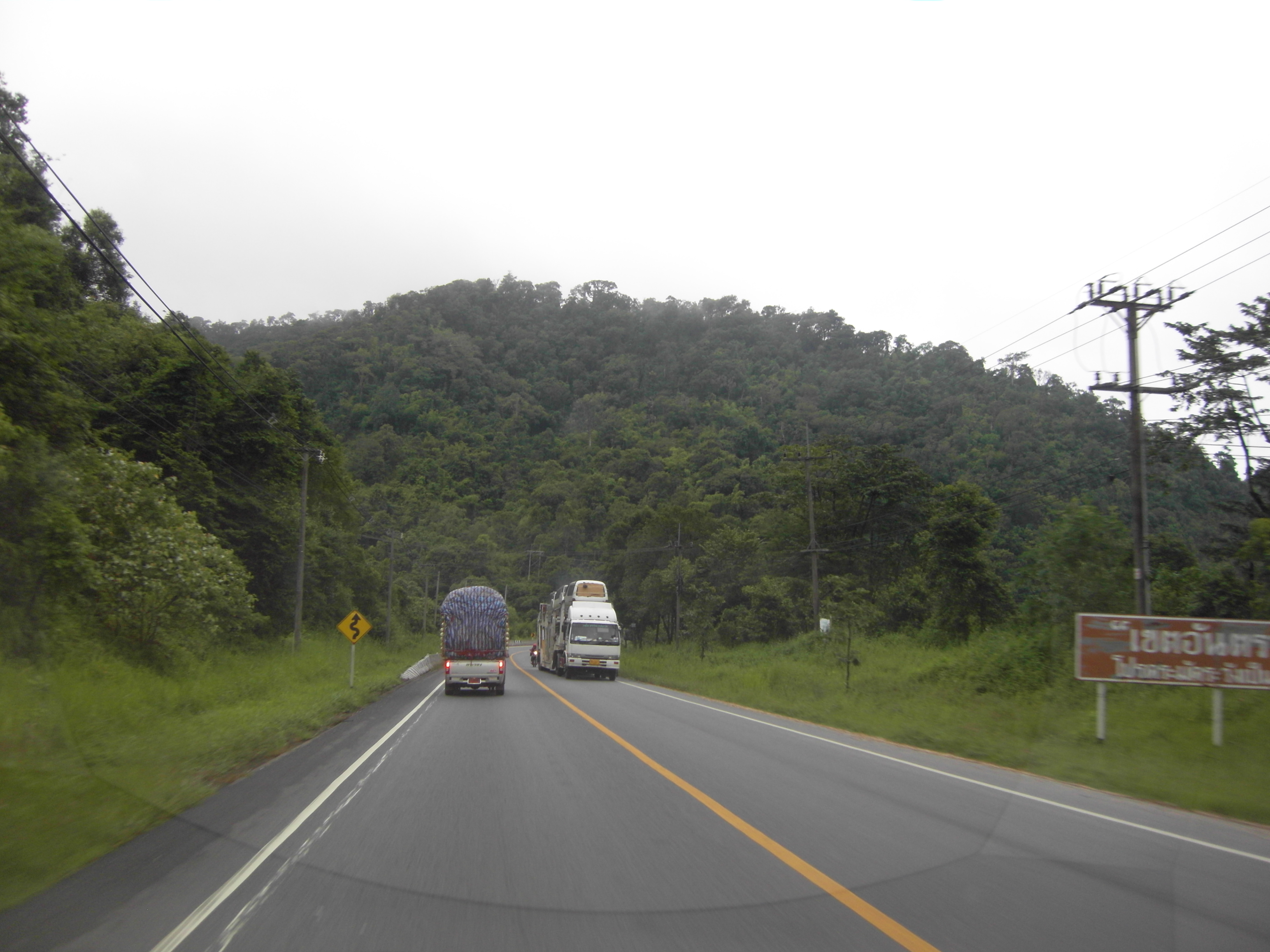
- Mae Tho, Mueang Tak District

- District location in Tak province
- Coordinates: 16°52′54″N 99°7′25″E
- Country: Thailand
- Province: Tak
- Seat: Nong Luang

Area
  - Total: 1,599.356 km^{2} (617.515 sq mi)

Population (2007)
  - Total: 98,493
  - Density: 61.6/km^{2} (160/sq mi)
- Time zone: UTC+7 (ICT)
- Postal code: 63000
- Geocode: 6301

Mueang Tak (Thai: เมืองตาก, pronounced [mɯ̄a̯ŋ tàːk]) is the capital district (amphoe mueang) of Tak province, western Thailand.

== History ==
In the Sukhothai era, Mueang Tak was the western frontier city. The old location of the city was in Tambon Ko Taphao, now Ban Tak district. It was moved because its old location was not strategically good. Another old city name was Ra-haeng.

Mueang Tak district was established in 1886. The first district office was together with the Tak province hall. A new office was established beside Phahonyothin highway in 1956. However 1965 it burned down, thus the government rented the house of Luang San Buranurak as a temporary district office. The new office was finished and opened in 1967.

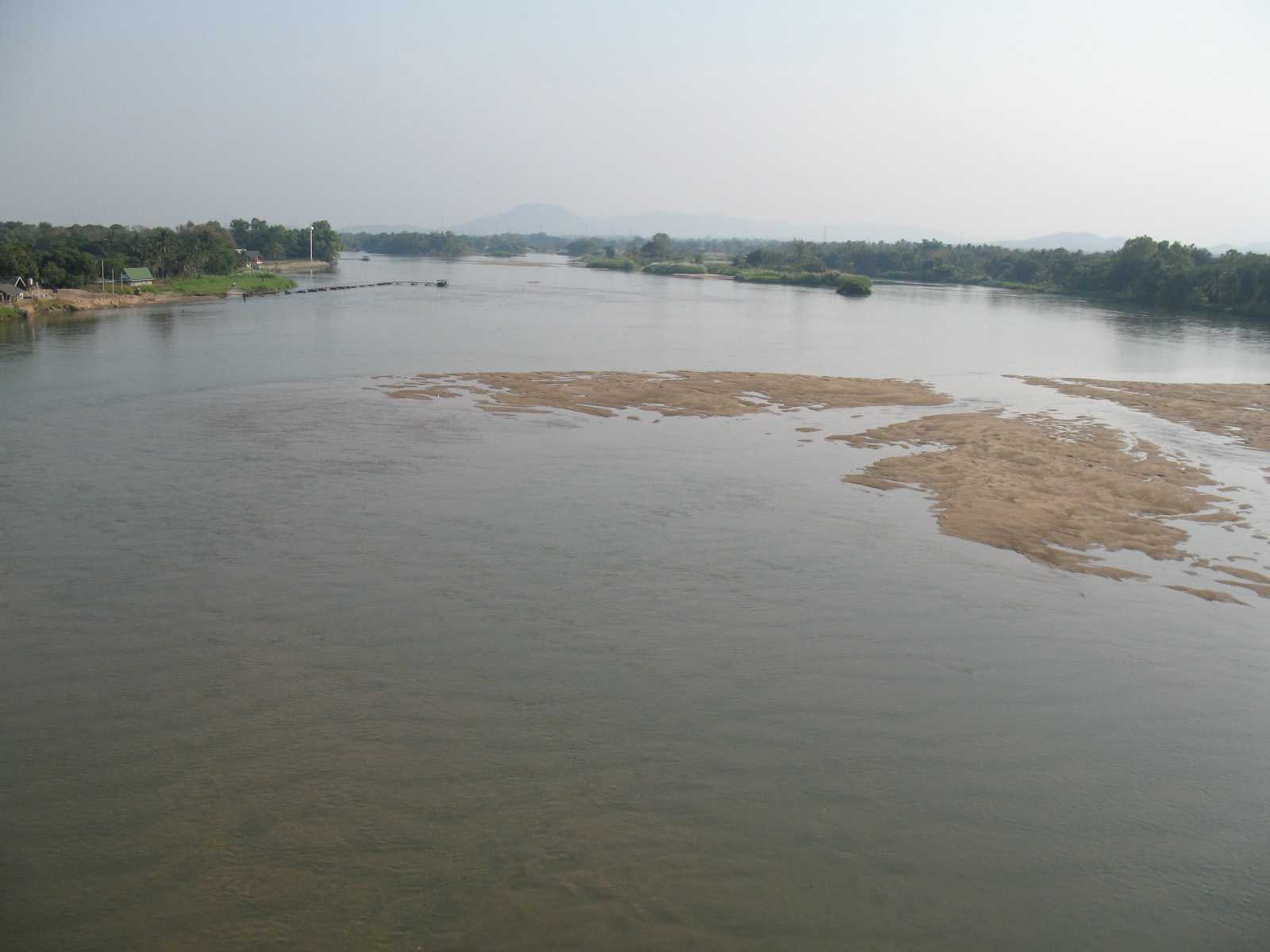
Ping River, view from Kittikachorn Bridge, Mueang Tak

== Geography ==
Neighboring districts are (clockwise from south): Wang Chao, Phop Phra, Mae Sot, Mae Ramat, Ban Tak of Tak Province, Ban Dan Lan Hoi of Sukhothai province, Phran Kratai, Kosamphi Nakhon of Kamphaeng Phet province

The important water resource of the district is the Ping River. There are two national parks in the district: Lan Sang National Park and Taksin Maharat National Park (partly in neighboring Mae Sot).

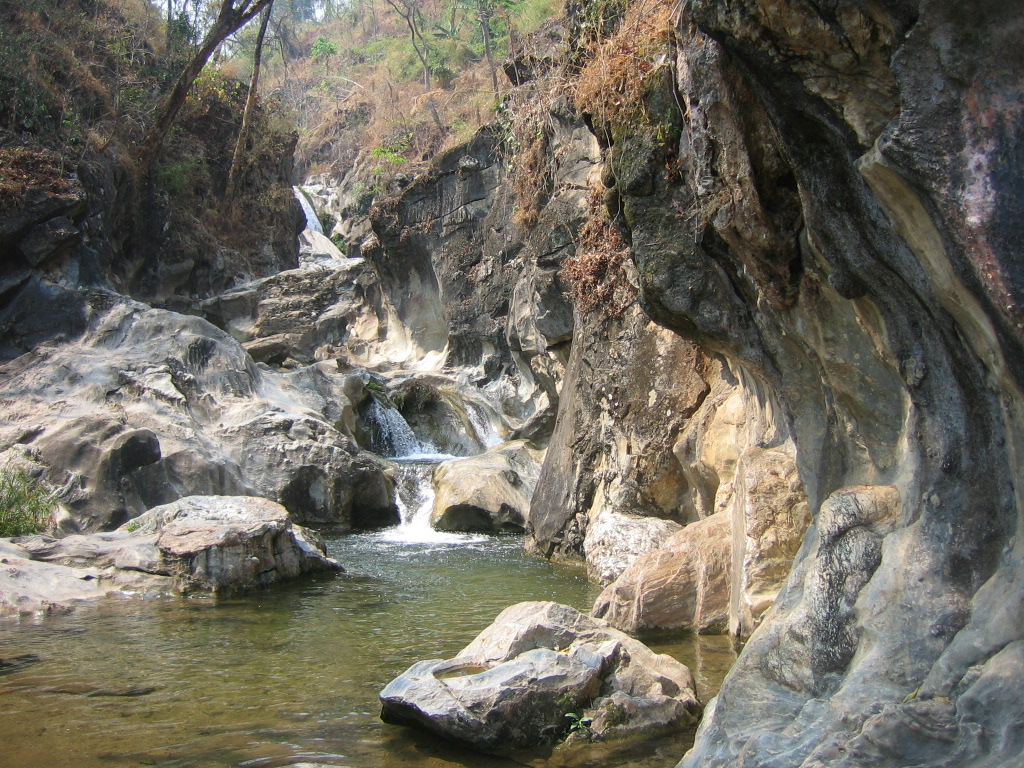
Lan Sang Waterfall in Lan Sang National Park

== Administration ==
The district is divided into 14 sub-districts (tambons), which are further subdivided into 102 villages (mubans). The town (thesaban mueang) Tak covers tambons Rahaeng, Nong Luang, Chiang Ngoen, and Hua Diat, the sub-district municipality (thesaban tambon) Mai Ngam the complete same-named tambon. There are a further nine tambon administrative organizations (TAO).

No.	Name	Thai	Pop.
1.	Rahaeng	ระแหง	6,958
2.	Nong Luang	หนองหลวง	5,896
3.	Chiang Ngoen	เชียงเงิน	3,006
4.	Hua Diat	หัวเดียด	3,644
5.	Nong Bua Nuea	หนองบัวเหนือ	4,652
6.	Mai Ngam	ไม้งาม	9,570
7.	Pong Daeng	โป่งแดง	8,936
8.	Nam Ruem	น้ำรึม	11,688
9.	Wang Hin	วังหิน	9,300
11.	Mae Tho	แม่ท้อ	8,069
12.	Pa Mamuang	ป่ามะม่วง	4,142
13.	Nong Bua Tai	หนองบัวใต้	6,072
14.	Wang Prachop	วังประจบ	12,231
15.	Taluk Klang Thung	ตลุกกลางทุ่ง	4,329

Numbers 10, 16 and 17 belong to the tambon which now form Wang Chao District.
