= Lan Sang National Park =

National park of Thailand

- IUCN category II (national park)
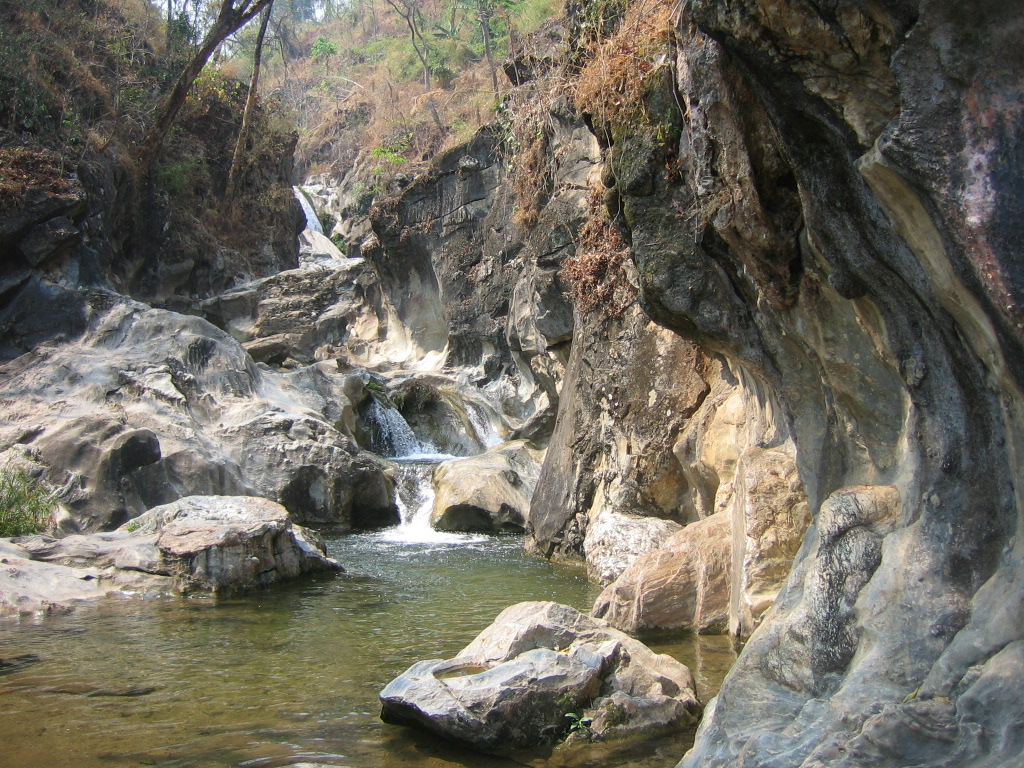
- Waterfall in Lan Sang National Park

- Location within Thailand
- Location: Tak Province, Thailand
- Coordinates: 16°47′N 99°1′E
- Area: 104 km^{2} (40 sq mi)
- Established: 1979
- Visitors: 38,882 (in 2019)
- Governing body: Department of National Parks, Wildlife and Plant Conservation

Lan Sang National Park (Thai: อุทยานแห่งชาติลานสาง) is in the Dawna Range, Tak Province, northern Thailand. Established in 1979, it is an IUCN Category II protected area measuring 65,000 rai ~ 104 square kilometres (40 sq mi). On the Tak-Mae Sot Highway in Mueang Tak District, it became the country's 15th national park.

== Toponymy ==
The precise meaning of the name is not known. Each of the two words have various interpretations.

1. Lan (Thai: ลาน) may refer to the fan palm, Corypha umbraculifera, Corypha lecontei, ton laan (ต้นลาน) fan palm tree, bai laan (ใบลาน) leaf of fan palm sometimes used for writing religious texts; noun yard, lawn, court, courtyard, open space, plaza, grounds; (coiled metal) spring; modifier dazzled, flustered, dazzling, overwhelming.
2. Sang or saang (สาง) may refer to the stench or odor of decaying flesh and as a modifier, putrid, foul, rank; as a noun, ghost, spirit, spook, apparition, spectre, wraith or tiger–like mythical animal; as a verb, to clear out, clear up.

== Sights ==
Lan Sang National Park covers an area of 65,000 rai. Various types of forest, such as rain forest, coniferous forest, hill evergreen forest, deciduous dipterocarp forest, and mixed deciduous forest, are found in different geographical areas. Wild animals found are common wild pig, barking deer, Siamese big-headed turtle, serow, civet, Black-crested Bulbul, and flying lizards

- Namtok Pha Lat (น้ำตกผาลาด) This waterfall flows through a split-level hill of rocks down a broad complex ground of rocks. The ground slopes a bit and is 25 m wide and 40 m long.
- Namtok Lan Liang Ma (1st tier)(น้ำตกลานเลี้ยงม้า) (ชั้นที่ ๑) It features a small rocky hill with a hole of around 6 m wide in the middle. The currents of Lam Huai Lan Sang pass through the hole against the water surface below. The waterfall is around 5 m high.
- Namtok Lan Sang (2nd tier) (น้ำตกลานสาง)(ชั้น ๒) The water gushes from a crevice of the mountain and cascades in three tiers before flowing into a pond and falling down to Namtok Lan Liang Ma.
- Namtok Pha Ngoep (3rd tier) (น้ำตกผาเงิบ) (ชั้น ๓) The waterfall is 19 m high and has water only in the rainy and cool seasons. A prominent feature is Pha Ngoep, a high steep cliff with angular crevices.
- Namtok Pha Phueng (4th tier) (น้ำตกผาผึ้ง) (ชั้นที่ ๔) The waterfall features a 30 m high-flat surface cliff with a slope of 70 degrees. The water of Huai Lan Sang overflows the top of this waterfall and spreads whitewater to flow along the cliff and lower small layers of rocks covering the broad area before falling down to the pond below.
- Namtok Pha The (น้ำตกผาเท) This one-tier waterfall features a steep cliff 25 m high. The water of Huai Lan Sang runs quickly through a small narrow channel towards the cliff top where the ground is abruptly low.
- Namtok Pha Nam Yoi (น้ำตกผาน้ำย้อย) This waterfall flows through a narrow channel in layers down to a broad and very deep pond.
- Namtok Tha Le (น้ำตกท่าเลย์) This waterfall of 50 m high features a slope with water flowing in layers from a cliff.
- Viewpoint (จุดชมวิว) The Lan Sang National Park has a viewpoint on the top of Khao Noi overlooking a vista of Tak town.

== Location ==
Lan Sang National Park in overview PARO 14 (Tak)

3) Lan Sang National Park in overview PARO 14 (Tak)

	National park
1	Doi Soi Malai
2	Khun Phawo
3	Lan Sang
4	Mae Moei
5	Namtok Pha Charoen
6	Ramkhamhaeng
7	Si Satchanalai
8	Taksin Maharat

	Wildlife sanctuary
9	Mae Tuen
10	Tham Chao Ram
11	Thung Yai Naresuan East
12	Umphang
	Non-hunting area
13	Tham Chao Ram

	Forest park
14	Namtok Pa La Tha
15	Phra Tat Huai Luek
16	Tham Lom–Tham Wang
17	Tham Ta Kho Bi

== See also ==
- List of national parks of Thailand
- DNP - Lan Sang National Park
- List of Protected Areas Regional Offices of Thailand
