= Ramkhamhaeng National Park =

National park in Thailand

- อุทยานแห่งชาติรามคำแหง
- IUCN category II (national park)
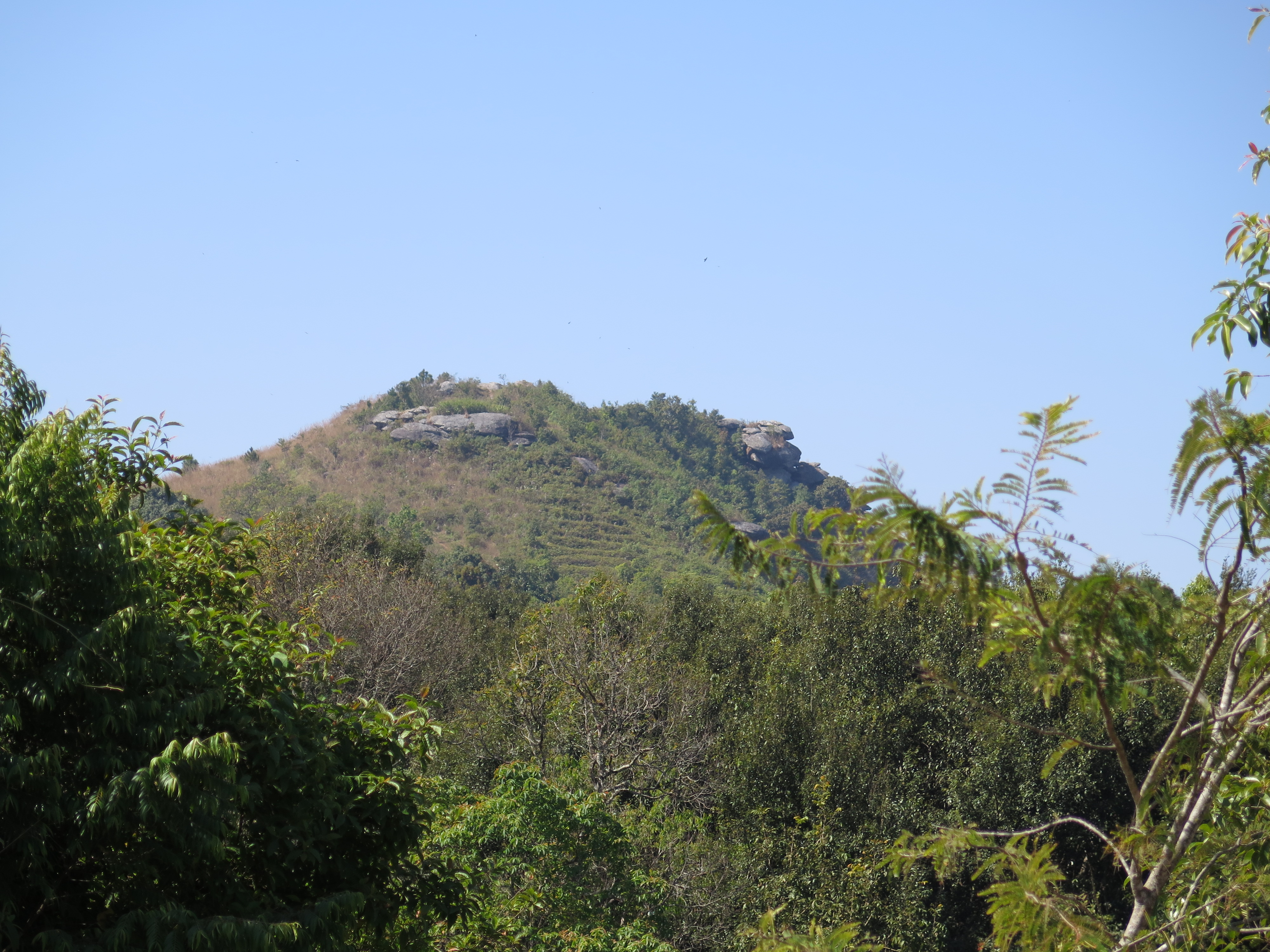
- Khao Phra Mae Ya Summit

- Location within Thailand
- Location: Sukhothai Province, Thailand
- Nearest city: Sukhothai
- Coordinates: 16°54′30″N 99°39′0″E
- Area: 341 km^{2} (132 sq mi)
- Established: 1980
- Visitors: 23,356 (in 2019)
- Governing body: Department of National Parks, Wildlife and Plant Conservation

Ramkhamhaeng National Park (Thai: อุทยานแห่งชาติรามคำแหง) is a national park in Thailand.

== Description ==
Ramkhamhaeng National Park, with an area of 213,125 rai ~ 341 square kilometres (132 sq mi) lies in Ban Dan Lan Hoi, Khiri Mat and Mueang Sukhothai districts of Sukhothai Province, the north of Thailand.

The majority of the park's land is within the contours of the Khao Luang Mountain Range. This mountain range describes a north–south axis. Khao Luang is like a giant hill in the middle of a rice field, for it is surrounded by low farmland. The notable topography of this park are the four main peaks of the Khao Luang Range: Khao Phu Kha, Khao Phra Mae Ya, Khao Chedi, and Khao Pha Narai. The waters of the mountain range are essential to the agricultural lands below. These waters, Khlong Ta Chek, Khlong Sao Ho, Khlong Wang Ngen, Khlong Noen Khli, Khlong Duang Ngam, Khlong Lan Thong, Khlong Masang, and Khong Phetchahueng are also tributaries of the Yom River to the east, and the Ping River in the west.

== History ==
Sukhothai may have been the first capital of Thais (13th to 14th centuries). Sukhothai Historical Park, the center of this ancient capital, merges with Ramkhamhaeng National Park in the northeastern corner of the Khao Luang Mountain Range. Many ancient structures were built within Khao Luang. Ramkhamhaeng National Park area is mentioned in the famous stone Sukhothai Inscription I of King Ramkhamhaeng, the great king of the period. The Sukhothai Inscription is further evidence of the important, even sacred, relationship between the peoples of this original Thai capital and the natural area of Ramkhamhaeng National Park.

In 1974 the Royal Forest Department issued letters to Sukhothai provincial authorities, including forestry officials of the province, asking them to inspect the Khao Luang area. The purpose of this inspection was to determine whether this area was suitable to become either a wildlife sanctuary or national park. Sukhothai provincial authorities, along with the Tak Royal Forest Department Unit, proposed that Khao Luang should become a national park. The National Parks Division of the Royal Forest Department then presented a proposal to the National Park Committee at their second meeting on 22 October 1975. An agreement was reached to set up a national park in this area by royal decree, recorded in the Royal Gazette, number 97, section 165, October 27, 1980, This area became the 18th national park of Thailand Park in honor of King Ramkhamhaeng.

== Location ==
Ramkhamhaeng National Park in overview PARO 14 (Tak)

6) Ramkhamhaeng National Park in overview PARO 14 (Tak)

	National park
1	Doi Soi Malai
2	Khun Phawo
3	Lan Sang
4	Mae Moei
5	Namtok Pha Charoen
6	Ramkhamhaeng
7	Si Satchanalai
8	Taksin Maharat

	Wildlife sanctuary
9	Mae Tuen
10	Tham Chao Ram
11	Thung Yai Naresuan East
12	Umphang
	Non-hunting area
13	Tham Chao Ram

	Forest park
14	Namtok Pa La Tha
15	Phra Tat Huai Luek
16	Tham Lom–Tham Wang
17	Tham Ta Kho Bi

== See also ==
- List of national parks of Thailand
- DNP - Ramkhamhaeng National Park
- List of Protected Areas Regional Offices of Thailand
