= Tak province =

Tak ตาก
- Province
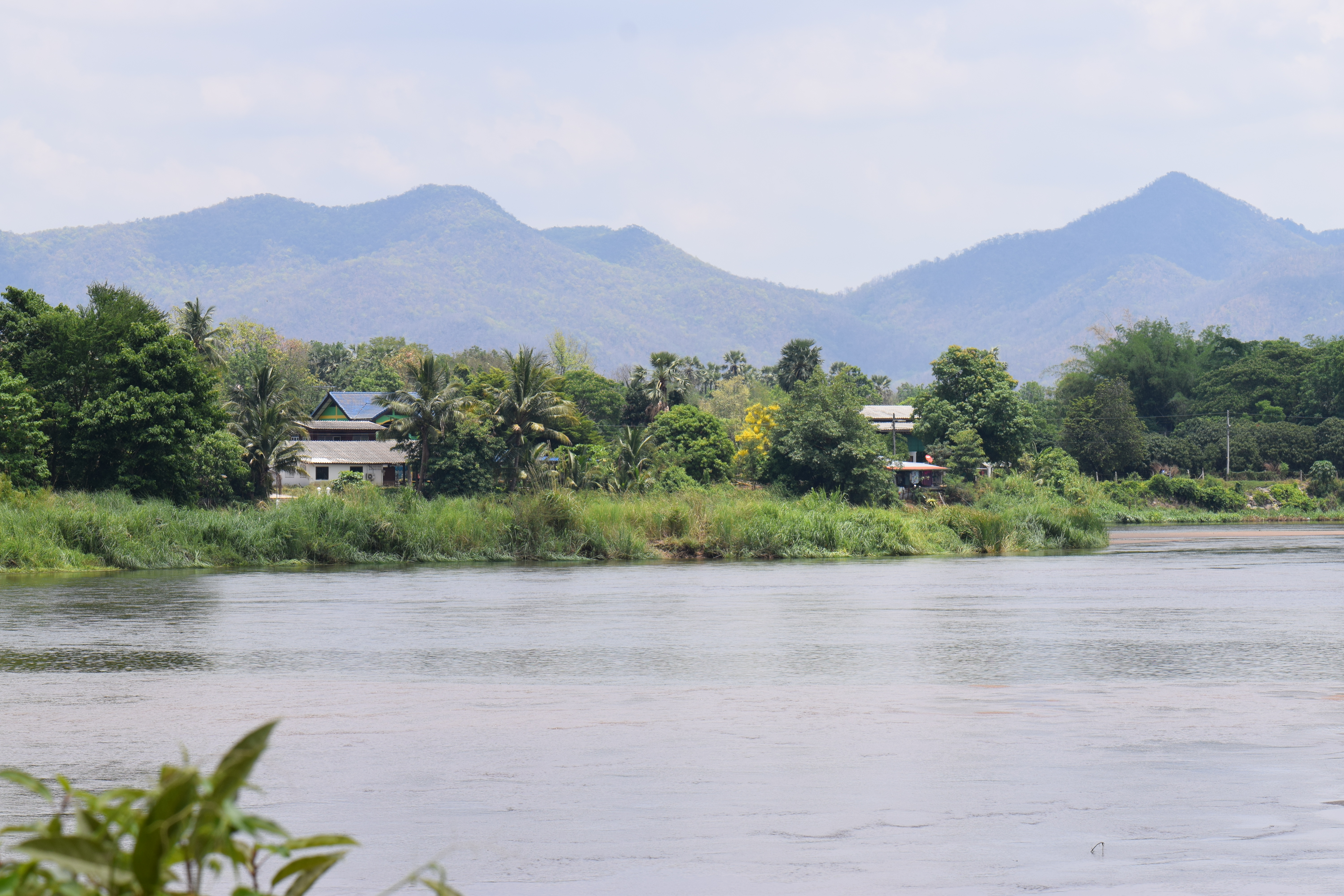
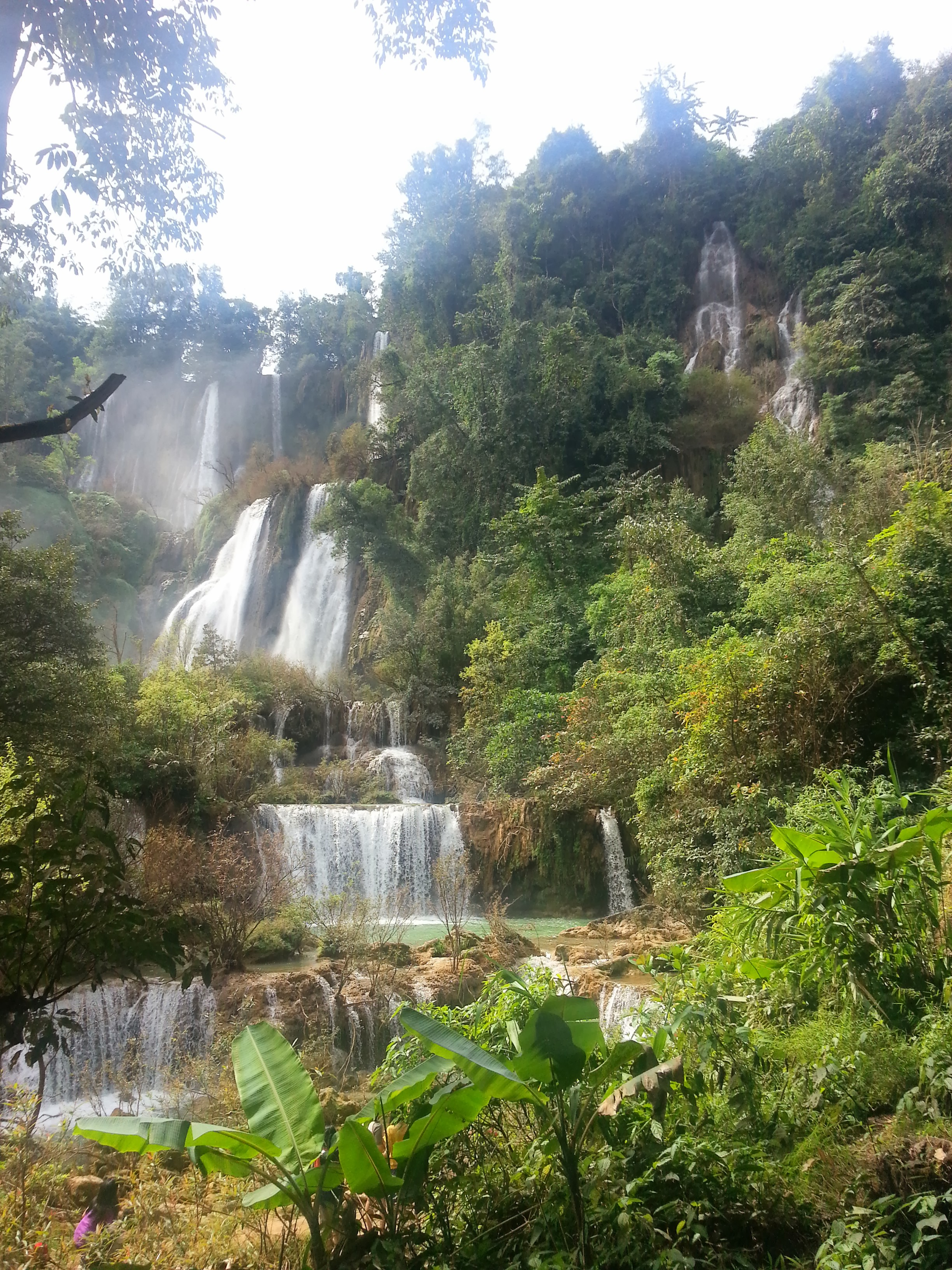
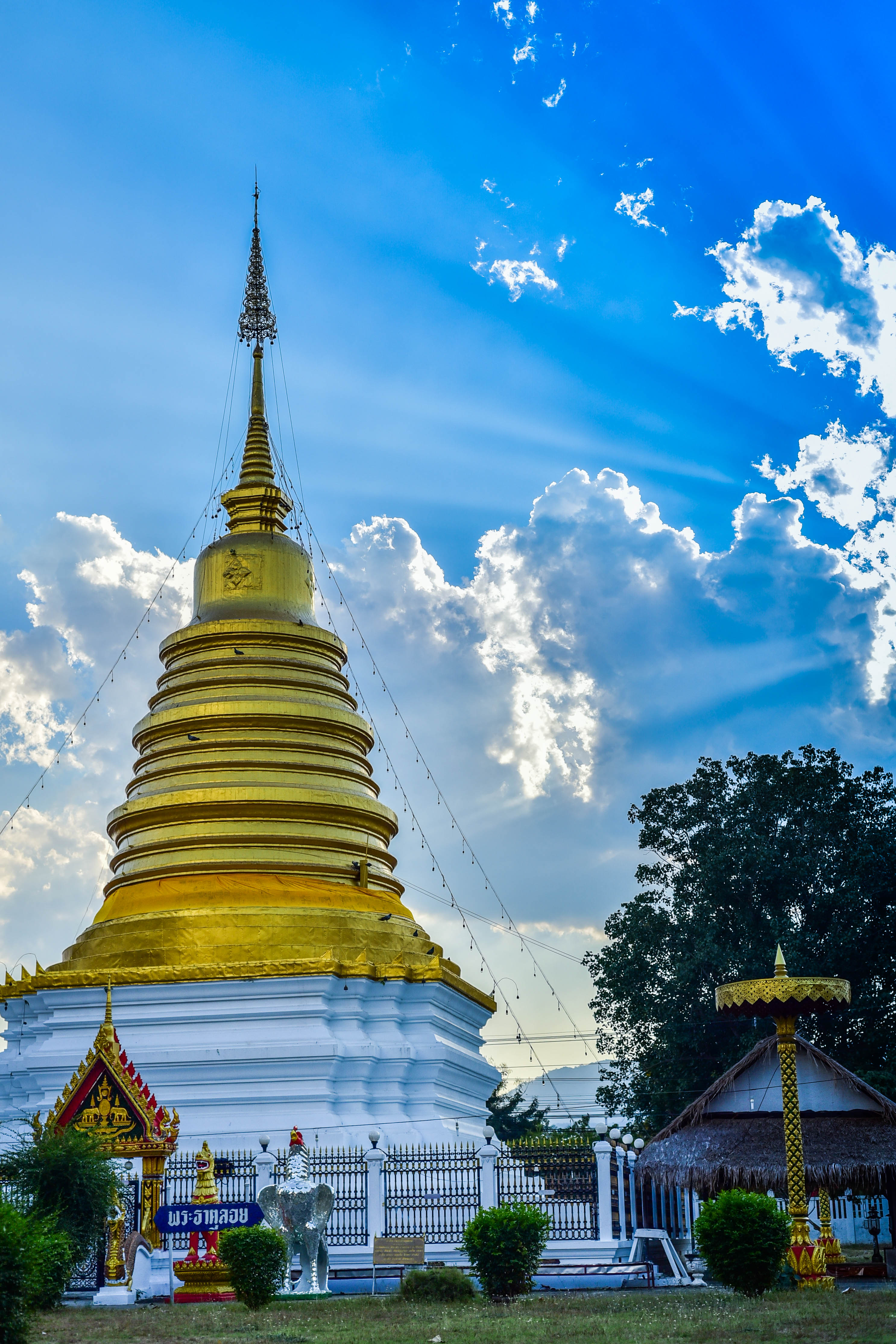
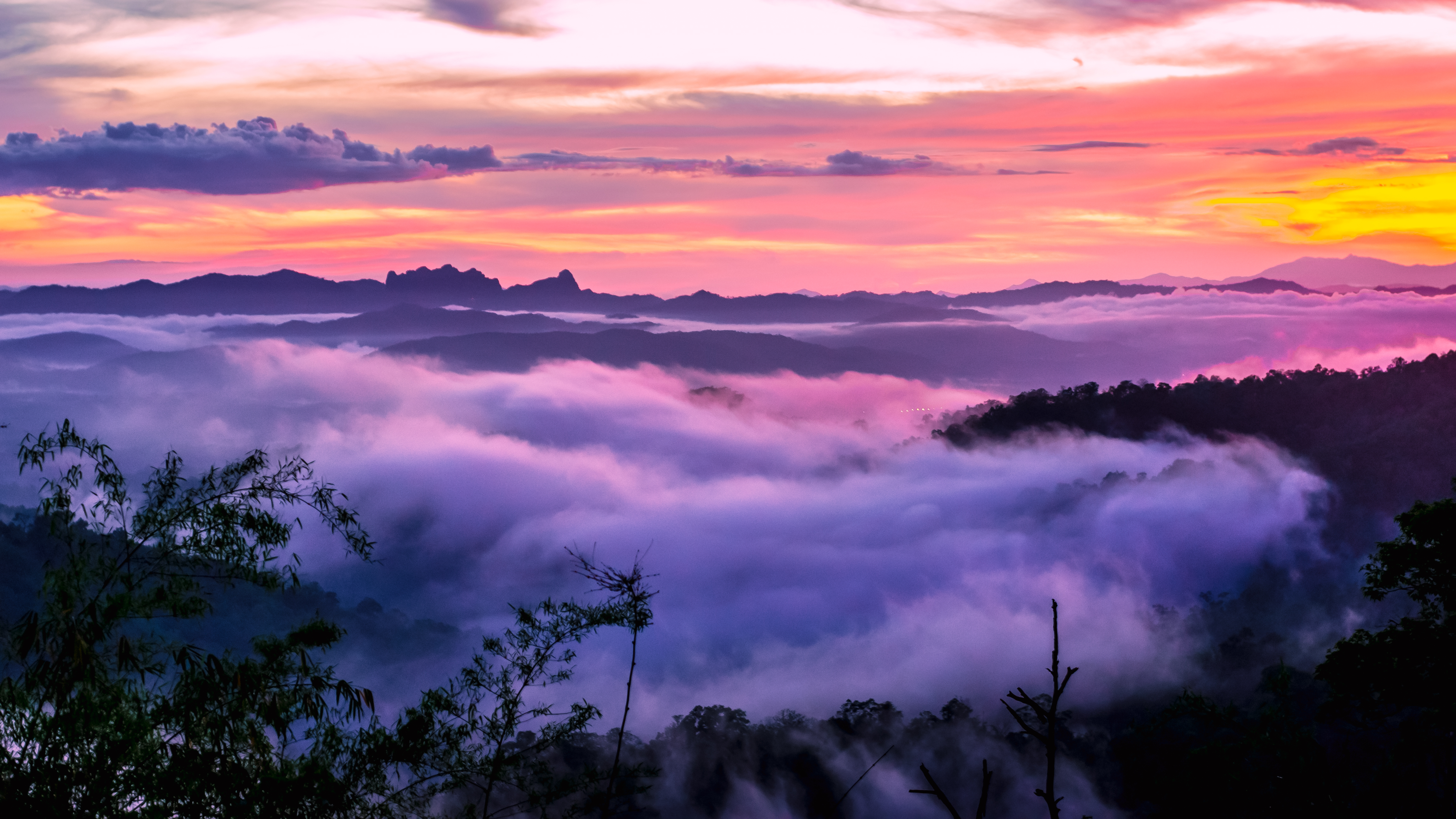
- Ping River in Tak Thi Lo Su Waterfall Wat Chon Prathan Rangsan Taksin Maharat National Park Sea of Mist

- Flag Seal
- Mottoes: ธรรมชาติน่ายล ภูมิพลเขื่อนใหญ่ พระเจ้าตากเกรียงไกร เมืองไม้และป่างาม ("Nature worth seeing. The massive Bhumibol Dam. Brave King Taksin. The city of beautiful woods and forests.")
- Map of Thailand highlighting Tak province
- Coordinates: 16°53′2″N 99°7′30″E
- Country: Thailand
- Capital: Tak

Government
  - Governor: Chucheep Pongchai

Area
  - Total: 17,303 km^{2} (6,681 sq mi)
  - Rank: 4th

Population (2024)
  - Total: ▼698,597
  - Rank: 39th
  - Density: 40/km^{2} (100/sq mi)
  - Rank: 75th

Human Achievement Index
  - HAI (2022): 0.6229 "low" Ranked 65th

GDP
  - Total: baht 48 billion (US$1.7 billion) (2019)
- Time zone: UTC+7 (ICT)
- Postal code: 63xxx
- Calling code: 055
- ISO 3166 code: TH-63
- Website: tak.go.th

Tak Provincial Administrative Organization องค์การบริหารส่วนจังหวัดตาก
- Provincial Administrative Organization
- Interactive map of Tak Provincial Administrative Organization

Government
  - Type: Local administrative divisions
  - Body: Tak Provincial Administrative Organization
  - President: Atchara Thaweekueakulkit
- Website: takpao.go.th

Tak (Thai: ตาก, pronounced [tàːk]) is one of Thailand's seventy-seven provinces (changwat) and lies in Western Thailand. Neighbouring provinces are (from north clockwise) Mae Hong Son, Chiang Mai, Lamphun, Lampang, Sukhothai, Kamphaeng Phet, Nakhon Sawan, Uthai Thani and Kanchanaburi. The western edge of the province has a long boundary with Kayin State of Myanmar (Burma).

== Geography ==
The Bhumibol Dam (named after King Bhumibol Adulyadej, the old name was Yanhee Dam) is in Khao Kaew Tambon (sub-district), Sam Ngao District of Tak and was built from 1958 to 1964. It stops the river Ping, one of the two sources of the Chao Phraya River. The artificial lake created covers an area of 300 km^{2} and is the largest in Thailand. Taksin Maharat National Park, Namtok Pha Charoen National Park, Lan Sang National Park, and Khun Phawo National Parks are all in the province. Thungyai Naresuan Wildlife Sanctuary shares half of the lake front with Kanchanaburi and Huai Kha Khaeng Wildlife Sanctuary at the border with Uthai Thani and are World Heritage Sites.

On the western side of Tak province the Tenasserim Hills meet the Dawna Range. One of the few transnational roads and cross-border points into Myanmar is at Mae Sot. Northwest of Mae Sot the main road on the Thai side skirts the border until it turns straight north towards Mae Hong Son.

Tak province occupies 17,303 km^{2} (6,681 sq mi) and lies 426 km north of Bangkok. The total forest area is 12,455 km^{2} (4,809 sq mi) or 72 percent of provincial area.

=== National parks ===
Six of the eight national parks in region 14 (Tak), Ramkhamhaeng and Si Satchanalai national parks are not in Tak province, and with Mae Ping in region 16 (Chiang Mai) and Mae Wa in region 13 (Lampang branch), they are the protected areas of Tak province.(Visitors in fiscal year 2024)

Mae Ping National Park	1,004 km^{2} (388 sq mi)	(35,415)
Namtok Pha Charoen National Park	770 km^{2} (300 sq mi)	(131,914)
Mae Wa National Park	583 km^{2} (225 sq mi)	(4,432)
Khun Phawo National Park	397 km^{2} (153 sq mi)	(6,973)
Doi Soi Malai National Park	355 km^{2} (137 sq mi)	(34,302)
Mae Moei National Park	185 km^{2} (71 sq mi)	(4,813)
Taksin Maharat National Park	149 km^{2} (58 sq mi)	(26,345)
Lan Sang National Park	104 km^{2} (40 sq mi)	(32,696)

=== Wildlife sanctuaries ===
There are a total of four wildlife sanctuaries, three of which are in region 14 (Tak), but Tham Chao Ram is not in Tak province, and Omkoi in region 16 (Chiang Mai) form protected areas of Tak province.

Umphang Wildlife Sanctuary	2,590 km^{2} (1,000 sq mi)
Thung Yai Naresuan East Wildlife Sanctuary	1,517 km^{2} (586 sq mi)
Omkoi Wildlife Sanctuary	1,224 km^{2} (473 sq mi)
Mae Tuen Wildlife Sanctuary	1,173 km^{2} (453 sq mi)

== History ==
Tak was a historical kingdom built over 2,000 years ago, even before the Sukhothai period. The ancient kingdom had its peak around the 1st century. By the 5th century the capital of this kingdom was moved south to Lavo (present day Lopburi province). A city named Ban Tak was established by Jamadevi (พระนางจามเทวี), princess of the Lavo kingdom, around 663 CE. It became part of the Sukhothai kingdom through battles led by Ramkhamhaeng the Great and formed the main fortress on the western front. The city was moved further west and renamed Mueang Rahang when the Ayuthaya kingdom was lost to Burma during King Maha Thammaracha's reign. The city was moved back to the east side of the Ping River during the early Bangkok period. Chinese stoneware and porcelain of the Song, Yuan and Ming periods have been recorded as grave goods at highland burial grounds in Umphang and Phop Phra. Srisak Vallibhotama counts Tak among the seven modern provinces that covered the core of Sukhothai. In Dhida Saraya's reconstruction of Sukhothai's trade routes, the western route ran through Chot, a district of the present Tak province, to Martaban and Pegu. The Mae Lamao transit post, in the present Mae Sot district, was the route by which Bayinnaung entered Siam in 1563 and again in November 1568.

King Taksin was vice-governor of Tak before the Ayutthaya kingdom fell during the war with Burma. As his name was Sin, he became called Tak-Sin during his time in Tak.

== Demographics ==
About a quarter of the population belongs to one of Thailand's tribe hill tribes: Yao, Karen (Thai Kariang), Akha (Thai Akha), Lahu (Thai Musoe), Hmong (Thai Mong), and Lisu (Thai Lisaw). The largest tribe in Tak is Karen.

== Refugees ==
According to the UNHCR data of 2008, nearly 95,000 of Thailand's 121,000 registered refugees from Burma are housed in several refugee camps in Tak province of which Mae La camp is the largest with around 45,000 Karen refugees.

== Symbols ==
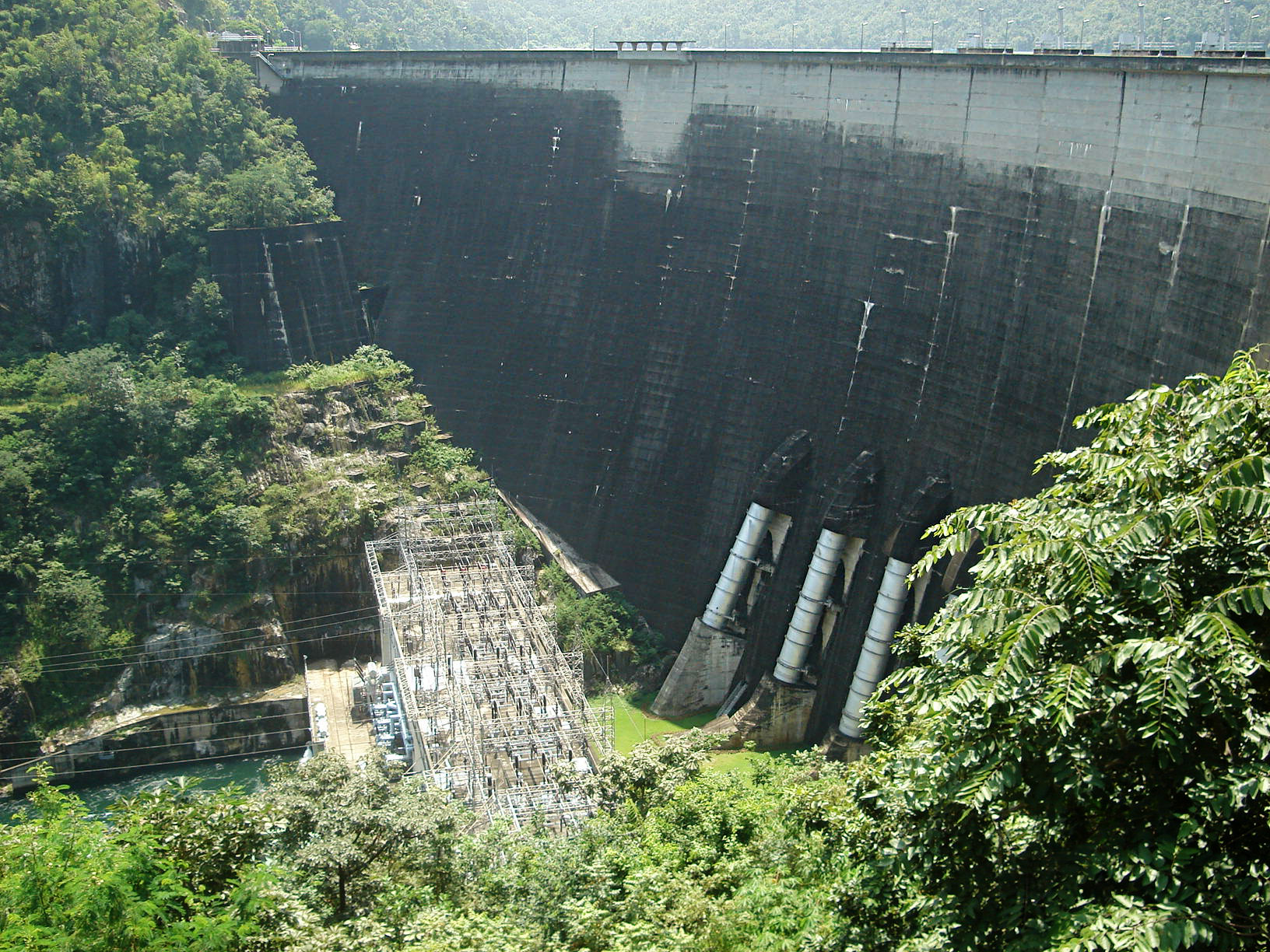
Bhumibol Dam

The provincial seal shows King Naresuan on the royal elephant. Sometimes below the elephant a garuda is depicted, as the garuda is the state symbol of Thailand. King Naresuan is shown pouring consecrated water on the ground, a symbolic act to declare independence. This refers to the war of 1584 with Burma, when Tak was the first border town to be liberated from Burmese control.

The provincial slogan is, "A town of wonderful nature, huge Bhumiphol Dam, King Taksin The Great and beautiful forests".

The provincial tree is the Asian Jatoba (Xylia xylocarpa var. kerrii), and the provincial flower is the Orchid tree (Bauhinia sp.). The cyprinid fish Hypsibarbus malcolmi is the provincial aquatic life.

== Administrative divisions ==
Map of nine districts

=== Provincial government ===
The province is divided into nine districts (amphoes). These are further divided into 63 subdistricts (tambons) and 493 villages (mubans).

1. Mueang Tak
2. Ban Tak
3. Sam Ngao
4. Mae Ramat
5. Tha Song Yang
6. Mae Sot
7. Phop Phra
8. Umphang
9. Wang Chao

=== Local government ===
As of 26 November 2019 there are: one Tak Provincial Administration Organisation (ongkan borihan suan changwat) and 19 municipal (thesaban) areas in the province. Mae Sot has city (thesaban nakhon) status. Tak has town (thesaban mueang) status. Further 17 subdistrict municipalities (thesaban tambon). The non-municipal areas are administered by 49 Subdistrict Administrative Organisations - SAO (ongkan borihan suan tambon).

=== Location protected areas ===
Overview protected areas of Tak

Tak protected areas

	National park
1	Doi Soi Malai
2	Khun Phawo
3	Lan Sang
4	Mae Moei
5	Mae Ping
6	Mae Wa
7	Namtok Pha Charoen
8	Taksin Maharat

	Wildlife sanctuary
9	Mae Tuen
10	Omkoi
11	Thung Yai Naresuan East
12	Umphang

== Health ==
There are two main public hospitals in Tak: Somdejphrajaotaksin Maharaj Hospital and Mae Sot Hospital, both operated by the Ministry of Public Health.

== Economy ==
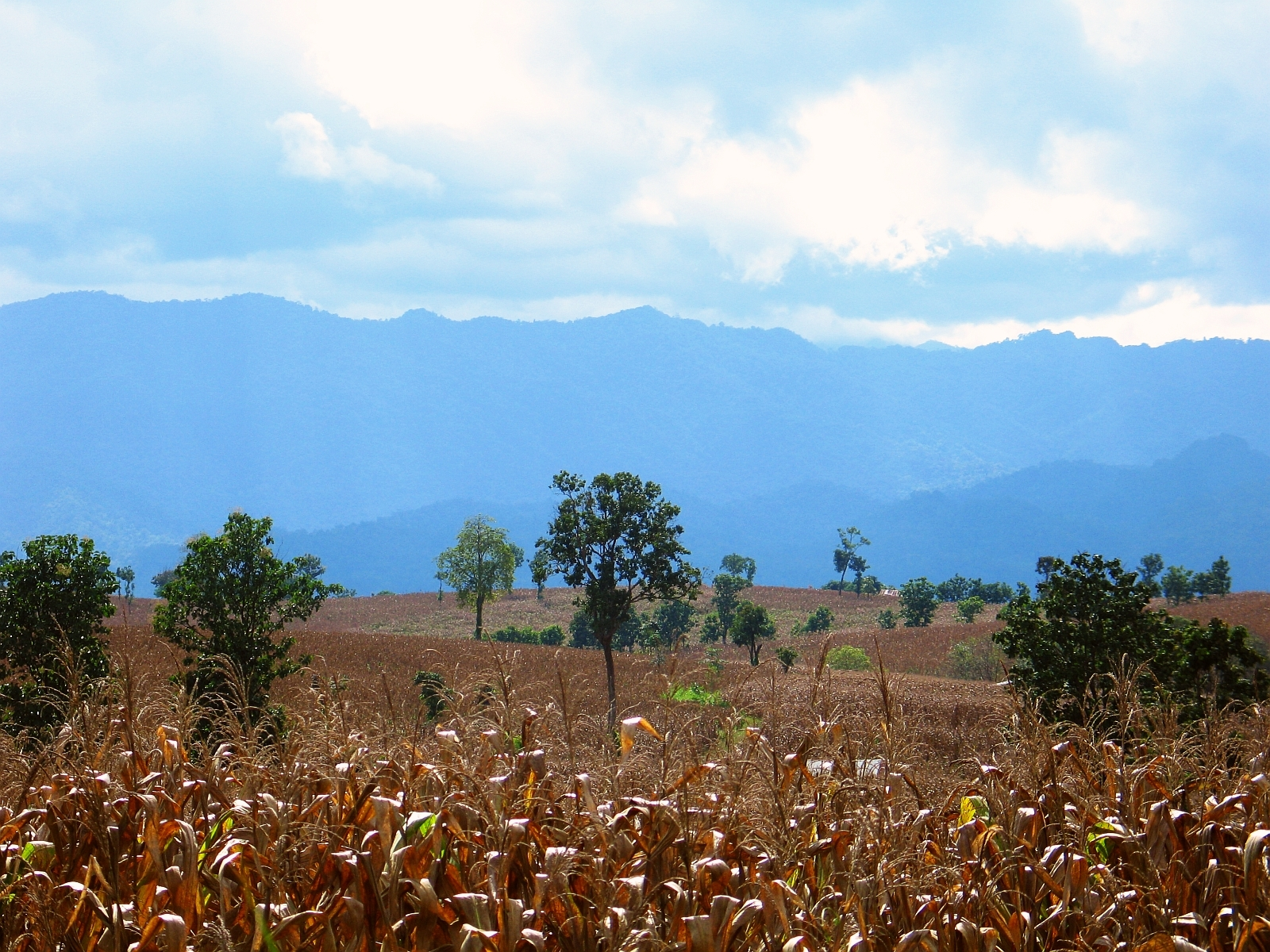
Cornfields and the mountains of Burma south of Mae Sot

Agriculture is a major part of the Tak economy. The province of Tak produces rice, corn, vegetables, fruits, beef, tilapia, and other foods. Industries in Tak include granite quarrying and jewelry. Zinc mining was formerly conducted in Mae Sot District.

Handicrafts and Myanmar products are also important for trade. The Bhumibol Dam in the northern part of Tak is its most popular tourist attraction. Tourism, especially ecotourism, in the southern part is seasonal with popular destinations such as the Thi Lo Su Waterfall, Thi Lo Le Waterfall, hiking and white water rafting in its various forest reserves. Tak is also known for its Loi Krathong festival where krathong sai (กระทงสาย) consisting of many krathongs are floated in a long line down the river. The Loi Krathong festival is held on the Ping River in Mueang Tak District on Loi Krathong night.

== Transportation ==
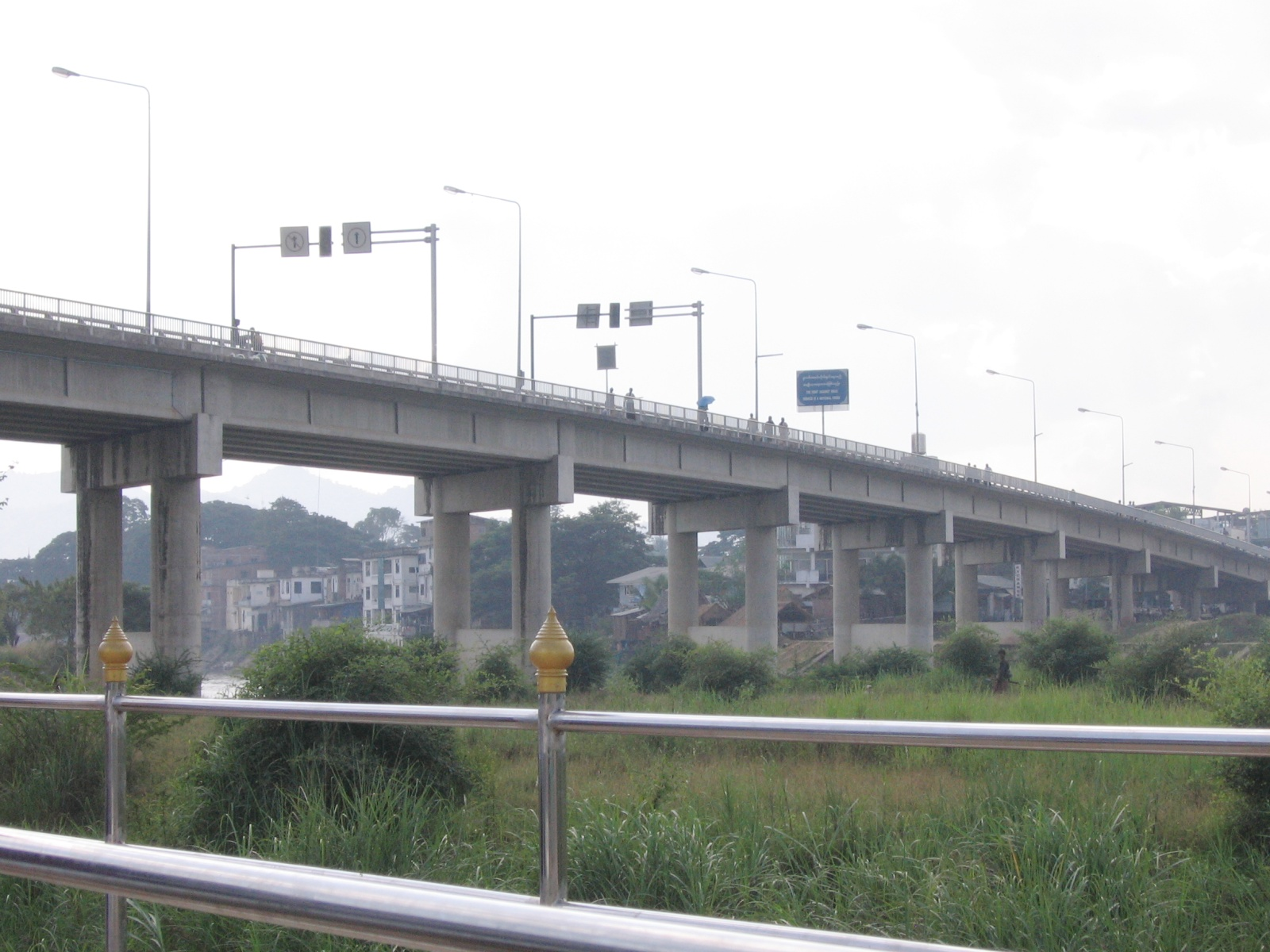
Thai-Myanmar Friendship Bridge over Moei River, part of AH1

=== Roads ===
Tak is a key communication and transportation centre of the north, with three Asian highways passing through the province. AH1 enters through the Myanmar-Thai border at Mae Sot District AH2 passes through the province from north to south. Also AH16 terminates at Tak.

=== Air ===
Tak province is served by Mae Sot Airport and Tak Airport. There have been no airlines serving Tak Airport since March 1994, but the Tak Airport is still in operation.

== Human achievement index 2022 ==
Health	Education	Employment	Income
67	74	8	68
Housing	Family	Transport	Participation
2	2	76	49
Province Tak, with an HAI 2022 value of 0.6229 is "low", occupies place 65 in the ranking.

Since 2003, United Nations Development Programme (UNDP) in Thailand has tracked progress on human development at sub-national level using the Human achievement index (HAI), a composite index covering all the eight key areas of human development. National Economic and Social Development Board (NESDB) has taken over this task since 2017.

Rank	Classification
1–13	"High"
14–29	"Somewhat high"
30–45	"Average"
46–61	"Somewhat low"
62–77	"Low"

Map with provinces and HAI 2022 rankings
