= Thi Lo Su Waterfall =

- น้ำตกทีลอซู
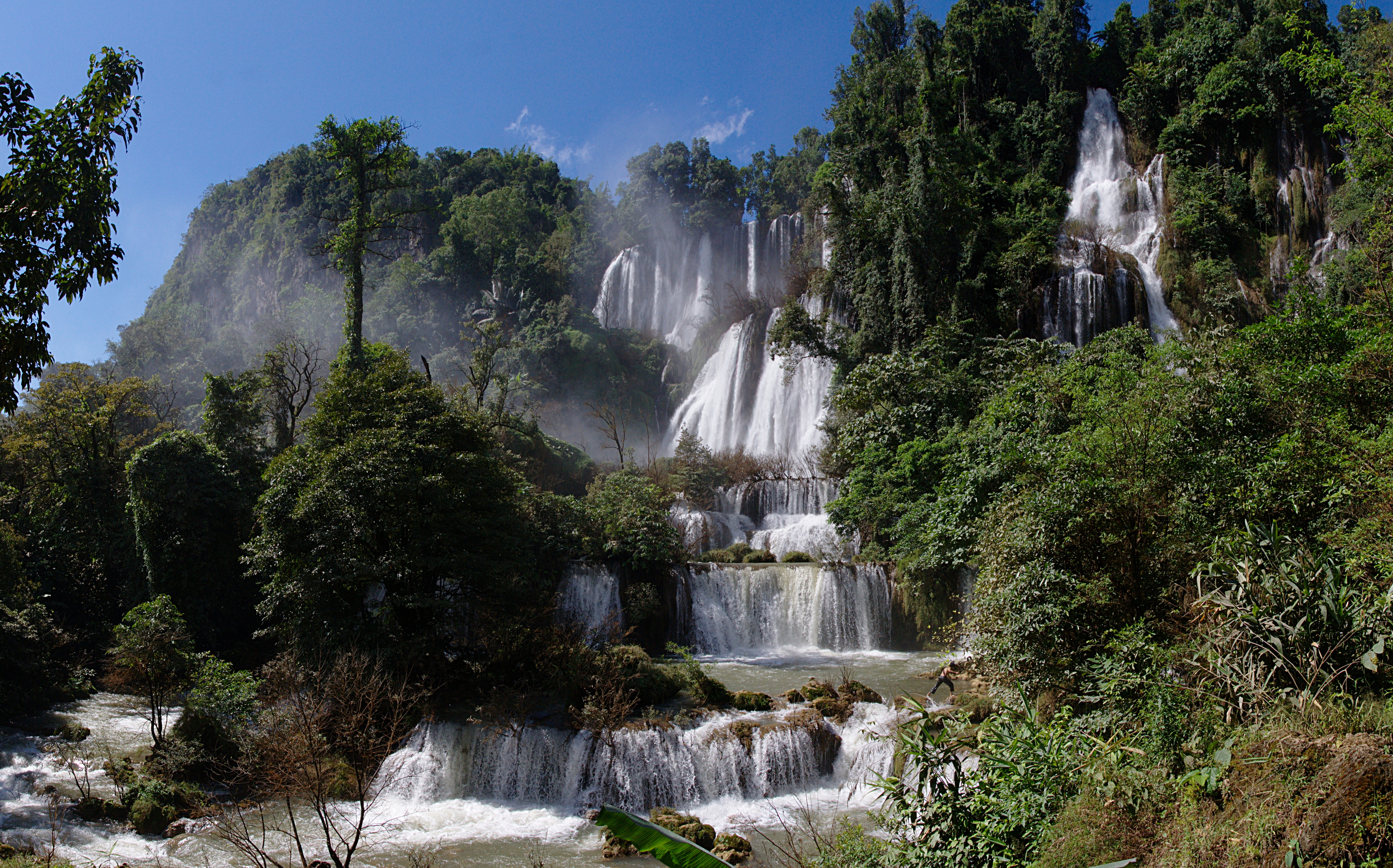
- Thi Lo Su waterfall

- Location within Thailand
- Location: Umphang, Tak, Thailand
- Coordinates: 15.9282°N 98.7535°E
- Type: Segmented
- Total height: 250 metres (820 ft)
- Watercourse: Klotho Creek

The Thi Lo Su Waterfall (Thai: น้ำตกทีลอซู, RTGS: Namtok Thi Lo Su; S'gaw Karen: ထံလီၤဆူ, also spelt as Thee Lor Sue, The Lor Sue, Thee Lor Sue or Te-law-zue; lit: Black Waterfall) is claimed to be the largest and highest waterfall in Thailand. It stands 250 metres (820 ft) high and nearly 450 metres (1,480 ft) wide on the Mae Klong River, flowing down from Huai Klotho into the Umphang Wildlife Sanctuary in Tak Province in northwestern Thailand.

The waterfall has apparently never been surveyed, so the figures given are approximate.

Access to the waterfall campsite by private vehicles has been stopped. It is now only accessible via a cartel of pickups. Private vehicles have to be parked in Umphang.

== See also ==
- List of waterfalls
