= Wang Chao district =

Wang Chao วังเจ้า
- District
- District location in Tak province
- Coordinates: 16°42′15″N 99°14′34″E
- Country: Thailand
- Province: Tak
- Seat: Chiang Thong

Area
  - Total: 328.9 km^{2} (127.0 sq mi)

Population (2005)
  - Total: 29,726
  - Density: 90.4/km^{2} (234/sq mi)
- Time zone: UTC+7 (ICT)
- Postal code: 63180
- Geocode: 6309

Wang Chao (Thai: วังเจ้า, pronounced [wāŋ t͡ɕâːw]) is a district (amphoe) of Tak province, western Thailand.

== History ==
The minor district (king amphoe) Wang Chao was created by splitting off some parts of Mueang Tak district. It was announced on 26 June 1996 and became effective on 15 July.

On 15 May 2007, all 81 minor districts were upgraded to full districts. With publication in the Royal Gazette on 24 August the upgrade became official.

== Geography ==
Neighboring districts are (west from clockwise): Phop Phra, Mueang Tak of Tak Province, Kosamphi Nakhon, Mueang Kamphaeng Phet, Phran Kratai of Kamphaeng Phet province.

The important water resources of the district are the Ping River and Khlong Wang Chao. Part of the Khlong Wang Chao National Park is in the southern part of the district.

== Symbols ==
The district slogan is "Gateway to Tak, many different cultures, main economy is corn and longan, many beautiful waterfalls, Khlong Wang Chao national park, beautiful weaving".

== Administration ==
The district is divided into three sub-districts (tambons), which are further subdivided into 28 villages (mubans). The township (thesaban tambon) Wang Chao covers parts of tambon Chiang Thong. There are a further three tambon administrative organizations (TAO).

No.	Name	Thai name	Villages	Pop.
1.	Chiang Thong	เชียงทอง	14	16,762
2.	Na Bot	นาโบสถ์	9	9,167
3.	Pradang	ประดาง	5	3,797
