= Taksin Maharat National Park =

National park in Tak Province, Thailand

- อุทยานแห่งชาติตากสินมหาราช
- IUCN category II (national park)
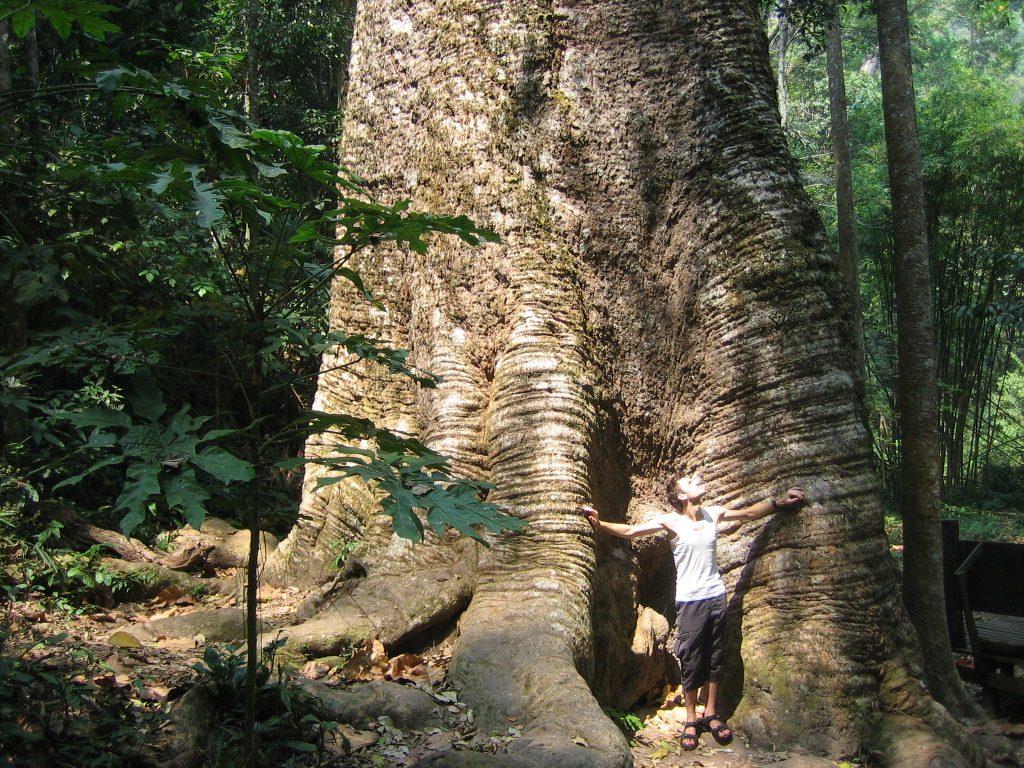
- Ton Krabak Yai

- Location within Thailand
- Location: Tak Province, Thailand
- Nearest city: Tak
- Coordinates: 16°50′21.541″N 98°52′4.296″E
- Area: 149 km^{2} (58 sq mi)
- Established: December 1981
- Visitors: 30,194 (in 2019)
- Governing body: Department of National Parks, Wildlife and Plant Conservation

Taksin Maharat National Park (Thai: อุทยานแห่งชาติตากสินมหาราช) is a national park located in Tak Province, Thailand. the park also features waterfalls, caves, and rock formations.

== History ==
The area that now forms Taksin Maharat National Park has long been known to local communities for its distinctive natural features particularly the enormous Krabak tree (Ton Krabak Yai) and a prominent natural rock bridge. The park was officially established on 23 December 1981 as Ton Krabak Yai National Park, becoming Thailand’s 38th national park.

Some historical accounts note that the surrounding region was once traversed by Burmese armies during pre-modern conflicts, though such links remain largely anecdotal. In recognition of the historical and cultural significance of King Taksin the Great of Thonburi, who is believed to have had connections to the Tak region, the park was later renamed Taksin Maharat National Park.

== Geography ==
Taksin Maharat National Park lies in Mae Sot District, Tak Province, in western Thailand, approximately 26 km west of the town of Tak (16°50′21.54″N 98°52′04.30″E). The park covers about 93,126 rai (≈149 km²) and is part of the Thanon Thongchai mountain range, a rugged highland system that dominates the park’s topography. The landscape is characterized by steep ridges, narrow valleys and small plateaus; elevations reach over 1,000 m at some peaks, features a cool upland forest conditions distinct from the surrounding.

The park contains several geomorphological and hydrological attractions, including perennial waterfalls (for example, Namtok Sam Muen Thung and Namtok Mae Ya Pa), caves with stalactite and stalagmite formations, and the natural rock bridge known locally as Saphan Hin. The forest cover is a mosaic of mixed deciduous and evergreen forest with notable dipterocarp species (including the krabak, Anisoptera costata). The park's varied terrain and watercourses support diverse flora and fauna and make it an important conservation and ecotourism area in Tak Province.

== Climate ==
Taksin Maharat National Park lies within a tropical monsoon climate zone, characterized by three distinct seasons: a hot season (March–May), a rainy season (May–October), and a cool season (November–February).

Average temperatures in the park range between 10–40 °C, with cooler conditions at higher elevations due to its terrain. The coolest months during December - January, when night temperatures can fall to around 10–15 °C in the forested highlands.

The area receives an annual rainfall of approximately 1,000–1,500 millimeters, most of which occurs between May and October under the influence of the southwest monsoon. The rainy season produces lush vegetation and higher water levels in waterfalls and streams.

During the dry season (November–April), the weather is generally clear and cooler, making it the most popular period for visitors.

== Flora and fauna ==
=== Flora ===
The forests of Taksin Maharat National Park are dominated by evergreen and mixed deciduous forest types, influenced by the park’s mountainous terrain and tropical monsoon climate. Common tree species include Dipterocarpus alatus, Shorea siamensis, Hopea odorata, and Anisoptera costata (known locally as the Krabak tree).

The park’s famous giant Krabak tree is estimated to be over 700 years old, reaching 50 meters in height and more than 16 meters in circumference, and serves as a key natural landmark and ecological heritage site.

Bamboo groves and ferns are abundant in lower elevations, while mosses and orchids thrive in higher, humid areas near waterfalls and mountain streams. During the rainy season, wildflowers and shrubs flourish, contributing to the park’s rich plant diversity.

=== Fauna ===
Taksin Maharat National Park is home to a wide variety of wildlife species, owing to its mountainous terrain, dense forests, and river valleys. The park provides habitat for several large mammals, including Asian elephants, serows, wild boar, and barking deer. Smaller mammals such as civets, porcupines, squirrels, and gibbons have also been observed within the park’s forested areas.

A 2024 herpetological study identified a diverse range of reptile species, including forest-dwelling lizards, geckos, and snakes, which are distributed across distinct habitat types throughout the park. Amphibians such as tree frogs, toads, and skinks are also commonly found near the park’s numerous streams and waterfalls.

In addition, a recent entomological survey documented eight alien ant species belonging to seven genera within human-use zones such as visitor areas and nature trails, suggesting ongoing ecological adaptation and the need for management of invasive species.

The park’s rich avian diversity includes hornbills, ashy drongo, barn swallow, black-naped oriole, collared scops owl, great barbet, greater coucal, green pigeon, olive-backed sunbird, Oriental white-eye, plaintive cuckoo, scarlet minivet, sooty-headed bulbul, spotted dove, tiger shrike, forest wagtail, and Chinese pond heron. reflecting its ecological role as part of the Western Forest Complex, one of Thailand’s largest continuous forest corridors. Migratory birds are also observed seasonally, especially during cooler months.

Taksin Maharat National Park remains an important refuge for Thailand’s native wildlife, serving as a research and conservation area under the Department of National Parks, Wildlife and Plant Conservation.

== Sights ==
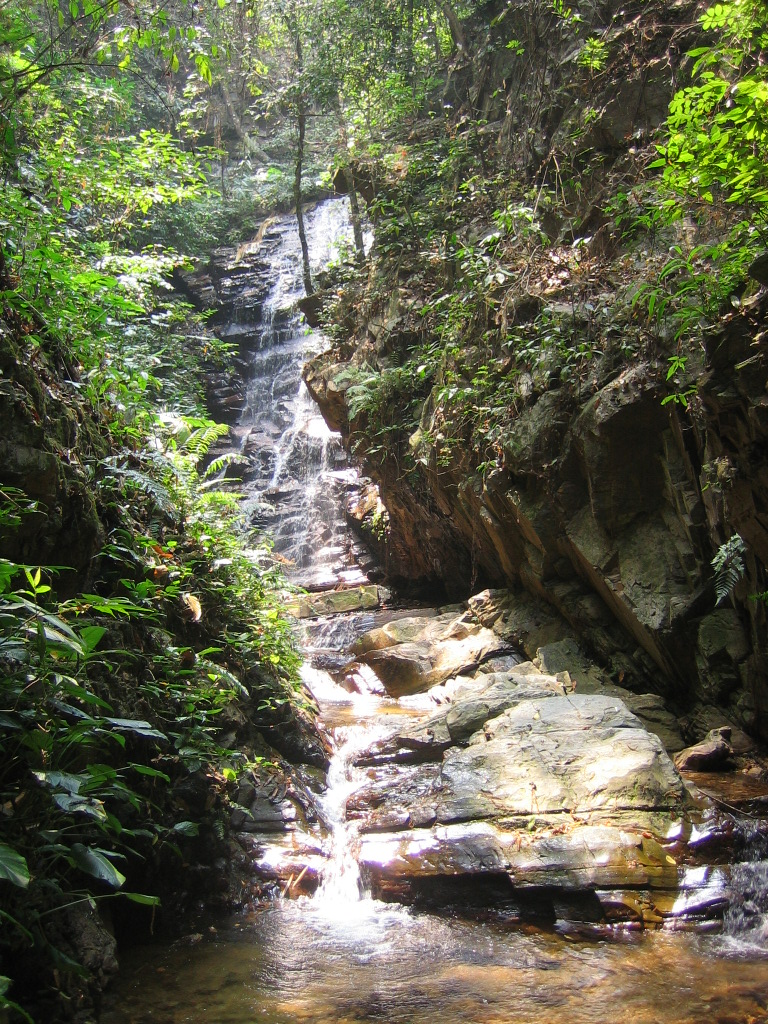
Namtok Pang A Noi

Taksin Maharat National Park is a popular ecotourism destination in Tak Province, offering a combination of large old-growth trees, waterfalls, caves, rock formations, and short nature trails that are accessible to day-visitors and overnight campers. The park’s main visitor attractions and tourism activities include:

- Ton Krabak Yai (ต้นกระบากใหญ่) the park’s most famous landmark, a very large Krabak (Anisoptera costata) tree often described as the largest Krabak in Thailand a short but steep nature trail leads from the park facilities to the tree.
- Saphan Hin (สะพานหินธรรมชาติ / Natural Stone Bridge) a natural stone bridge spanning a stream, a notable geologic formation in the park; the bridge and nearby caves with stalactites/stalagmites are included on many visitor routes.
- Waterfalls several perennial and multi-tiered waterfalls attract visitors, including Namtok Pang A Noi (น้ำตกปางอ้าน้อย), Namtok Mae Ya Pa (น้ำตกแม่ย่าป้า), and Namtok Sam Muen Thung (น้ำตกสามหมื่นทุ่ง). These waterfalls are popular for short hikes, photo stops and seasonal swimming (where permitted).
- Tran Loard Cave(ถ้ำธารลอด) located near Saphan Hin, Are destinations for short exploration and geological study featuring the stalactites and stalagmites.
- Trails, birding and camping the park maintains short nature trails (for example the Krabak Yai nature trail), viewpoints for sunrise/sunset, birdwatching and butterfly watching, and designated camping areas for overnight stays.

== Tourism ==
Taksin Maharat National Park is a popular nature destination that provides camping, lodging, and day-visit facilities for visitors. The entrance fee is 200 baht for adults and 100 baht for children. Camping areas are available on site, where visitors can bring their own tents for a small fee or rent park tents and bungalows that accommodate four to ten people. The park offers essential facilities such as restrooms, a small restaurant, and marked nature trails. Activities include bird-watching, nature study, and hiking around the famous Ton Krabak Yai tree and nearby waterfalls. The number of visitors was expected to reach several tens of thousands annually, with 30,000 recorded in 2019, reflecting the park’s growing appeal as an ecotourism destination.

The park is accessible by road via Highway 105 between Tak and Mae Sot. Travel by private car, motorbike, or hired vehicle is the most convenient option, as public transportation is limited. The main entrance lies around the 26-kilometre marker from Tak town, and is well signposted. The nearest major town is Tak, which provides accommodation and transport connections to Mae Sot Airport and nearby provinces. Visitors can enjoy scenic views along the route, and the park provides easy access to camping areas, viewpoints, and short hiking trails suitable for all ages.

== Location ==
Taksin Maharat National Park in overview PARO 14 (Tak)

8) Taksin Maharat National Park in overview PARO 14 (Tak)

	National park
1	Doi Soi Malai
2	Khun Phawo
3	Lan Sang
4	Mae Moei
5	Namtok Pha Charoen
6	Ramkhamhaeng
7	Si Satchanalai
8	Taksin Maharat

	Wildlife sanctuary
9	Mae Tuen
10	Tham Chao Ram
11	Thung Yai Naresuan East
12	Umphang
	Non-hunting area
13	Tham Chao Ram

	Forest park
14	Namtok Pa La Tha
15	Phra Tat Huai Luek
16	Tham Lom–Tham Wang
17	Tham Ta Kho Bi

== See also ==
- List of national parks of Thailand
- List of Protected Areas Regional Offices of Thailand
