= Si Satchanalai National Park =

National park in Thailand

- อุทยานแห่งชาติศรีสัชนาลัย
- IUCN category II (national park)
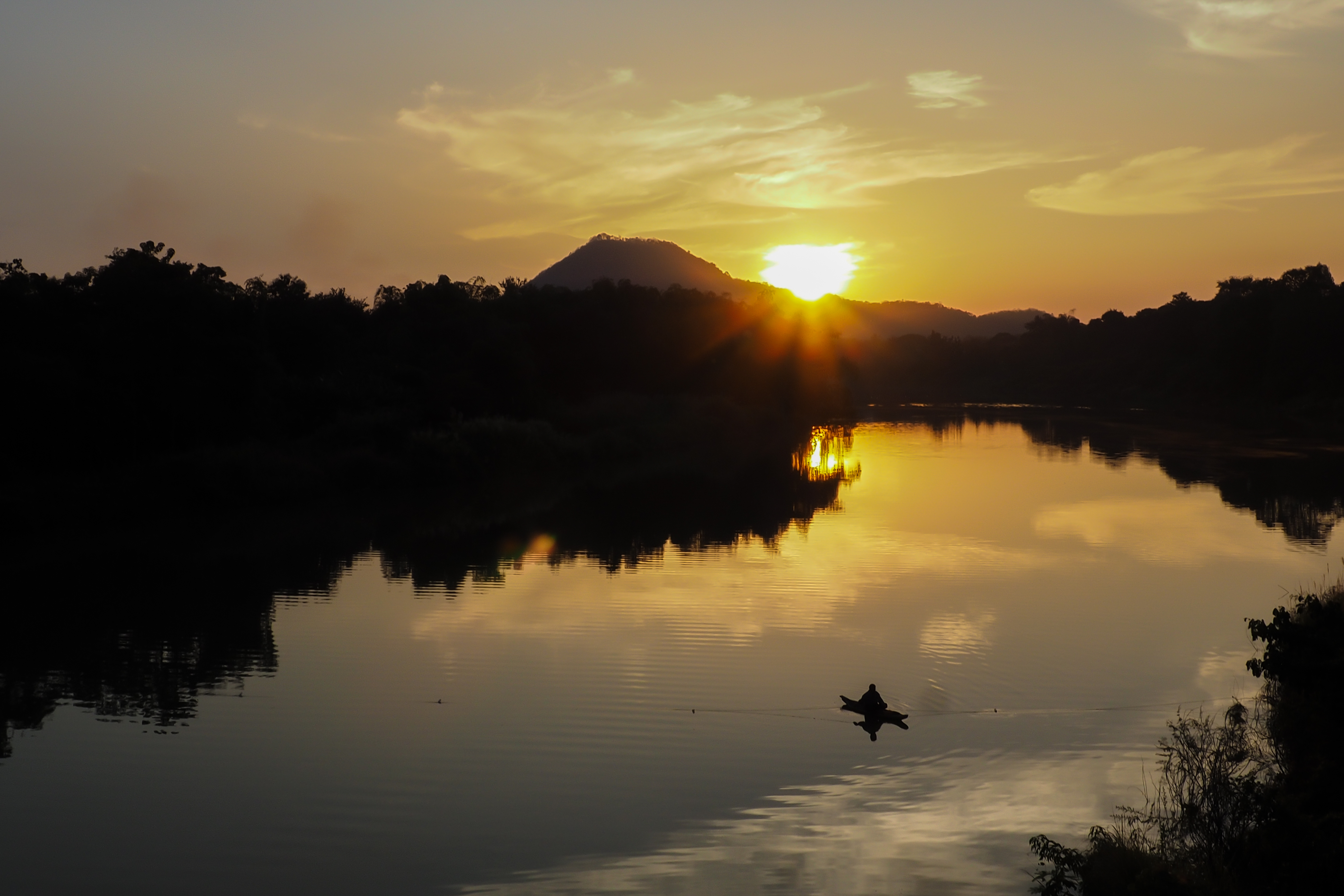

- Location within Thailand
- Location: Sukhothai Province
- Coordinates: 17°35′N 99°31′E
- Area: 213 km^{2} (82 sq mi)
- Established: 1981
- Visitors: 10,569 (in 2019)
- Governing body: Department of National Parks, Wildlife and Plant Conservation

Si Satchanalai National Park (Thai อุทยานแห่งชาติศรีสัชนาลัย) is a national park in Thailand.

== Description ==
The Si Satchanalai National Park lies in Si Satchanalai and Thung Saliam districts of Sukhothai Province, the North of Thailand.

The general geography of the national park is the complex mountains of the southern end of the Phi Pan Nam Range, lying along north–south direction, looking like a flank surrounding it, some are rocky mountains and among the high mountains in the western part, there are high cliffs, such as Doi Mae Wang Chang and Doi Mae Mok. The height of this area is between 300 and 1200 m above mean sea level. The steep slope of the ranges is an advantage for protecting the forests from being destroyed and occupied by local people.

These mountains are the source of many streams such as Huai Sai Khao, Huai Mae Tha Phae, Huai Mae San, Huai Pha Cho, Huai Manao, among others. There are some flatland areas along the shore of Huai Chang and Yom River.

== History ==
Si Satchanai National Park is the place of historical located in Thung Saliam district, Sukhothai Province. Previously, it was called Mueang Chaliang. The Royal Forest Department proclaimed it a National Park on May 8, 1981, as Thailand's 26th National Park. The total area is 133,250 rai ~ 213 square kilometres (82 sq mi). The park consists of rich forest that provide an important watershed for the surrounding agricultural area.

== Location ==
Si Satchanalai National Park in overview PARO 14 (Tak)

7) Si Satchanalai National Park in overview PARO 14 (Tak)

	National park
1	Doi Soi Malai
2	Khun Phawo
3	Lan Sang
4	Mae Moei
5	Namtok Pha Charoen
6	Ramkhamhaeng
7	Si Satchanalai
8	Taksin Maharat

	Wildlife sanctuary
9	Mae Tuen
10	Tham Chao Ram
11	Thung Yai Naresuan East
12	Umphang
	Non-hunting area
13	Tham Chao Ram

	Forest park
14	Namtok Pa La Tha
15	Phra Tat Huai Luek
16	Tham Lom–Tham Wang
17	Tham Ta Kho Bi

== See also ==
- List of national parks of Thailand
- DNP - Si Satchanalai National Park
- List of Protected Areas Regional Offices of Thailand
