= Phop Phra district =

Phop Phra พบพระ
- District
- District location in Tak province
- Coordinates: 16°23′10″N 98°41′25″E
- Country: Thailand
- Province: Tak
- Seat: Phop Phra

Area
  - Total: 1,006.542 km^{2} (388.628 sq mi)

Population (2005)
  - Total: 63,336
  - Density: 62.9/km^{2} (163/sq mi)
- Time zone: UTC+7 (ICT)
- Postal code: 63160
- Geocode: 6307

Phop Phra (Thai: พบพระ, pronounced [pʰóp pʰráʔ]) is a district (amphoe) in the southwestern part of Tak province, western Thailand.

== History ==
The area now Phop Phra was originally Tambon Chong Khaep of Mae Sot district. Due to the large size of Mae Sot and problems with communist insurgents, the government created a separate administration for the area. Effective 1 April 1977 the three tambon Phop Phra, Chong Khaep, and Khiri Rat formed a new minor district (king amphoe). It was upgraded to a full district on 3 March 1987.

== Etymology ==
The name "Phop Phra" means 'Lord Buddha image discovery'. Originally the area was named Pho Pha (เพอะพะ), which in the Karen language means 'swamp area', so the name was changed to have a more elevated meaning.

== Geography ==
Neighboring districts are (from the north clockwise) Mae Sot, Mueang Tak, and Wang Chao of Tak Province, Ban Rai of Uthai Thani province, Umphang of Tak Province, and Kayin State of Myanmar.

Namtok Pha Charoen National Park is in the district. The park is known for its Pha Charoen waterfall with 97 tiers.

The important river of Phop Phra is the Moei River.

== Language ==
The primary spoken language is central Thai. Northern Thai, Karen, Burmese, and Hmong are also spoken.

== Administration ==
The district is divided into five sub-districts (tambons), which are further subdivided into 52 villages (mubans). Phop Phra is a township (thesaban tambon), which covers parts of tambon Phop Phra.

No.	Name	Thai name	Villages	Pop.
1.	Phop Phra	พบพระ	9	12,886
2.	Chong Khaep	ช่องแคบ	14	12,064
3.	Khiri Rat	คีรีราษฎร์	11	19,567
4.	Wale	วาเล่ย์	7	6,973
5.	Ruam Thai Phatthana	รวมไทยพัฒนา	11	11,846

Subdistrict (tambon) Phop Phra is the capital of the district, with nine distinct villages. The district office is here, as well as two offices responsible for administration of the sub-district: a thesaban, responsible for interior administration, primarily for villages 1, 2, and 3, while the sub-district administrative organization (SAO) is responsible primarily for the outer villages. The outer villages are referred to as Huynamnak (4), Moonruchai (5), Moker Yang (6), Moo Jet (7), Moo Bpad (8), and Pakager (9). The thesaban and SAO often work collaboratively to distribute services to all nine villages.

== Refugee camp ==
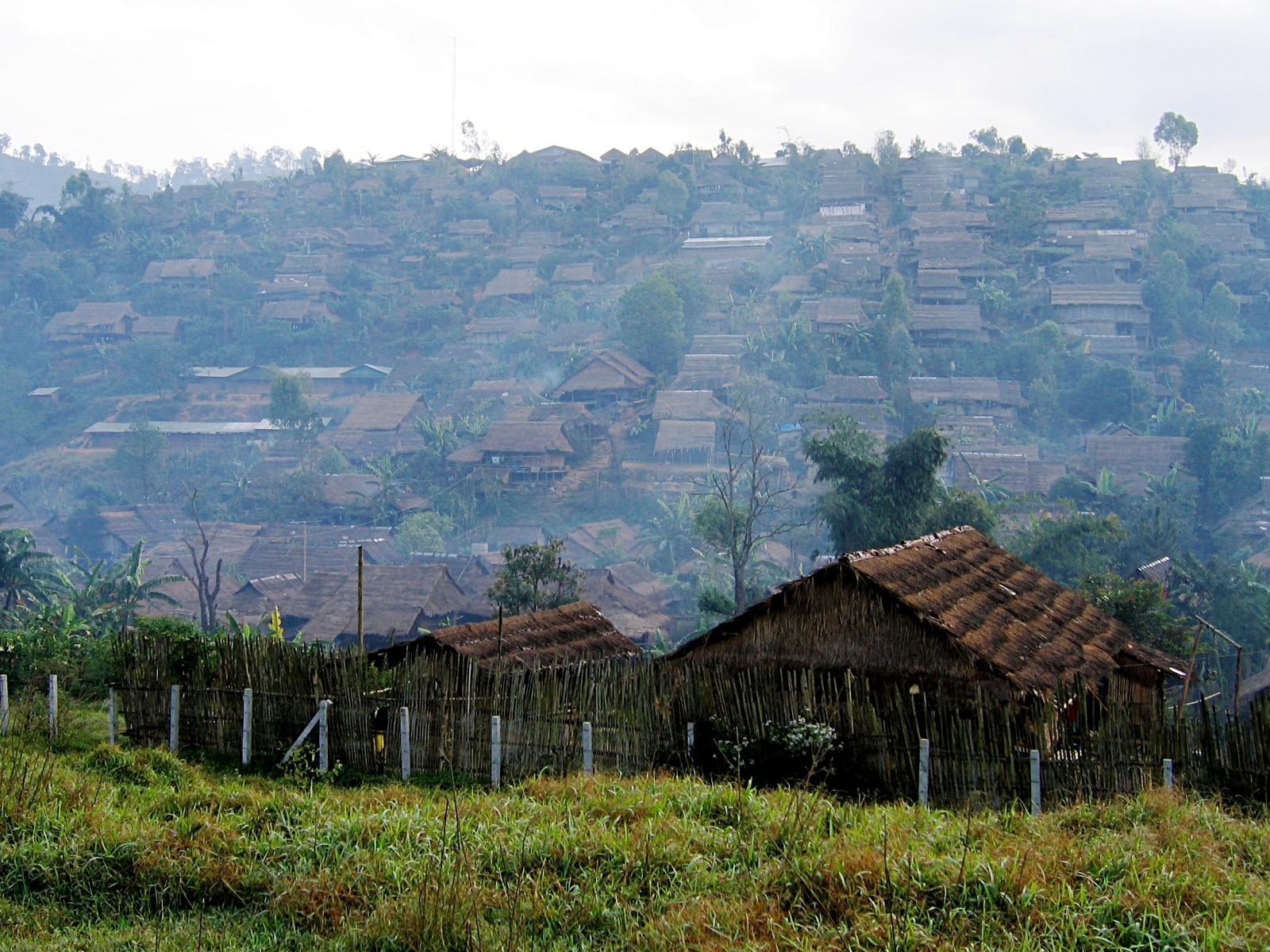
Um Piam Refugee Camp

Along Mae Sot-Umphang Highway is a refugee center, Ban Um Piam (บ้านอุ้มเปี่ยม). It houses Karen refugees from Myanmar. They were relocated from a camp in Mae Sot close to Thai-Myanmar border which risked being attacked by forces of the Democratic Karen Buddhist Army from Myanmar.

== Economy ==
The district is one of the few areas in Thailand where hemp is still cultivated. The Hmong hill people harvest the plants and use the fibers to weave traditional cloth. Hemp is a high quality fiber: flexible, strong, and durable. According to villagers, the plant can be used to produce "...clothing, fertilisers, animal feed, food supplements, drinks, cooking oil, flour, butter, beer, furniture, construction materials, packaging materials, auto parts, and bulletproof vests." On 6 January 2018, a ministerial regulation relaxing controls on the use of hemp took effect. Its use is overseen by the Office of the Narcotics Control Board's (ONCB) Institute for Narcotic Plant Survey and Monitoring. Hemp fabric has strong cultural importance as the Hmong people believe that anyone who dies without hemp fabric clothing wrapping their body will not be able to find his or her ancestors in the afterlife.
