= Mae Sot district =

Mae Sot แม่สอด ᨾᩯ᩵ᩈᩬᨯ
- District
- District location in Tak province
- Coordinates: 16°42′47″N 98°34′29″E
- Country: Thailand
- Province: Tak

Area
  - Total: 1,986.1 km^{2} (766.8 sq mi)

Population (2008)
  - Total: 120,569
  - Density: 60.71/km^{2} (157.2/sq mi)
- Time zone: UTC+7 (ICT)
- Postal code: 63110
- Geocode: 6306

Mae Sot (Northern Thai: ᨾᩯ᩵ᩈᩬᨯ; Thai: แม่สอด, pronounced [mɛ̂ː sɔ̀ːt]; Burmese: မဲဆောက်, [mɛ́ sʰaʊʔ]; Shan: မႄႈသၢႆ, [ɛ sʰaaj]; S'gaw Karen: မဲၢ်စီး) is a district in western Thailand that shares a border with Myanmar to the west, and has been described "an almost entirely Burmese town". It is notable as a trade hub and for its substantial population of Burmese migrants and refugees. The town is part of Tak province and is the main gateway between Thailand and Myanmar, and is located on the East-West Economic Corridor. As a result, it has gained notoriety for its trade in gems and teak, as well as black market services such as human trafficking and drugs. Neighbouring districts are (from north clockwise): Mae Ramat, Mueang Tak, and Phop Phra. The Moei River serves as a natural border between Mae Sot and the Burmese town of Myawaddy.

Mae Sot lies 492 km north-northwest of Bangkok.

== History ==
A 1999 collection of district histories identifies Mae Sot with Mueang Chot, the town whose ruler Khun Sam Chon attacked Tak in the account given by the Ram Khamhaeng Inscription, and treats the identification as settled. It rests the case on the shift from chot to sot and on the position of Mae Sot at the pass from the Mon country over the Thanon Thong Chai range to Tak on the Ping. Chaipong Samnieng cites the passage as an instance of local history written to fit the national frame rather than as a finding. Chit Phumisak gives the same phonetic ground for the identification, northern Thai pronouncing ch as s. He adds that a very large ruined town with abundant Sukhothai-period remains was found about 1957 on the Moei at Ban Mae Tan, northwest of Tak, which raised the possibility that Mueang Chot lay more than 50 km further north. Chit does not decide between the two, since several towns named in Sukhothai inscriptions remain unlocated. The Mae Lamao transit post, whose name survives in tambon Dan Mae La Mao, was the route by which Bayinnaung led his armies into Siam in 1563 and again in November 1568.

== Gateway to Myanmar ==
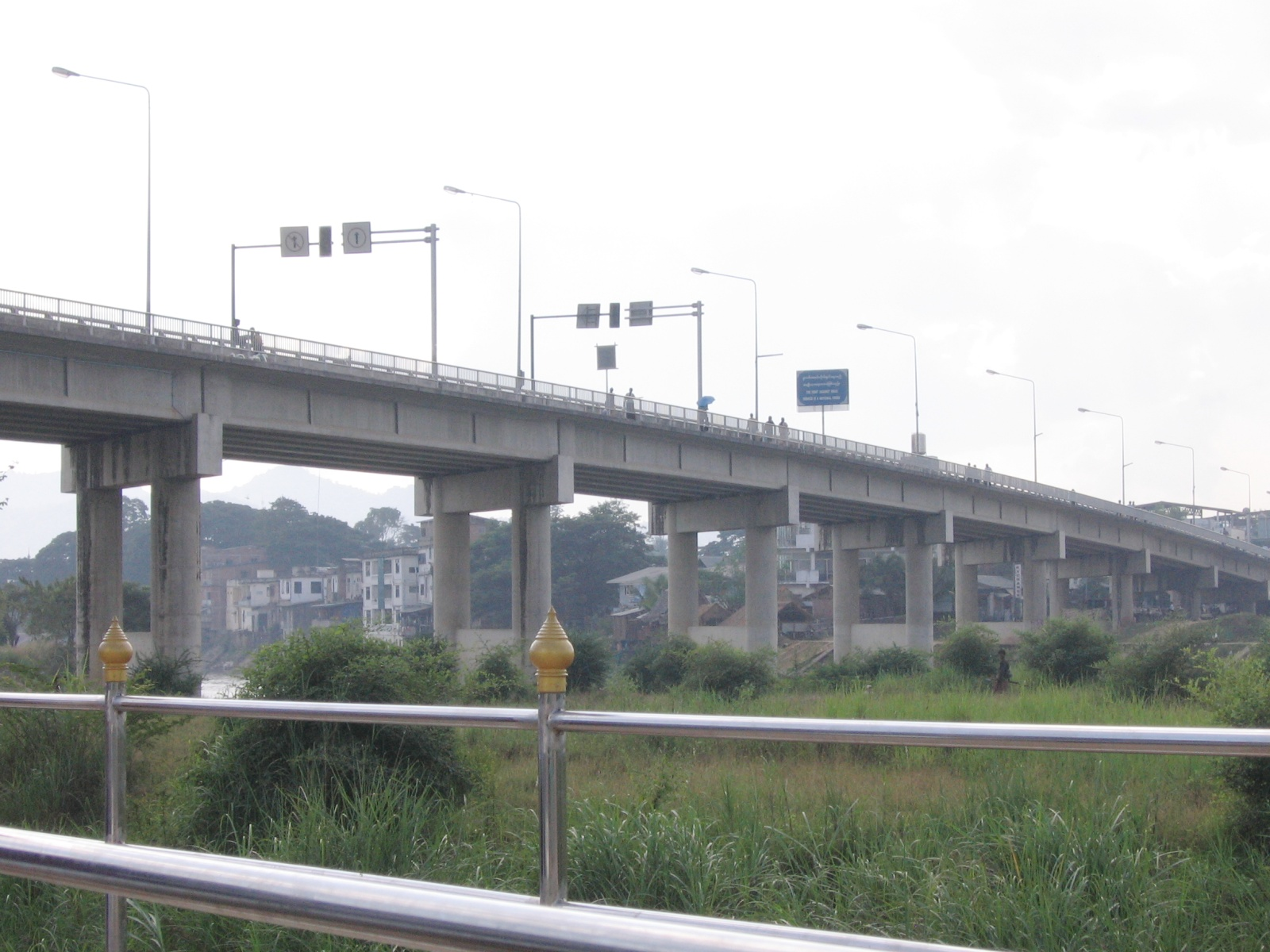
Thai-Burmese Friendship Bridge

Mae Sot is where the Asian Highway AH1 links Thailand and Myanmar. It is one of only three transnational roads and cross-border points across the Tenasserim Hills to Myanmar, along with Three Pagodas Pass and Phu Nam Ron. The Thai-Myanmar Friendship Bridge crossing the Moei River was constructed in 1997 completing the link between the two countries.

As a gateway city, Mae Sot has its own domestic airport. Some airlines such as Phuket Air have cancelled their flights between Bangkok and Mae Sot.

=== Link to India ===
India's foreign minister met with Myanmar's construction minister in Delhi on 22 February 2012, and spoke about opening a highway between Moreh, India, and the Myanmar-Thai border near Mae Sot.

== Economy ==
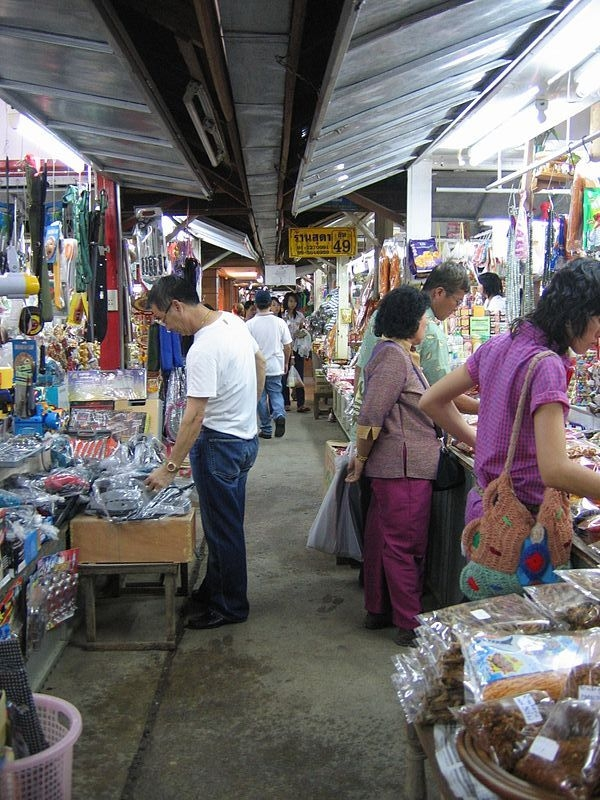
Rim Moei Market

Trade with Myanmar constitutes the largest portion of Mae Sot's economy. It has an established market for commodities such as wholesale gems and teak, as well as merchants selling bootlegged products. Most of the town's industries are supported by Burmese migrants who work in sweatshops and factories throughout the region. The Thai-Myanmar Friendship Bridge is the primary gateway for trade with Myanmar. The border region, several kilometres west from central Mae Sot, includes the Rim Moei Market that deals in imported goods and woodwork. The town is a hub of black markets in smuggling, human trafficking, and narcotics.

Zinc mining contributed to the district's economy until halted due to environmental impacts in three tambons: Phra That Pha Daeng, Mae Tao, and Mae Ku.

=== Tak Special Economic Zone ===
In early-2015 the government announced the creation of the Tak Special Economic Zone (SEZ). The SEZ, first proposed in 2004, is projected to occupy a total of 2,182 rai of forest land and public areas in tambon Tha Sai Luat. About 800 rai will be managed by the Industrial Estate Authority of Thailand and the rest by the treasury department. The government will create an industrial estate and invite companies to site factories there. Ninety-seven families who occupy land which the government intends to allocate to the SEZ—only a few of whom have land documents—will have to relocate. They are likely to be paid about 7,000-12,000 baht per rai in compensation.

There have been several attempts by previous governments to develop an SEZ in Tak as the province is a centre of border trade with Myanmar, which also connects to the Indian market. Mae Sot contributed 64 billion baht in exports in the 2015 fiscal year, a 14.8 percent increase from 2014. The SEZ will be powered by the proposed Hat Gyi Dam on the Salween River which is projected to supply about 1,500 megawatts to Thailand.

== Burmese refugees ==
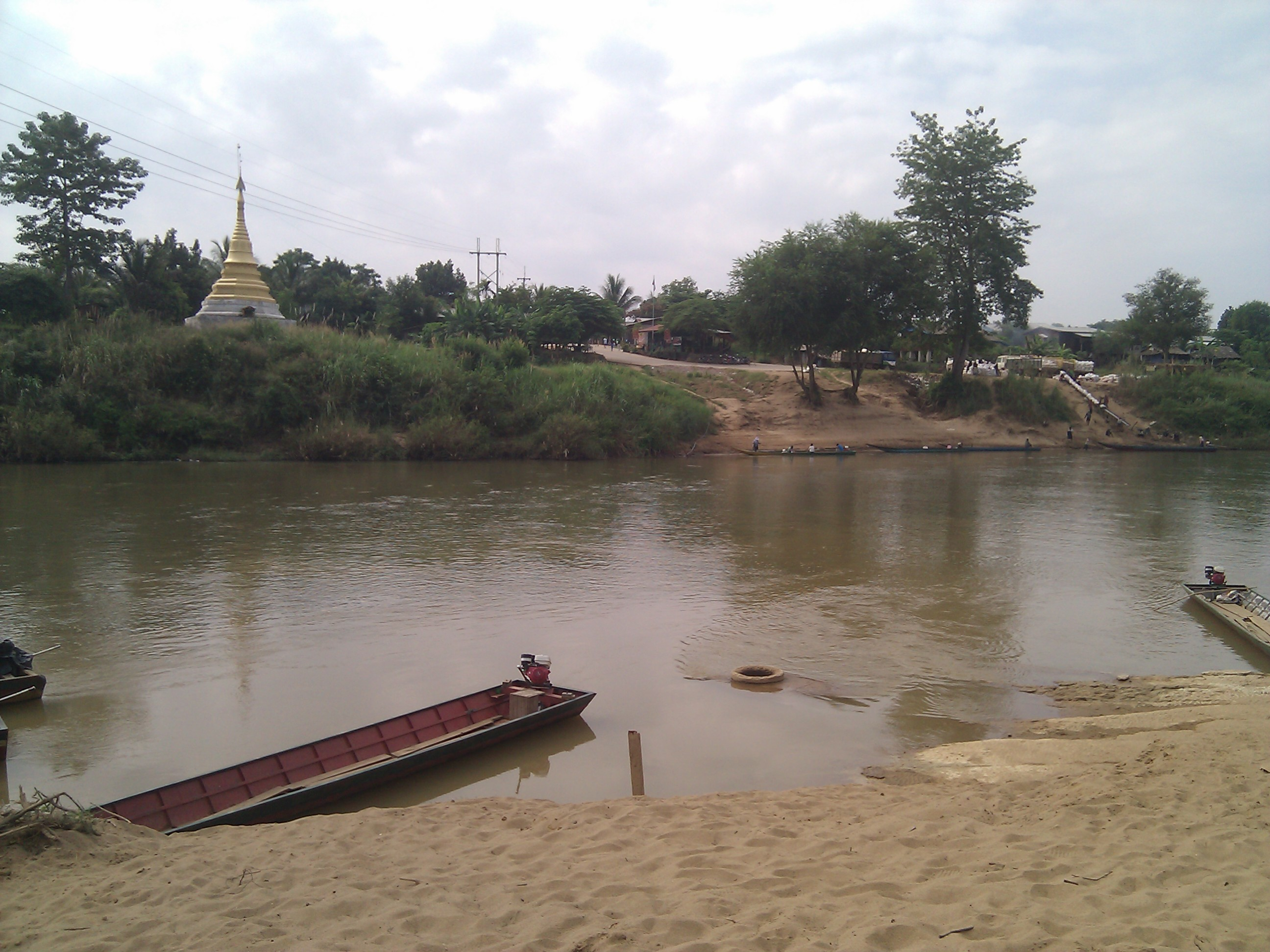
The Moei (Thai) or Thaunggin (Burmese) River

The town has a substantial population of Burmese refugees and economic migrants. The exact number of Burmese in Mae Sot is unclear, but estimates say that over 100,000 exist in addition to the 106,000 already recorded in the official census. In recent years the ongoing refugee situation has prompted NGOs and international aid agencies to establish programmes in the town and surrounding area.

One of the most notable organizations is the Mae Tao Clinic, just outside the west of town. It was established by the Burmese/Karen Dr Cynthia Maung to offer free medical services to Burmese who do not qualify for treatment at the Mae Sot Hospital. The centre is funded independently and is supported by teams of volunteers.

The Mae Sot region has around 70 migrant schools that started spontaneously to meet the needs of the 30,000 children who have crossed the border with their parents from Myanmar. The students are a mix of refugees and economic migrants. Of this number only 7,000 currently attend school. The schools range in size from 20 to over 650 students (Hsa Thoo Lei School). These schools receive no support from the Thai government and rely solely on their resourcefulness and international support.

=== Human rights abuses ===
Serious human rights abuses have been reported here and in the province, whereby local Thai police collude with local business and mafia in trafficking Burmese slave labour, after decades of massive refugee camps accumulating on the Thai side of the border.

== Administration ==
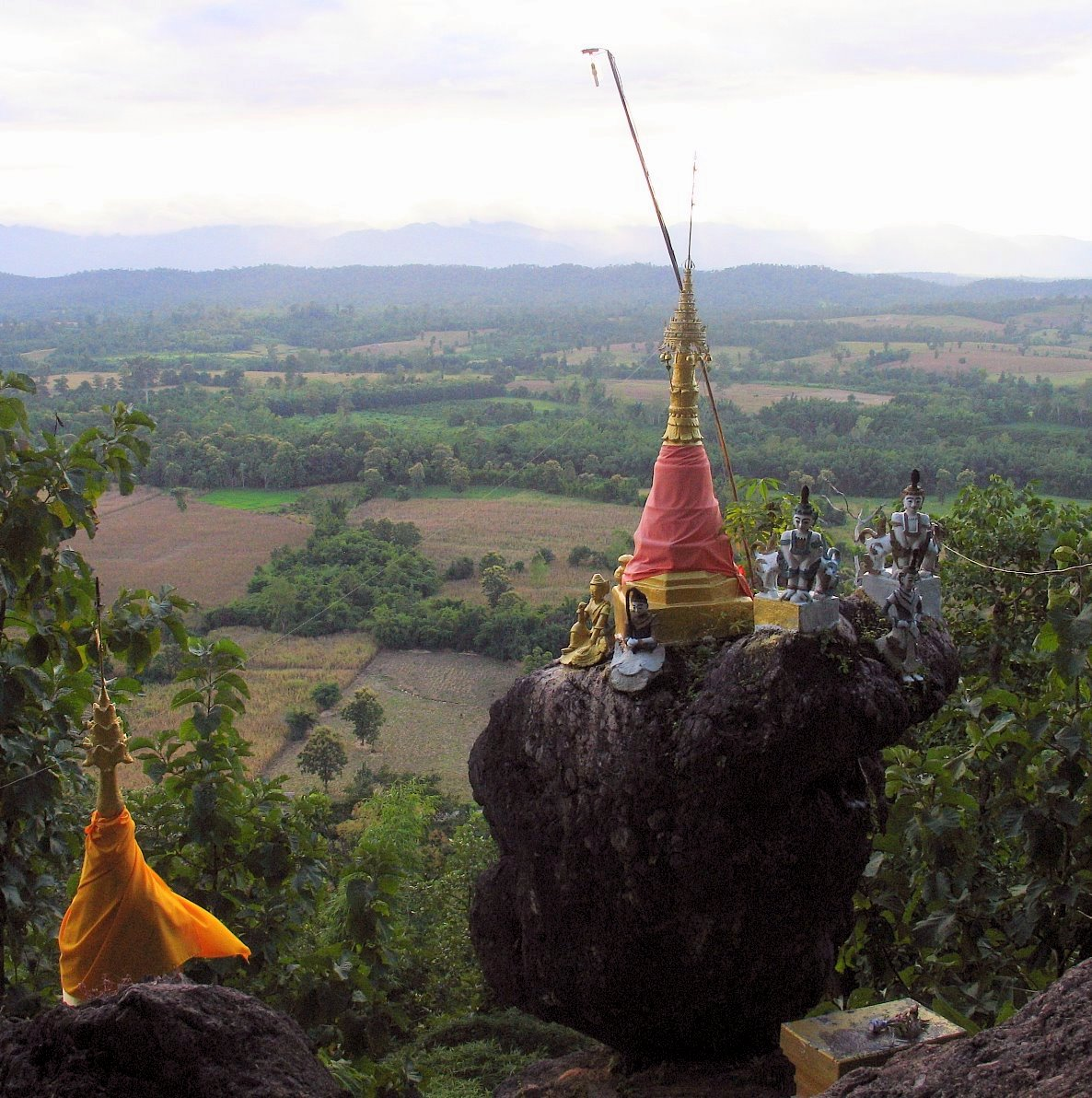
A sacred balancing rock at Wat Phra That Doi Din Chi, overlooking the border river

The district (amphoe) Mae Sot is divided into 10 sub-districts (tambons), which are further subdivided into 86 villages (mubans). The city (thesaban nakhon) Mae Sot covers the whole tambon Mae Sot. Tha Sai Luat and Mae Ku are sub-district municipalities (thesaban tambon). There are a further nine tambon administrative organizations (TAO).

No.	Name	Thai name
1.	Mae Sot	แม่สอด	6.	Tha Sai Luat	ท่าสายลวด
2.	Mae Ku	แม่กุ	7.	Mae Pa	แม่ปะ
3.	Phawo	พะวอ	8.	Mahawan	มหาวัน
4.	Mae Tao	แม่ตาว	9.	Dan Mae La Mao	ด่านแม่ละเมา
5.	Mae Kasa	แม่กาษา	10.	Phra That Pha Daeng	พระธาตุผาแดง

There are plans to create a new province centered in Mae Sot, covering the five border districts of Tak Province. Additionally the town is planned to be converted into a metropolis, covering tambons Mae Sot, Mae Pa, and Tha Sai Luat.
