= Tak, Thailand =

Tak ตาก
- Town
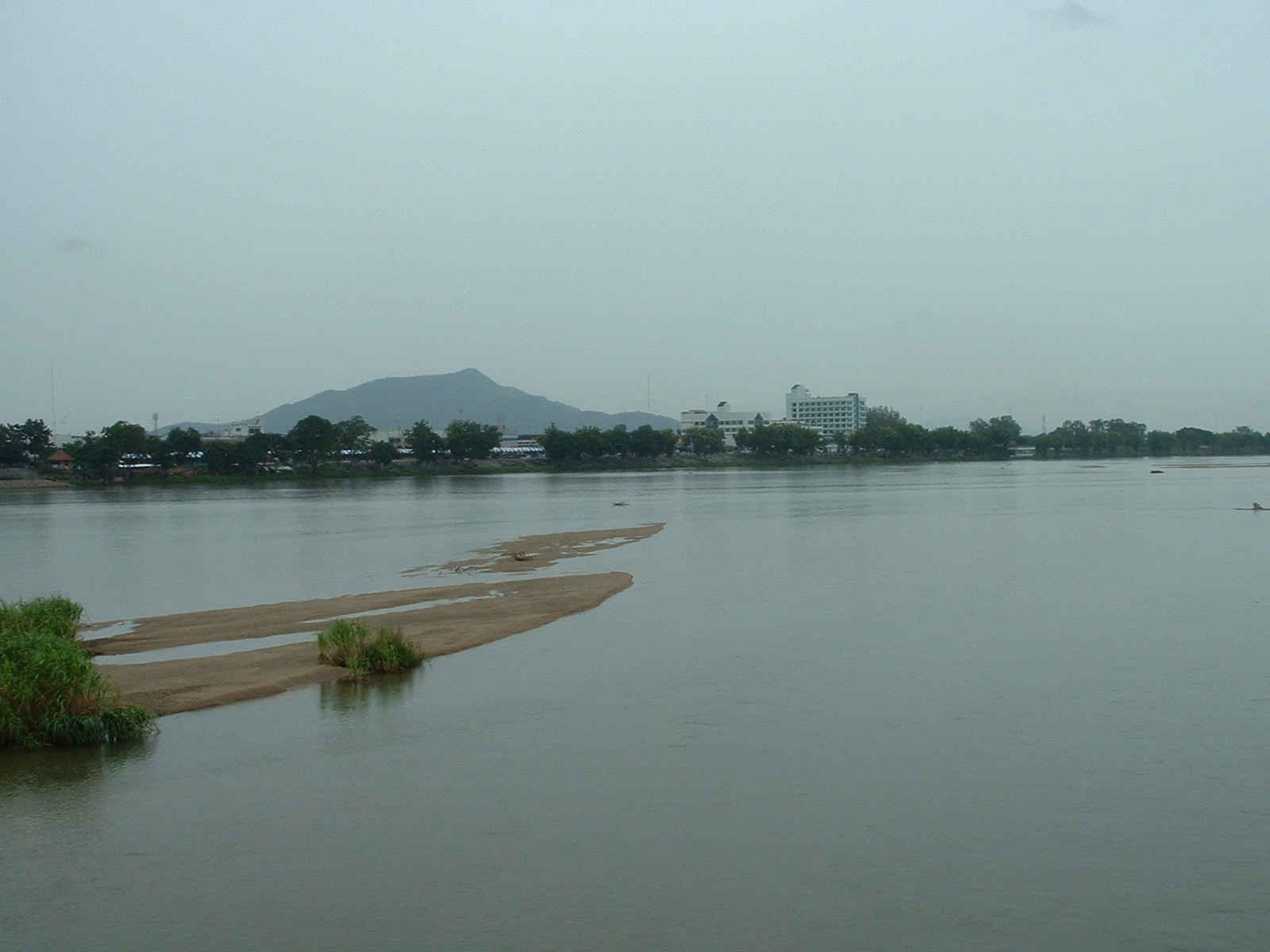
- Ping River, Tak

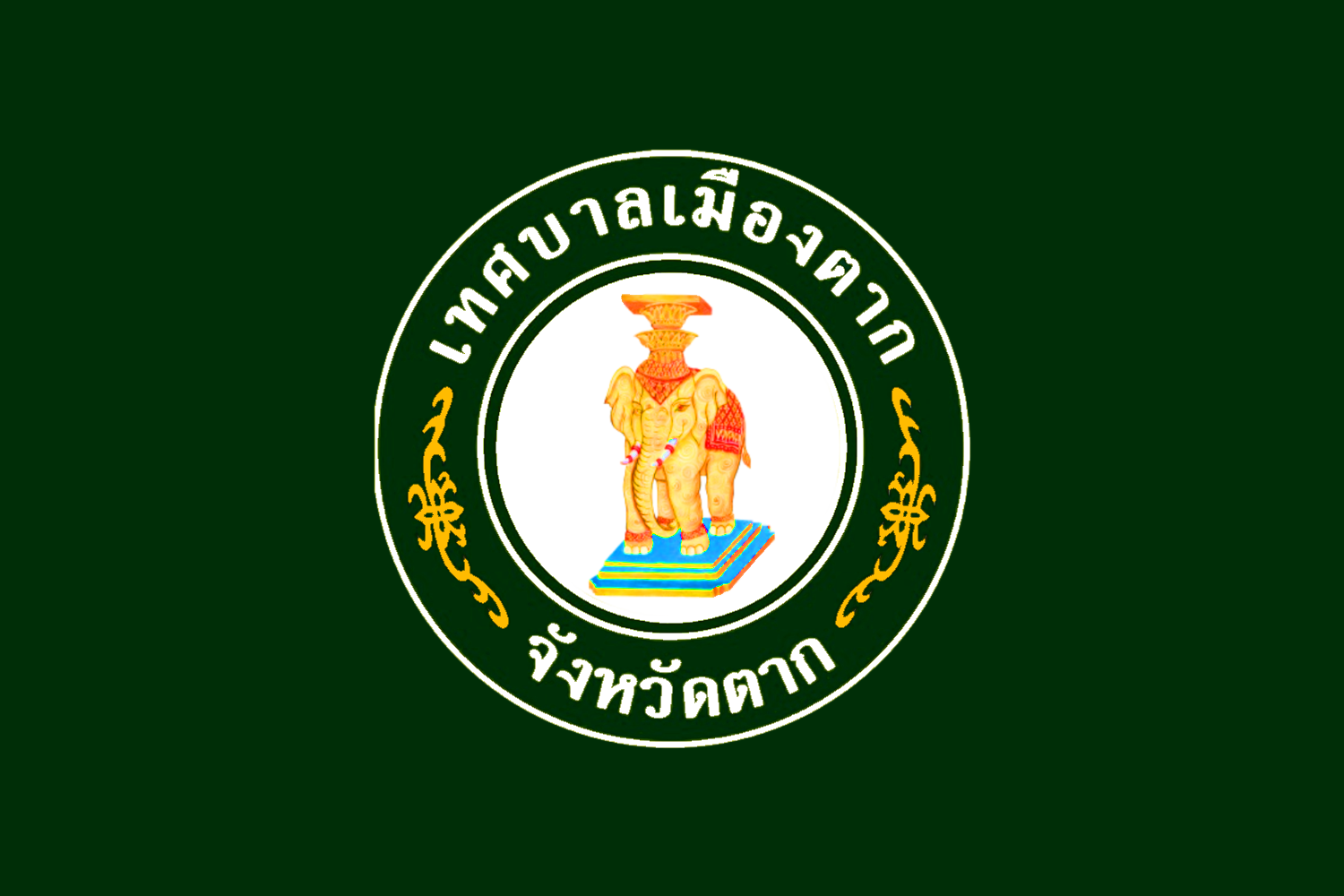
- Flag

- Location within Thailand
- Coordinates: 16°52′16″N 99°07′30″E
- Country: Thailand
- Province: Tak
- Amphoe: Mueang Tak

Area
  - Total: 7.27 km^{2} (2.81 sq mi)

Population (2017)
  - Total: 20,290
  - Density: 2,790.9/km^{2} (7,228/sq mi)
- Time zone: UTC+7 (ICT)

Tak (Thai: ตาก, pronounced [tàːk]) is a town (thesaban mueang) in north-west Thailand, capital of the Tak Province and the Tak district. As of 2005 the town had a population of 19,900 and an area of 7.27 km^{2}. It covers the tambon Rahaeng, Nong Luang, Chiang Ngoen, and Hua Diat. It is on the Ping River, 418 km north-north-west of Bangkok.

== Geography ==
Tak is on the Ping River, which runs from north to south through the town. While the land to the east is fairly flat, the Tenasserim Hills and Dawna Range lie to the west.

== Climate ==
Tak has a tropical savanna climate (Köppen climate classification Aw). Winters are dry and very warm. Temperatures rise until April, which is very hot with the average daily maximum at 38.5 °C (101.3 °F). On 15 April 2023, Tak measured the highest temperature ever recorded in Thailand, reaching 45.4 °C (113.7 °F), the first time that Thailand recorded a temperature over 45 °C (113 °F). The monsoon season runs from May through October, with heavy rain and somewhat cooler temperatures during the day, although nights remain warm.

Climate data for Tak (1991–2020, extremes 1954-present)
Month	Jan	Feb	Mar	Apr	May	Jun	Jul	Aug	Sep	Oct	Nov	Dec	Year
Record high °C (°F)	38.0 (100.4)	41.2 (106.2)	42.7 (108.9)	44.6 (112.3)	43.8 (110.8)	40.3 (104.5)	37.9 (100.2)	38.2 (100.8)	38.4 (101.1)	38.2 (100.8)	37.6 (99.7)	36.6 (97.9)	44.6 (112.3)
Mean daily maximum °C (°F)	32.4 (90.3)	35.2 (95.4)	37.6 (99.7)	38.5 (101.3)	35.6 (96.1)	33.5 (92.3)	32.6 (90.7)	32.3 (90.1)	32.8 (91.0)	32.0 (89.6)	31.8 (89.2)	31.0 (87.8)	33.8 (92.8)
Daily mean °C (°F)	24.5 (76.1)	27.2 (81.0)	30.3 (86.5)	31.5 (88.7)	30.0 (86.0)	28.8 (83.8)	28.3 (82.9)	28.0 (82.4)	28.0 (82.4)	27.0 (80.6)	25.8 (78.4)	23.8 (74.8)	27.8 (82.0)
Mean daily minimum °C (°F)	17.9 (64.2)	19.9 (67.8)	24.1 (75.4)	26.4 (79.5)	26.2 (79.2)	25.8 (78.4)	25.4 (77.7)	25.2 (77.4)	24.8 (76.6)	23.5 (74.3)	21.1 (70.0)	18.2 (64.8)	23.2 (73.8)
Record low °C (°F)	4.7 (40.5)	9.2 (48.6)	11.0 (51.8)	18.5 (65.3)	20.5 (68.9)	21.7 (71.1)	20.5 (68.9)	20.2 (68.4)	19.5 (67.1)	15.1 (59.2)	9.3 (48.7)	5.8 (42.4)	4.7 (40.5)
Average precipitation mm (inches)	9.0 (0.35)	6.7 (0.26)	19.5 (0.77)	58.2 (2.29)	170.1 (6.70)	116.4 (4.58)	100 (3.9)	118.1 (4.65)	220.6 (8.69)	190.1 (7.48)	34.1 (1.34)	6.2 (0.24)	1,049 (41.3)
Average precipitation days (≥ 1.0 mm)	0.8	0.6	1.5	4.3	10.7	11.3	11.7	11.4	12.7	11.1	2.8	0.8	79.7
Average relative humidity (%)	66.0	55.6	50.7	55.4	67.6	72.8	73.4	74.6	77.6	81.5	76.7	71.8	68.6
Mean monthly sunshine hours	275.9	259.9	275.9	243.0	217.0	117.0	120.9	117.8	108.0	179.8	219.0	257.3	2,391.5
Source 1: World Meteorological Organization
Source 2: Office of Water Management and Hydrology, Royal Irrigation Department (sun 1981–2010) (extremes)

== Transportation ==
Route 105, through Mae Sot, forms one of two major transnational roads through the Tenasserim Hills to Burma. Route 1, also known as the Phahonyothin Road, passes through Tak. On the north side it leads to Lampang, Chiang Rai, and the border with Burma at Mae Sai. On the south side it leads to Kamphaeng Phet, Nakhon Sawan, and Bangkok. Route 12 leads east to Sukhothai, Phitsanulok, Chum Phae, Khon Kaen, Kalasin, and the border with Laos at Mukdahan.

Tak is served by Tak Airport, 13 kilometres (8.1 mi) east of the town.
