= Mae Moei National Park =

National park in Thailand

- IUCN category II (national park)

- Park location in Thailand
- Location: Thailand
- Nearest city: Mae Sot
- Coordinates: 17.47°N 98.11°E
- Area: 197 km^{2} (76 sq mi)
- Established: 1999
- Governing body: Department of National Parks, Wildlife and Plant Conservation

Mae Moei National Park is a national park in Tak province, Thailand. The park is home to waterfalls and caves.

== Geography ==
Mae Moei National Park is in Tha Song Yang district of Tak province. It is about 130 km (80 mi) north of Mae Sot. The park's area is 197 km^{2} (76 sq mi), with an average elevation of 680 m (2,200 ft) and a peak of 1,250 m (4,100 ft). It borders Myanmar on its western side.

== Attractions ==
Mae Usu Cave is home to an underground river and stalagmites and stalactites. Mae Salit Noi and Chao Doi waterfalls are within the park. There is a popular viewpoint at Mon Kio Lom at an elevation of 1,100 m (3,600 ft).

According to local legend, the cave is said to be the dwelling place of a saming, a legendary creature believed to be a human capable of transforming into a fierce tiger. According to the beliefs of the local S'gaw people, on every full-moon night, loud commotion or the sound of traditional Thai music can be heard coming from deep inside the cave. It is believed that these sounds are caused by the saming. According to the legend, the saming once devoured a man. Afterwards, the man's lover came to sit and weep in front of the cave. Feeling remorseful, the saming emerged from the cave, took responsibility for what had happened, and promised to look after her for the rest of her life.

== Flora and fauna ==
The park is home to forest types including montane rainforest, pine forest, dipterocarp forest, deciduous forest and evergreen forest. Plant species in the park include Afzelia xylocarpa, Lagerstroemia calyculata, Shorea obtusa, Xylia xylocarpa and the endangered teak tree (Tectona grandis).

The park hosts animals including muntjac and palm civet. Birds in the park include trogon, bulbul, barbet, minivet, tailorbird and sunbird. The park is the only known habitat in Thailand of the rufous-headed parrotbill.
