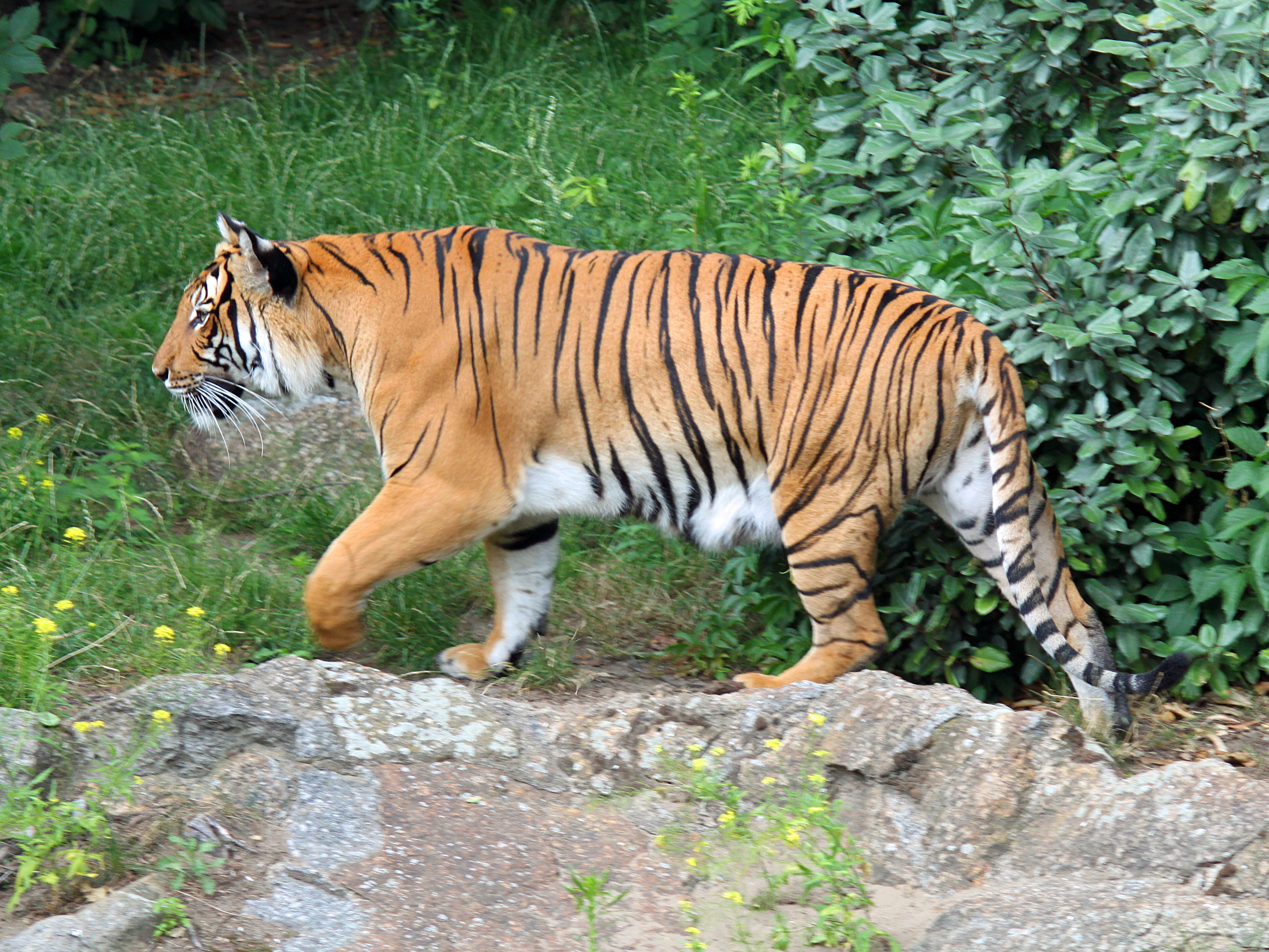
- Indochinese tiger at the Berlin Zoological Garden

Scientific classification
- Kingdom: Animalia
- Phylum: Chordata
- Class: Mammalia
- Order: Carnivora
- Family: Felidae
- Genus: Panthera
- Species: P. tigris
- Subspecies: P. t. tigris
- Population: Indochinese tiger
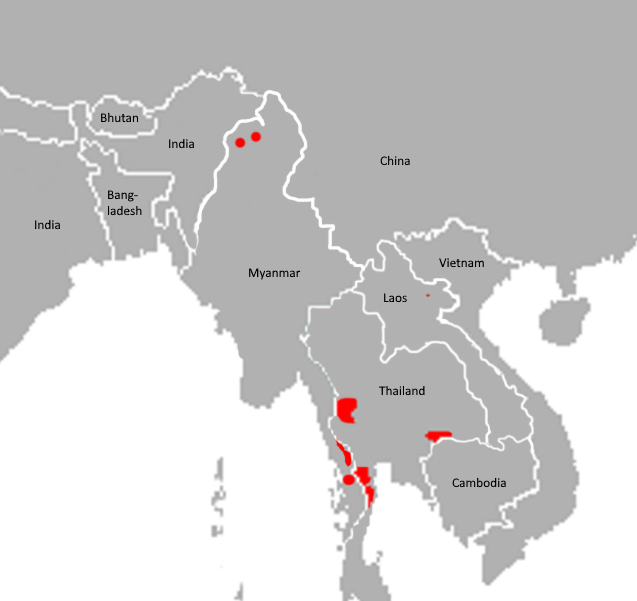
- Distribution of the Indochinese tiger

= Indochinese tiger =

Tiger population in Southeast Asia

The Indochinese tiger is a population of Panthera tigris tigris that is native to mainland Southeast Asia. This population occurs in Myanmar and Thailand. In 2011, the population was thought to comprise 342 individuals, with the largest population unit surviving in Thailand, estimated at 189 to 252 individuals during the period 2009 to 2014; 85 more tigers were present in Myanmar at the time.

== Taxonomy ==
Panthera tigris corbetti was proposed as a scientific name for this specific population by Vratislav Mazák in 1968 based on skin colouration, marking pattern, and skull dimensions. It was named in honor of Jim Corbett.

In 2017, the Cat Classification Task Force of the Cat Specialist Group revised felid taxonomy and now recognizes the tiger populations of mainland South and Southeast Asia as belonging to the nominate subspecies P. tigris tigris. Results of a genetic study published in 2018 supported six monophyletic clades based on whole genome sequencing analysis of 32 tiger specimens. The specimens from Malaysia and Indochina appeared to be distinct from other mainland Asian populations, thus supporting the concept of six living subspecies.

== Characteristics ==
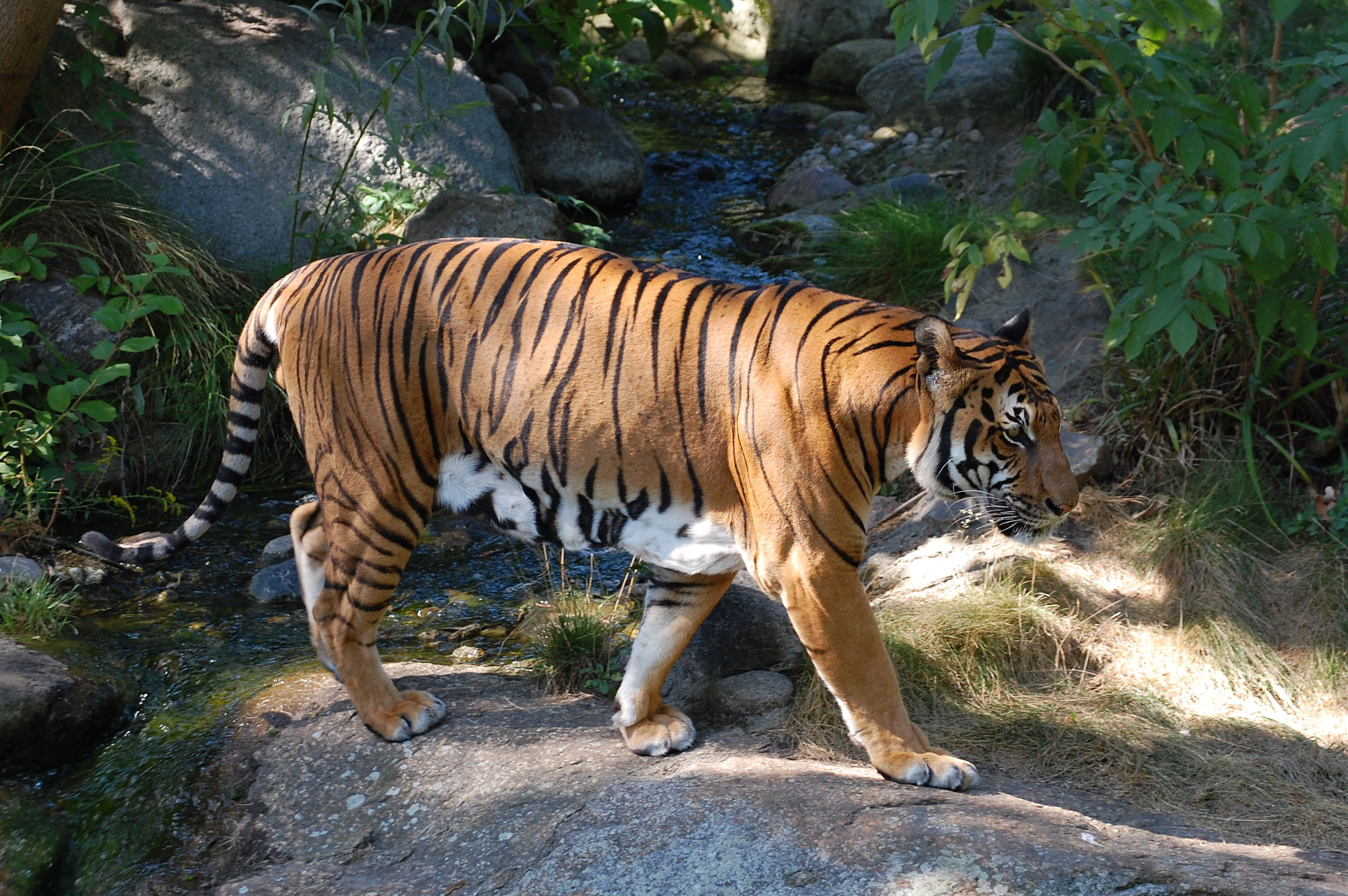
Young Indochinese tiger

The Indochinese tiger's ground colouration is darker, with more rather short and narrow single stripes; its skull is smaller than that of the Bengal tiger. Eleven Indochinese tiger skins in the collection of the Natural History Museum, London, have 21–31 stripes. In body size, it is smaller than the Bengal and Siberian tigers. Males range in size from 255 to 285 cm (100 to 112 in) and in weight, from 150 to 195 kg (331 to 430 lb). Females range in size from 230 to 255 cm (91 to 100 in) and in weight, from 100 to 130 kg (220 to 290 lb).

== Distribution and habitat ==
The Indochinese tiger is distributed in Myanmar, Thailand and Laos. Its historical range also included Cambodia, southern China and Vietnam. Results of a phylogeographic study, using 134 tiger samples across the global range, suggest that the historical northwestern distribution limit of the Indochinese tiger is the region in the Chittagong Hill Tracts and Brahmaputra River basin, bordering the range of the Bengal tiger.

In Myanmar, surveys were conducted between 1999 and 2002, confirming the presence of tigers in the Hukawng Valley, Htamanthi Wildlife Sanctuary and in two small areas in the Tanintharyi Region. The Tenasserim Hills is an important area, but forests are harvested there. In 2015, tigers were recorded by camera traps for the first time in the hill forests of Kayin State. Camera trap surveys between 2016 and 2018 revealed about 22 adult individuals in three sites that represent 8% of the potential tiger habitat in the country.

More than half of the total Indochinese tiger population survives in the Western Forest Complex in Thailand, especially in the area of the Huai Kha Khaeng Wildlife Sanctuary. The Western Forest Complex is Thailand's largest conservation area, and is home to 75-80% of Thailand's Tiger population. This habitat consists of tropical and subtropical moist broadleaf forests. Camera trap surveys from 2008 to 2017 in eastern Thailand detected about 17 adult tigers in an area of 4,445 km^{2} (1,716 sq mi) in Dong Phayayen–Khao Yai Forest Complex. Several individuals had cubs. The population density in Thap Lan National Park, Pang Sida National Park and Dong Yai Wildlife Sanctuary was estimated at 0.32–1.21 individuals per 100 km^{2} (39 sq mi). Three subadult tigers were photographed in spring 2020 in a remote region of Thailand that are thought to be dispersing. As of 2025, 20 to 30 tigers were thought to live in Dong Phayayen–Khao Yai Forest Complex. The Indochinese tiger now only survives in Myanmar and Thailand.

In Laos, 14 tigers were documented in Nam Et-Phou Louey National Park during surveys from 2013 to 2017, covering four blocks of about 200 km^{2} (77 sq mi) semi-evergreen and evergreen forest that are interspersed with some patches of grassland. More recent surveys have failed to detect any tigers, and the likelihood is that they have been extirpated as a result of poaching, fueled by demand from China. In 2016, it was reported that only two tigers were left in Laos. However, neither of these two individuals has been seen since 2013; they vanished from Nam Et-Phou Louey National Park and are thought to have been killed by poachers using snares or a gun.

In eastern Cambodia, tigers were last recorded in Mondulkiri Protected Forest and Virachey National Park during surveys between 1999 and 2007. In 2016, the Cambodian government declared that the tiger was "functionally extinct". In April 2023, India signed a memorandum of understanding with Cambodia to assist the country with the tiger's reintroduction. At least 90 acres (36 ha) of the Cardamom Mountains of Tatai Wildlife Sanctuary could be used to host Bengal tigers.

In Vietnam, the Indochinese tiger occurred in 17 provinces before the 1960s. It was still present in 14 protected areas in the 1990s, but has not been recorded in the country since 1997. As of 2014, the tiger is possibly extinct in Vietnam.

In China, it occurred historically in Yunnan province and Mêdog County, where it probably does not survive today. In Yunnan's Shangyong Nature Reserve, three individuals were detected during surveys carried out from 2004 to 2009.

== Behaviour and ecology ==
In Thailand's Huai Kha Khaeng Wildlife Sanctuary, seven female and four male tigers were equipped with GPS radio collars between June 2005 and August 2011. Females had a mean home range of 70.2 ± 33.2 km^{2} (27.1 ± 12.8 sq mi) and males of 267.6 ± 92.4 km^{2} (103.3 ± 35.7 sq mi).

Between 2013 and 2015, 11 prey species were identified at 150 kill sites. They ranged in weight from 3 to 287 kg (6.6 to 632.7 lb). Sambar deer, banteng, gaur, and wild boar were most frequently killed, but also remains of Asian elephant calves, hog badger, Old World porcupine, muntjac, serow, pangolin, and langur species were identified.

== Threats ==
The primary threat to the tiger is poaching for the illegal wildlife trade. Tiger bone has been an ingredient in traditional Chinese medicine for more than 1,500 years and is either added to medicinal wine, used in the form of powder, or boiled to a glue-like consistency. More than 40 different formulae containing tiger bone were produced by at least 226 Chinese companies in 1993. Tiger bone glue is a popular medicine among urban Vietnamese consumers.

Between 1970 and 1993, South Korea imported 607 kg (1,338 lb) of tiger bones from Thailand and 2,415 kg (5,324 lb) from China between 1991 and 1993. Between 2001 and 2010, wildlife markets were surveyed in Myanmar, Thailand, and Laos. During 13 surveys, 157 body parts of tigers were found, representing at least 91 individuals. Whole skins were the most commonly traded parts. Bones, paws, and penises were offered as aphrodisiacs in places with a large sex industry. Tiger bone wine was offered foremost in shops catering to Chinese customers. Traditional medicine accounted for a large portion of products sold and exported to China, Laos, and Vietnam.

Between 2000 and 2011, 641 tigers, both live and dead, were seized in 196 incidents in Thailand, Laos, Vietnam, Cambodia, and China; 275 tigers were suspected to have leaked into trade from captive facilities. China was the most common destination of the seized tigers.

In Myanmar's Hukaung Valley, the Yuzana Corporation, alongside local authorities, has expropriated more than 200,000 acres (81,000 ha) of land from more than 600 households since 2006. Much of the trees have been logged, and the land has been transformed into plantations. Some of the land taken by the Yazana Corporation had been deemed tiger transit corridors. These are areas of land that were supposed to be left untouched by development in order to allow the region's Indochinese tigers to travel between protected pockets of reservation land.

== Conservation ==
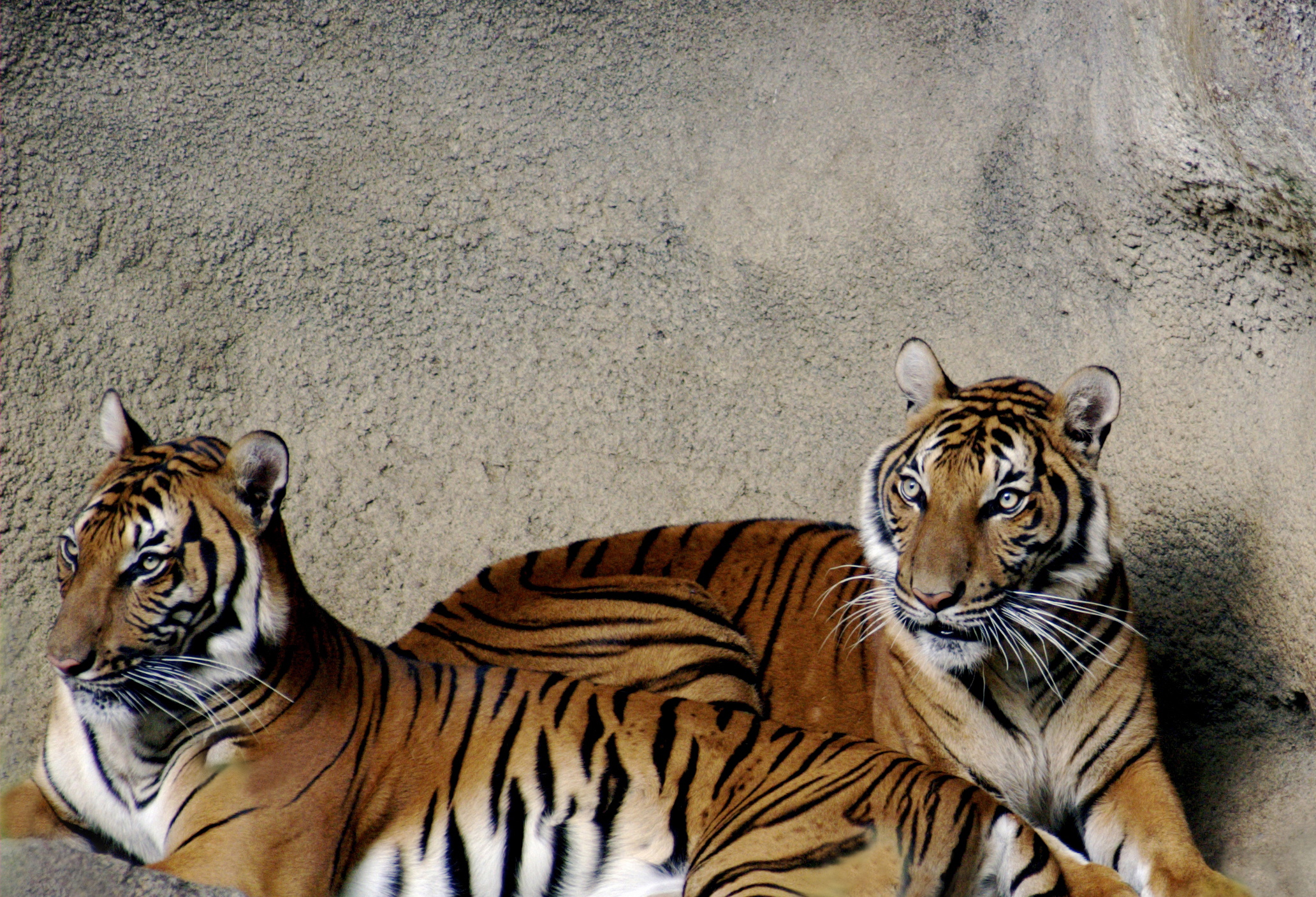
Two tigers at Cincinnati Zoo

Since 1993, the Indochinese tiger has been listed on CITES Appendix I, making international trade illegal. China, South Korea, Vietnam, Singapore, and Taiwan banned trade in tigers and sale of medicinal derivatives. Manufacture of tiger-based medicine was banned in China, and the open sale of tiger-based medicine reduced significantly since 1995.

Patrolling in Thailand's Huai Kha Khaeng Wildlife Sanctuary has been intensified since 2006 so that poaching appears to have been reduced, resulting in a marginal improvement of tiger survival and recruitment. By autumn 2016, at least two individuals had dispersed to adjacent Mae Wong National Park; six cubs were observed in Mae Wong and the contiguous Khlong Lan National Park in 2016, indicating that the population was breeding and recovering.

The Indochinese tiger population is considered Endangered in Thailand and Laos, and Critically Endangered in Vietnam and Myanmar.

=== In captivity ===
The Indochinese tiger is the least represented in captivity and is not part of a coordinated breeding program. As of 2007, 14 individuals were recognized as Indochinese tigers based on genetic analysis of 105 captive tigers in 14 countries.

== See also ==
- Tiger populations
  - Mainland Asian populations
    - Bengal tiger
    - Caspian tiger
    - Malayan tiger
    - Siberian tiger
    - South China tiger
  - Sunda island populations
    - Bali tiger
    - Bornean tiger
    - Javan tiger
    - Sumatran tiger
  - Prehistoric tigers: Panthera tigris soloensis
  - Panthera tigris trinilensis
  - Panthera tigris acutidens
- Holocene extinction
