= Tatai Wildlife Sanctuary =

Protected area in Cambodia

- ដែនជម្រកសត្វព្រៃតាតៃ
- Location within Cambodia Location within Southeast Asia
- Location: Koh Kong province
- Coordinates: 11°11′31″N 103°28′35″E
- Area: 1,442.75 km^{2} (557.05 sq mi)
- Established: 9 May 2016
- Governing body: Ministry of Environment (Cambodia)

Tatai Wildlife Sanctuary (Khmer: ដែនជម្រកសត្វព្រៃតាតៃ) is a protected area in southwest Cambodia created in 2016, covering 144,275 ha (356,510 acres). Located in the Cardamom Mountains, the area is threatened by sand dredging and processing, by the filling-in of water bodies, and by land-grabbing. In 2021, 26,103 ha (64,500 acres) were cut from the wildlife sanctuary in a PADDD event. Local communities have been displaced into the protected area from nearby areas following the creation of the 246-megawatt Stung Tatai hydropower dam by China National Machinery Industry Corporation in 2014.

Part of the protected area forms part of the Southern Cardamom REDD+ Project (SCRP).

== Project Tiger ==
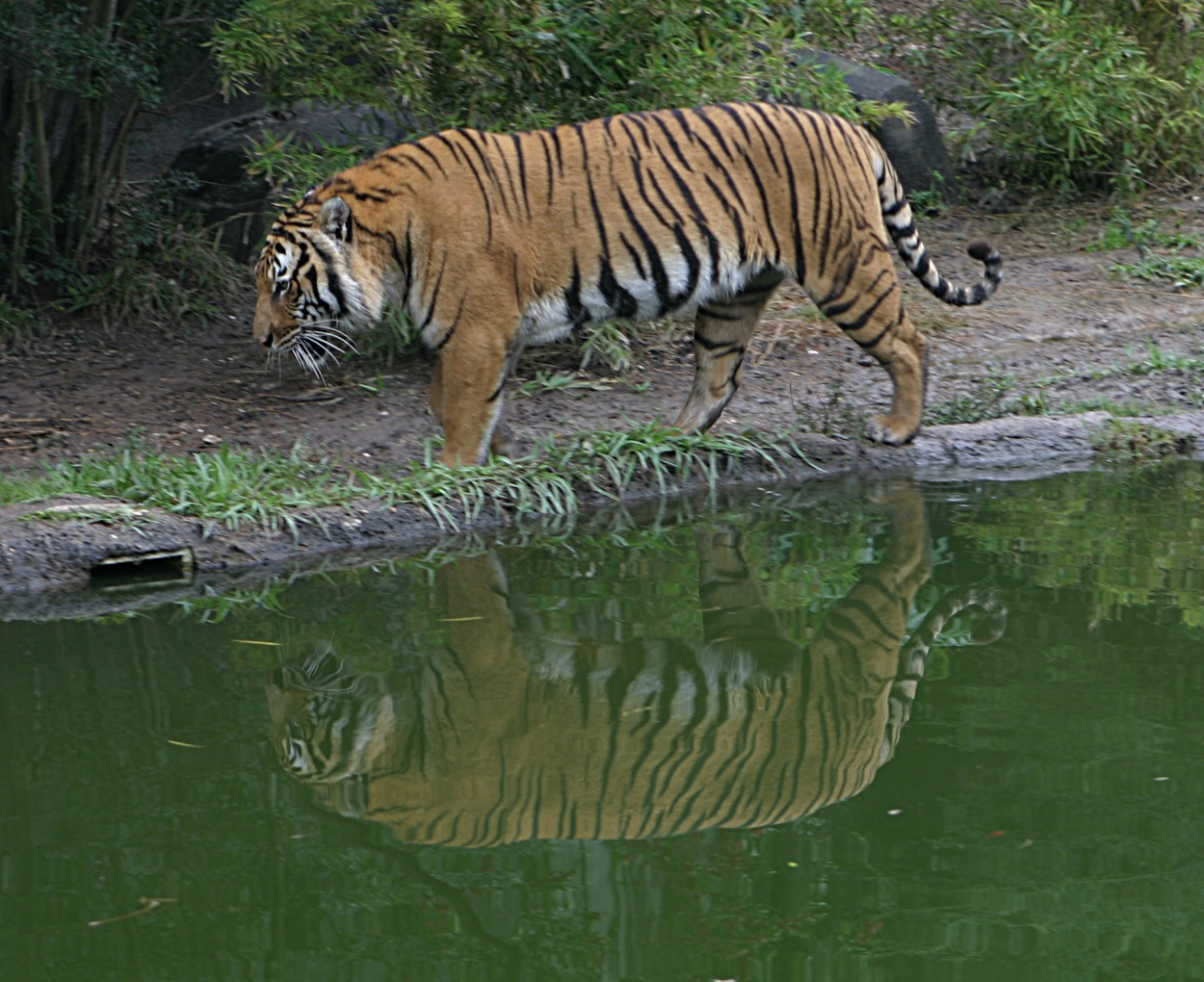
The tiger

In 2007, the Indochinese tiger was last spotted in the country on a camera trap. In 2016, the Cambodian government declared that the tiger was "functionally extinct". In April 2023, India signed a memorandum of understanding with Cambodia to assist the country with the tiger's reintroduction. At least 90 acres (36 hectares) of the cardamom rainforest could be used to host Bengal tigers that are imported from India.

== External ==
- Map of protected areas in Cambodia
