= Khao Mokochu =

Mountain in Thailand

Coordinates: 15°56′N 99°06′E

Khao Mokochu (Thai: เขาโมโกจู, pronounced [kʰǎw mōːkōːt͡ɕūː]) is a peak in Kamphaeng Phet Province. The word Mokochu is derived from the Karen language. (Karen are the tribe who occupy the highland area). It means '[it] seems like it is going to rain' as the peak is often covered by clouds and it is cold all the time, especially during the winter months. Mokochu peak is in Mae Wong National Park in Kamphaeng Phet, close to the Wildlife Umphang Sanctuary. It is the highest peak in the Western Forest at 1,964 meters elevation. Near Mokochu is the Mae Rewa Waterfall.
