= Thungyai–Huai Kha Khaeng Wildlife Sanctuaries =

UNESCO World Heritage Site
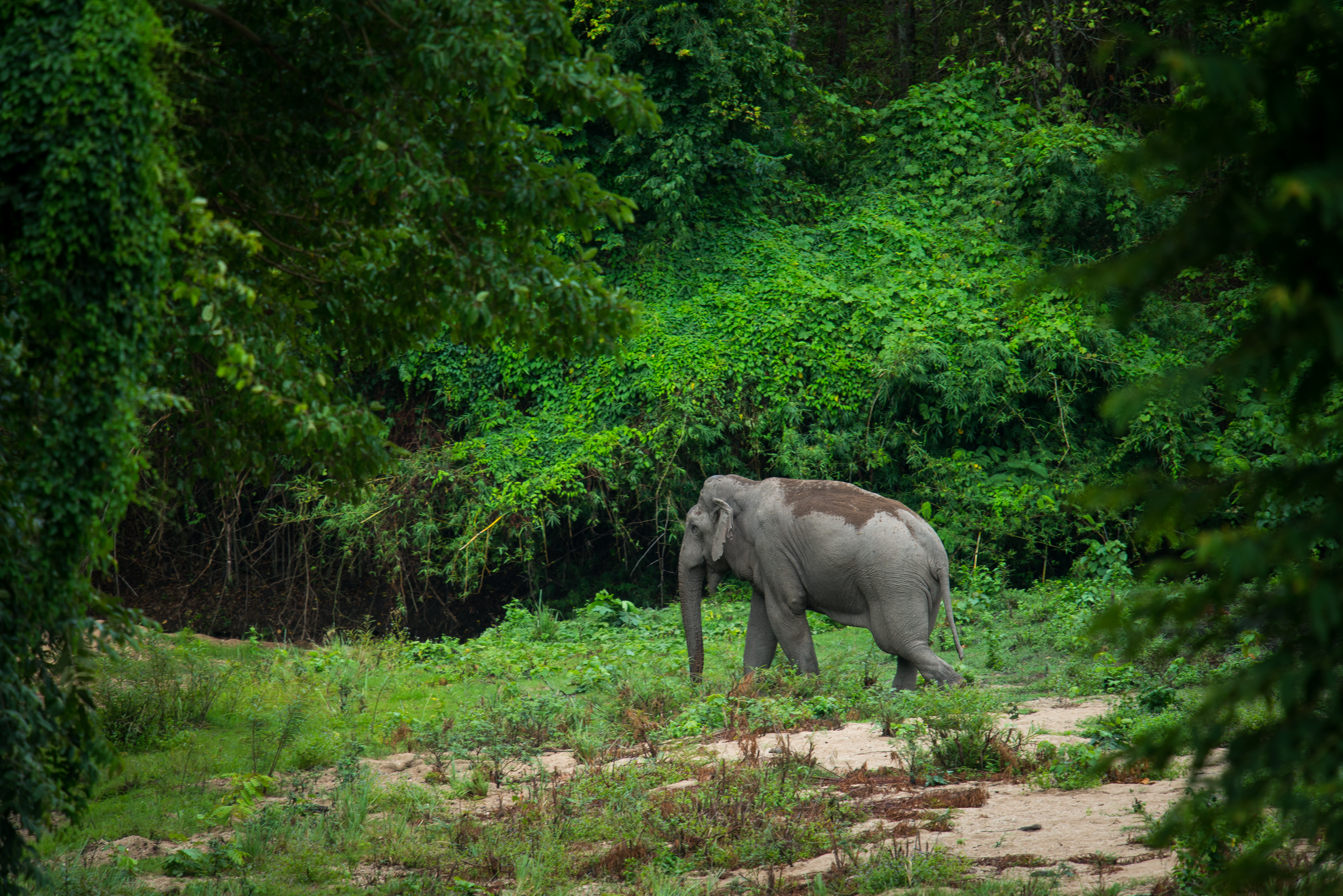
- Elephant at Huai Kha Khaeng

- Location within Thailand
- Location: Thailand
- Includes: Thung Yai Naresuan Wildlife Sanctuary; Huai Kha Khaeng Wildlife Sanctuary
- Criteria: Natural: (vii), (ix), (x)
- Reference: 591
- Inscription: 1991 (15th Session)
- Area: 622,200 ha (2,402 sq mi)
- Coordinates: 15°20′N 98°55′E

Thungyai–Huai Kha Khaeng Wildlife Sanctuaries is the inscribed name of a UNESCO World Heritage Site in Thailand covering the areas of two adjacent wildlife sanctuaries: Thung Yai Naresuan and Huai Kha Khaeng. They cover areas in Kanchanaburi, Tak and Uthai Thani provinces, and form a large part of Thailand's Western Forest Complex. The site was inscribed on the World Heritage list in 1991.

Stretching over more than 600,000 hectares (1,500,000 acres) along the Myanmar border, the sanctuaries, which are relatively intact, contain examples of almost all the forest types of continental Southeast Asia. They are home to a very diverse array of animals, including 77 percent of the large mammals (especially elephants and tigers), 50 percent of the large birds and 33 percent of the land vertebrates to be found in this region.
