= Central Thailand =

Region in Thailand

Central Region ภาคกลาง Dvaravati
- Region
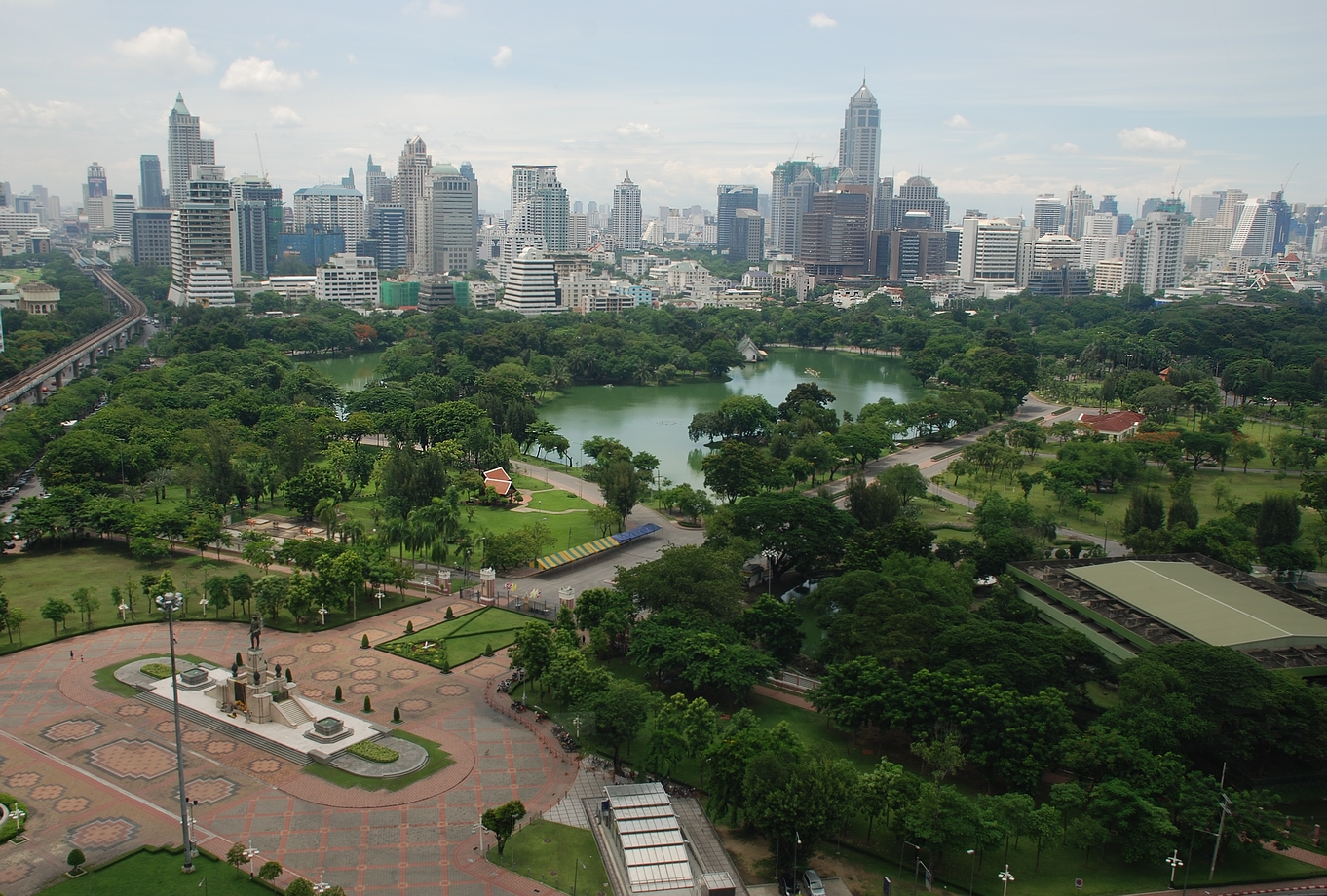
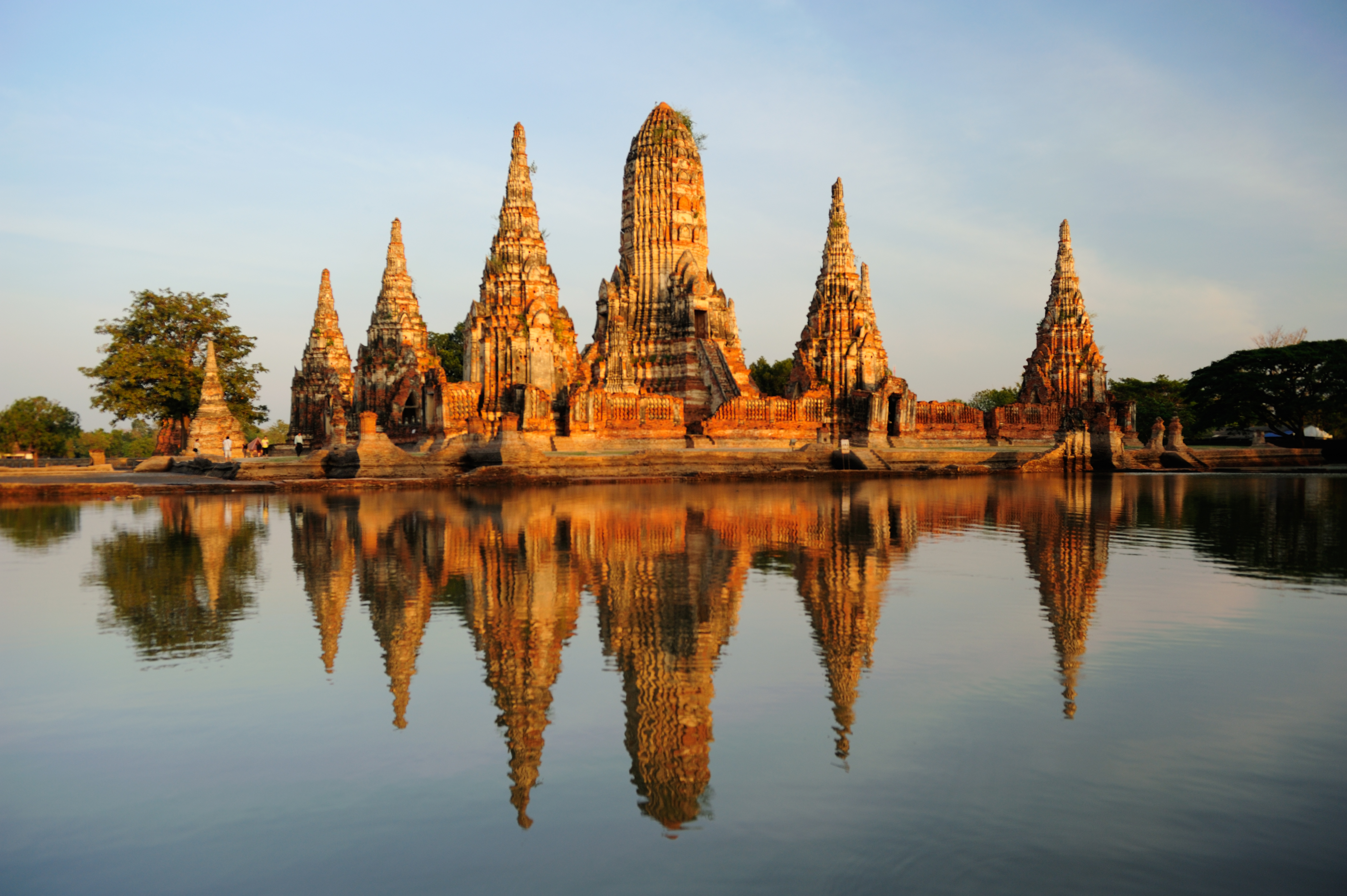
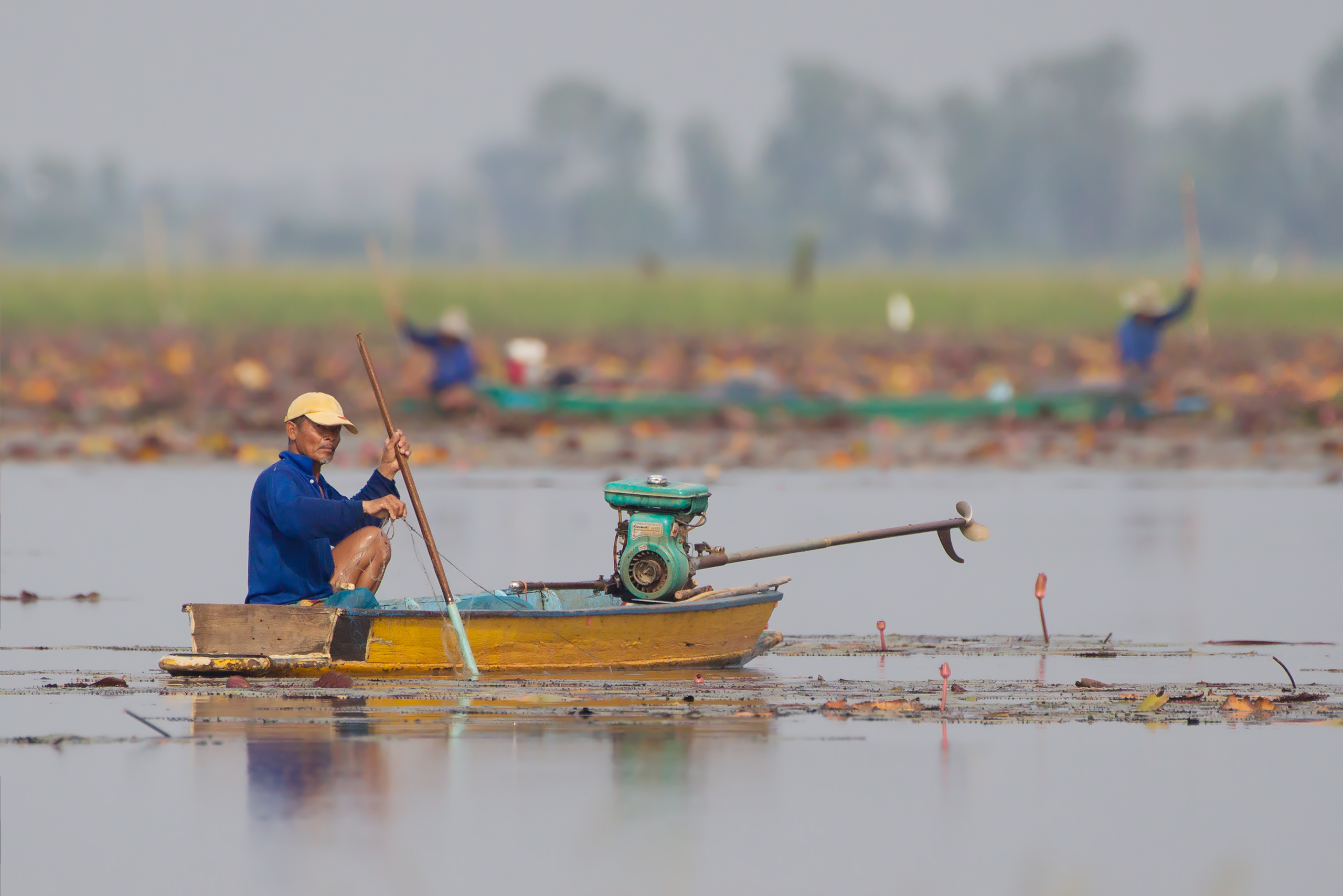
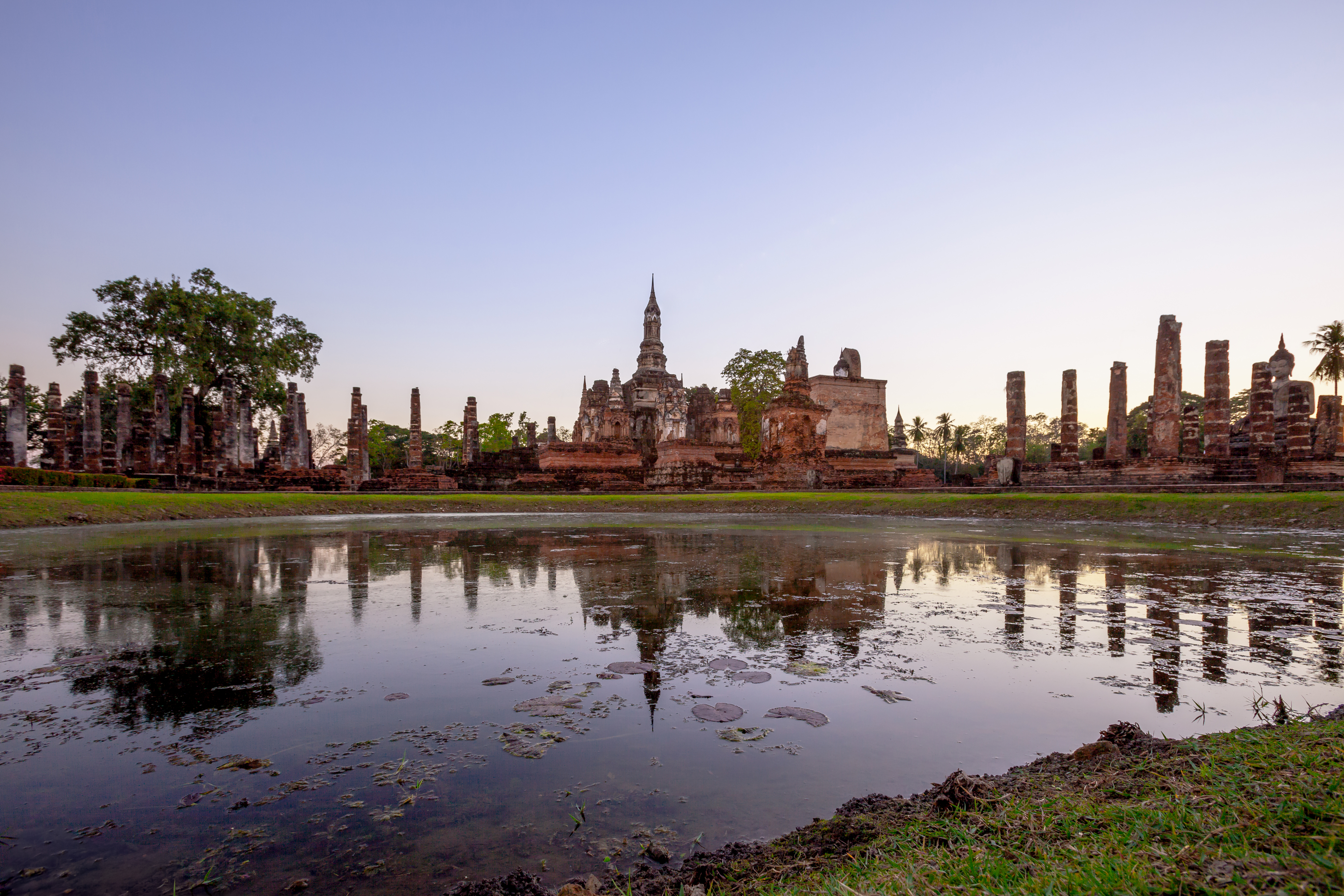
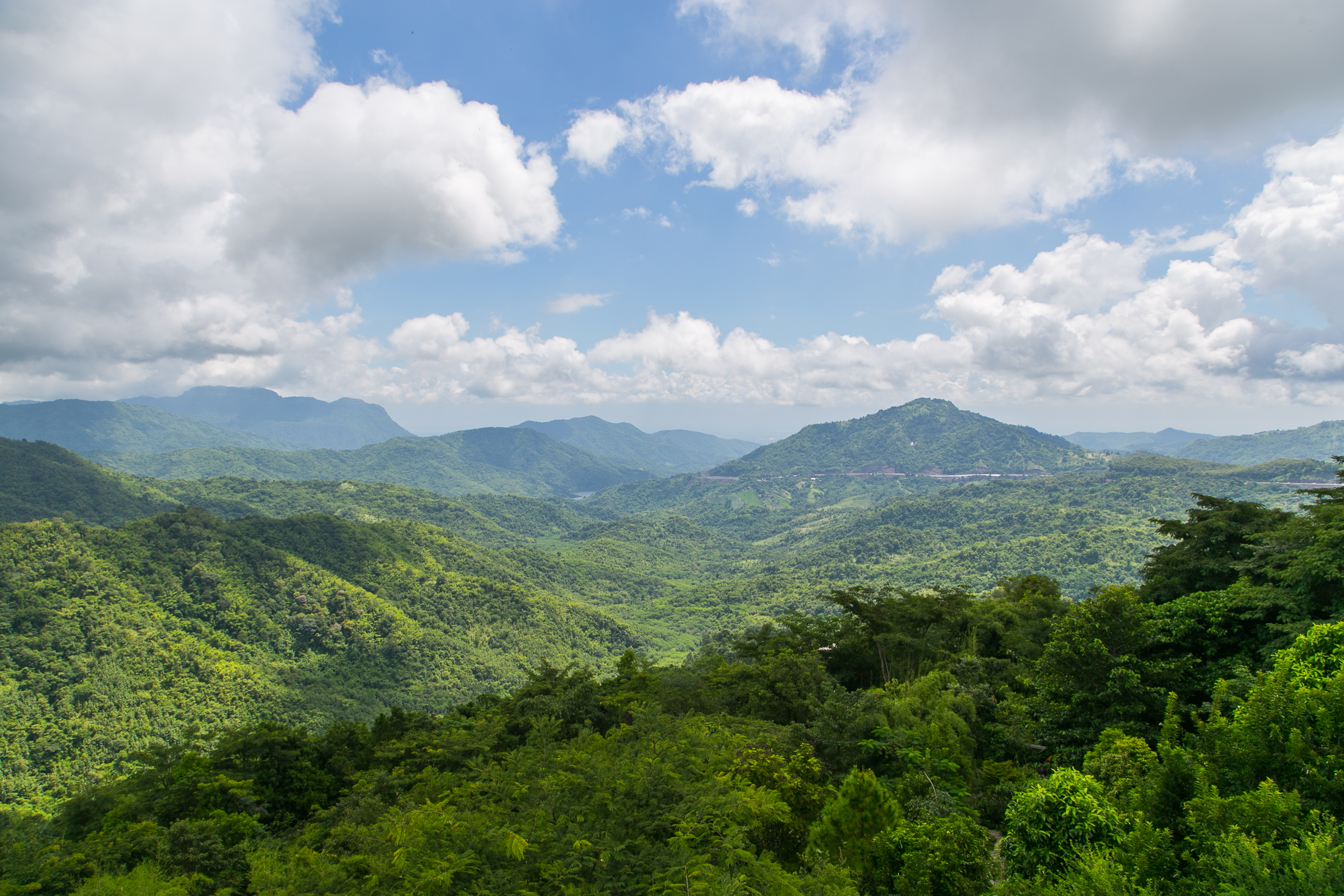
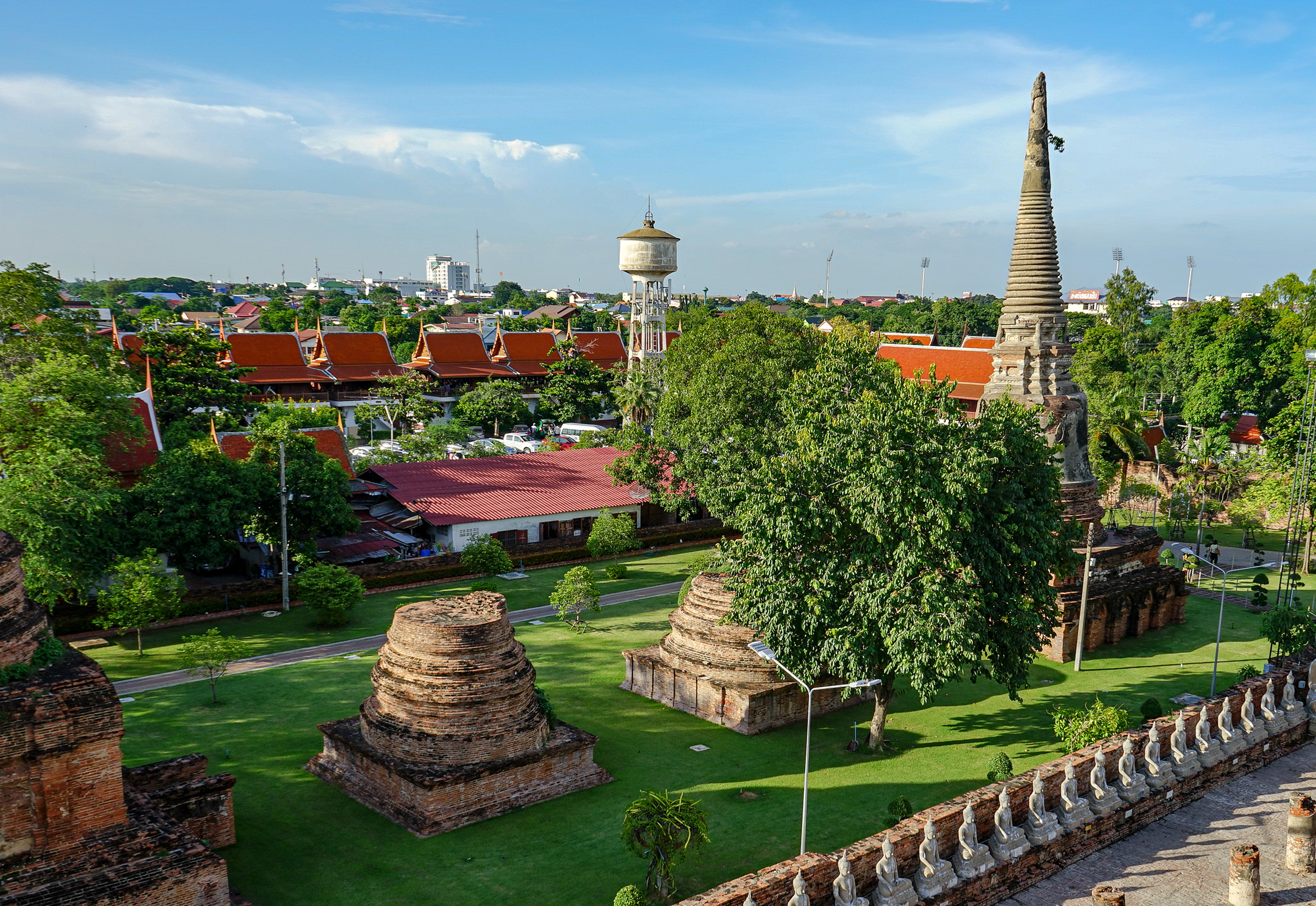
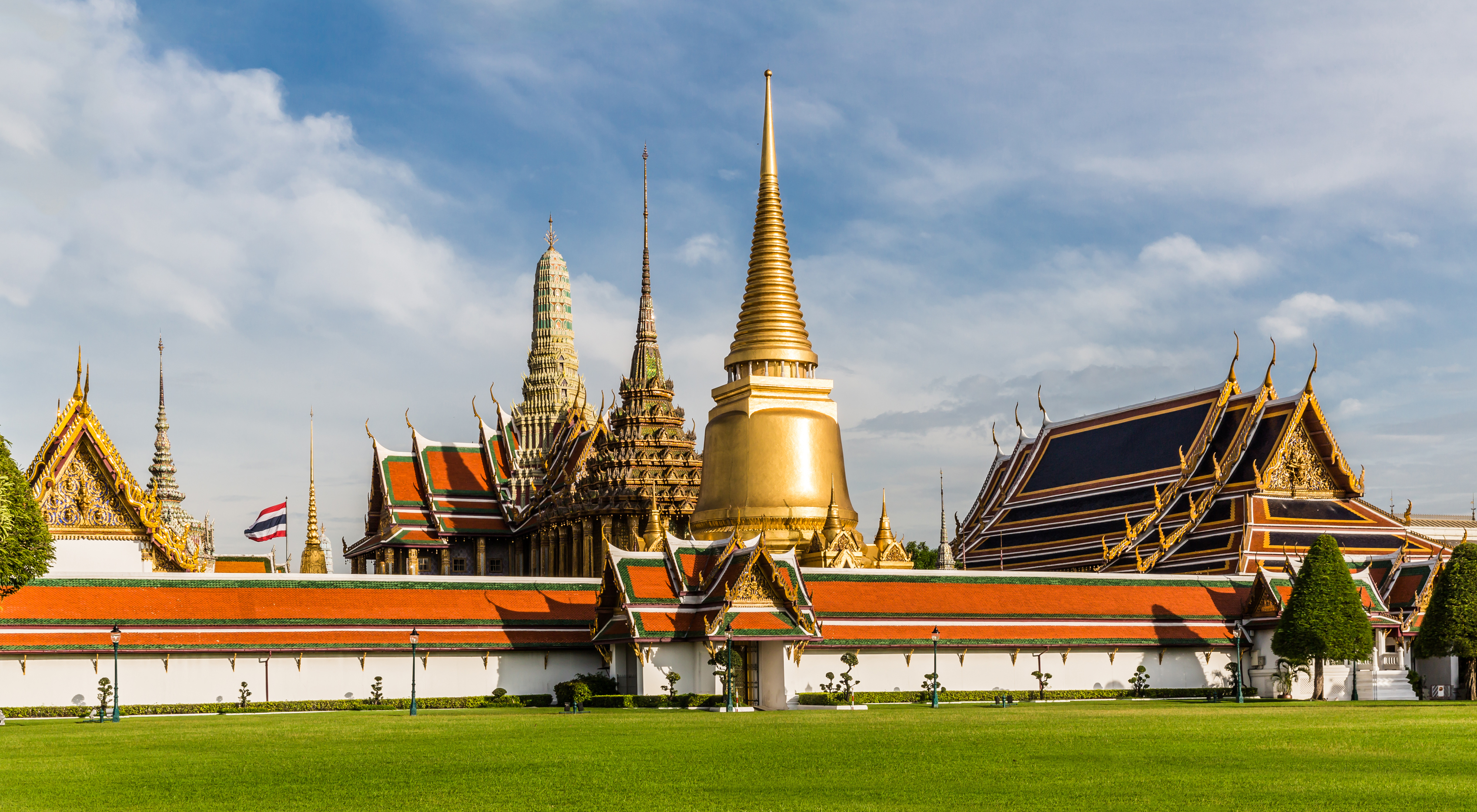
- Lumphini Park Wat Chaiwatthanaram Bueng Boraphet Wat Mahathat in Sukhothai Historical Park Khao Kho National Park Ayutthaya Historical Park Wat Phra Kaew

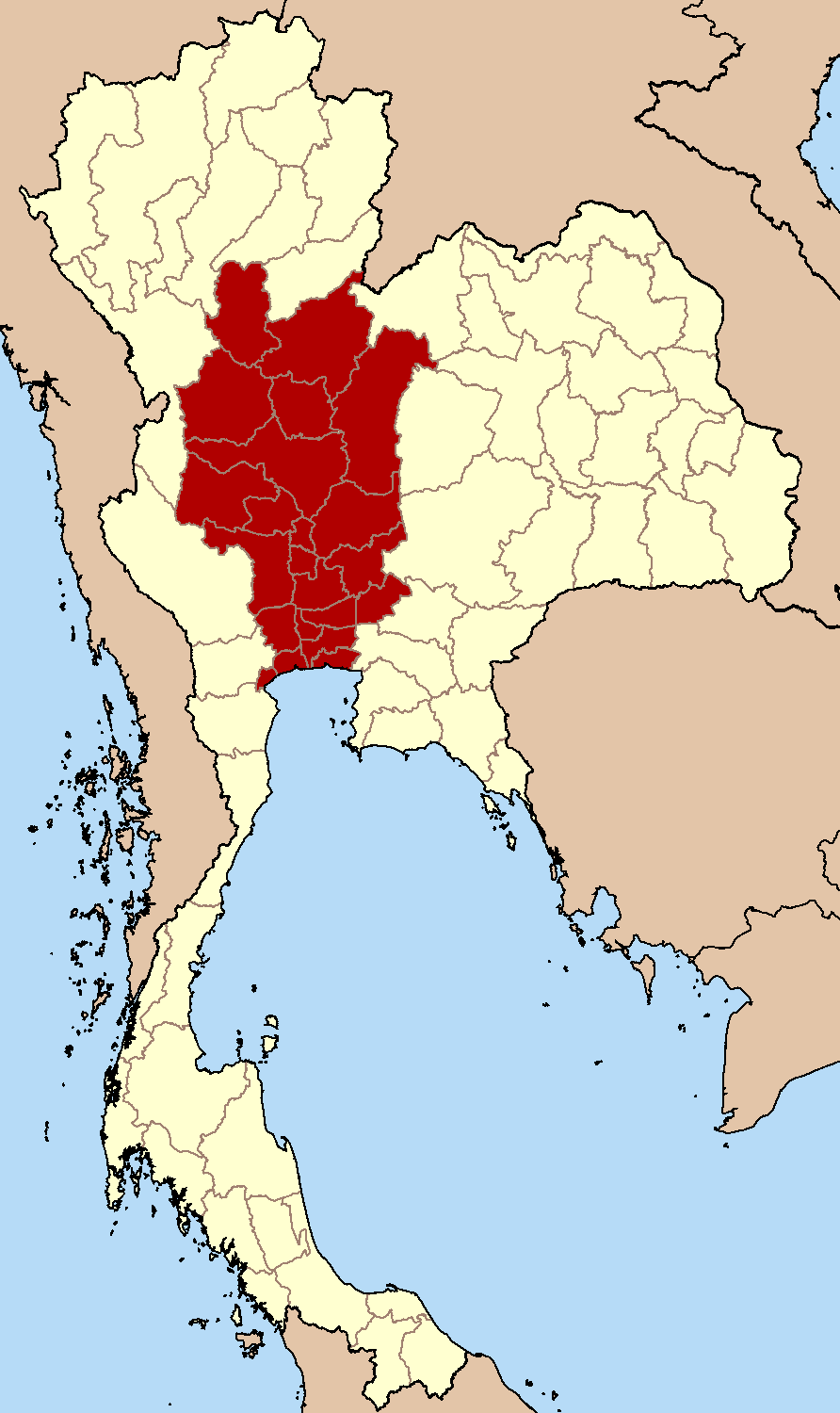
- Central Region in Thailand
- Coordinates: 15°N 100°E
- Country: Thailand
- Provinces: 21 Provinces; 1 Special administrative area: Bangkok; Nakhon Pathom province; Nonthaburi province; Pathum Thani province; Samut Prakan province; Samut Sakhon province; Samut Songkhram province; Kamphaeng Phet province; Nakhon Sawan province; Phetchabun province; Phichit province; Phitsanulok province; Sukhothai province; Uthai Thani province; Ang Thong province; Phra Nakhon Si Ayutthaya province; Chai Nat province; Lopburi province; Nakhon Nayok province; Saraburi province; Sing Buri province; Suphanburi province

Area
  - Total: 91,798.64 km^{2} (35,443.65 sq mi)

Population (2024)
  - Total: 20,844,000
  - Density: 227.06/km^{2} (588.09/sq mi)

GDP (Nominal, 2024)
  - Metro: ฿9.711 trillion (US$275.798 billion)
  - Per capita: ฿465,890 (US$13,231)
- Time zone: UTC+07:00 (ICT)
- Largest city: Bangkok
- Language: Thai • others

Central Thailand (also known as Siam, Siam proper or Dvaravati) is one of the regions of Thailand, covering the broad alluvial plain of the Chao Phraya River. Located in the central plains, it is separated from northeast Thailand (Isan) by the Phetchabun mountain range. The Tenasserim Hills separate it from Myanmar to the west. In the north it is bounded by the Phi Pan Nam Range, one of the hilly systems of northern Thailand. The area was the heartland of the Ayutthaya Kingdom (at times referred to as Siam) and is still the dominant area of Thailand since it contains the world's most primate city, Bangkok.

== Definition ==
The grouping of Thai provinces into regions follow two major systems in which Thailand is divided into either four or six regions. In the six-region system, commonly used in geographical studies, central Thailand extends from Sukhothai and Phitsanulok Provinces in the north to the provinces bordering the Gulf of Thailand in the south, excluding the mountainous provinces bordering Myanmar to the west and the coastal provinces of the east. The four-region system includes provinces only as far north as Chai Nat, Sing Buri and Lopburi and extends west and east to the borders of Myanmar and Cambodia.
The central region, as defined by Royal Forest Department in 2019, consists of 18 provinces (7 provinces of Greater Bangkok, 8 provinces of South Central Thailand and 3 provinces of Western Thailand). The total area of this central region is 67,473 km^{2} (26,051 sq mi), while the total forest area is 22,374 km^{2} (8,639 sq mi) or 33.2 percent of this regional area.

== Administrative divisions ==
There are several different systems of dividing modern Thailand into different regions, which gives slightly different boundaries for Central Thailand. In the geographic six-region system, the central region includes the following 22 provinces, divided into three groups:

- Greater Bangkok: Bangkok, Nakhon Pathom, Nonthaburi, Pathum Thani, Samut Prakan, Samut Sakhon, Samut Songkhram
- North Central Thailand region: Kamphaeng Phet, Nakhon Sawan, Phetchabun, Phichit, Phitsanulok, Sukhothai, Uthai Thani
- South Central Thailand region: Ang Thong, Ayutthaya, Chainat, Lopburi, Nakhon Nayok, Saraburi, Sing Buri; Suphanburi

The four-region system includes 26 provinces in its definition of Central Thailand. Especially for statistical purposes, they are divided into four groups:

- Greater Bangkok: Bangkok, Nakhon Pathom, Nonthaburi, Pathum Thani, Samut Prakan, Samut Sakhon
- Sub-Central Thailand region: Ang Thong, Ayutthaya, Chainat, Lopburi, Nakhon Nayok, Saraburi, Sing Buri
- Western Thailand region: Kanchanaburi, Phetchaburi, Prachuap Khiri Khan, Ratchaburi, Samut Songkhram, Suphanburi
- Eastern Thailand region: Chachoengsao, Chanthaburi, Chonburi, Prachinburi, Rayong, Sa Kaeo, Trat

The eastern region is sometimes listed as a separate region distinct from Central Thailand: sometimes only the four coastal provinces and sometimes the above list excluding Nakhon Nayok. None of those regions are political subdivisions; they are only geographical or statistical groupings.

== Economy ==
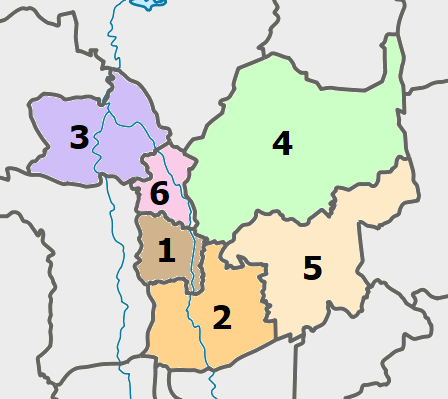

For economic statistics of Central Thailand by National Statistical Office (NSO) the following six provinces are listed: 1.Ang Thong 2.Ayutthaya 3.Chai Nat 4.Lopburi 5.Saraburi 6.Sing Buri
However Nakhon Nayok province is listed by eastern Thailand.
For FY 2018, Central Region had a combined economic output of 863.328 billion baht (US$27.85 billion), or 5.3 percent of Thailand's GDP. Ayutthaya province had an economic output of 412.701 billion baht (US$13.3 billion). This amounts to GPP per capita of 454,953 baht (US$14,676), 40 percent more than Saraburi province, next in the ranking and three times more than for all subsequent provinces in the ranking.

Gross Provincial Product (GPP)
Rank	Province	GPP (million baht)	Population (x 1000)	GPP per capita (baht)
1	Ayutthaya	412,701	907	454,953
2	Saraburi	246,063	758	324,820
3	Sing Buri	27,783	190	145,899
4	Lopburi	110,962	777	142,741
5	Ang Thong	30,539	250	122,159
6	Chai Nat	35,280	294	119,850
	Central region	863,328	3,177	271,759

View source data.
