= Huai Kha Khaeng Wildlife Sanctuary =

Protected area in Thailand

- เขตรักษาพันธุ์สัตว์ป่าห้วยขาแข้ง
- IUCN category Ia (strict nature reserve)
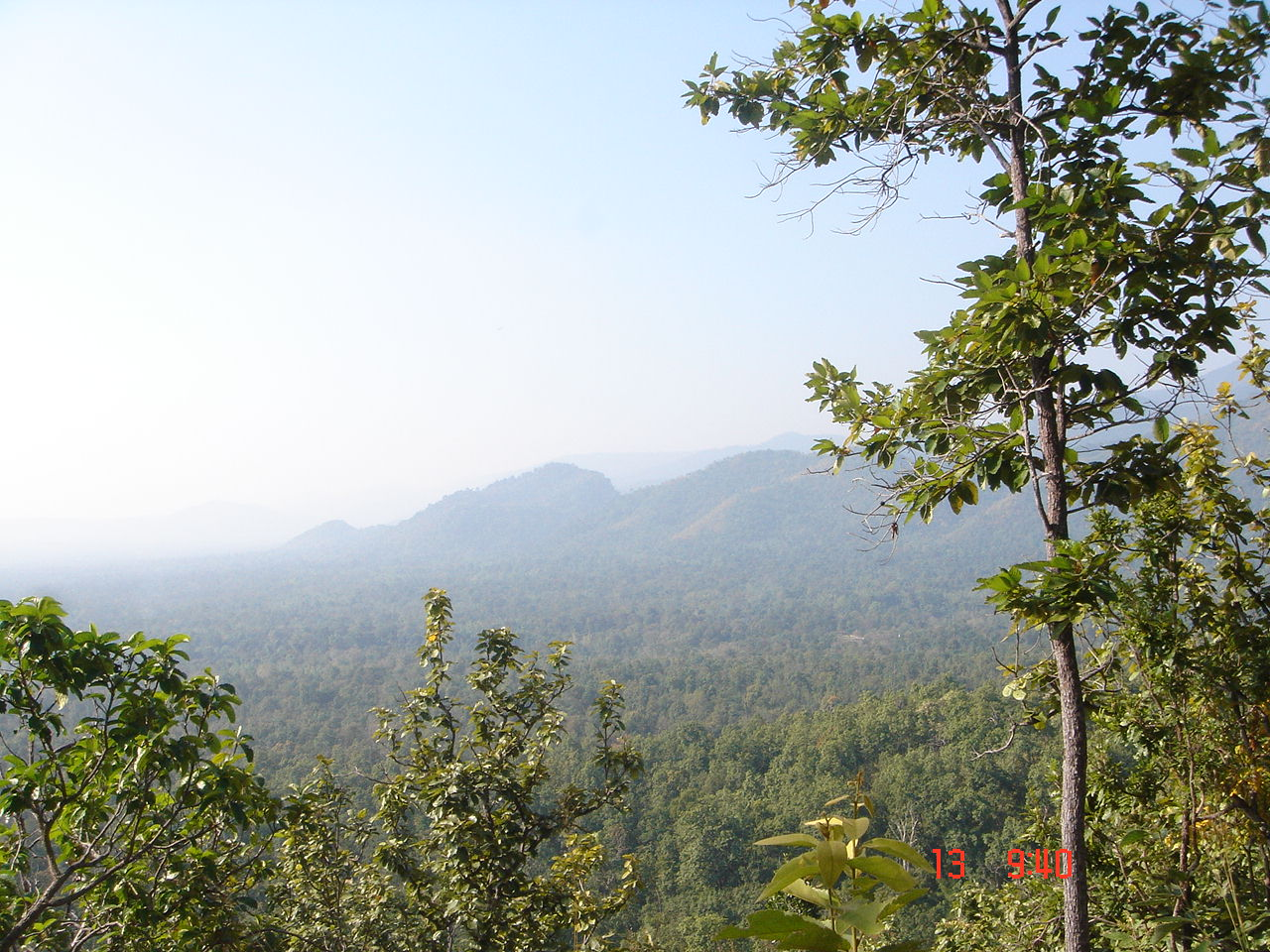

- Location within Thailand
- Location: Kanchanaburi, Tak and Uthai Thani Provinces, Thailand
- Nearest city: Tak
- Coordinates: 15°25′05″N 99°13′57″E
- Area: 2822.08 km² (after 1992)
- Established: 1972
- Governing body: Wildlife Conservation Office

UNESCO World Heritage Site
- Official name: Thungyai-Huai Kha Khaeng Wildlife Sanctuaries
- Type: Natural
- Criteria: vii, ix, x
- Designated: 1991 (15th session)
- Reference no.: 591
- Region: Asia-Pacific

The Huai Kha Khaeng Wildlife Sanctuary (Thai: เขตรักษาพันธุ์สัตว์ป่าห้วยขาแข้ง, pronounced [kʰèːt rák.sǎː pʰān sàt pàː hûaj kʰǎː kʰɛ̂ŋ]) is in Uthai Thani and Tak Provinces, Thailand. The park was established in 1972, and is part of the largest intact seasonal tropical forest complex in Mainland Southeast Asia. It, coupled with the Thungyai Naresuan Wildlife Sanctuary was declared a World Heritage Site by the United Nations in 1991. Together, the two sanctuaries occupy 622,200 hectares. As of 2014 it still contained viable populations of large mammals, including gibbons, bears, elephants and Indochinese tigers, although like all other sites in mainland Southeast Asia, some species (e.g., rhinoceroses) have disappeared or have experienced severe declines.

== History ==
After the establishment of the wildlife sanctuary on 4 September 1972, it covered an area of 1,019,375 rai ~ 1,631 km^{2} (630 sq mi). The wildlife sanctuary was then expanded twice, first on 21 May 1986 to 1,609,150 rai ~ 2,574 km^{2} (994 sq mi), an increase of 589,775 rai ~ 943 km^{2} (364 sq mi) and on 30 December 1992 to 1,737,587 rai ~ 2,780 km^{2} (1,070 sq mi) an increase of 718,212 rai ~ 1,149 km^{2} (444 sq mi). Until 1976 there were Karen villages within the wildlife sanctuary. Today the wildlife sanctuary no longer has any known human population living in the area. Some Karen villages were moved in 1976 from the southernmost area to Ban Rai District to the southeast. A Hmong village in the west was moved after 1986.

== Wildlife ==
A large number of the animal and plant life diversity can be found nowhere else, with species such as the Sino-Himalayan, Indo-Burmese, Sundaic, and Indo-Chinese affinities, living in the wildlife sanctuary. Species present at the wildlife sanctuary are usually rare, endangered, or local. Roughly one-third of Southeast Asia's mammals are said to be thriving within the wildlife sanctuary. The wildlife sanctuary is responsible for three of the National Reserved Wildlife Species of Thailand: wild water buffalo (Bubalus arnee), mainland serow (Capricornis sumatraensis), and Indian hog deer (Hyelaphus porcinus). Many species of birds, reptiles, and amphibians have also been reported. Sighting of 355 bird species have been recorded in the wildlife sanctuary, a lot of these species are now rare in Thailand and some are considered endangered. There are currently 90 wild Indochinese tigers within the sanctuary.

== Visitor and scientific research facilities ==
The wildlife sanctuary receives most visitors during the summer or the "dry season". Some sections of the sanctuary are not open to the public without permission. The Conservation Office in Bangkok and the chief of Huai Kha Khaeng are responsible for granting permission to those who wish to visit prohibited areas.

== Location ==
Huai Kha Khaeng Wildlife Sanctuary in overview PARO 12 (Nakhon Sawan)

4) Huai Kha Khaeng Wildlife Sanctuary in overview PARO 12

	National park
1	Khlong Lan
2	Khlong Wang Chao
3	Mae Wong
	Wildlife sanctuary
4	Huai Kha Khaeng
5	Khao Sanam Phriang

	Non-hunting area
6	Bueng Boraphet
7	Tham Phratun
	Forest park
8	Huai Khot
9	Khao Luang
10	Nakhon Chai Bowon
11	Tham Khao Wong
12	Tham Phet–Tham Thong

	Arboretum
13	Kanchana Kuman
14	Paisali

== See also ==
- DNP - Huai Kha Khaeng Wildlife Sanctuary
