= Kamphaeng Phet province =

Kamphaeng Phet กำแพงเพชร
- Province
- Kamphaeng Phet Province จังหวัดกำแพงเพชร
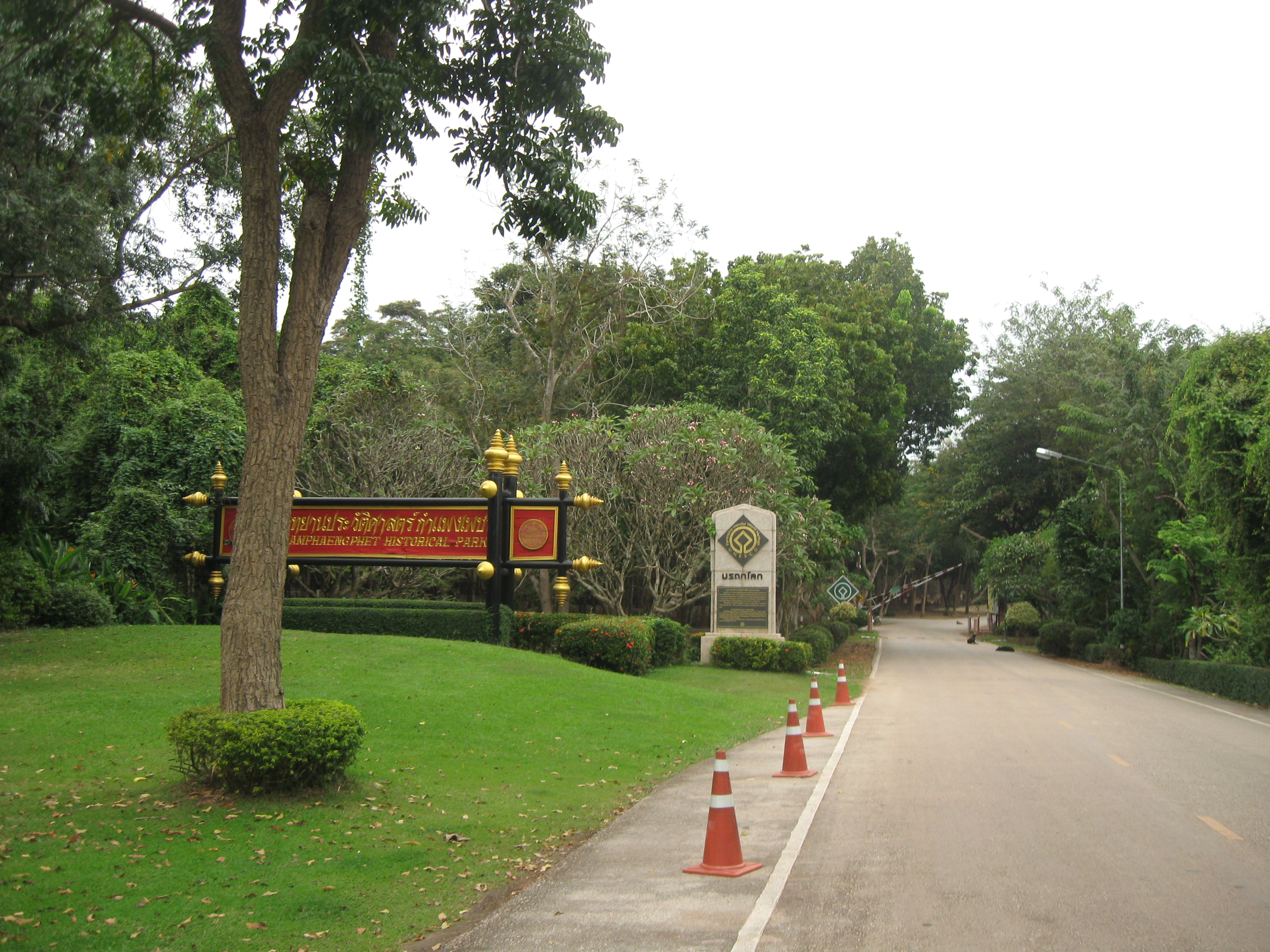
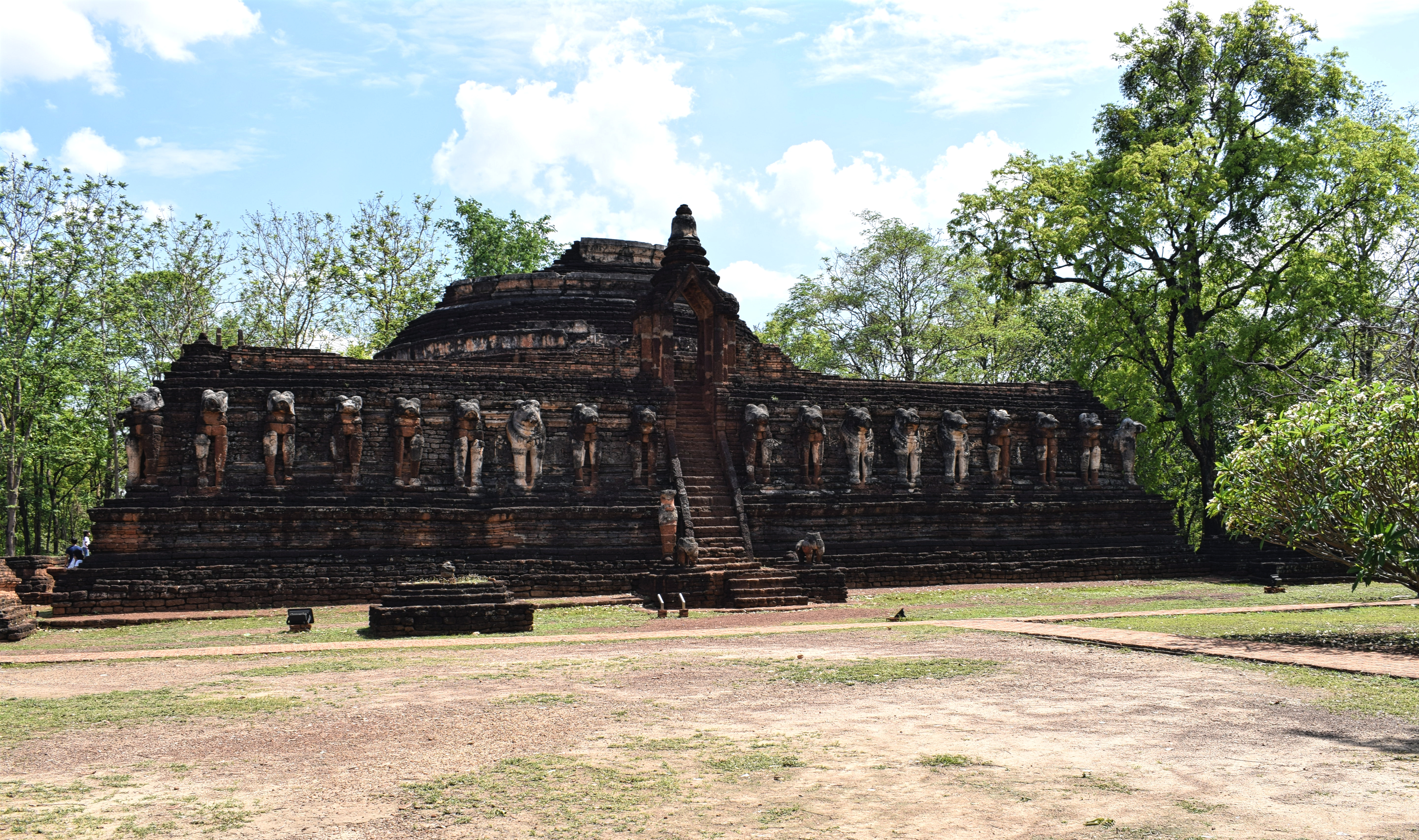
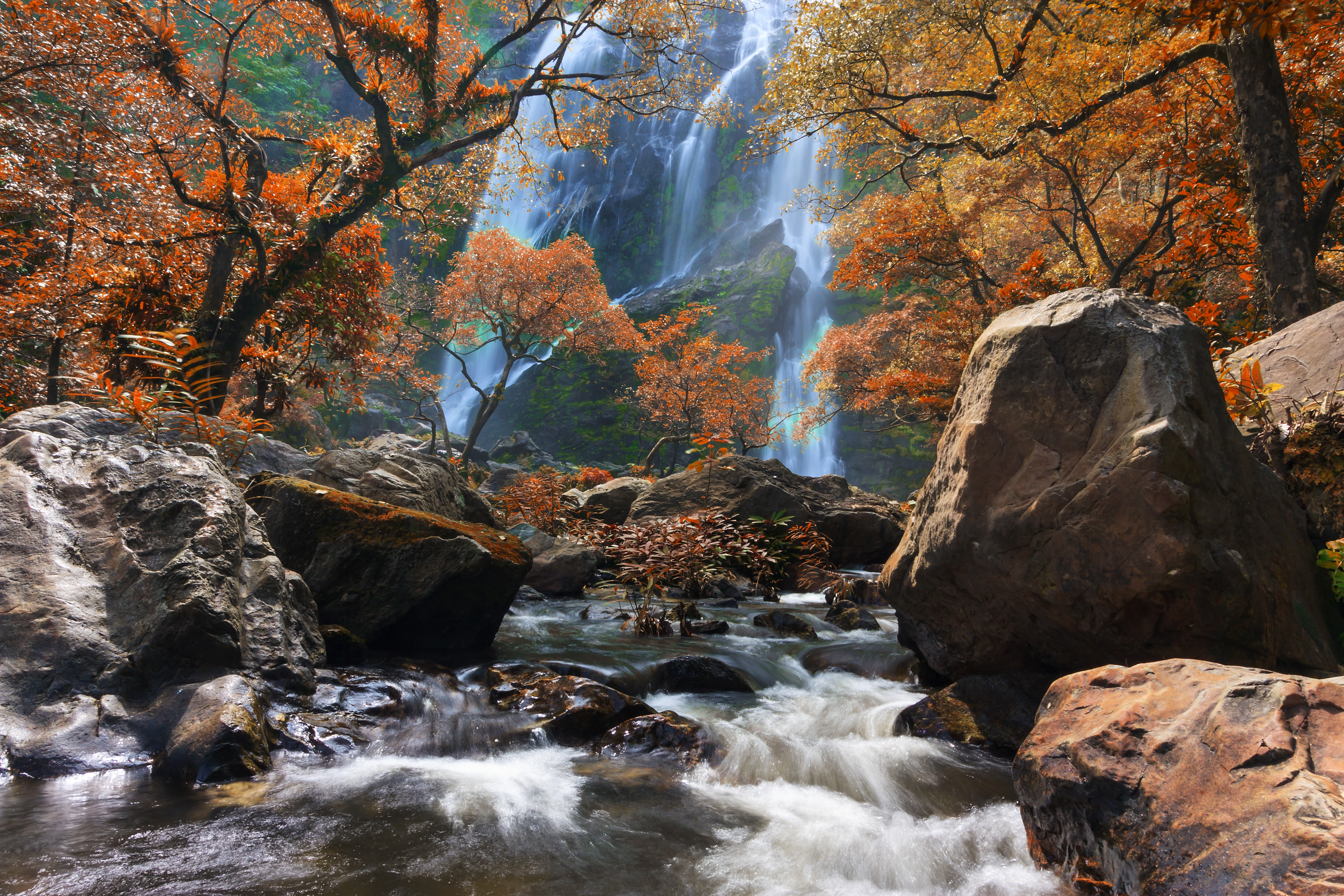
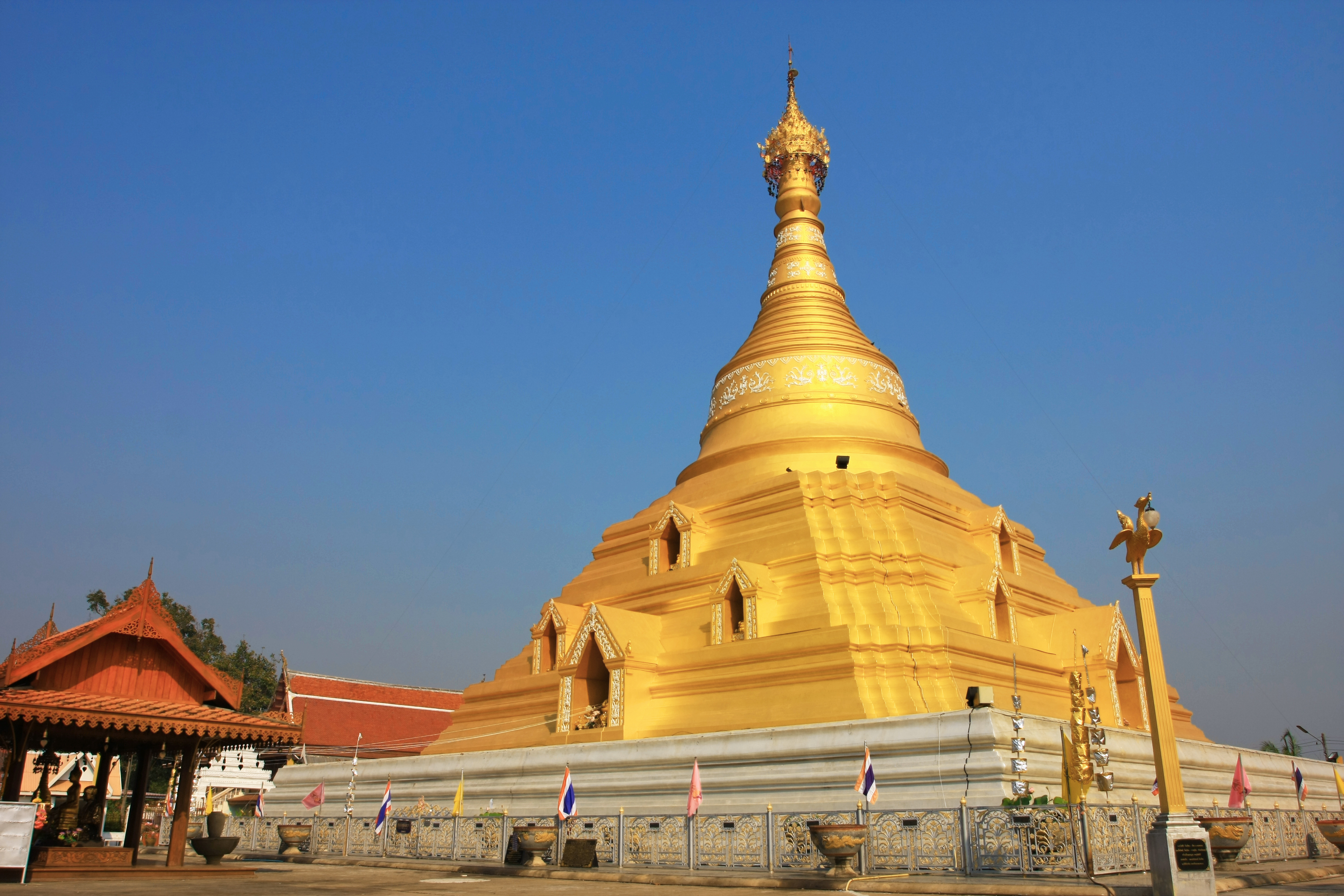
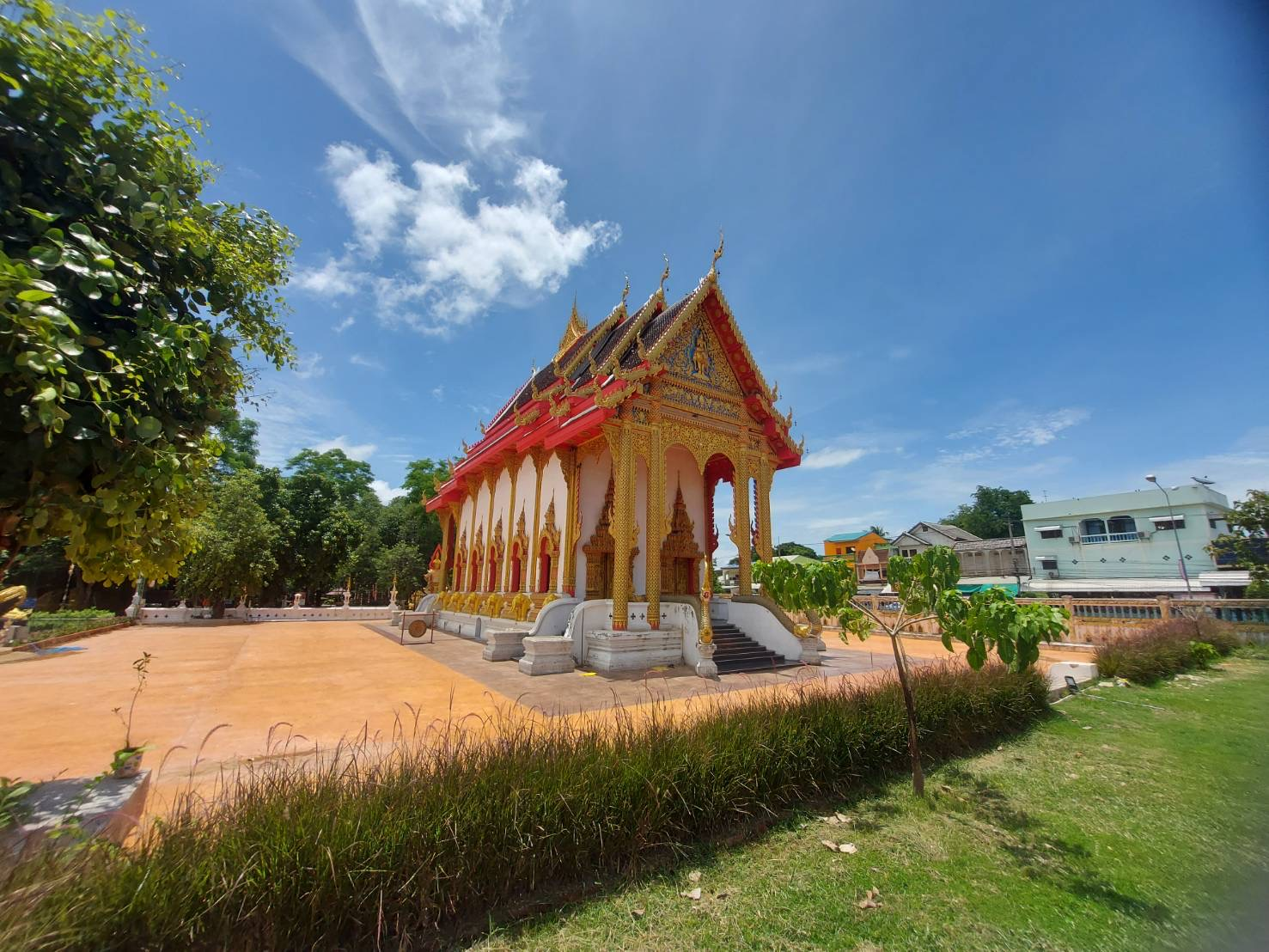
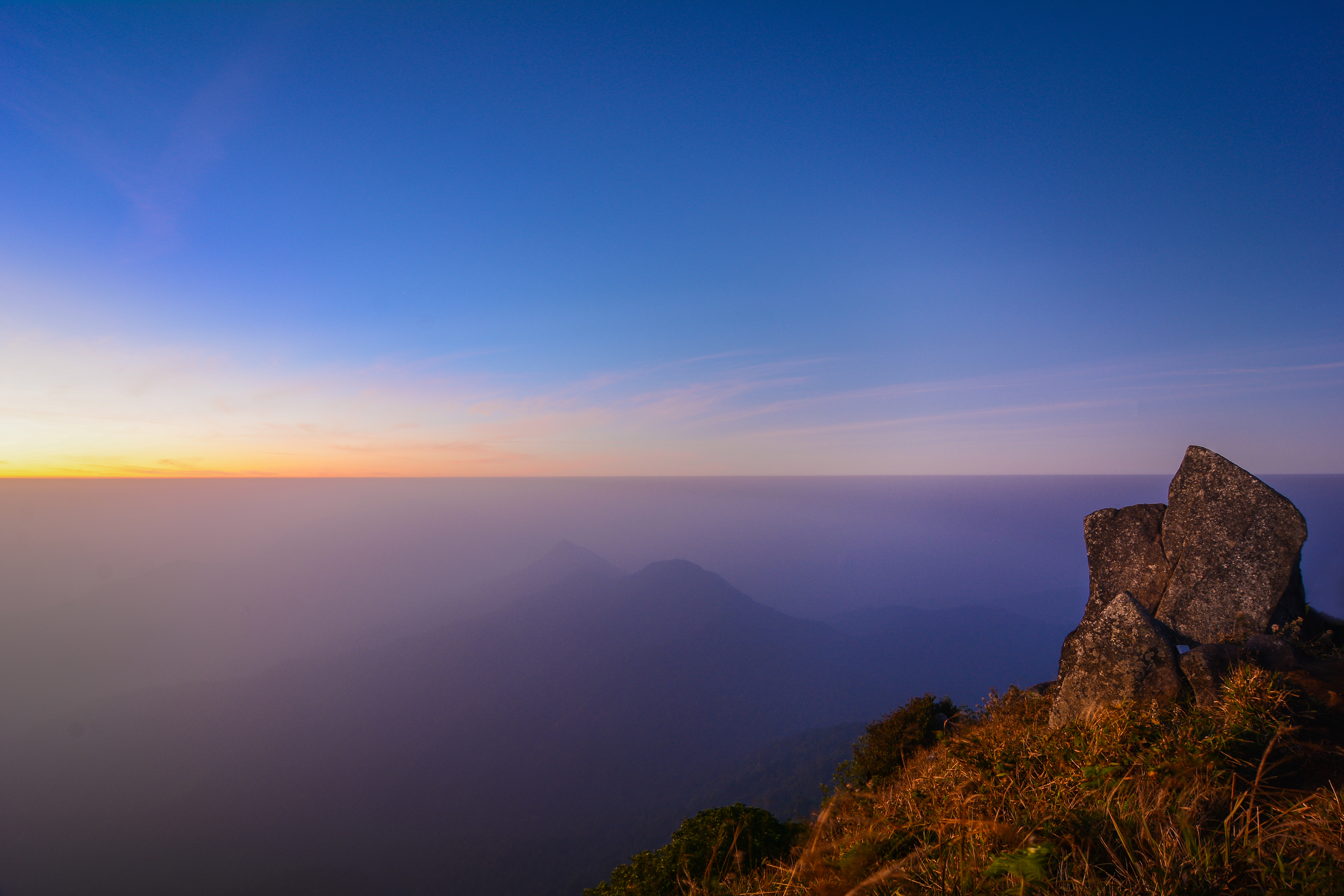
- From left to right, top to bottom: Kamphaeng Phet Historical Park, Wat Chang Rob, Khlong Lan Waterfall, Wat Phra Bommathat, Wat Thung Sanun Rattanaram, Mae Wong National Park

- Flag Seal
- Nicknames: Chakungrao (Thai: ชากังราว); Mueang Kluai Khai (city of lady finger bananas)
- Motto: กรุพระเครื่อง เมืองคนแกร่ง พระแสงฯ ล้ำค่า ศิลาแลงใหญ่ กล้วยไข่หวาน น้ำมันลานกระบือ เลื่องลือมรดกโลก ("Buddha amulets repository. City of the strong. Precious Phra Saeng swords. Large laterite slabs, Sweet lady finger bananas. Lan Krabue oil. Renowned world heritage.")
- Location of Kamphaeng Phet in Thailand
- Country: Thailand
- Established: 1916
- Capital: Kamphaeng Phet
- Subdivisions: 11 districts

Government
  - Type: Province and Provincial Administrative Organization
  - Body: Kamphaeng Phet Province and Kamphaeng Phet Provincial Administrative Organization
  - Governor: Chathip Ruchanaseri
  - PAO Chief Executive: Sunthorn Rattanakorn

Area
  - Total: 8,512 km^{2} (3,287 sq mi)
  - Rank: 23rd

Population (2024)
  - Total: ▼700,862
  - Rank: 38th
  - Density: 82/km^{2} (210/sq mi)
  - Rank: 58th

Human Achievement Index
  - HAI (2022): 0.6283 "somewhat low" Ranked 58th

GDP
  - Total: baht 110 billion (US$3.8 billion) (2019)
- Time zone: UTC+07:00 (ICT)
- ISO 3166 code: TH-62
- Website: kamphaengphet.go.th kpppao.go.th

Kamphaeng Phet (Thai: กำแพงเพชร, pronounced [kām.pʰɛ̄ːŋ pʰét]) is a province in upper central Thailand. Kamphaeng Phet is known for its natural environment and has a long history. National and historical parks in the province include Kamphaeng Phet Historical Park, Khlong Lan National Park, and Mae Wong National Park.

The town was a royal city of the Sukhothai Kingdom under the name Chakangrao and part of its defences, and later of Ayutthaya's. An inscription of 1510 from the town records an order against selling cattle to the Lawa. The walls and monuments of the old town form part of a World Heritage Site with Sukhothai and Si Satchanalai.

== History ==
Kamphaeng Phet was already a royal city in the Sukhothai Kingdom in the 14th century, then known under its old name Chakangrao. It formed an important part of the defence system of the kingdom, as well as of the later Ayutthaya Kingdom. An inscription of 1510 cut around the base of a bronze Īśvara from the town records the governor forbidding his subjects to sell cattle to the Lawa. Chusak Satienpattanodom counts it among the eight modern provinces that made up the real extent of Sukhothai, against the far wider reach claimed in the Ram Khamhaeng Inscription. When Sukhothai was divided in the early 15th century the town went to Phaya Saen Soi Dao. It refused a returning forest-order party the right to ordain in 1430, and was attacked in 1461 by Phaya Chaliang at the head of a Lan Na army. Kilns near the town copied the Sangkhalok wares of Si Satchanalai, and the wares themselves reach west only as far as Traitrueng on the Ping.

Piset Jiachanpong reads the town as an Ayutthayan foundation on the east bank of the Ping, placed opposite the Sukhothai city of Nakhon Chum. On his account it stood on high ground, clear of the flooding that troubled Nakhon Chum, and could be supplied by river from the lower Chao Phraya basin, so that Nakhon Chum's people may have crossed to settle there. Borommarachathirat I of Ayutthaya attacked Chakangrao four times between 1376 and 1388. The Palace Law made Kamphaeng Phet one of three northern principalities, with Phitsanulok and Sawankhalok. Tomé Pires, writing early in the 16th century, described its governor as a viceroy who within his own territory stood like the king of the land. Chairacha had the governor, Phraya Narai, executed there in 1538. Bayinnaung took the town in 1563 before moving against Phitsanulok.

== Toponymy ==
In Thai or Lao kamphaeng means 'wall' and phet (from Sanskrit vájra) means 'diamond'. The name means 'wall as hard as diamond'. This wall served as a defensive line to protect the Ayutthaya Kingdom from what is now modern-day Burma. The old name was Khao Kampeng, referring to a 'mountain wall' between the two countries.

== Symbols ==
The provincial seal shows the city walls surmounted by diamonds, since the city name means 'diamond wall' (from the shape of the ramparts of the old city wall). The provincial tree is the areca nut palm (Acacia catechu), and the provincial flower the bullet wood (Mimusops elengi). Golden belly barb (Hypsibarbus wetmorei) is provincial fish, since it is a fish found in the Ping river especially in the area of Kamphaeng Phet.

== Geography ==
It borders the provinces of Sukhothai to the north; Phitsanulok to the northeast; Phichit to the east; Nakhon Sawan to the south; and Tak to the west and northwest, covering over 8,512 square kilometres (3,287 sq mi) and is the fourth-largest provinces in central Thailand.
Kamphaeng Phet has the Ping River, a major tributary of the Chao Phraya River flow through is main river of the province, making river flats make up much of the east of the province, while the west is mountainous which is part of Dawna Range and it covered with plentifully forest. The total forest area is 1,997 km^{2} (771 sq mi) or 23.5 percent of provincial area.

One of the provinces best-known products is bananas, especially the kluai khai, a small, round, sweet banana. Banana festivals are held every year to thank the spirits for the harvest.

=== National parks ===
There area three national parks in region 12 (Nakhon Sawan), they are the protected areas in Kamphaeng Phet province. (Visitors in fiscal year 2024)

Mae Wong National Park	894 km^{2} (345 sq mi)	(73,914)
Khlong Wang Chao National Park	747 km^{2} (288 sq mi)	(53,232)
Khlong Lan National Park	300 km^{2} (120 sq mi)	(393,259)

=== Wildlife sanctuary ===
Khao Sanam Phriang Wildlife Sanctuary in region 12 (Nakhon Sawan) is in Kamphaeng Phet province.

Khao Sanam Phriang Wildlife Sanctuary 101 km^{2} (39 sq mi)

=== Location protected areas ===
Overview protected areas of Kamphaeng Phet

Kamphaeng Phet protected areas

	National park
1	Khlong Lan
2	Khlong Wang Chao
3	Mae Wong

	Wildlife sanctuary
4	Khao Sanam Phriang

== Administrative divisions ==
Map of 11 districts

=== Provincial government ===
The province is divided into 11 districts (amphoes). These are further divided into 78 subdistricts (tambons) and 823 villages (mubans).

1. Mueang Kamphaeng Phet
2. Sai Ngam
3. Khlong Lan
4. Khanu Woralaksaburi
5. Khlong Khlung
6. Phran Kratai
7. Lan Krabue
8. Sai Thong Watthana
9. Pang Sila Thong
10. Bueng Samakkhi
11. Kosamphi Nakhon

=== Local government ===
As of 26 November 2019 there are: one Kamphaeng Phet Provincial Administration Organisation (ongkan borihan suan changwat) and 25 municipal (thesaban) areas in the province. Kamphaeng Phet, Pang Makha and Nong Pling have town (thesaban mueang) status. Further 22 subdistrict municipalities (thesaban tambon). The non-municipal areas are administered by 64 Subdistrict Administrative Organisations — SAO (ongkan borihan suan tambon).

== Human achievement index 2022 ==
Health	Education	Employment	Income
39	70	71	13
Housing	Family	Transport	Participation
30	25	73	35
Province Kamphaeng Phet, with an HAI 2022 value of 0.6283 is "somewhat low", occupies place 58 in the ranking.

Since 2003, United Nations Development Programme (UNDP) in Thailand has tracked progress on human development at sub-national level using the Human achievement index (HAI), a composite index covering all the eight key areas of human development. National Economic and Social Development Board (NESDB) has taken over this task since 2017.

Rank	Classification
1–13	"High"
14–29	"Somewhat high"
30–45	"Average"
46–61	"Somewhat low"
62–77	"Low"

Map with provinces and HAI 2022 rankings

== Notable residents ==
- Tossapol Himmapan: singer
- Saman Sorjaturong: WBC & IBF light flyweight world champion
- Kaeo Pongprayoon: 2012 Summer Olympics silver medalist
- Chatchai Budprom: footballer
- Wattana Playnum: footballer
- Supattra Pairoj: volleyball player
- Somporn Yos: footballer

== Popular culture ==
Kamphaeng Phet was mentioned in crime fiction Sarawat Yai as the backdrop of the whole story. It was adapted into a television drama of the same name twice on Channel 7, in 1994 and 2019. In the versions of both television dramas, Kamphaeng Phet was changed to be called Phra Kamphaeng (พระกำแพง, pronounced [pʰráʔ kām.pʰɛ̄ːŋ]).

== Gallery ==
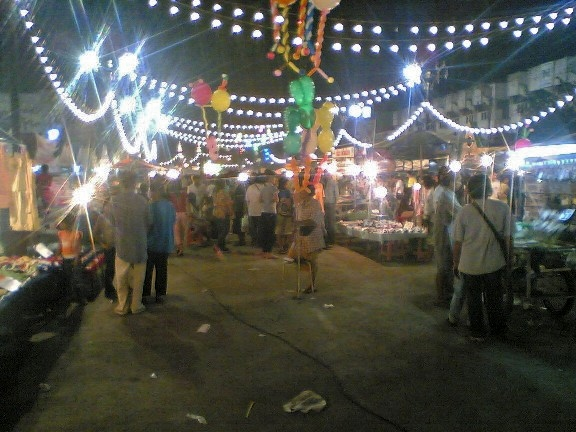
Banana Festival

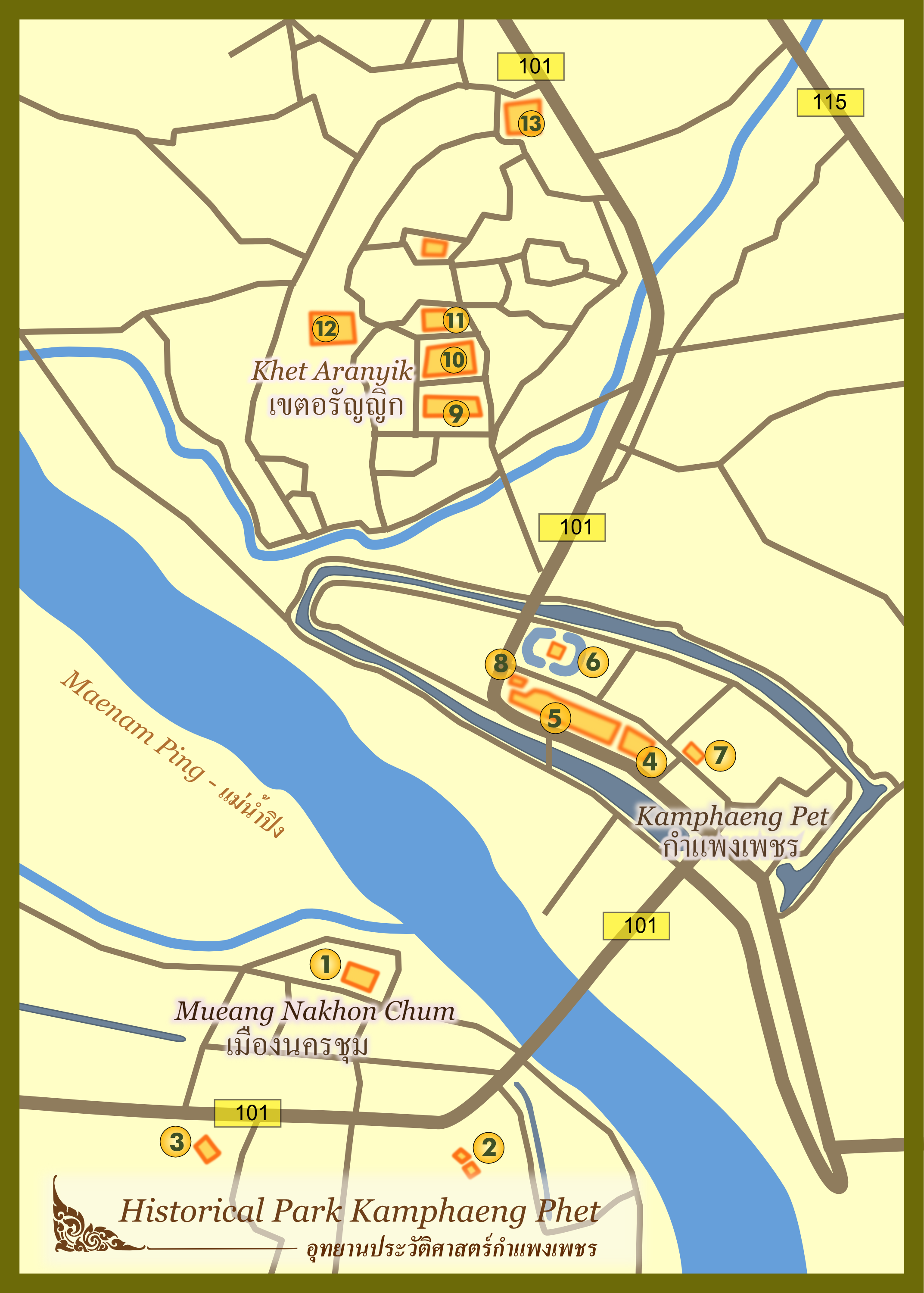
Map of Kamphaeng Phet Historical Park
