= Bueng Boraphet =

Lake in Thailand

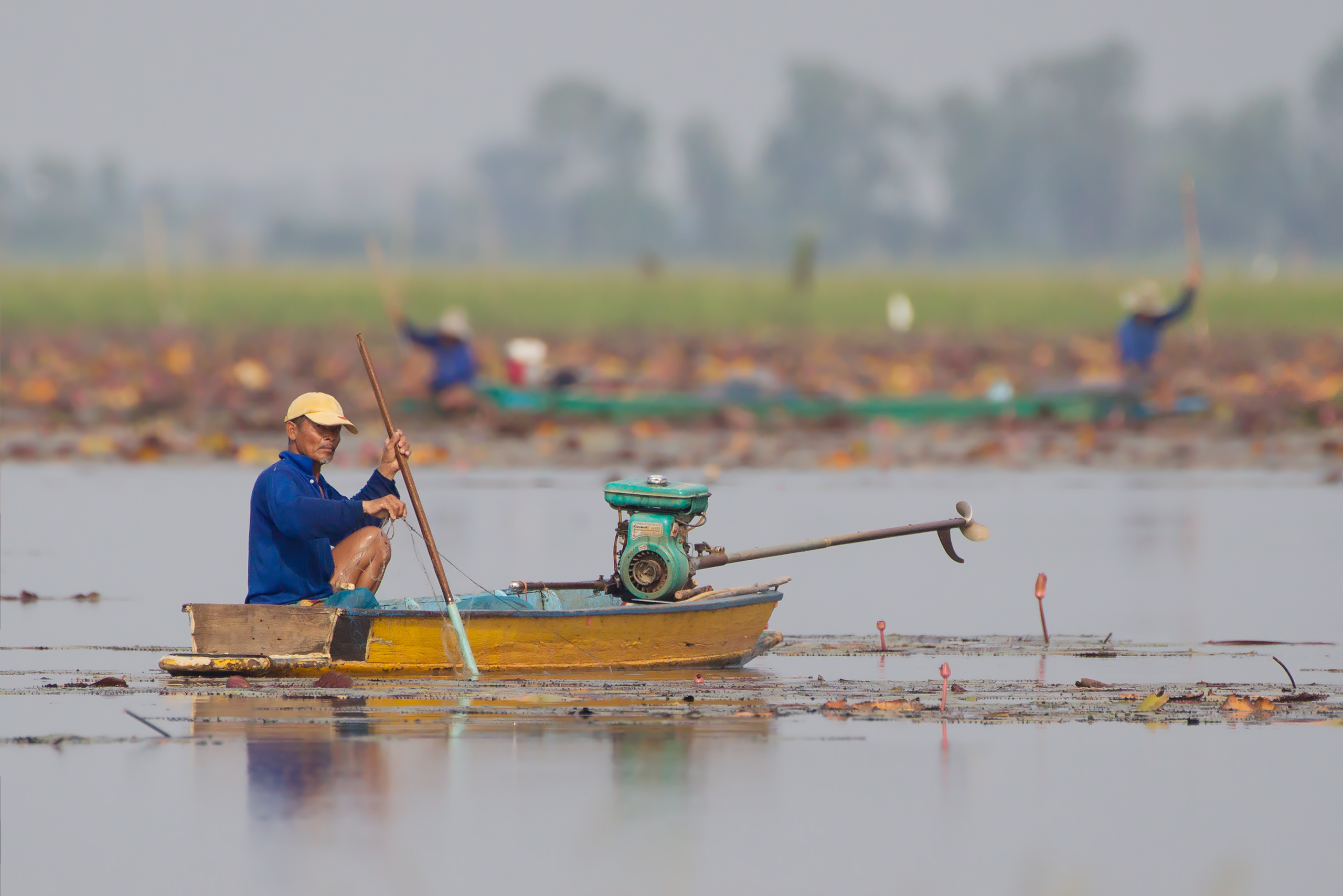
- Fishing on Bueng Boraphet

- Location within Thailand
- Location: Nakhon Sawan province, Central Thailand
- Coordinates: 15°41′N 100°15′E
- Primary outflows: Chao Phraya River
- Basin countries: Thailand
- Surface area: 224 km^{2} (86 sq mi)
- Surface elevation: 25 m (82 ft)
- Islands: 2
- Settlements: Nakhon Sawan

Bueng Boraphet (Thai: บึงบอระเพ็ด, pronounced [bɯ̄ŋ bɔ̄ː.rā.pʰét], lit. 'giloy swamp') is the largest freshwater swamp and lake in Central Thailand. It covers an area of 224 km^{2} east of Nakhon Sawan, south of the Nan River close to its confluence with the Ping River. This swamp is visible from the train window on the Northern Line, between Bueng Boraphet and Thap Krit stations.

Originally the area was covered by a large swamp, which was flooded in 1930 with the building of a dam to improve fishing.

This is the only known site for the white-eyed river martin which used to winter there, but has not been seen since 1980, and may be extinct.

Once, the Siamese tiger perch was considered the most iconic fish species here, so much so that people used to say, "If anyone comes to Bueng Borapet and doesn't eat this fish, it's as if they've never arrived." But now, it has likely become completely extinct in Bueng Boraphet due to overfishing, both for consumption and for the ornamental fish trade.

A near-threatened species, the marsh grassbird, was first discovered in Thailand here in early December 2019.

One hundred and six square kilometres of the lake were declared a non-hunting area in 1975. In 2000 it was designated a wetland of international importance by the Thai government.

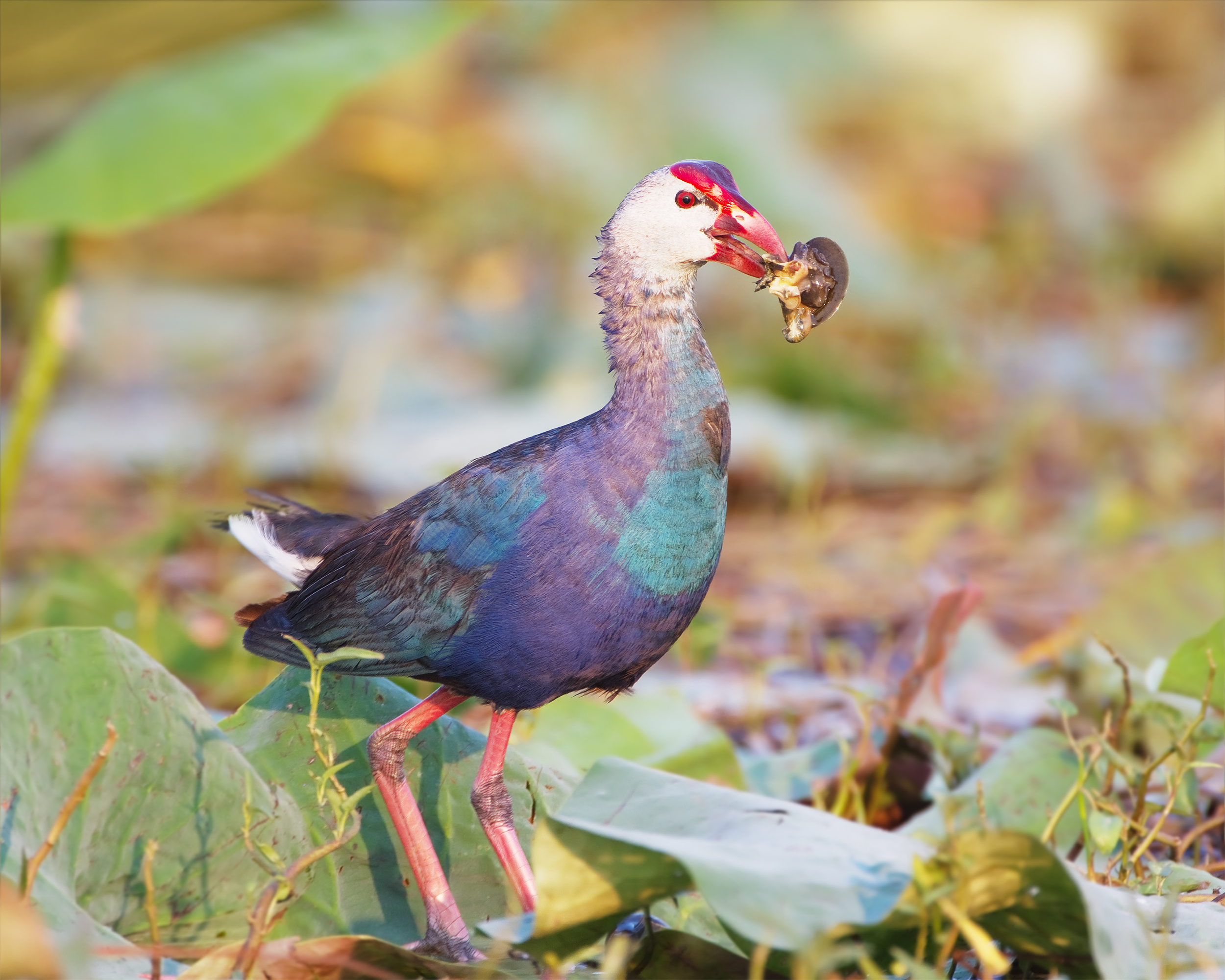
The grey-headed swamphen is one of a multitude of bird species that inhabit this lake

== Location ==
Map Bueng Boraphet Non-hunting Area

Bueng Boraphet Non-hunting Area in overview PARO 12 (Nakhon Sawan)

6) Bueng Boraphet Non-hunting Area in overview PARO 12 (Nakhon Sawan)

	National park
1	Khlong Lan
2	Khlong Wang Chao
3	Mae Wong
	Wildlife sanctuary
4	Huai Kha Khaeng
5	Khao Sanam Phriang

	Non-hunting area
6	Bueng Boraphet
7	Tham Phratun
	Forest park
8	Huai Khot
9	Khao Luang
10	Nakhon Chai Bowon
11	Tham Khao Wong
12	Tham Phet–Tham Thong

	Arboretum
13	Kanchana Kuman
14	Paisali

== See also ==
- DNP - Bueng Boraphet Non-hunting Area
