= Khlong Wang Chao National Park =

National park in Thailand

- คลองวังเจ้า
- IUCN category II (national park)
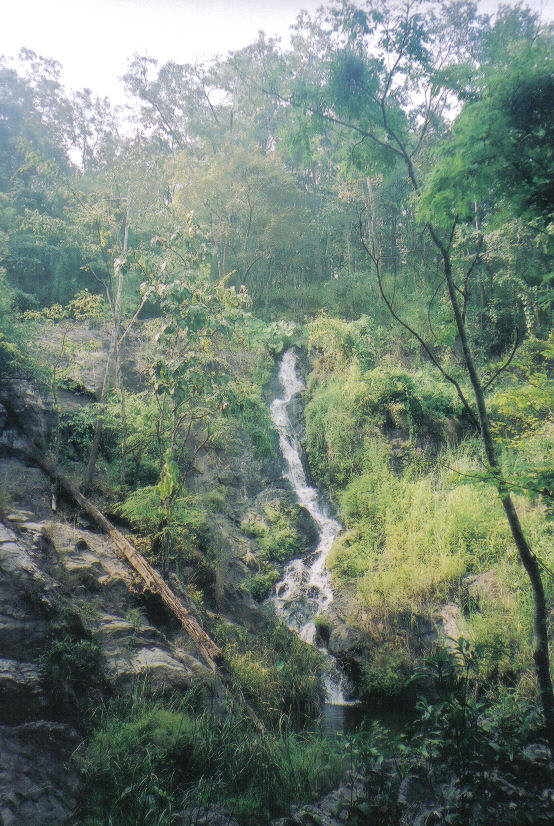
- Namtok Khlong Samo Kruai waterfall

- Location within Thailand
- Location: Kamphaeng Phet Province, Tak Province, Thailand
- Coordinates: 16.412°N 99.15°E
- Area: 747 km^{2} (288 mi^{2})
- Established: 1990
- Visitors: 33,370 (in 2019)
- Governing body: Department of National Parks, Wildlife and Plant Conservation

Khlong Wang Chao National Park (Thai คลองวังเจ้า) is a national park in Thailand.

== Description ==
Khlong Wang Chao National Park is situated in the Thanon Thong Chai Mountain Range. Most of the area consists of complicated mountains lying along the North and South. They are one part of Thanon Thong Chai Mountain Range and there is a plain area in their middle part which looks like two pan basins covering 3.2–8 km^{2} (1.2–3.1 mi^{2}). The important mountain ranges are Yen, Tao Dam, Tat Rup Khai, Mi, Bang Cha Le Mountains, Bang Sung Peak etc. Yen mountain located in the western park is the highest peak at about 1,898 metres (6,227 ft) above sea level, while the height of this area is about 300–2,000 metres (980–6,560 ft) above sea level.

This park lies in Wang Chao, Mueang Tak districts of Tak Province, Kosamphi Nakhon, Khlong Lan and Mueang Kamphaeng Phet districts of Kamphaeng Phet Province, the West of Thailand.

== History ==
On December 7, 1988, the Minister of Agriculture and Cooperative and parties have surveyed the condition of conservation, forest Khlong Wang Chao and Khlong Suan Mak Forests. They found the fertile and densely teak forest (Tectona grandis) and other features. They would like to conserve the forest, thus, Khlong Wang Chao National Park was gazetted on August 29, 1990 with an area of 466,875 rai ~ 747 square kilometres (288 sq mi) as the 63rd park of Thailand.

== Location ==
Khlong Wang Chao National Park in overview PARO 12 (Nakhon Sawan)

2) Khlong Wang Chao National Park in overview PARO 12

	National park
1	Khlong Lan
2	Khlong Wang Chao
3	Mae Wong
	Wildlife sanctuary
4	Huai Kha Khaeng
5	Khao Sanam Phriang

	Non-hunting area
6	Bueng Boraphet
7	Tham Phratun
	Forest park
8	Huai Khot
9	Khao Luang
10	Nakhon Chai Bowon
11	Tham Khao Wong
12	Tham Phet–Tham Thong

	Arboretum
13	Kanchana Kuman
14	Paisali

== See also ==
- List of national parks in Thailand
- DNP - Khlong Wang Chao National Park
- List of Protected Areas Regional Offices of Thailand
