= Protected area downgrading, downsizing, and degazettement =

Processes reducing nature conservation

Protected area downgrading, downsizing, and degazettement (PADDD) events are processes that change the legal status of national parks and other protected areas in both terrestrial and marine environments. "Downgrading" is "a decrease in legal restrictions on the number, magnitude, or extent of human activities within a protected area (i.e., legal authorization for increased human use)." "Downsizing" refers to a "decrease in size of a protected area as a result of excision of land or sea area through a legal boundary change." "Degazettement" is defined as a loss of legal protection for an entire national park or other protected area. Collectively, PADDD represents legal processes that temper regulations, shrink boundaries, or eliminate legal protections originally associated with establishment of a protected area.

== Extent, trends, and causes ==
PADDD is a phenomenon that has recently gained attention among scientists and policymakers. Scientific publications have identified 3,749 enacted PADDD events in 73 countries since 1892. Collectively, PADDD events have removed protections from at least 519,857 km^{2} and reduced restrictions in an additional 1,659,972 km^{2}.

While proximate causes of PADDD vary widely, most PADDD events globally (62%) are related to agriculture, mining, oil and gas, forestry, fisheries, and industrialization. Only 1.7% of PADDD events globally are associated with conservation planning.

PADDD is a historical and contemporary phenomenon. 78% of PADDD events worldwide were enacted since 2000 and 64% were enacted between 2008 and 2018. Governments in at least 24 countries have proposed 847 PADDD events; governments in at least 14 countries are currently considering at least 46 PADDD proposals.

PADDD has been studied and documented globally. Research on PADDD in Africa, Asia, and Latin America, which together contain most global conservation priorities and over 70% of all protected lands and waters, suggests significant tradeoffs between conservation and other policy objectives. In the absence of PADDD, four countries in Africa would have met 2020 targets for protected area coverage established under the Convention on Biological Diversity. In Brazil, PADDD events eliminated 6% of the total potential terrestrial protected area estate. These PADDD events were primarily associated with hydropower and rural human settlements. Research on PADDD in Australia has identified over 1,500 PADDD events, mostly associated with downgrading protections. Collectively, these PADDD events impacted over one-third of Australia's protected area network.

== Consequences ==
PADDD challenges longstanding assumptions that underlie established conservation strategies. For example, the assumption that protected areas are permanent fixtures on the landscape is foundational to Reducing Emissions from Deforestation and Forest Degradation (REDD+) policies. Research on PADDD in three REDD+ priority countries (Malaysia, Peru, and Democratic Republic of the Congo) identified that rates of forest carbon emissions and deforestation were substantially higher in PADDDed forests relative to protected areas and slightly higher in PADDDed forests relative to never-protected areas. Furthermore, iconic protected areas are not immune to PADDD. UNESCO World Heritage Sites, including Yasuníi National Park (Ecuador) and Virunga National Park (DRC), have been subject to 23 enacted and proposed PADDD events. A case study of Yosemite National Park revealed that PADDD reduced the size of the park by 30% and lands that were removed from protection (downsized) were more fragmented than protected lands.

Protected areas are among the most effective conservation measures, critical to global efforts to safeguard species and mitigate the impacts of climate change. Rolling back protections for industrial-scale extraction may compromise biodiversity conservation efforts and ecosystem services afforded by protected areas.

== Implications ==
PADDD suggests that conservation success is dependent not only on the creation of new protected areas but also the maintenance of existing protected areas. Scientists highlight the need for decision-makers to consider protected area characteristics and the socioeconomic context in which they are situated to better ensure their permanence. Research has indicated that less effective protected areas, in which deforestation rates were similar to unprotected sites nearby, were more likely to be degazetted. These findings suggest that bolstering the ecological benefits of protected areas may improve their durability. Scientists have suggested that the global PADDD trend could be combatted via a systematic programme of protected area "upgrading," whereby conserved wild areas are expanded via the purchase or gazetting of surrounding territory. Successful examples of protected-area upgrading include Gorongosa National Park in Mozambique and the Guanacaste Conservation Area in Costa Rica.

== Ongoing discussion and responses ==
PADDD was a topic of discussion at the World Parks Congress in Sydney, Australia, in November, 2014. PADDD was included in Motion 026 of the IUCN World Conservation Congress in Honolulu, Hawaii in 2016: "The World Conservation Congress, at its session in Hawaiʻi, United States of America, 1–10 September 2016...Calls on governments not to de-gazette, downgrade or alter the boundaries of all categories of protected areas to facilitate environmentally damaging industrial activities and infrastructure development."

IUCN 2020 World Conservation Congress Resolution 084 calls for a Global Response to PADDD, calling on IUCN members to strengthen protected areas; acknowledge the risks associated with unrestrained and poorly-governed PADDD for biodiversity conservation; refrain from enacting or investing in PADDD events that will lead to further extensive development.

Ongoing responses to PADDD include Project Finance for Permanence (PFP), which is an innovative method to secure permanent funding for conservation areas. The largest PFP, Amazon Region Protected Areas (ARPA), permanently financed conservation initiatives in 15 percent of the Brazilian Amazon.

The Legacy Landscapes Fund is an initiative to support protected areas for the long-term. It aims to support 30 protected areas by 2030 with sustainable funding totaling $1B USD.

Ongoing debates surrounding PADDD events around the world appear regularly in the media; see PADDDtracker Twitter and Parkwire for examples.

Several additional studies have highlighted PADDD around the world including: China (Ma et al, Huang et al), Bhutan (Dorji et al), South Africa (De Vos et al), Mexico (Lebreton, Depraz et al), the Caucasus region (Mancheno et al), Ecuador (López Sandoval et al) and Brazil (Laue & Arima, Bernard et al, Correia et al, Villen et al).

== PADDDtracker website ==
PADDDtracker.org is the most comprehensive database of legal rollbacks to national parks and other protected areas around the world. The website contains publicly accessible data and maps on global PADDD events collected systematically, opportunistically, and through crowdsourcing. Data available to download on PADDDtracker have been validated following peer-review. Members of the public with information about changes to protected areas can contribute to PADDDtracker. Conservation International and World Wildlife Fund review and manage the database.
