= Nakhon Chum =

Nakhon Chum may refer to the following places:

- Nakhon Chum, Ban Pong district, Ratchaburi Province, Thailand
  - Nakhon Chum railway station
- Nakhon Chum, Phitsanulok, Thailand
- Nakhon Chum, Mueang Kamphaeng Phet, a tambon in Thailand
