= Khlong Lan National Park =

National park in Thailand

- อุทยานแห่งชาติคลองลาน
- IUCN category II (national park)
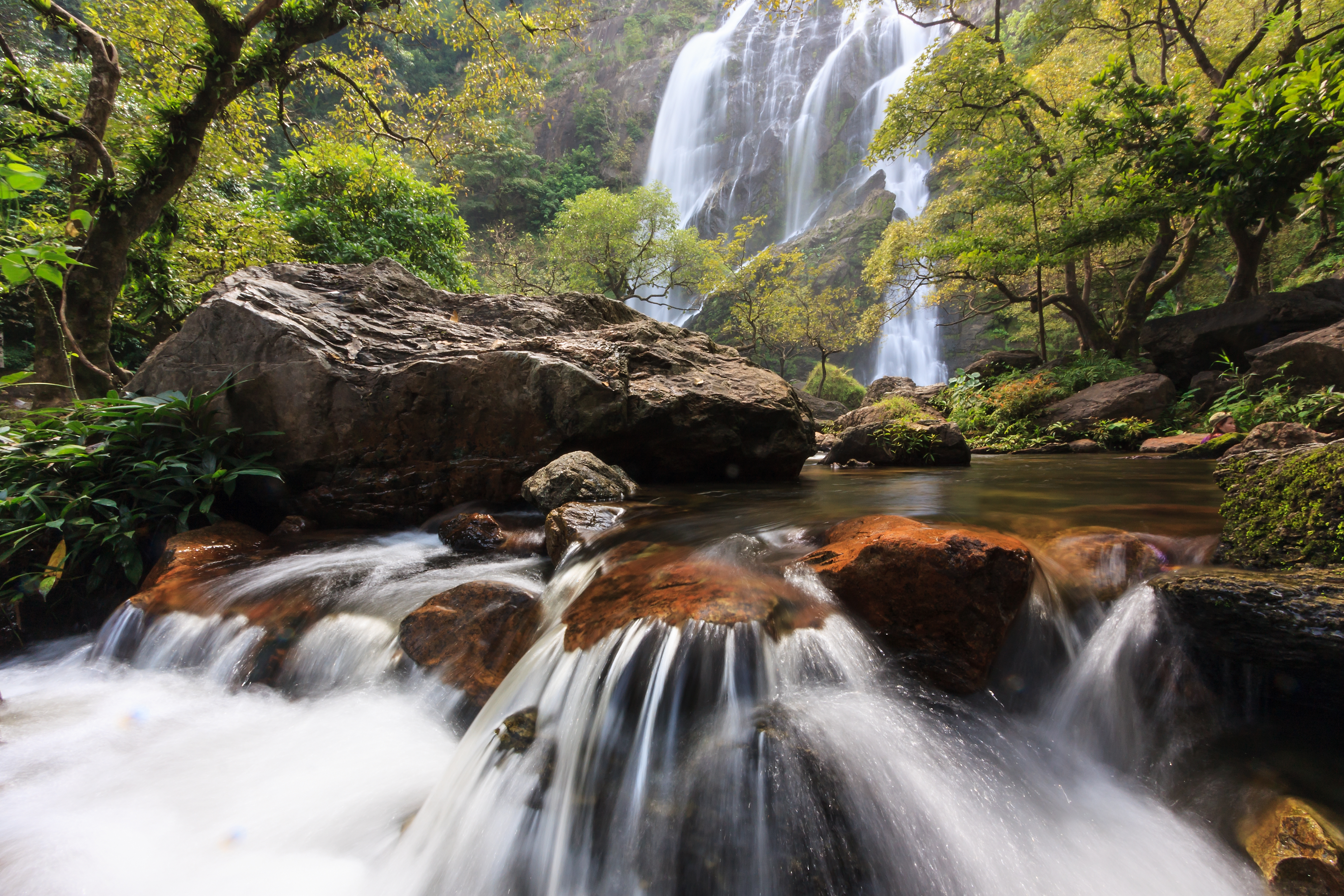
- Waterfall in Khlong Lan National Park
- Interactive map of Khlong Lan National Park
- Location: Kamphaeng Phet Province, Thailand
- Nearest city: Kamphaeng Phet
- Coordinates: 16.159°N 99.19°E
- Area: 300 km^{2} (120 sq mi)
- Established: 25 December 1985
- Visitors: 206,407 (in 2019)
- Governing body: Department of National Park, Wildlife and Plant Conservation (DNP)

Khlong Lan National Park (Thai อุทยานแห่งชาติคลองลาน) is a 300 km^{2} (120 mi^{2}) national park in Thailand.

== Description ==
Khlong Lan National Park is situated in the Dawna Mountain Range.

This park lies in Khlong Lan and Mueang Kamphaeng Phet districts of Kamphaeng Phet Province, the Lower north of Thailand and occupies 187,500 rai ~ 300 square kilometres (120 sq mi).

The park is rugged and hilly along the Dawna Range, and is covered by fertile forest. Each mountain connects to Khun Khlong Lan, the highest peak at 1,439 metres (4,721 ft) above sea level. It's the origin of Khlong Khlung and Khlong Suan Mak, the tributaries of the Ping River. The famous places in the park are Khlong Lan and Khlong Nam Lai Waterfalls.

== History ==
The park was declared a national park on 25 December 1985 as the 44th park of Thailand.

== Location ==
Khlong Lang National Park in overview PARO 12 (Nakhon Sawan)

1) Khlong Lang National Park in overview PARO 12

| | National park |
| 1 | Khlong Lan |
| 2 | Khlong Wang Chao |
| 3 | Mae Wong |
| | Wildlife sanctuary |
| 4 | Huai Kha Khaeng |
| 5 | Khao Sanam Phriang |

| | Non-hunting area |
| 6 | Bueng Boraphet |
| 7 | Tham Phratun |
| | Forest park |
| 8 | Huai Khot |
| 9 | Khao Luang |
| 10 | Nakhon Chai Bowon |
| 11 | Tham Khao Wong |
| 12 | Tham Phet–Tham Thong |

| | Arboretum |
| 13 | Kanchana Kuman |
| 14 | Paisali |

== See also ==
- List of national parks in Thailand
- DNP - Khlong Lan National Park
- List of Protected Areas Regional Offices of Thailand
