= Mae Wong National Park =

National park in Thailand

- อุทยานแห่งชาติแม่วงก์
- IUCN category II (national park)
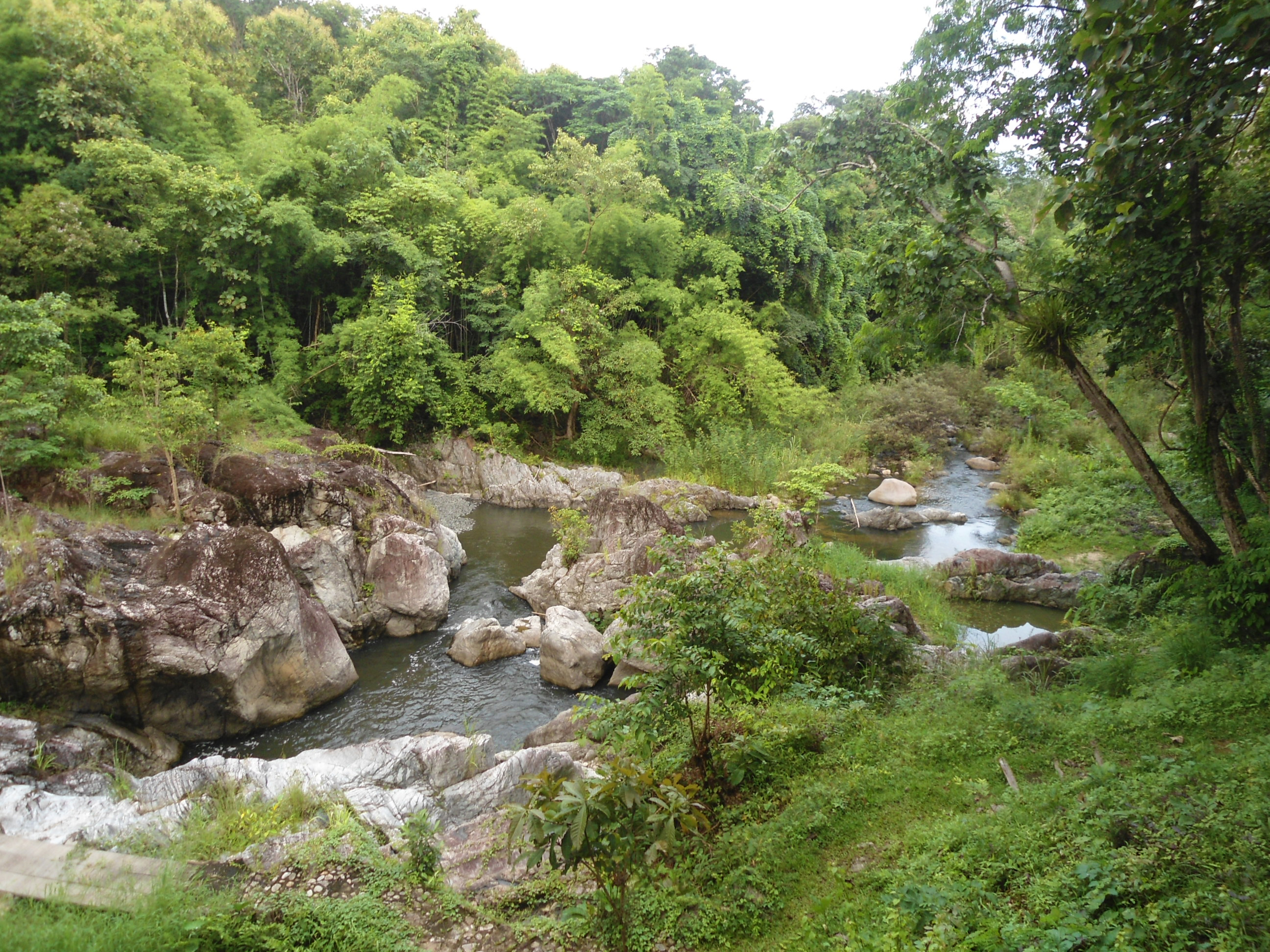
- Khong Klung creek

- Location within Thailand
- Location: Thailand
- Nearest city: Nakhon Sawan
- Coordinates: 16°02′23″N 99°14′04″E
- Area: 894 km^{2} (345 sq mi)
- Established: 1987
- Visitors: 51,826 (in 2019)
- Governing body: Department of National Parks, Wildlife and Plant Conservation

Mae Wong National Park (Thai: อุทยานแห่งชาติแม่วงก์) is a national park in Thailand. This park lies in Mae Wong and Mae Poen Districts of Nakhon Sawan Province and Pang Sila Thong District of Kamphaeng Phet Province, in the west of Thailand. It was declared a national park on 14 September 1987 as the 54th national park of Thailand, with an area of 558,750 rai ~ 894 square kilometres (345 sq mi).

== Description ==
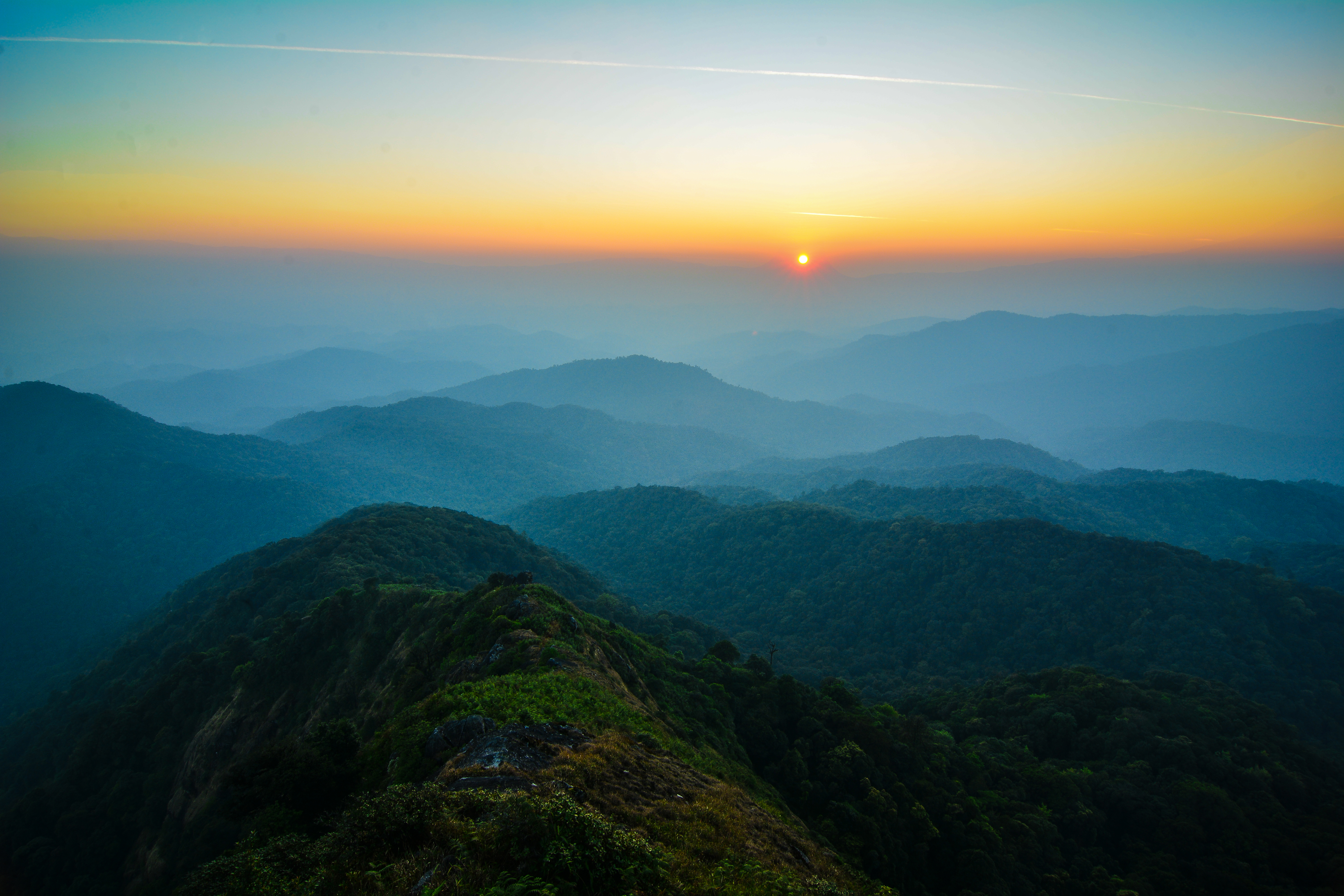
The setting sun seen from the top of Mu Ko Chu mountain (1,964 m)

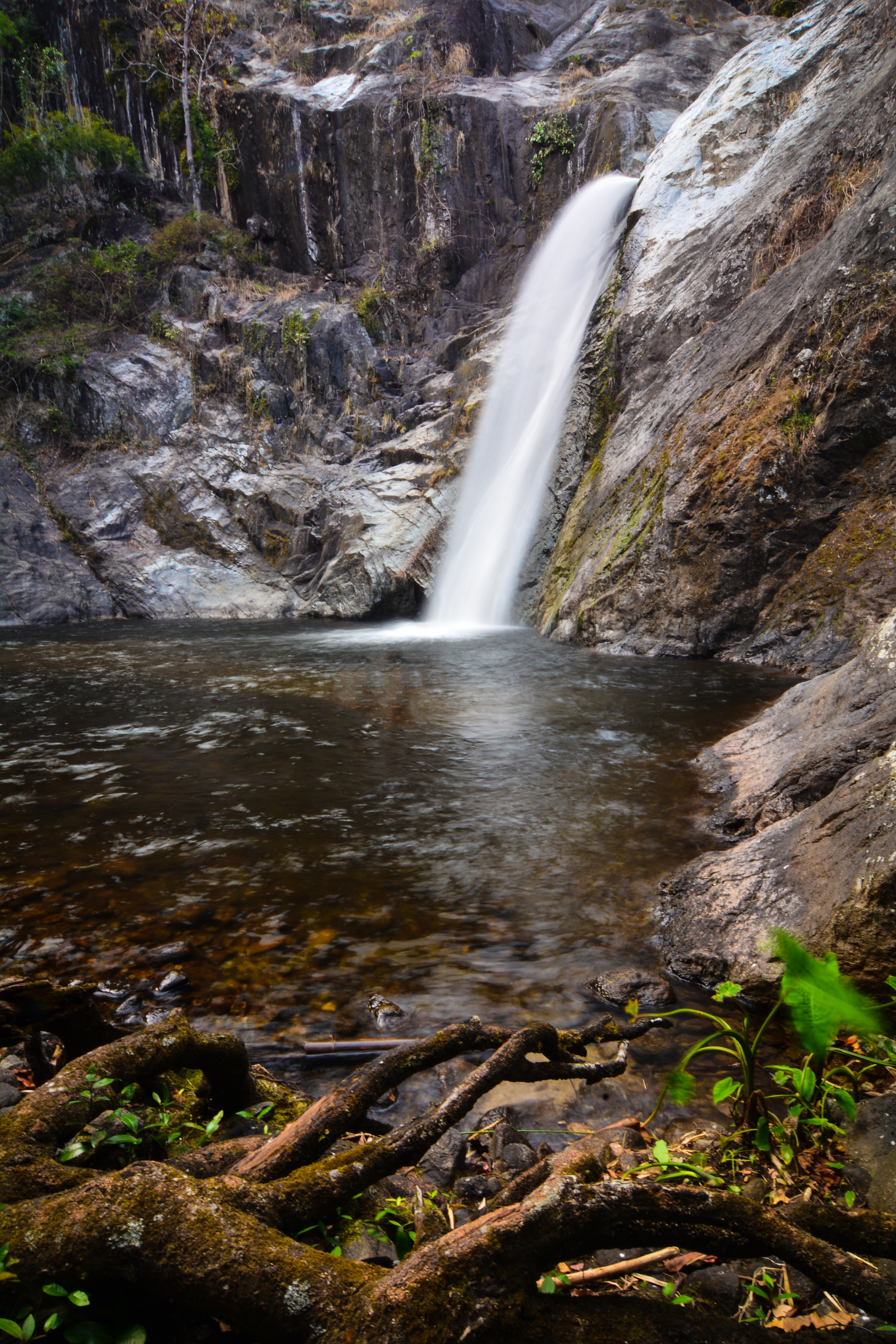
Mae Rewa waterfalls

Mae Wong National Park is in the Dawna Range. The park is rugged and hilly along the Dawna Mountain Range, especially on the north and west. With the highest peak, Khao Mo Ko Chu at 1,964 m. above sea level it is one of highest mountain ranges in Thailand. Three main rivers, of which the Mae Wong River is the biggest, drain the park. Notable places in the park are Mae Krasa, Mae Rewa, Mae Ki Waterfalls, Mokochu Peak, and Chong Yen.

== History ==
Formerly, Mae Wong National Park was home to hill tribes including Hmong, Yao, Muzer (Lahu), and Karen.

== Mae Wong Dam ==
On 10 April 2012 Thailand's cabinet approved the 13 billion baht Mae Wong Dam project in response to water shortages in the dry season and heavy floods in the wet season. Opponents of the project state that it will eliminate around 1,760 hectares (17.6 km^{2}) of low-lying forest, and reduce the habitat for animals in the national park which covers 900 km^{2}. In July 2012 a case was filed at Central Administrative Court, against Yingluck Shinawatra, the cabinet, the director-general of the Royal Irrigation Department, and the Minister of Agriculture and Cooperatives. On 22 September 2013 the Bangkok Post said that in Bangkok "Thousands of supporters turned out on Sunday to welcome the environmental campaigner Sasin Chalermlap, who arrived in Bangkok after a 388 kilometre walk to protest plans to build a dam in Mae Wong National Park". Days later the Thai government announced that they will study a new alternative to the dam. During a November 2013 hearing, locals reportedly supported the project and asked the government to pursue it. On 23 September 2013, the Minister of Science and Technology stated that construction of the dam will push forward.

In September 2016, plans to build the dam were revived by Agriculture and Cooperatives Minister Chatchai Sarikulya. The minister has been reportedly seeking an order under Section 44 of the interim charter to press ahead with the project.

== Location ==
Mae Wong National Park in overview PARO 12 (Nakhon Sawan)

3) Mae Wong National Park in overview PARO 12

	National park
1	Khlong Lan
2	Khlong Wang Chao
3	Mae Wong
	Wildlife sanctuary
4	Huai Kha Khaeng
5	Khao Sanam Phriang

	Non-hunting area
6	Bueng Boraphet
7	Tham Phratun
	Forest park
8	Huai Khot
9	Khao Luang
10	Nakhon Chai Bowon
11	Tham Khao Wong
12	Tham Phet–Tham Thong

	Arboretum
13	Kanchana Kuman
14	Paisali

== See also ==
- List of national parks in Thailand
- DNP - Mae Wong National Park
- List of Protected Areas Regional Offices of Thailand
