= List of rail accidents in Thailand =

Several rail accidents have occurred in Thailand since the introduction of rail transport in the country in the late 19th century.

== 20th century ==
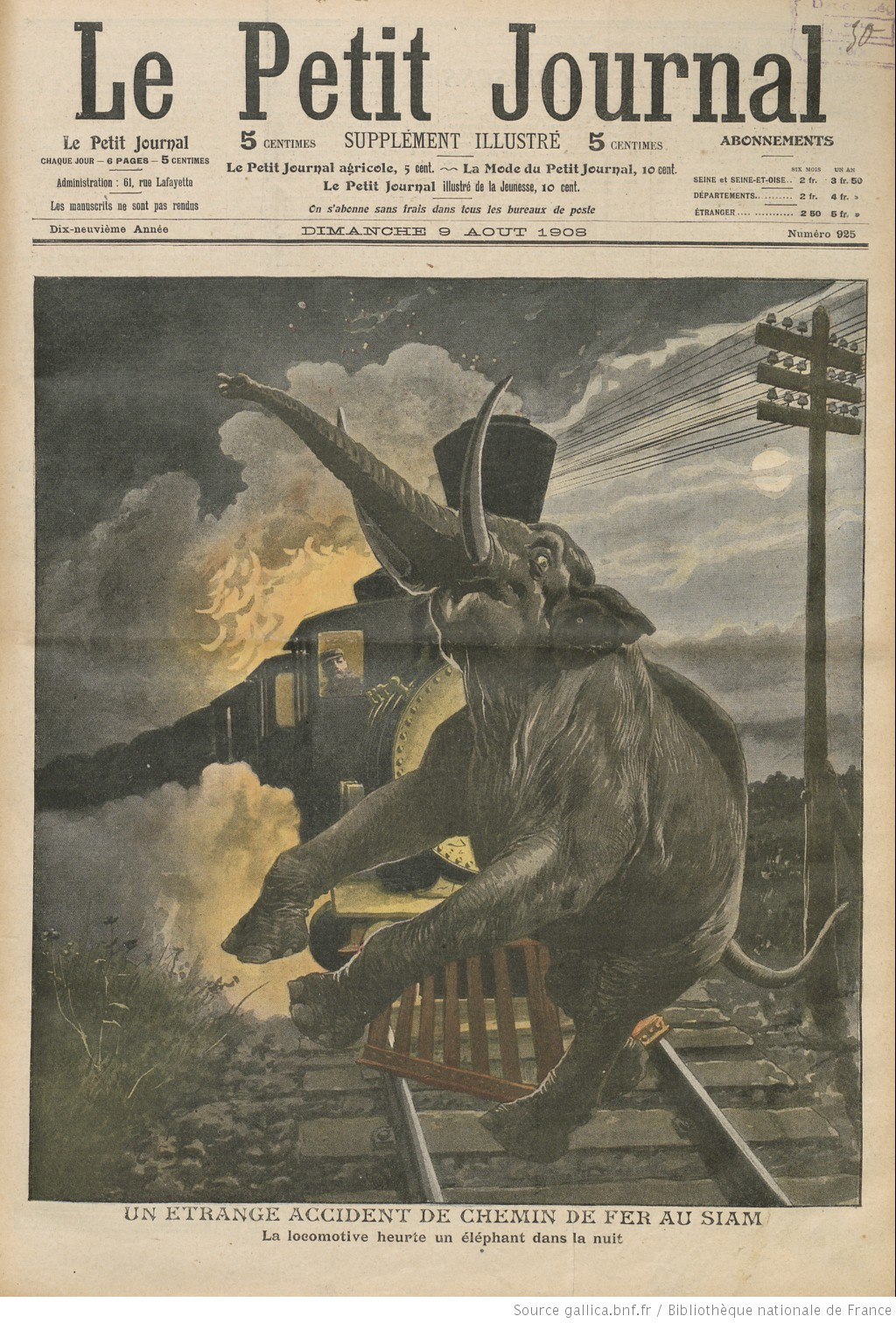
Cover of Le Petit Journal, showing an artist's impression of the 1908 accident

- 4 June 1908: A train from Nakhon Ratchasima collided with an elephant that had wandered onto the tracks at night, between Chaing Rak Yai and Chiang Rak Noi stations, killing three crew and derailing 13 of 26 cars.
- 2 April 1979: A train struck an oil tanker near Bangkok, killing at least 20 and injuring dozens of others.
- 1 August 1979: 1979 Bangkok train collision: A train approaching the switch in Taling Chan Junction yard and collided with a freight train from Bang Sue Junction, having gone through a red signal. Fifty-one people were killed and 138 injured. It remains Thailand's worst railway disaster.
- 8 November 1986: Six runaway, unmanned, coupled locomotives which had their engines left on due to maintenance works at Bang Sue Depot collided at Bangkok railway station, killing four and injuring four.
- 23 May 1989: Rapid Train No.38 collided with an overhanging cliff between Pang Puai railway station, Lampang Province and Pha Khan railway station, Phrae Province. Eight carriages fell off the mountainside, resulting in eight deaths and 139 injuries.
- 2 April 1995: Express Train No. 13 collided with a ten-wheel truck between Prachuap Khiri Khan railway station and Nong Hin railway station, Prachuap Khiri Khan Province. The locomotive caught fire after the collision, killing the train driver, the engineer, and the truck driver. Several passenger coaches derailed, resulting in a total of 17 deaths and many more injuries.
- 26 June 1998: Rapid Train No. 38 collided with an overhanging cliff between Pha Khan railway station and Ban Pin railway station, Phrae Province. Three people were killed with an unspecified number of injuries.

== 21st century ==
=== 2000s ===
- 17 January 2005: (Bangkok) A collision of two metro trains on the newly opened MRT Blue Line injured 140 passengers.
- 5 October 2009: 2009 Khao Tao train derailment: A passenger train derailed in Hua Hin at 04:50 local time (21:50 on October 4 UTC) in a rainstorm. At least seven people were killed and dozens were injured.
- A train crashed into a pickup truck at a railroad crossing in Prachuap Khiri Khan. One dead, two injured.

=== 2010s ===
- 6 April 2013: A train derailed near Lak Si railway station, Bangkok due to suspected rail fastening spike theft. There were no casualties.
- 26 March 2015: 2015 Phachi collision: Rapid Train No.107 collided with Express Train No.69 near Ban Don Klang railway halt, Phra Nakhon Si Ayutthaya Province, injuring more than 40 people.
- 8 January 2016: Ordinary Train No.255 collided with a runaway cattle truck at a level crossing between Phetchaburi railway station and Khao Thamon railway station, Phetchaburi Province, killing three and injuring 34.
- 3 April 2016: Excursion Train No.909 collided with a bus at a level crossing near Wat Ngiu Rai railway station, Nakhon Pathom Province, killing three and injuring 27.
- 1 March 2018: Express Train No.83 derailed over a curve between Huai Yot railway station and Trang railway station, Trang Province. There were no casualties.
- 1 March 2018: Freight Train No.1552 derailed over a railway switch at Bang Klam railway station, Songkhla Province. There were no casualties.

=== 2020s ===
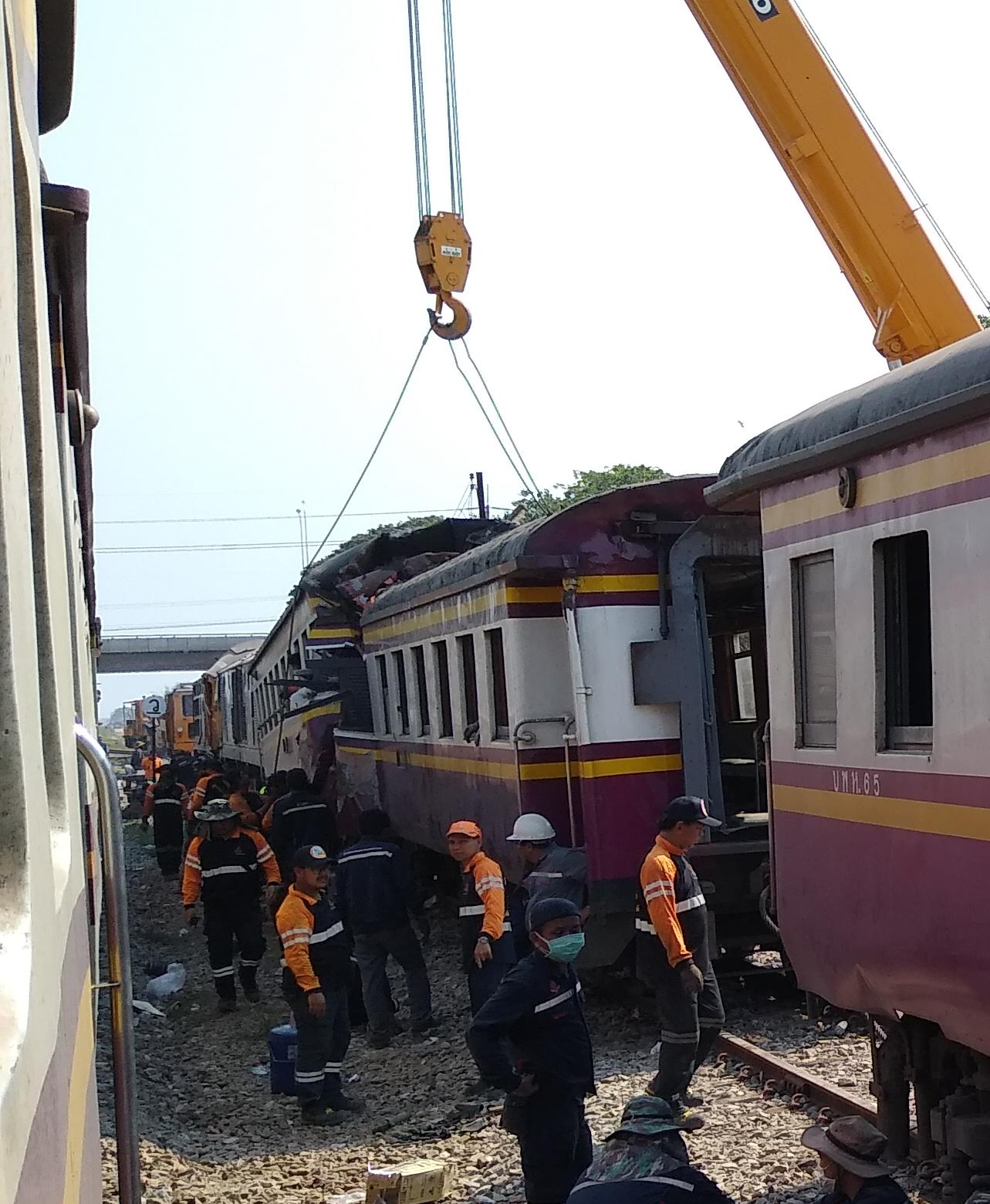
Wreckage being cleared at Pak Tho station, Thailand

- 24 February 2020: Thaksin Express No.37/45 collided with Freight Train No.722 at Pak Tho railway station, Ratchaburi Province. Forty-two people were injured.
- 10 July 2020: Ordinary Train No. 201 derailed over a railway switch at Ban Mai railway station, Phitsanulok Province. There were no casualties.
- 11 October 2020: Freight Train No.852 collided with a bus at a level crossing near Khlong Khwaeng Klan railway halt, Chachoengsao Province. Nineteen passengers on the bus were killed and 40 were injured.
- 2 January 2022: Rapid Train No.172 derailed over a railway switch at Rueso railway station, Narathiwat Province. There were no casualties.
- 31 January 2022: Rapid Train No.134 collided with a truck trailer at a railway crossing near Nong Khon Kwang railway station, Udon Thani Province. Two train crew were killed.

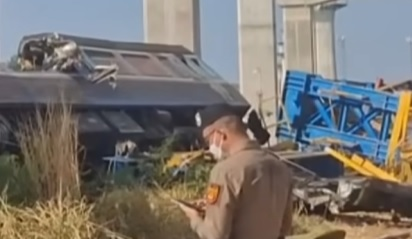
Sikhio train disaster

- 14 January 2026: Sikhio train disaster: A construction crane fell on a passenger train with 157 people on board in Sikhio district, Nakhon Ratchasima province, killing 30 people.
- 16 May 2026: 2026 Bangkok train collision: Freight Train No. 2126 collided with BMTA's route 206 air-conditioned bus while the bus was stopped at a red light on Asok–Din Daeng Road near Makkasan station in Bangkok. The bus caught fire and was completely destroyed after being crushed between the train and a concrete pillar. Eight people were killed, 32 were injured, and 2 were critically injured. The crossing barrier had not come down.

== See also ==
- Lists of rail accidents by country
