= 2009 Khao Tao train derailment =

Railway incident in Thailand

Details
- Date: 5 October 2009; 04:20
- Location: Khao Tao railway station, Hua Hin district, Prachuap Khiri Khan province
- Country: Thailand
- Line: Southern Line, Thailand
- Operator: State Railway of Thailand
- Incident type: Derailment
- Cause: Overspeeding; suspected driver fatigue

Statistics
- Trains: 1
- Deaths: 7
- Injured: 88
- Damage: 6 carriages derailed

The 2009 Khao Tao collision was a railway accident that occurred on 5 October 2009 near Khao Tao railway station in Hua Hin District, Prachuap Khiri Khan Province, Thailand.

== History ==
An express train traveling from Trang to Bangkok derailed while entering a passing loop at high speed, killing at least 7 people and injuring 88 of others.

The investigations suggested that the accident may have been caused by driver error after the train failed to stop at a signal before entering the station.

== Impact ==
The accident was widely reported in media. The accident triggered an emergency response, with rescue teams deployed to the crash site and train services on the Southern Line temporarily suspended. A subsequent investigation was carried out by the State Railway of Thailand into the circumstances of the derailment, including driver error and signal compliance.

The derailment was considered one of the most serious railway accidents in Thailand since 1979 Bangkok train collision. The State Railway Workers' Union of Thailand (SRUT) organised a nationwide rail safety campaign following the fatal train derailment.

== See also ==
- 1979 Bangkok train collision
- 2015 Phachi collision
- 2026 Sikhio train disaster
- 2026 Bangkok train collision
- Khao Tao railway station
