= 1979 Bangkok train collision =

Railway incident in Bangkok, Thailand

Details
- Date: 1 August 1979
- Location: Taling Chan Junction, Bangkok
- Country: Thailand
- Line: Southern Line (Thailand)
- Operator: State Railway of Thailand
- Incident type: Railway collision
- Cause: Signal passed at danger; failure to stop at red signal (reported)

Statistics
- Trains: 2
- Deaths: 51
- Injured: 138
- Damage: Multiple carriages derailed and destroyed

The 1979 Bangkok train collision was a major railway accident that occurred on 1 August 1979 in the Taling Chan Junction area of Bangkok, Thailand.

== History ==
A passenger train passed a red signal and collided with a freight train, resulting in a derailment and severe destruction of multiple carriages. The disaster killed 51 people and injured 138 others, and is regarded as one of the deadliest railway accidents in Thailand’s history.

On 28 January 1991, the Bangkok Military Court sentenced both the signalman and the freight train driver to four years’ imprisonment for negligence that caused deaths and serious injuries.

== See also ==
- 2009 Khao Tao train derailment
- 2015 Phachi collision
- 2026 Sikhio train disaster
- 2026 Bangkok train collision
