= 2018 Thai panther poaching case =

2018 crime in Thailand

A high-profile case involving the poaching of a black panther and other protected wildlife took place in Thailand in February 2018. It involved a group led by Premchai Karnasuta, president of Italian-Thai Development, one of the country's largest construction firms, in the Thung Yai Naresuan Wildlife Sanctuary. Premchai and three associates were arrested by park rangers, who found them in possession of weapons and hunting equipment and the carcasses of a black leopard, a Kalij pheasant and a barking deer at a camp in the wildlife sanctuary on 4 February.

The case generated public pressure over accountability to the law of the wealthy and influential, amid concerns that Premchai might avoid punishment. After appeals, a final judgement by the Supreme Court in December 2021 found Premchai, his driver and his hunting guide guilty of hunting and possessing wildlife carcasses. They were given prison sentences ranging from three years and two months to three years and nine months, and ordered to pay two million baht (US$60,000) in damages.

== See also ==
- Death of Wichian Klanprasert, a 2012 hit-and-run involving a wealthy suspect who avoided facing justice
