= Laytongku =

Laytongku เลตองคุ
- Village
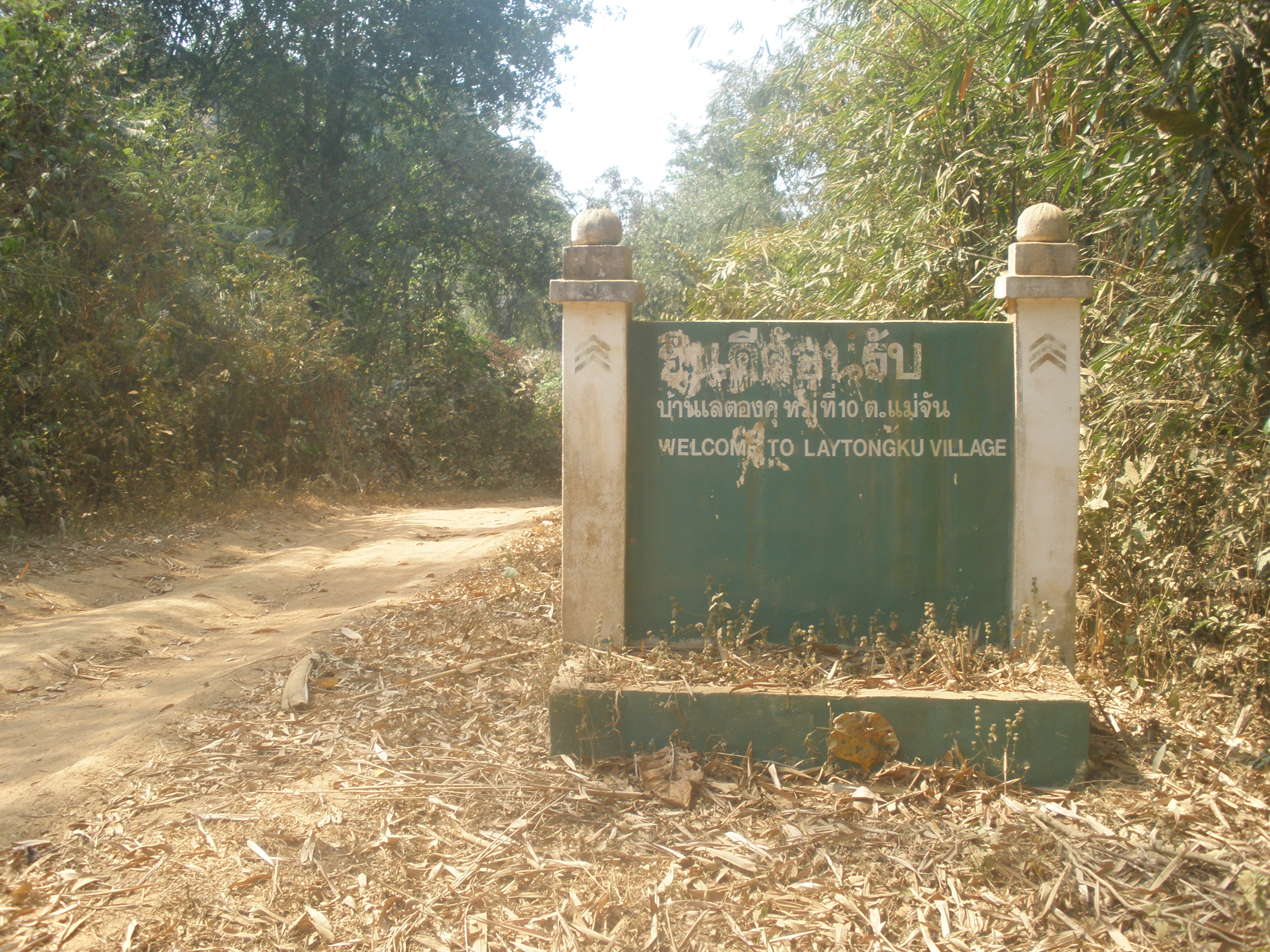
- Entrance marker for the village of Laytongku
- Country: Thailand

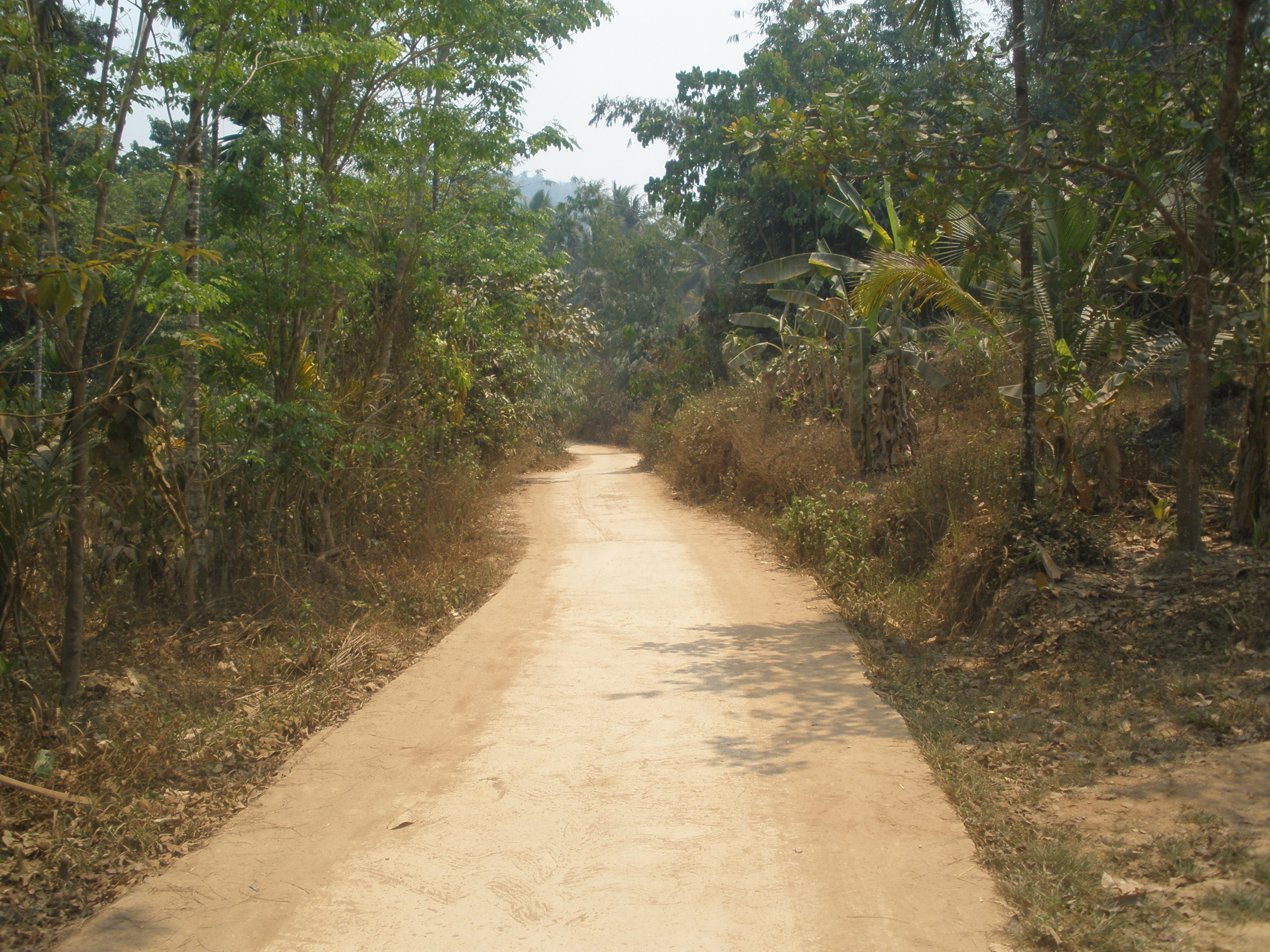
The road as it goes through but not into the Village of Laytongku. The village and its Talaku Karen sacred compound is some distance from the road. Entry is only allowed to visitors who have a permit previously applied for and received in Bangkok. No accommodations are available for an over night stay in the village even with a permit to enter.

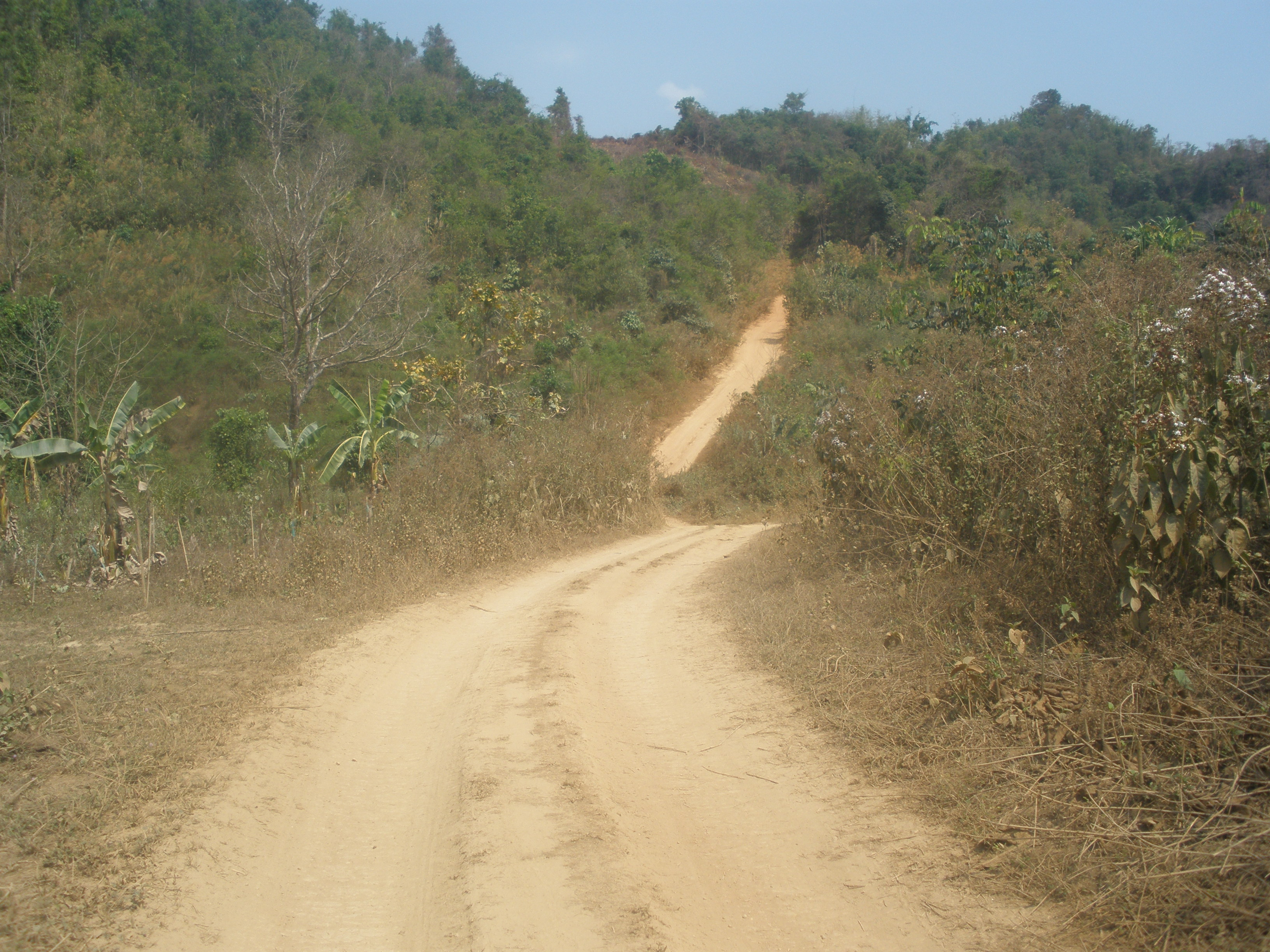
Road leading away from the village of Laytongku

Laytongku or Lay Tong Ku (Thai: เลตองคุ, RTGS: Letongkhu) in S'gaw Karen: Letawkho, is a Karen village on the south-western tip of Tambon Mae Chan Subdistrict of Umphang District in Thailand's Tak Province and the extreme north-western tip of Kanchanaburi Province. It is located in a valley of the Dawna Range, within the area of Thungyai Naresuan Wildlife Sanctuary and Umphang Wildlife Sanctuary. It is inhabited by an (orthodox) animist Talaku, 'S'gaw Karen', or (Telekhon) Karen Hill Tribe and is the location of the centuries long site of the principal animist shrine (sanctuary) for the Talaku (Telekhon) Karen faith.

Laytongku appeared in the news in 2017 because of an unauthorized removal of an ancient pair of elephant tusks held sacred by the villagers.

The village is located on the Thai-Myanmar border along the border of the Karen State of Burma.
