= Collapse of Thailand State Audit Office building =

Construction site collapse in Bangkok, Thailand

- Part of the 2025 Myanmar earthquake
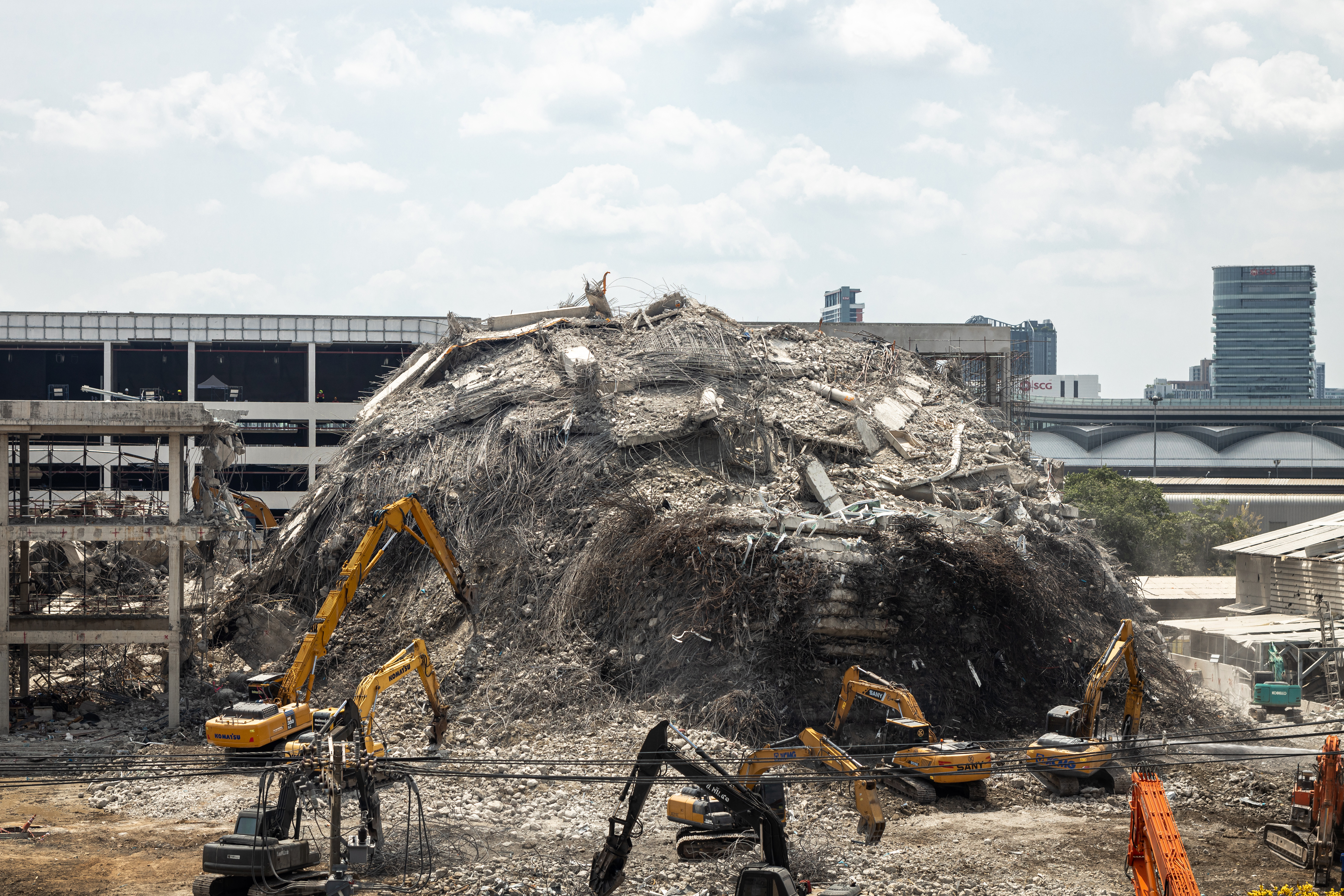
- Debris pile, seen on 5 April 2025
- Date: 28 March 2025
- Location: Kamphaeng Phet 2 Road, Chatuchak District, Bangkok; 13°48′8″N 100°32′50″E
- Type: Structural failure
- Cause: 2025 Myanmar earthquake, exacerbated by poor structural integrity
- Deaths: 96
- Injuries: 9

On 28 March 2025, a building under construction which was intended for the State Audit Office collapsed in Bangkok, Thailand, following a devastating earthquake that occurred in Myanmar. It resulted in 96 deaths and 9 injuries. Already topped-out, the building was 30% complete and, at the time of collapse, undergoing piping and glass wall installation. The skyscraper was the only building in Thailand that was collapsed by the earthquake, and the collapse was one of the deadliest single instances of structural failure in Thailand's history.

== Background ==
The State Audit Office building as seen from the Chatuchak Park on 9 March 2025, 19 days before the collapse

The skyscraper, located on Kamphaeng Phet Road, next to Krung Thep Aphiwat Central Terminal and near the Chatuchak Weekend Market in Bangkok, was 33 stories tall, with a height of 137 m or 449 ft, prior to the collapse.

The construction project budget was 2.136 billion baht (USD 63 million), had started in 2020 and the contractors were the joint venture between Italian-Thai Development and China Railways Number 10 (Thailand) Co., Ltd.

In April 2024, the building was topped out by China Railway No.10 Engineering Group.

At the time of the earthquake, the glass facade and internal installations were being added.

== Collapse ==
On 28 March 2025 at 12:50:52 MMT (06:20:52 UTC), a M_{w} 7.7 strike-slip earthquake struck the Sagaing Region of Myanmar, with an epicenter close to Mandalay, the country's second-largest city. Despite Bangkok being located more than 1,000 kilometers from the epicenter, heavy shaking was felt in the city due to the supershear nature of the seismic rupture and Bangkok's soft soil amplifying the energy released by the earthquake, which led to the collapse.

== Response ==
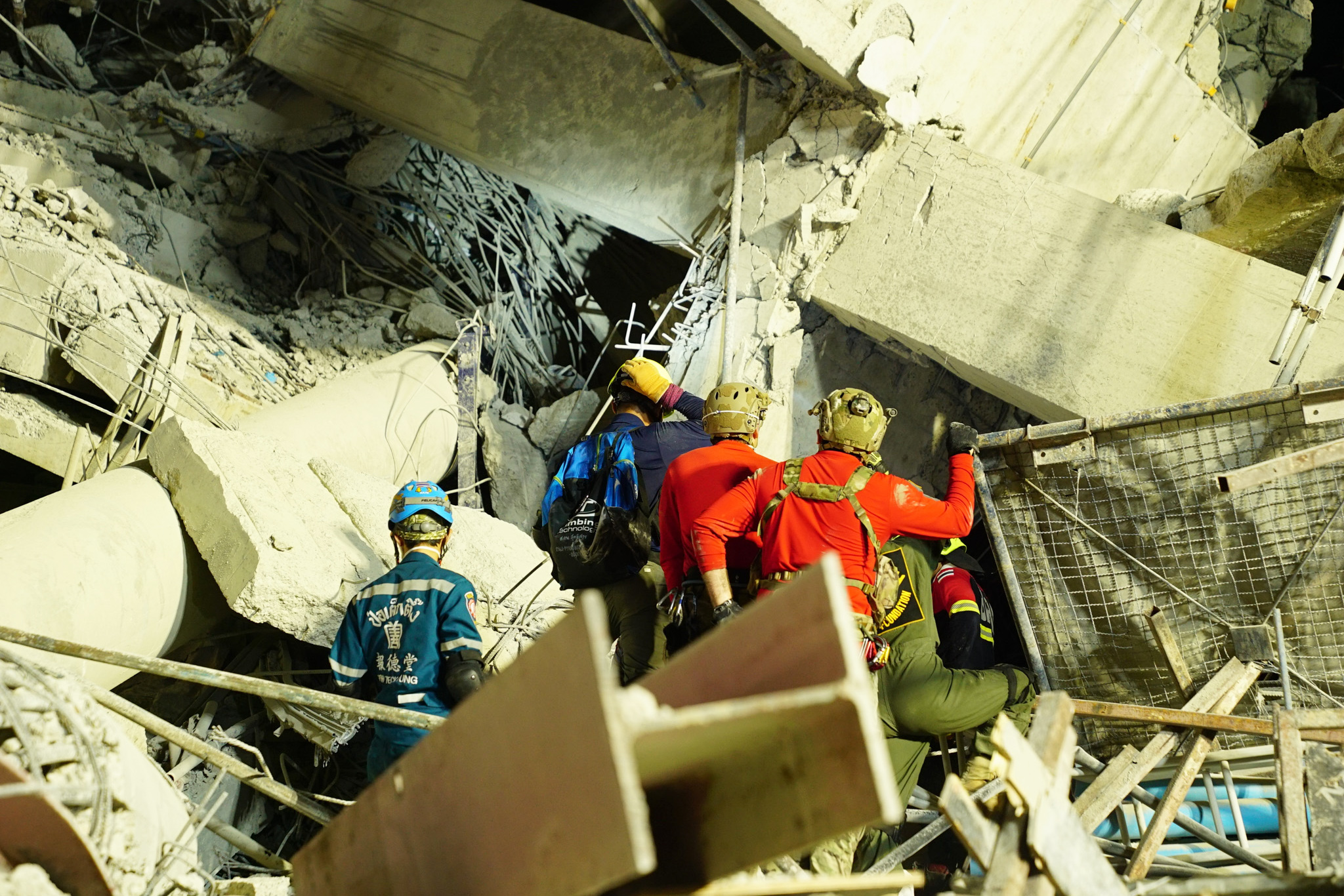
Search-and-rescue operations at the site on 28 March

Rescue workers brought in excavators to start combing the site for survivors. Excavators dredged piled-up soil and a crane was deployed to remove debris. The United States deployed personnel to assist in rescue efforts at the site. The Israeli embassy also sent a scanning device that was used to search for survivors.

Following the earthquake, Thai Prime Minister Paetongtarn Shinawatra visited the site of the collapse on the evening of 28 March. On 2 April, she visited the site again and met with relatives of the collapse victims. On 4 April, Bangkok's Governor, Chadchart Sittipunt, apologised for delays in rescue efforts. The Ministry of Labour announced that it would provide up to two million baht in compensation for relatives of each those who died in the collapse and cover the treatment of those injured. By 27 April, 38 million baht had been released by the ministry. On 31 March, a man was arrested for falsely claiming that his wife was trapped in the building.

By 6 May 2025, search-and-rescue operations had shifted to the lower portions of the building, where authorities expressed hope that "the ongoing search could yield more discoveries". Rescue operations ended on 13 May with 89 confirmed dead and seven others missing. By 14 May, 95 were confirmed dead and nine injuries, while another worker remained unaccounted for as of 14 May 2025. The casualty numbers were finalized at 96 dead and 9 injured by March 2026.

== Victims ==
96 people died in the collapse, while nine others were injured. Of the dead, 93 were identified and 315 body parts were recovered. The dead include migrant workers from Myanmar and a Cambodian national. The total of foreign nationals killed was 22.

== Investigation ==
On 28 March 2025, Paetongtarn ordered the formation of a committee of experts to investigate the collapse within a week. On 2 April, she visited the site again and met with relatives of the collapse victims. Investigators focused on whether "the construction quality, materials used, and whether building codes for earthquake resilience were adequately followed." On 30 March, Industry Minister Akanat Promphan said at an on-site news conference that "anomalies" had been found in the steel and samples taken.

Four Chinese employees linked to a contractor were apprehended after entering the restricted Chatuchak disaster site without permission and removing 32 documents related to the construction project. They were stopped by police while attempting to leave the area, and the files were confiscated. Authorities launched legal action and an investigation into the incident, citing concerns over unauthorized access and the possible significance of the retrieved documents to the collapse probe.

Thailand's Ministry of Industry initially said that one of the steel bars used in the collapsed building was substandard and came from a Chinese company, Xin Ke Yuan Steel, in Thailand. The company providing it had been ordered to close since December 2024. However, in June 2025, the Thai government said that the quality of the steel, concrete, and other construction materials met required standards, and attributed the collapse to poor design and construction deficiencies of the elevator and stairwell walls, which were meant to absorb shear force and failed to do so.

On 19 April 2025, Police Colonel Tawee Sodsong announced that a Chinese national representing China Railway No. 10 had been arrested, while arrest warrants were issued for three Thai company shareholders over the collapse. The arrested Chinese individual was identified as Zhang Chuanling, a Chinese executive and director of the joint venture. On 15 May, the Criminal Court issued arrest warrants for 17 individuals over the collapse, including former Italian-Thai Development president Premchai Karnasuta, who surrendered to the police along with 14 other suspects in Bangkok. He denied the charges.

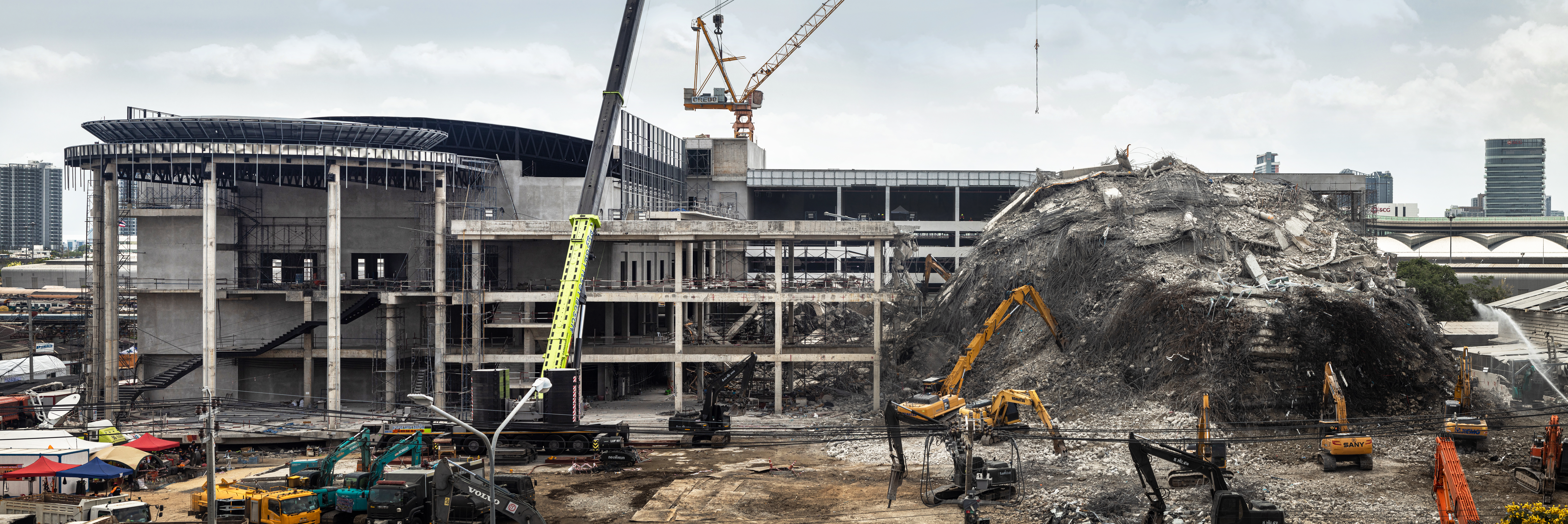
A panorama of the skyscraper site on 5 April

== Aftermath ==
The collapse prompted scrutiny of construction materials linked to Xin Ke Yuan Steel, which had supplied steel bars to the State Audit Office building. The company’s products were also identified in a separate structural failure in Phan Thong, Chonburi. On 16 May 2025, part of a factory building in the Amata City Chonburi Industrial Estate collapsed, injuring one woman and damaging seven nearby vehicles. Investigators reported that 20 mm deformed steel bars and 9 mm round steel rods manufactured by Xin Ke Yuan Steel were found in the debris. The factory, operated by Cosmo Manufacturing (Thailand) Ltd, had leased the building since 2022. Following the incident, Thailand's Ministry of Industry ordered an urgent investigation, while the Industrial Estate Authority of Thailand temporarily suspended operations at the site and mandated a full structural assessment.

In August 2025, ITD former president Premchai Karnasuta, CREC No. 10 local director Zhang Chuanling, and 21 others were charged in August for gross negligence and manslaughter. The Sikhio train disaster which occurred on 14 January 2026 brought scrutiny back towards ITD and CREC No.10, as the accident involved the construction site of both companies. As of the time of the Sikhio disaster, the case was still pending and the contract for the now-collapsed building had yet to be cancelled. As a result of this, as well as the Rama II Road crane collapse which occurred a day after the Sikhio disaster, Thai Prime Minister Anutin Charnvirakul ordered the cancellation of several ITD contracts, including the now-collapsed building.

In China, online discussion on the collapse of the building was censored in the same way as commentary on other tofu-dreg projects.

== See also ==
- Tofu-dreg project
- 2025 Myanmar earthquake
- List of populated places affected by the 2025 Myanmar earthquake
- Dao Khanong Expressway Bridge collapse
- Novi Sad railway station canopy collapse
- Sikhio train disaster
