= Pang Puai railway station =

Railway station in Thailand

Coordinates: 18.2986°N 99.8568°E

Pang Puai ปางป๋วย
- Station in 2026

General information
- Location: Ban Pang Puai, Na Sak Subdistrict, Mae Mo District, Lampang
- Owner: State Railway of Thailand
- Line: Northern Line
- Platforms: 1
- Tracks: 3

Other information
- Station code: ปย.

Services
Preceding station	State Railway of Thailand	Following station
Pha Kho Halt towards Hua Lamphong or Krung Thep Aphiwat	Northern Line	Mae Chang towards Chiang Mai
Location

Pang Puai railway station is a railway station located in Na Sak Subdistrict, Mae Mo District, Lampang. It is located 591.079 km from Bangkok railway station and is a class 3 railway station. It is on the Northern Line of the State Railway of Thailand.

== 1989 Derailment ==
On 23 May 1989, 20:30 The Rapid Train no. 38 (Chiang Mai-Bangkok) crashed into the face of a mountain and derailed. The crash occurred between Pang Puai and Pha Khan railway stations. The train operator was instantly killed and the mechanic and train conductor received minor injuries. All eight carriages fell into the adjacent valley, causing eight deaths, 32 serious injuries and 107 minor injuries. After inspection, the cause was identified as due to a braking system failure. The system was fixed at Nakhon Lampang station, but failed again near Mae Mo station. At the site of the derailment, it was reported the speed was at 75 km/h when the speed limit was 45 km/h and the crash occurred following the application of an emergency brake.

== Gallery ==
Station building

Signalling room, separated from the station building.

1989 derailment memorial and shrine at the site of the crash (5 kilometers south of Pang Puai)
