= Wat Khuan Phayer railway halt =

Railway halt in Don Pradu, Thailand

Wat Khuan Phayer วัดควนเผยอ

General information
- Location: Mu 1 (Ban Khuan Phayer), Don Pradu Subdistrict, Pak Phayun District, Phatthalung
- Coordinates: 7.2596°N 100.2993°E
- Owner: State Railway of Thailand
- Line: Southern Line
- Platforms: 1
- Tracks: 1

Other information
- Station code: วผ.

Services
| Preceding station | State Railway of Thailand | Following station |
|---|---|---|
| Han Thao towards Hua Lamphong or Krung Thep Aphiwat | Southern Line | Khok Sai towards Su-ngai Kolok |
Location

Wat Khuan Phayer Railway Halt is a railway halt located in Don Pradu Subdistrict, Pak Phayun District, Phatthalung. It is located 893.490 km (555.2 mi) from Thon Buri Railway Station.

== Train services ==
- Local No. 445/446 Chumphon-Hat Yai Junction-Chumphon
- Local No. 447/448 Surat Thani-Sungai Kolok-Surat Thani
- Local No. 463/464 Phatthalung-Sungai Kolok-Phatthalung
