= Khuan Niang railway station =

Railway station in Rattaphum, Thailand

Khuan Niang ควนเนียง

General information
- Location: Yontrakan Kamthorn Road, Rattaphum Subdistrict, Khuan Niang District, Songkhla
- Coordinates: 7.1923°N 100.3505°E
- Owner: State Railway of Thailand
- Line: Southern Line
- Platforms: 1
- Tracks: 3

Other information
- Station code: เน.

Services
Preceding station	State Railway of Thailand	Following station
Khok Sai towards Hua Lamphong or Krung Thep Aphiwat	Southern Line	Ban Ko Yai towards Su-ngai Kolok
Location

Khuan Niang railway station is a railway station located in Rattaphum Subdistrict, Khuan Niang District, Songkhla. It is a class 2 railway station located 902.974 km (561.1 mi) from Thon Buri railway station

== Services ==
- Rapid No. 169/170 Bangkok-Yala-Bangkok
- Local No. 445/446 Chumphon-Hat Yai Junction-Chumphon
- Local No. 447/448 Surat Thani-Sungai Kolok-Surat Thani
- Local No. 451/452 Nakhon Si Thammarat-Sungai Kolok-Nakhon Si Thammarat
- Local No. 455/456 Nakhon Si Thammarat-Yala-Nakhon Si Thammarat
- Local No. 463/464 Phatthalung-Sungai Kolok-Phatthalung
