= Ban Ton Don railway station =

Railway station in Khuan Khanun, Thailand

Ban Ton Don บ้านต้นโดน

General information
- Location: Khuan Khanun Subdistrict, Khao Chaison District, Phatthalung
- Coordinates: 7.5311°N 100.1095°E
- Owner: State Railway of Thailand
- Line: Southern Line
- Platforms: 1
- Tracks: 2

Other information
- Station code: บโ.

History
- Former names: Ban Khuan Yang

Services
Preceding station	State Railway of Thailand	Following station
Ban Khai Thai Halt towards Hua Lamphong or Krung Thep Aphiwat	Southern Line	Ban Huai Taen Halt towards Su-ngai Kolok
Location

Ban Ton Don station (Thai: สถานีบ้านต้นโดน) is a railway station located in Khuan Khanun Subdistrict, Khao Chaison District, Phatthalung, Thailand. It is a class 3 railway station located 856.15 km (532.0 mi) from Thon Buri railway station.

== Train services ==
- Local No. 445/446 Chumphon-Hat Yai Junction-Chumphon
- Local No. 447/448 Surat Thani-Sungai Kolok-Surat Thani
- Local No. 451/452 Nakhon Si Thammarat-Sungai Kolok-Nakhon Si Thammarat
- Local No. 455/456 Nakhon Si Thammarat-Yala-Nakhon Si Thammarat
- Local No. 463/464 Phatthalung-Sungai Kolok-Phatthalung
