= Mae Chang railway station =

Railway station in Thailand

Coordinates: 18.2725°N 99.7863°E

Mae Chang แม่จาง
- Station in 2026

General information
- Location: Ban Sop Toen, Na Sak Subdistrict, Mae Mo District, Lampang
- Owner: State Railway of Thailand
- Line: Northern Line
- Platforms: 1
- Tracks: 3

Other information
- Station code: มจ.

Services
| Preceding station | State Railway of Thailand | Following station |
|---|---|---|
| Pang Puai towards Hua Lamphong or Krung Thep Aphiwat | Northern Line | Mae Mo towards Chiang Mai |
Location

Mae Chang railway station is a railway station located in Na Sak Subdistrict, Mae Mo District, Lampang. It is located 600.336 km from Bangkok railway station and is a class 3 railway station. It is on the Northern Line of the State Railway of Thailand.

== Gallery ==
Station building
