= Khuan Khiam railway station =

Railway station in Falami, Thailand

Khuan Khiam ควนเคี่ยม

General information
- Location: Mu 9 (Ban Khuan Khiam), Falami Subdistrict, Pak Phayun District, Phatthalung
- Coordinates: 7.3473°N 100.2311°E
- Owner: State Railway of Thailand
- Line: Southern Line
- Platforms: 1
- Tracks: 2

Other information
- Station code: คเ.

Services
Preceding station	State Railway of Thailand	Following station
Khuan Phra Halt towards Hua Lamphong or Krung Thep Aphiwat	Southern Line	Han Kong Halt towards Su-ngai Kolok
Location

Khuan Khiam railway station is a railway station located in Falami Subdistrict, Pak Phayun District, Phatthalung. It is a class 3 railway station located 881.152 km (547.5 mi) from Thon Buri railway station

== Train services ==
- Local No. 445/446 Chumphon-Hat Yai Junction-Chumphon
- Local No. 447/448 Surat Thani-Sungai Kolok-Surat Thani
- Local No. 451/452 Nakhon Si Thammarat-Sungai Kolok-Nakhon Si Thammarat
- Local No. 455/456 Nakhon Si Thammarat-Yala-Nakhon Si Thammarat
- Local No. 463/464 Phatthalung-Sungai Kolok-Phatthalung
