= Khao Chaison railway station =

Railway station in Khao Chaison, Thailand

Khao Chaison เขาชัยสน

General information
- Location: Khao Chaison Subdistrict, Khao Chaison District, Phatthalung
- Coordinates: 7.4598°N 100.1403°E
- Owner: State Railway of Thailand
- Line: Southern Line
- Platforms: 1
- Tracks: 2

Other information
- Station code: เช.

Services
Preceding station	State Railway of Thailand	Following station
Ban Huai Taen Halt towards Hua Lamphong or Krung Thep Aphiwat	Southern Line	Bang Kaeo towards Su-ngai Kolok
Location

Khao Chaison railway station is a railway station located in Khao Chaison Subdistrict, Khao Chaison District, Phatthalung, Thailand. It is a class 2 railway station located 865.018 km (537.5 mi) from Thon Buri railway station.
