= Han Kong railway halt =

Railway station in Falami, Thailand

Han Kong หารกง

General information
- Location: National Highway No.4049, Falami Subdistrict, Pak Phayun District, Phatthalung
- Coordinates: 7.3158°N 100.2521°E
- Owner: State Railway of Thailand
- Line: Southern Line
- Platforms: 1
- Tracks: 1

Other information
- Station code: ฮก.

Services
Preceding station	State Railway of Thailand	Following station
Khuan Khiam towards Hua Lamphong or Krung Thep Aphiwat	Southern Line	Han Thao towards Su-ngai Kolok
Location

Han Kong Railway Halt is a railway halt located in Falami Subdistrict, Pak Phayun District, Phatthalung. It is located 885.35 km (550.1 mi) from Thon Buri Railway Station

== Train services ==
- Local No. 445/446 Chumphon-Hat Yai Junction-Chumphon
- Local No. 448 Sungai Kolok-Surat Thani
- Local No. 455/456 Nakhon Si Thammarat-Yala-Nakhon Si Thammarat
- Local No. 463/464 Phatthalung-Sungai Kolok-Phatthalung
