= Ban Huai Taen railway halt =

Railway station in Han Pho, Thailand

Ban Huai Taen บ้านห้วยแตน

General information
- Location: Ban Huai Taen, Han Pho Subdistrict, Khao Chaison District, Phatthalung
- Coordinates: 7.5051°N 100.1163°E
- Owner: State Railway of Thailand
- Line: Southern Line
- Platforms: 1
- Tracks: 1

Other information
- Station code: ยแ.

Services
Preceding station	State Railway of Thailand	Following station
Ban Ton Don towards Hua Lamphong or Krung Thep Aphiwat	Southern Line	Khao Chaison towards Su-ngai Kolok
Location

Ban Huai Taen Halt (Thai: ที่หยุดรถบ้านห้วยแตน) is a railway halt located in Han Pho Subdistrict, Khao Chaison District, Phatthalung. It is located 859.253 km (533.9 mi) from Thon Buri Railway Station

== Train services ==
- Local No. 445/446 Chumphon-Hat Yai Junction-Chumphon
- Local No. 448 Sungai Kolok-Surat Thani
- Local No. 451/452 Nakhon Si Thammarat-Sungai Kolok-Nakhon Si Thammarat
- Local No. 455/456 Nakhon Si Thammarat-Yala-Nakhon Si Thammarat
- Local No. 463/464 Phatthalung-Sungai Kolok-Phatthalung
