= Khuan Phra railway halt =

Railway station in Don Sai, Thailand

Khuan Phra ควนพระ

General information
- Location: Mu 2 (Ban Khuan Phra), Don Sai Subdistrict, Pak Phayun District, Phatthalung
- Owner: State Railway of Thailand
- Line: Southern Line
- Platforms: 1
- Tracks: 1

Other information
- Station code: คะ.

Services
Preceding station	State Railway of Thailand	Following station
Bang Kaeo towards Hua Lamphong or Krung Thep Aphiwat	Southern Line	Khuan Khiam towards Su-ngai Kolok
Location

Khuan Phra Railway Halt is a railway halt located in Falami Subdistrict, Pak Phayun District, Phatthalung. It is located 876.502 km (544.6 mi) from Thon Buri Railway Station

== Train services ==
- Local No. 445/446 Chumphon-Hat Yai Junction-Chumphon
- Local No. 447/448 Surat Thani-Sungai Kolok-Surat Thani
- Local No. 451/452 Nakhon Si Thammarat-Sungai Kolok-Nakhon Si Thammarat
- Local No. 455/456 Nakhon Si Thammarat-Yala-Nakhon Si Thammarat
- Local No. 463/464 Phatthalung-Sungai Kolok-Phatthalung
