= Thung Yai Naresuan Wildlife Sanctuary =

- เขตรักษาพันธุ์สัตว์ป่าทุ่งใหญ่นเรศวร
- IUCN category Ia (strict nature reserve)
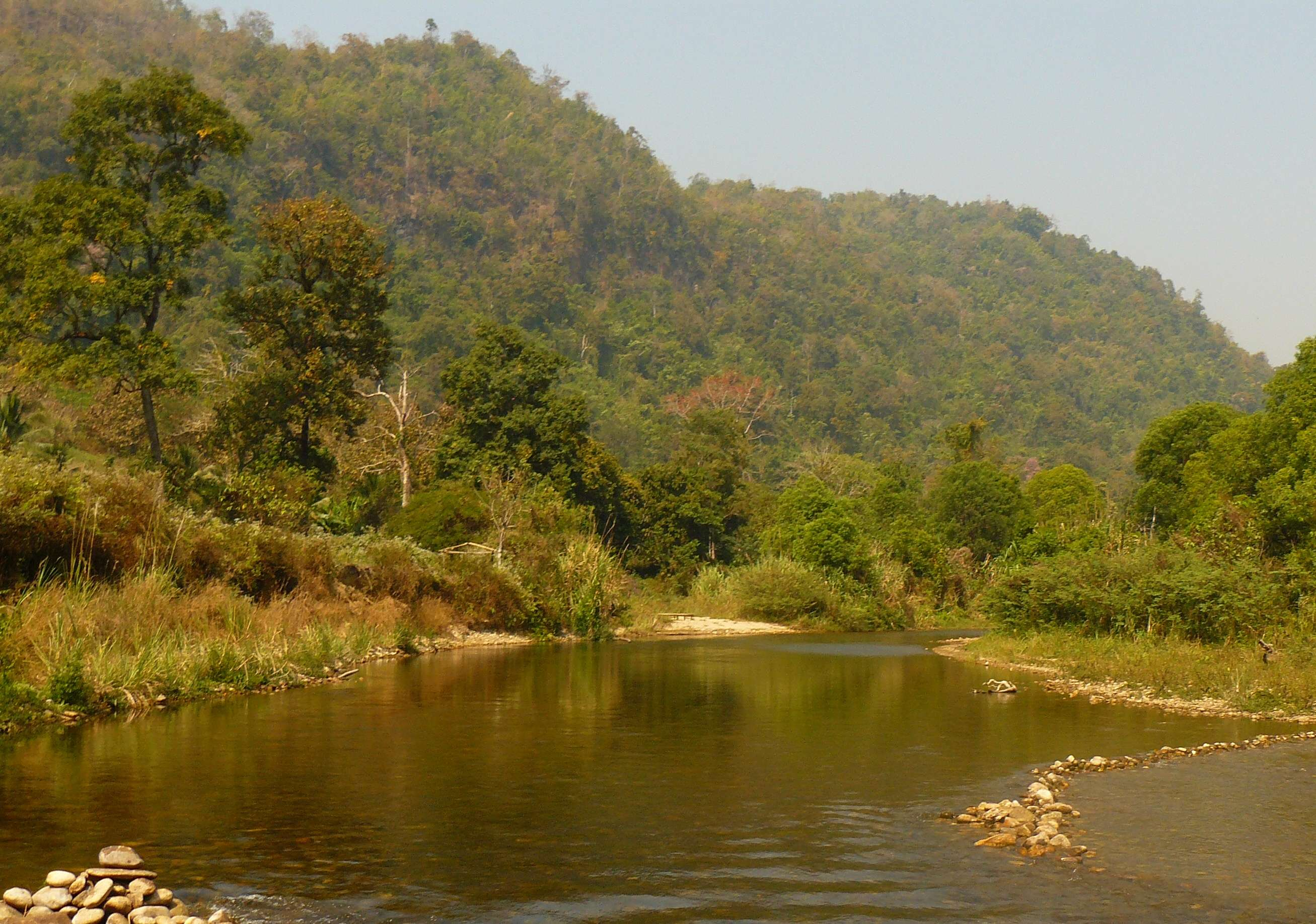
- Ramit River at the southern edge of Thung Yai Sanctuary bordering Khao Laem National Park

- Location within Thailand
- Location: Kanchanaburi and Tak Provinces
- Nearest city: Tak (town)
- Coordinates: 15°20′N 98°55′E
- Area: 3,647 km^{2} (1,408 sq mi)
- Established: 1974
- Governing body: Department of National Parks, Wildlife and Plant Conservation

UNESCO World Heritage Site
- Part of: Thungyai-Huai Kha Khaeng Wildlife Sanctuaries
- Criteria: Natural: (vii), (ix), (x)
- Reference: 591
- Inscription: 1991 (15th Session)
- Area: 364,720 ha (1,408.2 sq mi)

The Thung Yai Naresuan Wildlife Sanctuary (Thai: เขตรักษาพันธุ์สัตว์ป่าทุ่งใหญ่นเรศวร, pronounced [kʰèːt rák.sǎː pʰān sàt pàː tʰûŋ jàj nā.rēː.sǔan]) is a protected area in Thailand in the northern part of Kanchanaburi Province and the southern part of Tak Province. It was declared a wildlife sanctuary in 1972, and a World Heritage Site by UNESCO in 1991 together with the adjoining Huai Kha Khaeng Wildlife Sanctuary.

== Location and topography ==
The sanctuary is at the western national border of Thailand with Burma, in the southern area of the Dawna Range. It extends northeast of the Three Pagodas Pass from Sangkhla Buri District in Kanchanaburi Province into Umphang District in Tak Province.

The wildlife sanctuary stretches over an area of 2,279,500 rai ~ 3,647 km^{2} (1,408 sq mi), and is the largest protected area in Thailand. Together with the adjoining Huai Kha Khaeng Wildlife Sanctuary (Thai: เขตรักษาพันธุ์สัตว์ป่าห้วยขาแข้ง) it constitutes the core area of the Western Forest Complex, which represents the largest agglomeration of contiguous protected area in mainland Southeast Asia, 6,222 km^{2} (2,402 sq mi).
Management of this wildlife sanctuary is split between two protected areas regional offices: PARO 14 (Tak) manages the east part and PARO 3 (Ban Pong) manages the west part of this wildlife sanctuary.

- Thung Yai Naresuan West Wildlife Sanctuary, 1,331,062 rai ~ 2,130 km^{2} (820 sq mi)
- Thung Yai Naresuan East Wildlife Sanctuary, 948,438 rai ~ 1,517 km^{2} (586 sq mi)

The area is predominantly mountainous and composed of various limestones interspersed with massive intrusions of granite and smaller outcrops of quartzite and schist. Elevations range from about 180 metres (590 feet) at the Vajiralongkorn Reservoir in the south of the sanctuary to its highest peak, Khao Tai Pa, at 1,811 metres (5,942 feet). Major rivers are the Mae Klong and the Mae Chan which originate in the Umphang Wildlife Sanctuary and join in Thung Yai into the Upper Khwae Yai which feeds the Si Nakharin Reservoir. Various smaller rivers in the south and southwest feed the Vajiralongkorn Reservoir while in the northwestern part of the sanctuary the Mae Kasat and the Mae Suriya flow into Burma.

== Climate and rainfall ==
The climate of the region is characterised by three seasons: a hot, wet season from May to October, a cooler, dry period from November to January and a hot, dry season from February to April. Average minimum and maximum daily temperatures range from 20 to 33 °C (68 to 91 °F) in the wet season, 15 and 35 °C (59 and 95 °F) in the hot, dry season, and 10 and 29 °C (50 and 84 °F) in the cooler season. Day-time temperatures can exceed 40 °C (104 °F) in April, while nighttime temperatures of 7 °C (45 °F) are not uncommon in the cool season.

The average annual rainfall decreases from the western part of the sanctuary receiving 2,000 to 2,400 millimetres (79 to 94 inches) a year to annual rainfalls of between 1,600 and 2,000 millimetres in the eastern parts of the sanctuary. Over 80 percent of the rain is brought by the southwest monsoon from the Andaman Sea.

== Flora and habitat types ==
Phytogeographically the sanctuary lies at the interface between the terminal southern ridges of the eastern Himalayas and the equatorial forests of the Sunda Shelf. As most of the sanctuary is botanically unexplored, scientific knowledge about its rich flora is sparse.

Montane evergreen forest covers about 15 percent of the sanctuary and occur along the mountain ridges above 1,000 metres where moisture levels are high.

Seasonal or dry evergreen forests are found on about 31 percent of the area, predominantly on land lying between 800 and 1,000 metres elevation. Gallery forest occurs along permanent watercourses, where humidity is high and the soil perpetually moist. They are often categorized under dry evergreen forests, but are particularly important to the sanctuary's fauna.

Mixed deciduous forest is the most common forest type in Thung Yai, covering about 45 percent, predominantly in areas below 800 m (2,600 ft) elevation.

Dry dipterocarp forest is a formation unique to mainland Southeast Asia and is found on about one percent of the area.

Savanna forest and grassland covers about four percent, predominantly in the thung yai or "big field" covering about 140 km^{2} at the centre of the sanctuary. The remaining 4% of the area are categorized as secondary forests, fallow areas, and swidden fields in the nomination for the World Heritage Site, but include also various Bamboo forests which are not included in this classification.

== Fauna ==
Like the flora, the fauna of Thung Yai provides a specific mix of species with Sundaic, Indo-Chinese, Indo-Burmese and Sino-Himalayan affinities due to the sanctuary's particular biogeographic location. The savanna forest of Thung Yai is the most complete and secure example of Southeast Asia's dry tropical forest.

Among the mammal species living in Thung Yai are lar gibbon (Hylobates lar), various species of macaque (Macaca) and lutung (Trachypithecus), Indochinese tiger (Panthera tigris tigris), Indochinese leopard (Panthera pardus delacouri), clouded leopard (Neofelis nebulosa), sun bear (Helarctos malayanus) and Asian black bear (Ursus thibetanus), Malayan tapir (Tapirus indicus), Indian elephant (Elephas maximus indicus), gaur (Bos gaurus), hog deer (Cervus porcinus), sambar (Rusa unicolor), Fea's muntjac (Muntiacus feae) and Sumatran serow (Capricornis sumatraensis) as well as many bat species probably including Kitti's hog-nosed bat (Craseonycteris thonglongyai). Thung Yai is part of the Western Forest Complex, which is the largest tiger habitat in the Southeast Asia region, with around 200 of the animals living there. The area is known as a natural breeding area for tigers in Thailand and Myanmar as well.

Banteng (Bos javanicus) and wild water buffalo (Bubalus amee) are known to occur in the adjoining Huai Kha Khaeng Wildlife Sanctuary and may exist in Thung Yai too. Indications for the occurrence of Vietnamese Javan rhinoceros (Rhinoceros sondaicus annamiticus) and northern Sumatran rhinoceros (Dicerorhinus sumatrensis lasiotis) in the area are recorded from the 1980s, but have not been confirmed since then.

Bird species sighted in Thung Yai include white-winged wood duck (Cairina scutulata), kalij pheasant (Lophura leucomelanos), grey peacock-pheasant (Polyplectron bicalcaratum), green peafowl (Pavo muticus), spot-billed pelican (Pelecanus philippensis), Oriental darter (Anhinga melanogaster), painted stork (Mycteria leucocephala), greater adjutant (Leptoptilos dubius), red-headed vulture (Sarcogyps calvus), mountain hawk-eagle (Nisaetus nipalensis), lesser fish eagle (Ichthyophaga humilis) and all six species of hornbill (Bucerotidae) living in mainland Southeast Asia.

The nomination for the two wildlife sanctuaries, Thung Yai Naresuan and Huai Kha Khaeng, to become World Heritage Sites lists some 120 species of mammal, 400 birds, 96 reptiles, 43 amphibians, and 113 species of fish, but research on the biodiversity in the sanctuaries is sparse.

=== Poaching ===
According to the Bangkok Post, the preserve, "... has been notorious for decades as an area where rich and powerful people enjoy poaching and game hunting". In early 2018, Premchai Karnasuta, the president of the Italian-Thai Development PLC (ITD), one of Thailand's largest construction companies, was arrested in the sanctuary in possession of skinned carcasses of protected wild animals, including a black leopard, a Kalij pheasant, and a common muntjac (also known as a barking deer), as well as three rifles and ammunition. Premchai faces several charges including trespassing and poaching. He has maintained his innocence. "I didn't do it", he told local media. He has failed to explain, however, why he was in the wildlife sanctuary and how the carcasses of the freshly killed leopard and several other endangered animals ended up in his possession. If convicted, he may be incarcerated for up to 28 years. Conservationists fear that the billionaire will be let off lightly for a wildlife crime that would see an average citizen sent to prison for years.

In the most high-profile poaching case, on 29 April 1973 a military helicopter crashed in the sanctuary, killing six high-ranking police and military officers. It turned out that they were part of a group of more than 50 officers on an illegal four-day hunting trip in the preserve. The report claimed these hunters cooked and ate the animals they killed at parties. The military refused to admit wrongdoing and the event was brushed aside by the prime minister. The scandal eventually led to the 14 October uprising that ended the military government and led to a three-year period of democratic rule.

Illegal poaching by the rich and powerful is common in Thailand, said a spokesman for the Wildlife Friends Foundation. "The police, rich people and government officials do it all the time", he said. "I think it's because rich people want to show off to their friends that they have barami (Thai: บารมี, social power), that they can afford to hunt because they have so much money."

== History ==
Paleolithic, Mesolithic and Neolithic stone tools have been found in the Khwae Noi and Khwae Yai River valleys and parts of the sanctuary were inhabited by Neolithic man. For at least 700 years, the Dawna-Tenasserim region has been home to Mon and Karen people, but burial grounds in Thung Yai and Huai Kha Khaeng Wildlife Sanctuary have not been systematically researched.

The Thai name "Thung Yai Naresuan" refers to the "big field" (thung yai) or savanna in the centre of the sanctuary, and to King Naresuan, a famous Siamese ruler who supposedly based his army in the area to wage war against Burma sometime during his reign of the Ayutthaya Kingdom from 1590 until his death in 1605.

The Karen people who live in the sanctuary call the savanna pia aethala aethea which may be translated as "place of the knowing sage". It refers to the area as a place where ascetic hermits called aethea have lived and meditated and may do so even today. The Karen in Thung Yai regard them as holy men important for their history and identity in Thung Yai and revere them in a specific cult.

Historical sources as well as local oral tradition suggest that settlement of Karen people in Thung Yai did not occur before the second half of the 18th century. At that time, due to political and religious persecution in Burma, predominantly Pwo-Karen from the hinterlands of Moulmein and Tavoy migrated into the area northeast of the Three Pagodas Pass, where they received formal settlement rights from the Siamese Governor of Kanchanaburi. Sometime between 1827 and 1839 the Siamese King Rama III established this area as a principality (mueang) and the Karen leader who governed the principality received the Siamese title of nobility Phra Si Suwannakhiri. During the second half of the 19th century, this Karen principality at the Burmese border became particularly important for the Siamese King Rama V (Chulalongkorn) in his negotiations with the British colonial power in Burma regarding the demarcation of their western border with Siam.

At the beginning of the 20th century, when the modern Thai nation state was established, the Karen in Thung Yai lost their former status and importance. During the first half of the 20th century, external political influences were minimal in Thung Yai and the Karen communities were highly autonomous regarding their internal affairs. This changed in the second half of the 20th century, when the Thai nation state extended its institutions into the peripheral areas and the Karen re-appeared as chao khao or "hill tribes" on the national political agenda, as forest destroyers and illegal immigrants.

Plans to protect the forests and wildlife at the upper Khwae Yai and Khwae Noi river grew in the mid-1960s. Due to strong logging and mining interests in the area, it was not before 1972 that the Huai Kha Khaeng Wildlife Sanctuary could be established, and Thung Yai resistance was even stronger. However, in April 1973 a military helicopter crashed near Thung Yai and revealed an illegal hunting party of senior military officers with family members, businessmen, and a film star, arousing nationwide public outrage which finally led to the fall of the Thanom-Prapas Regime after the uprising of 14 October 1973. After this accident and under a new democratic government, the area finally could be declared a wildlife sanctuary in 1974. After the military had taken power once again in October 1976, many of the activists of the democracy movement fled into peripheral regions of the country and some of them found refuge among the Karen people living in Thung Yai.

During the 1960s, not only timber and ore, but also the water of the western forests as hydroelectric power resources became of interest for commercial profit and national development. A system of several big dams was planned to produce electricity for the growing urban centres. On the Khwae Yai River the Si Nakharin Dam was finished in 1980 and the Tha Thung Na Dam in 1981, while the Khao Laem Dam (renamed Vajiralongkorn Dam) on the Khwae Noi River south of Thung Yai was completed in 1984. The Nam Choan Dam, the last of the projected dams, was supposed to flood a forest area of about 223 km^{2} within the Thung Yai Naresuan Wildlife Sanctuary.

A public dispute about the Nam Choan Dam project lasted for more than six years, dominating national politics and public debate in early-1988 before it was shelved in April that year. Pointing to the high value of Thung Yai for nature conservation and biodiversity, dam opponents on the national and international level raised the possibility of declaring the area a world heritage site. This prestigious option would have been lost with a huge dam and reservoir in the middle of the two wildlife sanctuaries most promising to meet the requirements for a global heritage.

After the dam project was shelved, the proposal to UNESCO was written by Seub Nakhasathien and another outspoken opponent of the Nam Choan Dam, and, in December 1991, Thung Yai Naresuan together with the adjoining Huai Kha Khaeng Wildlife Sanctuary was declared a Natural World Heritage Site by UNESCO. In the nomination, the "outstanding universal value" of the two sanctuaries is, in first place, justified with their extraordinary high biodiversity due to their unique position at the junction of four biogeographic zones, as well as with its size and "the undisturbed nature of its habitats". The death of Seub Nakhasathien, the forest conservator instrumental in the UNESCO listing who committed suicide in 1990, transformed the status of Thung Yai Naresuan and the adjacent Huay Kha Kaeng Complex into a sacrosanct site and inspired many young persons to become forest patrol staff.

Even though the UNESCO nomination explicitly emphasizes the "undisturbed nature" of the area, and notwithstanding scientific studies supporting traditional settlement and use rights of the Karen people in Thung Yai as well as the sustainability of their traditional land use system and their strong intention to remain in their homeland and to protect it, governmental authorities regard the people living in Thung Yai as a threat to the sanctuary and pursue their resettlement.

Karen villages in Huai Kha Khaeng were removed when the sanctuary was established in 1972, and in the late-1970s the remaining communities in Huai Kha Khaeng had to leave when the Si Nakharin Dam flooded their settlement areas. During the 1980s and early-1990s, villages of the Hmong ethnic minority group were removed from the Huai Kha Khaeng and Thung Yai Naresuan Wildlife Sanctuaries. The resettlement of the remaining Karen in Thung Yai was announced in the management plan for the sanctuary, drafted in the late-1980s, as well as in the proposal for the world heritage site. But, when the Thai Royal Forest Department tried to remove them in the early-1990s, it had to reverse the resettlement scheme due to strong public criticism. Since then, the authorities have used repression, intimidation, and terror to convince the Karen to leave their homeland "voluntarily", and placed restrictions on their traditional land use system which will inevitably cause its breakdown and deprive the Karen of subsistence.

As of 2018 the sanctuary employs about 200 staff to care for more than 1.3 million rai (2,100 km^{2}; 510 thousand acres). The sanctuary is larger than the total area of Bangkok, which is 98,000 rai in size. There are 25 ranger stations inside the sanctuary. Each station is assigned three firearms, some inoperable. Sanctuary staff patrol some 12,000 km of forest paths, and another 10,000 km in the adjoining Huai Kha Khaeng sanctuary. The Thailand Development Research Institute (TDRI) calculates that each forest staffer needs to police 2,083 rai (3.333 km^{2}). In Thailand overall there are 443 protected forest zones totalling 66.3 million rai (106,100 km^{2}), or 20.68 percent of the country's total area. The government allocates a budget of around 61 baht per rai to manage them.

== Location ==
Thung Yai Naresuan East Wildlife Sanctuary in overview PARO 14 (Tak)

11) Thung Yai Naresuan East Wildlife Sanctuary in overview PARO 14 (Tak)

| | National park |
| 1 | Doi Soi Malai |
| 2 | Khun Phawo |
| 3 | Lan Sang |
| 4 | Mae Moei |
| 5 | Namtok Pha Charoen |
| 6 | Ramkhamhaeng |
| 7 | Si Satchanalai |
| 8 | Taksin Maharat |

| | Wildlife sanctuary |
| 9 | Mae Tuen |
| 10 | Tham Chao Ram |
| 11 | Thung Yai Naresuan East |
| 12 | Umphang |
| | Non-hunting area |
| 13 | Tham Chao Ram |

| | Forest park |
| 14 | Namtok Pa La Tha |
| 15 | Phra Tat Huai Luek |
| 16 | Tham Lom–Tham Wang |
| 17 | Tham Ta Kho Bi |

Thung Yai Naresuan West Wildlife Sanctuary in overview PARO 3 (Ban Pong)

12) Thung Yai West Wildlife Sanctuary in overview PARO 3 (Ban Pong)

| | National park |
| 1 | Thai Prachan |
| 2 | Chaloem Rattanakosin |
| 3 | Erawan |
| 4 | Khao Laem |
| 5 | Khuean Srinagarindra |
| 6 | Lam Khlong Ngu |
| 7 | Phu Toei |
| 8 | Sai Yok |
| 9 | Thong Pha Phum |

| | Wildlife sanctuary |
| 10 | Mae Nam Phachi |
| 11 | Salak Phra |
| 12 | Thung Yai Naresuan West |
| | Forest park |
| 22 | Phra Thaen Dong Rang |
| 23 | Phu Muang |
| 24 | Tham Khao Noi |

| | Non-hunting area |
| 13 | Bueng Kroengkawia– Nong Nam Sap |
| 14 | Bueng Chawak |
| 15 | Khao Pratap Chang |
| 16 | Phantai Norasing |
| 17 | Somdet Phra Srinagarindra |
| 18 | Tham Khang Khao– Khao Chong Phran |
| 19 | Tham Lawa– Tham Daowadueng |
| 20 | Wat Rat Sattha Kayaram |
| 21 | Wat Tham Rakhang– Khao Phra Non |

== See also ==
- Wildlife of Thailand
- Indochina
