= Ban Din Lan railway station =

Railway station in Tha Chang, Thailand

Ban Din Lan บ้านดินลาน

General information
- Location: Songkhla Local Road No. 3043, Tha Chang Subdistrict, Bang Klam District, Songkhla; Thailand
- Coordinates: 7.0476°N 100.4326°E
- Owner: State Railway of Thailand
- Line: Southern Line
- Platforms: 1
- Tracks: 2

Other information
- Station code: ดล.

Services
Preceding station	State Railway of Thailand	Following station
Bang Klam towards Hua Lamphong or Krung Thep Aphiwat	Southern Line	Hat Yai Junction towards Su-ngai Kolok
Location

Ban Din Lan station (Thai: สถานีบ้านดินลาน) is a railway station located in Tha Chang Subdistrict, Bang Klam District, Songkhla, Thailand. It is a class 3 railway station located 921.847 km (572.8 mi) from Thon Buri Railway Station

== Services ==
- Local No. 445/446 Chumphon-Hat Yai Junction-Chumphon
- Local No. 447/448 Surat Thani-Sungai Kolok-Surat Thani
- Local No. 451/452 Nakhon Si Thammarat-Sungai Kolok-Nakhon Si Thammarat
- Local No. 455/456 Nakhon Si Thammarat-Yala-Nakhon Si Thammarat
- Local No. 463/464 Phatthalung-Sungai Kolok-Phatthalung
