= Sikhio train disaster =

Deadly rail accident in Thailand

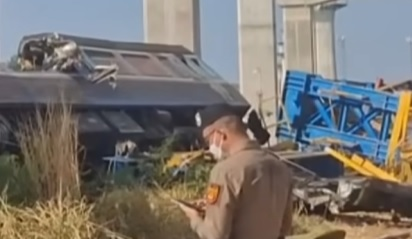
- The aftermath of the accident

Details
- Date: 14 January 2026; 09:13 ICT (UTC+07:00)
- Location: Sikhio district, Nakhon Ratchasima province
- Coordinates: 14°53′28″N 101°42′00″E
- Country: Thailand
- Line: Northeastern Line
- Operator: State Railway of Thailand
- Incident type: Crane collapse, derailment and fire
- Cause: Structural collapse and failure to halt the railway traffic

Statistics
- Trains: 1 (Train No. 21)
- Vehicles: ADR 20 railcar
- Passengers: 157
- Deaths: 30
- Injured: 69

On 14 January 2026, at 09:13 (ICT; UTC+07:00), a construction crane fell on a passenger train with 157 passengers on board in Sikhio district, Nakhon Ratchasima province, Thailand, killing 30 and injuring 69 others.

== Background ==
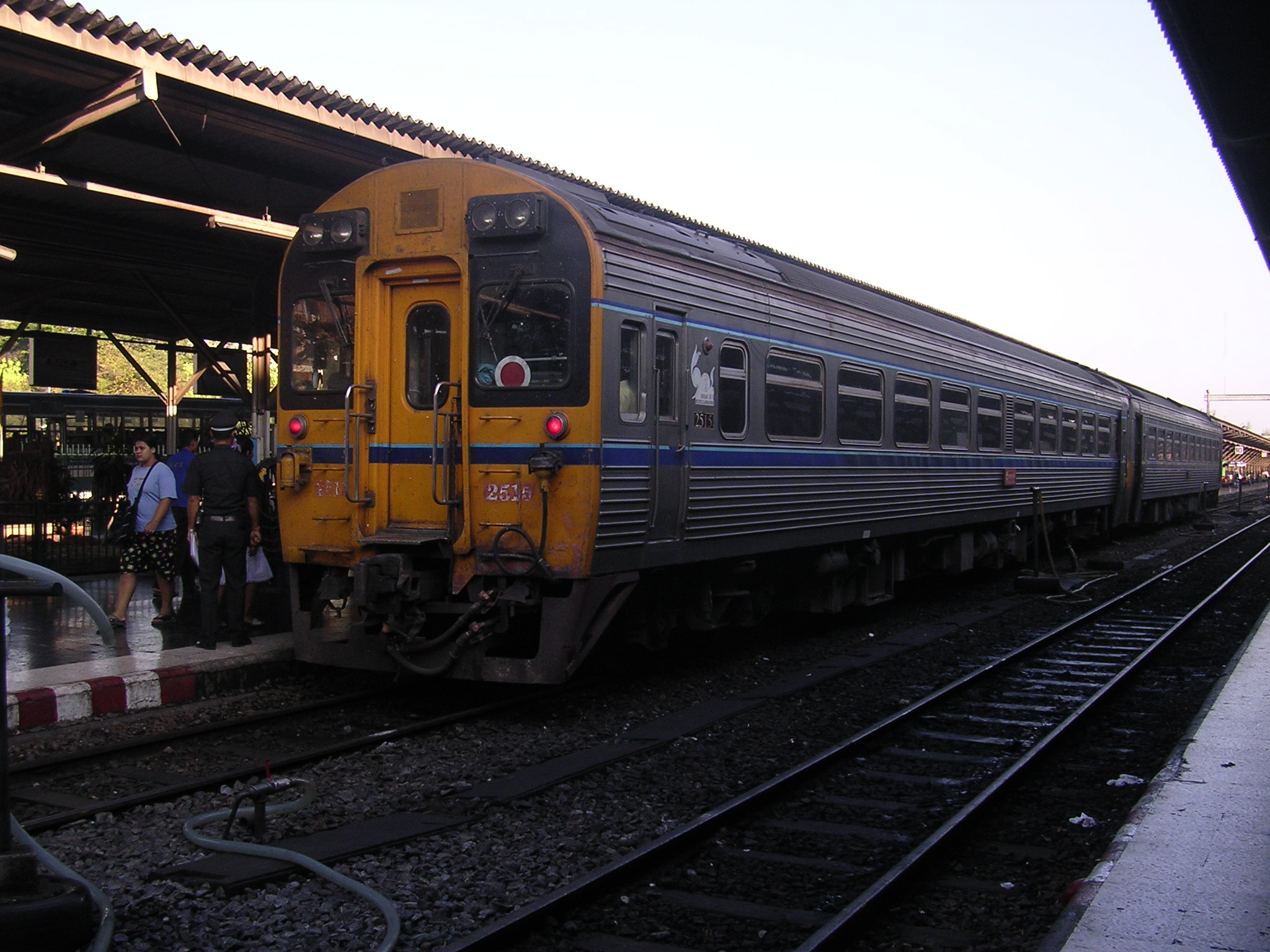
ADR 20 No. 2515, one of the railcars involved in the crash

The train involved was an express train from Krung Thep Aphiwat in Bangkok to Ubon Ratchathani. The accident took place at the construction site of the Bangkok–Nong Khai high-speed railway network under Contract 3–4 (Lam Takhong to Sikhio), associated with China's Belt and Road Initiative and awarded to a joint-venture of Italian-Thai Development (ITD) company and the China Railway Engineering Corporation No. 10 in 2020.

The section of track where the accident occurred was at the intersection of the elevated high-speed railroad platform and the preexisting railway on ground level. The intersection was created due to the minimum radius of curvature required for high-speed trains, which requires more space and causes overlap. At the time of the accident, the project was estimated to be 99% complete.

The large launching gantry crane that collapsed onto the track was being used to lift concrete segments to assemble the elevated deck for the railroad. During construction of the high-speed railway, traffic on the ground-level railway continued.

=== Previous accidents ===
Prior to the accident, one other construction project managed by the ITD-CREC No. 10 Joint Venture, as well as another managed by a different joint venture headed by ITD, suffered structural collapses in 2025: the State Audit Office building collapse on 28 March as a result of the 2025 Myanmar earthquake, and the Rama III-Dao Khanong Expressway collapse on 15 March. ITD former president Premchai Karnasuta, CREC No. 10 local director Zhang Chuanling, and 21 others were charged in August for gross negligence and manslaughter. As of the time of the accident, the case was still pending and the contract for the now-collapsed building had yet to be cancelled.

== Crash ==
The train No. 21, consisting of three carriages, left Bangkok at 06:10 ICT, departing from Krung Thep Aphiwat Central Terminal in Bangkok and travelling the Northeastern Line to Ubon Ratchathani province. A total of 208 people were on board the train on departure, though some departed along the way, leaving 157 on the train when the accident occurred.

At 09:13, at railway kilometre marker 220 between the Nong Nam Khun station and Sikhio stations in Ban Thanon Khot village, a launcher gantry lifting a concrete slab for the construction of the Bangkok–Nong Khai high-speed railway network collapsed onto the train which was passing along a preexisting line.

The last two carriages of the train were severely damaged. The crane fell along with its concrete load, leading to the derailment of the train and a fire in coach 2. The train was traveling at an estimated speed of 120 km/h (75 mph) at the time of the crash. Coach 1 (No.2528) was detached from the rest of the train after the coupler snapped, sustaining only minor damage to its windshield by small debris. However, the remaining carriages were severely damaged; coach 2 (No.2521) was struck by the support base of the crane, which weighed 20–30 tons, and sliced in half by the impact, with its front section catching fire, while coach 3 (No.2515) derailed and suffered heavy side-hull damage. Initial damages to the train were estimated at more than 100 million baht (US$3.1 million).

The driver, Theerasak Wongsungnoen, said that the impact displaced him and other passengers in coach 1, causing injuries to him and others. After recovering himself, Wongsungnoen and other bystanders helped to evacuate the passengers, but a fire in coach 2 prevented him and others from rescuing those who were trapped inside.

The crane operator, 52-year-old Sombat Simthantuk, said that before the crash occurred, he heard a sound similar to uneven concrete joints sliding. After Simthantuk ordered the workers to get down from the platform, the support leg holding the concrete slab collapsed, injuring Simthantuk and others.

== Victims ==
30 people were killed and 69 others were injured. The deaths included one German and one South Korean citizen; the latter was killed along with his Thai wife. Among the injured were seven people in critical condition, including a 1-year-old and an 85-year-old. One ITD employee was also killed.

According to the Health Department of Nakhon Ratchasima province, the majority of casualties were found in coach 2 and were either burned or crushed beyond identification. Passengers were unable to escape fires in the air-conditioned carriages due to the automatic electric doors and non-opening windows. Victims suffered head, chest, and leg injuries, including fractures and pneumothorax. On 15 January, King Vajiralongkorn and Queen Suthida provided funerary expense for the deceased victim's families, as well as accepting the injured as patients under the royal care.

Following the initial forensic result on 16 January, the Health Department of Nakhon Ratchasima province revised the official death toll from 32 to 30 due to fragmented or incomplete remains, with numbers subject to change as DNA testing was being conducted. A family of three were initially believed to be dead but were later found to have survived and returned home the next day. Another group of three were declared missing, but two were later found under hospital care, while the other was found not to have been on board the train.

== Aftermath ==
Services along the Northeastern Railway were partially suspended, while the State Railway of Thailand (SRT) rerouted other trains away from the affected segment. The SRT also halted the construction of the Contract 3–4 site to make way for the investigation. Regular operations resumed on 24 January after repairs of damaged tracks and clearing of debris from the disaster site concluded.

Prime Minister Anutin Charnvirakul ordered the blacklisting of companies involved in the disaster. Later on 14 January, ITD issued an apology statement committing to providing compensation and support for the deceased passengers' families, along with supporting a resolution of the situation. Thai police announced that a total of 1,773,000 baht from the public and private sectors would be given to each family of the deceased.

=== 2026 Rama II Road crane collapse ===
2026 Rama II Road crane collapse
- Date: 15 January 2026
- Location: Samut Sakhon, Samut Sakhon province, Thailand
- Deaths: 2
- Injuries: 2

On 15 January, a day after the accident, a crane of similar design and configuration collapsed on Rama II Road in Samut Sakhon, Samut Sakhon province, killing two and injuring two others. The collapse involved the construction site of an elevated section of Motorway No. 82, which is also led by ITD.

Upon learning about the Rama II collapse, civil engineer and politician Suchatvee Suwansawat, who was inspecting the Sikhio site at the time, called both accidents a "national embarrassment" and criticized ITD for using "substandard" cranes. He also questioned why the authorities were allowing elevated railway construction when there was still traffic below.

Later that same day, Zhang Jianwei, the Chinese ambassador to Thailand, met Thai Prime Minister Anutin Charnvirakul to express condolences and to present a humanitarian aid package worth 20 million yuan (about US$2.87 million) to the Thai government. Zhang affirmed that the Chinese government had instructed Chinese companies that worked on the high-speed railway project to cooperate with the investigation.

=== Cancellation of ITD contracts ===
On 16 January, Thai Prime Minister Anutin Charnvirakul cancelled two contracts held by ITD, citing an "unacceptable risk to public safety" in the aftermath of the two accidents, along with the previous collapse of the State Audit building. ITD were to be sued for damages. Thirteen ongoing projects being handled by ITD were also suspended by the government.

== Investigation ==
The SRT launched an investigation into the accident and filed criminal and civil lawsuits against ITD. The Department of Rail Transport ordered a review of safety protocols regarding the Bangkok–Nong Khai high-speed railway. The department later said the contractor disobeyed a safety order from the Ministry of Transport prohibiting work on the elevated structure when a train or any vehicle is passing underneath, adding that a fail-safe mechanism at the site failed to activate.

An inspection by the National Civil Engineer Association revealed that the crane was held to the platform with only two PT bars instead of the four recommended for safety, and that the PT bars were mounted horizontally instead of the usual vertical position, leading to excessive stress exerted onto the crane's structure.

On 23 January, the Ministry of Transport released its preliminary investigation report for the accident. It found that the crane collapsed due to its frontal support base losing balance during the operation. The report also found that ITD violated safety procedures by proceeding with construction despite ongoing traffic. The contract stated that work must be done only when no trains operate, and that the railway station must be notified at least one day in advance should work occurs. On the day of the accident, no communication from the site to the station was established.

== See also ==
- 2023 Taichung crane collapse
- List of rail accidents in Thailand
- List of rail accidents (2020–present)
