= Bang Kaeo railway station =

Railway station in Khok Sak, Thailand

Bang Kaeo บางแก้ว

General information
- Location: Khok Sak Subdistrict, Bang Kaeo District, Phatthalung
- Coordinates: 7.4220°N 100.1672°E
- Owner: State Railway of Thailand
- Line: Southern Line
- Platforms: 1
- Tracks: 2

Other information
- Station code: แก.

Services
Preceding station	State Railway of Thailand	Following station
Khao Chaison towards Hua Lamphong or Krung Thep Aphiwat	Southern Line	Khuan Phra Halt towards Su-ngai Kolok
Location

Bang Kaeo station (Thai: สถานีบางแก้ว) is a railway station located in Khok Sak Subdistrict, Bang Kaeo District, Phatthalung. It is a class 2 railway station located 870.176 km (540.7 mi) from Thon Buri Railway Station.

== Train services ==
- Special Express No. 37/38 Bangkok-Sungai Kolok-Bangkok
- Rapid No. 169/170 Bangkok-Yala-Bangkok
- Local No. 445/446 Chumphon-Hat Yai Junction-Chumphon
- Local No. 447/448 Surat Thani-Sungai Kolok-Surat Thani
- Local No. 451/452 Nakhon Si Thammarat-Sungai Kolok-Nakhon Si Thammarat
- Local No. 455/456 Nakhon Si Thammarat-Yala-Nakhon Si Thammarat
- Local No. 463/464 Phatthalung-Sungai Kolok-Phatthalung
