= Ban Ko Yai railway station =

Railway station in Bang Riang, Thailand

Ban Ko Yai บ้านเกาะใหญ่

General information
- Location: Bang Riang Subdistrict, Khuan Niang District, Songkhla
- Coordinates: 7.1460°N 100.3853°E
- Owner: State Railway of Thailand
- Line: Southern Line
- Platforms: 1
- Tracks: 2

Other information
- Station code: กใ.

Services
Preceding station	State Railway of Thailand	Following station
Khuan Niang towards Hua Lamphong or Krung Thep Aphiwat	Southern Line	Bang Klam towards Su-ngai Kolok
Location

Ban Ko Yai station (Thai: สถานีบ้านเกาะใหญ่) is a railway station located in Bang Riang Subdistrict, Khuan Niang District, Songkhla. It is a class 3 railway station located 909.5 km (565.1 mi) from Thon Buri railway station.

== Services ==
- Local No. 445/446 Chumphon-Hat Yai Junction-Chumphon
- Local No. 447/448 Surat Thani-Sungai Kolok-Surat Thani
- Local No. 451/452 Nakhon Si Thammarat-Sungai Kolok-Nakhon Si Thammarat
- Local No. 455/456 Nakhon Si Thammarat-Yala-Nakhon Si Thammarat
- Local No. 463/464 Phatthalung-Sungai Kolok-Phatthalung
