= Han Thao railway station =

Railway station in Han Thao, Thailand

Coordinates: 7.293611°N 100.271944°E

Han Thao หารเทา

General information
- Location: Han Thao Subdistrict, Pak Phayun District, Phatthalung
- Owner: State Railway of Thailand
- Line: Southern Line
- Platforms: 2
- Tracks: 2

Other information
- Station code: หท.

Services
Preceding station	State Railway of Thailand	Following station
Han Kong Halt towards Hua Lamphong or Krung Thep Aphiwat	Southern Line	Wat Khuan Phayer Halt towards Su-ngai Kolok
Location

Han Thao railway station is a railway station located in Han Thao Subdistrict, Pak Phayun District, Phatthalung. It is a class 3 railway station located 888.685 km (552.2 mi) from Thon Buri railway station. Han Thao Station is one of the stations where the main station building is on the passing loop.

== Train services ==
- Rapid No. 169/170 Bangkok-Yala-Bangkok
- Local No. 445/446 Chumphon-Hat Yai Junction-Chumphon
- Local No. 447/448 Surat Thani-Sungai Kolok-Surat Thani
- Local No. 451/452 Nakhon Si Thammarat-Sungai Kolok-Nakhon Si Thammarat
- Local No. 455/456 Nakhon Si Thammarat-Yala-Nakhon Si Thammarat
- Local No. 463/464 Phatthalung-Sungai Kolok-Phatthalung
