= Ban Pin railway station =

Railway station in Thailand

Coordinates: 18.0961°N 99.8669°E

Ban Pin บ้านปิน
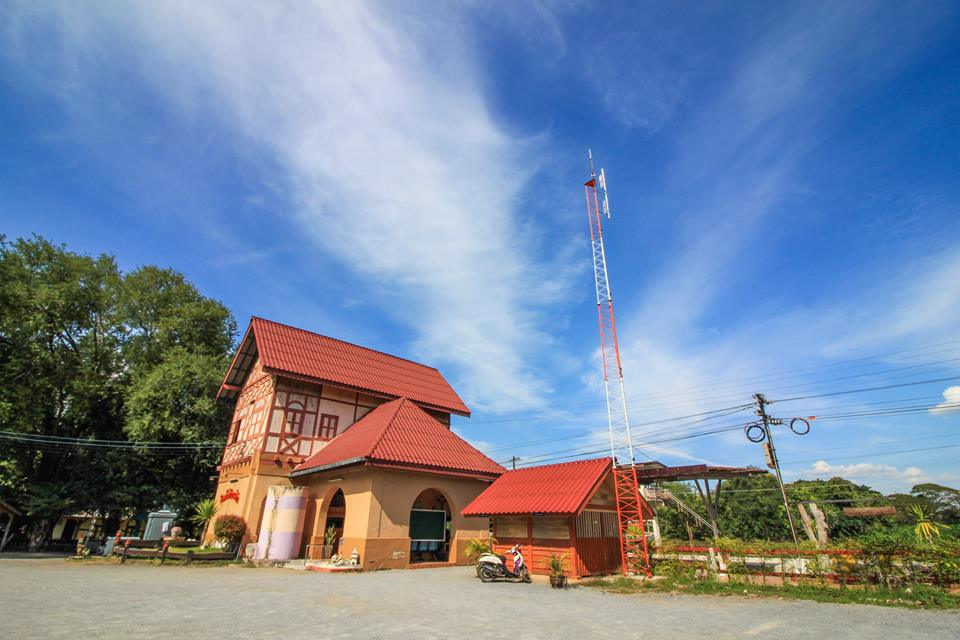
- Station building built in the Bavarian timber frame style

General information
- Location: Ban Pin Subdistrict, Long District, Phrae
- Owner: State Railway of Thailand
- Line: Northern Line
- Platforms: 2
- Tracks: 4

Other information
- Station code: บป.

History
- Opened: 15 June 1914

Services
Preceding station	State Railway of Thailand	Following station
Huai Mae Ta Halt towards Hua Lamphong or Krung Thep Aphiwat	Northern Line	Pha Khan towards Chiang Mai
Location

Ban Pin railway station is a railway station in Ban Pin Sub-district, Long District, Phrae Province, Thailand. It is a class 2 railway station 563.865 km from Bangkok railway station. It is on the Northern Line of the State Railway of Thailand. The station opened in June 1914, following the Northern Line extension from Huai Mae Ta to Ban Pin. The line continued to Pha Khan in 1915.

The station's design and construction is that of a Bavarian timber frame building, a product of the German engineers who worked on building the Northern Line. It is the only railway station in Thailand in the Bavarian style.
