= Bang Klam railway station =

Railway station in Bang Klam, Thailand

Bang Klam บางกล่ำ

General information
- Location: National Highway No. 4208, Bang Klam Subdistrict, Bang Klam District, Songkhla
- Coordinates: 7.0876°N 100.4156°E
- Owner: State Railway of Thailand
- Line: Southern Line
- Platforms: 1
- Tracks: 2

Other information
- Station code: บล.

Services
Preceding station	State Railway of Thailand	Following station
Ban Ko Yai towards Hua Lamphong or Krung Thep Aphiwat	Southern Line	Ban Din Lan towards Su-ngai Kolok
Location

Bang Klam station (Thai: สถานีบางกล่ำ) is a railway station located in Bang Klam Subdistrict, Bang Klam District, Songkhla. It is a class 3 railway station located 917.024 km (569.8 mi) from Thon Buri Railway Station.

== Services ==
- Local No. 445/446 Chumphon-Hat Yai Junction-Chumphon
- Local No. 447/448 Surat Thani-Sungai Kolok-Surat Thani
- Local No. 451/452 Nakhon Si Thammarat-Sungai Kolok-Nakhon Si Thammarat
- Local No. 455/456 Nakhon Si Thammarat-Yala-Nakhon Si Thammarat
- Local No. 463/464 Phatthalung-Sungai Kolok-Phatthalung
