= Mae Mo railway station =

Railway station in Thailand

Coordinates: 18.2613°N 99.7070°E

Mae Mo แม่เมาะ
- Station in 2026

General information
- Location: Ban Sop Mo, Sop Pat Subdistrict, Mae Mo District, Lampang
- Owner: State Railway of Thailand
- Line: Northern Line
- Platforms: 2
- Tracks: 3

Other information
- Station code: มม.

History
- Opened: 1 April 1916

Services
Preceding station	State Railway of Thailand	Following station
Mae Chang towards Hua Lamphong or Krung Thep Aphiwat	Northern Line	Huai Rak Mai Halt towards Chiang Mai
Location

Mae Mo railway station is a railway station located in Sop Pat Subdistrict, Mae Mo District, Lampang. It is located 609.168 km from Bangkok railway station and is a class 2 railway station. It is on the Northern Line of the State Railway of Thailand. A freight line once operated to the nearby coalmines but was ceased operations in 1989. The station opened in April 1916 following the opening of the Northern Line Mae Chang-Nakhon Lampang section.

== Gallery ==
Station building
