= Pha Khan railway station =

Railway station in Thailand

Coordinates: 18.2073°N 99.8708°E

Pha Khan ผาคัน
- Station in 2026

General information
- Location: Mu 10 (Ban Pha Khan), Ban Pin Subdistrict, Long District, Phrae
- Owner: State Railway of Thailand
- Line: Northern Line
- Platforms: 2
- Tracks: 3

Other information
- Station code: ผน.

Services
| Preceding station | State Railway of Thailand | Following station |
|---|---|---|
| Ban Pin towards Hua Lamphong or Krung Thep Aphiwat | Northern Line | Pha Kho Halt towards Chiang Mai |
Location

Pha Khan railway station is a railway station located in Ban Pin Subdistrict, Long District, Phrae. It is located 578.464 km from Bangkok railway station and is a class 3 railway station. It is on the Northern Line of the State Railway of Thailand.

== Gallery ==
Station building

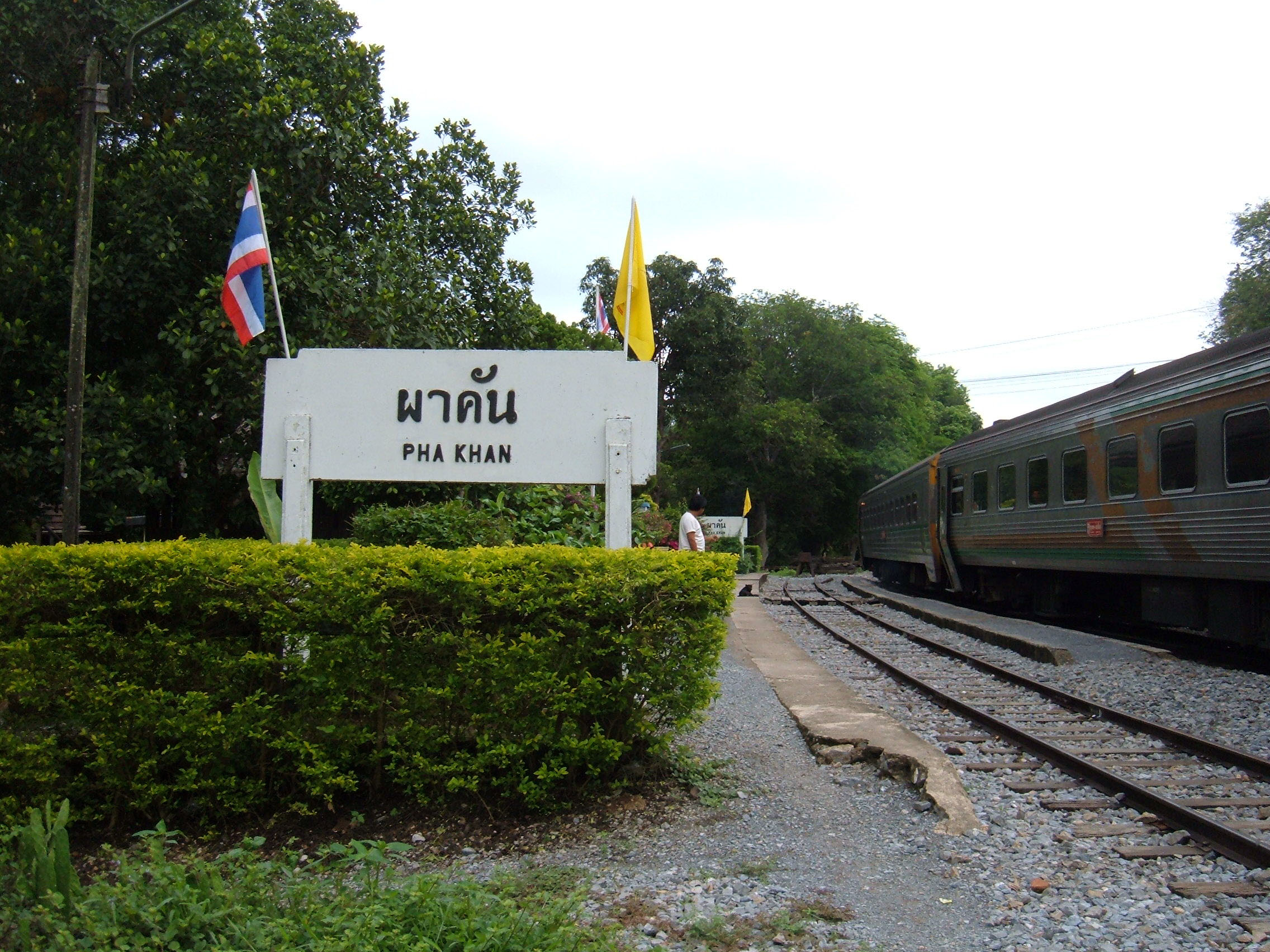
Main station platform with refuge siding in front.
