= 2026 Bangkok train collision =

Level crossing accident in Bangkok, Thailand

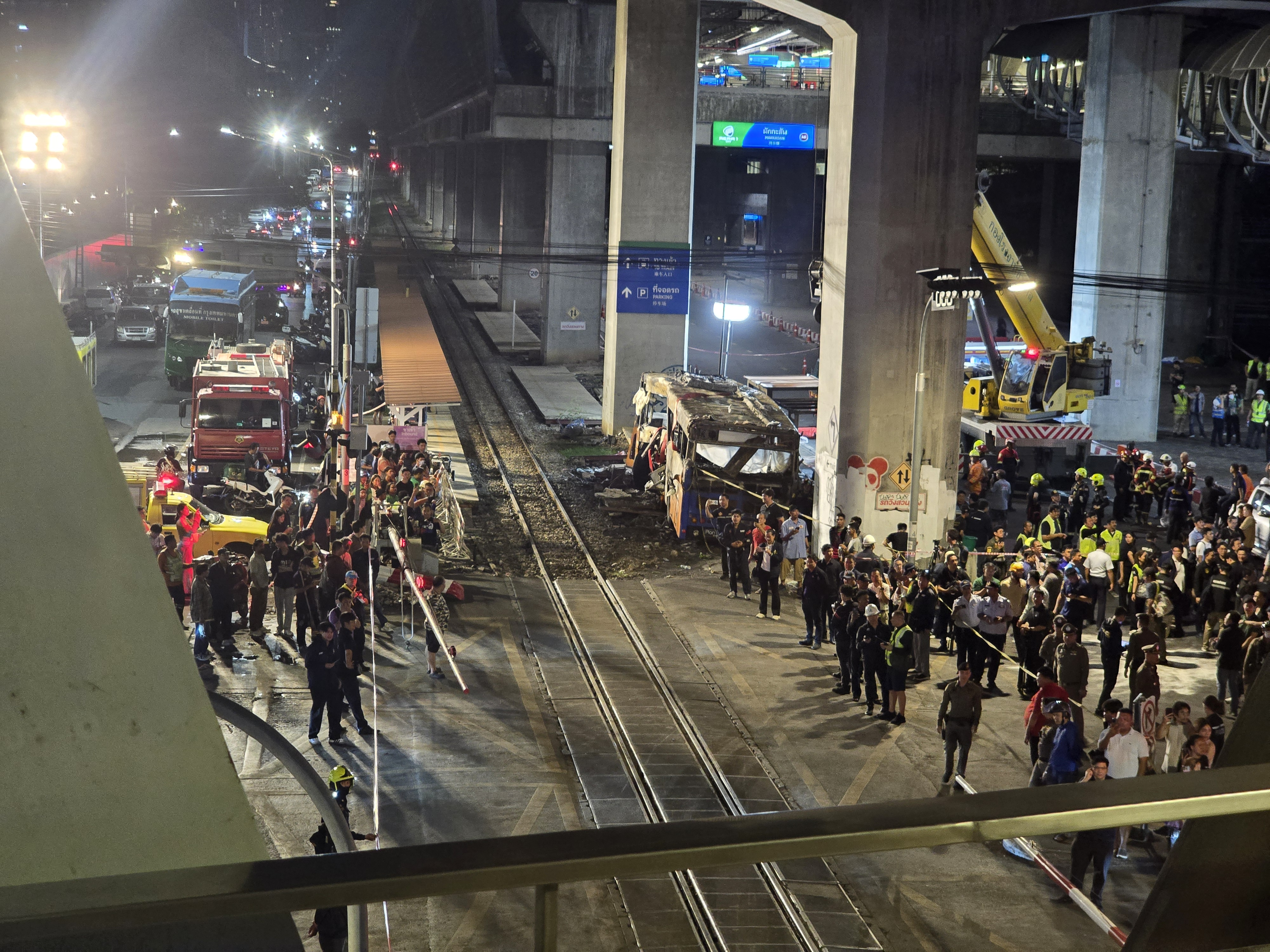
- A picture of the scene after the collision

Details
- Date: 16 May 2026; 16:35 ICT (UTC+07:00)
- Location: Makkasan, Ratchathewi, Bangkok
- Coordinates: 13°45′00.6″N 100°33′48.4″E
- Country: Thailand
- Line: Eastern Line
- Operator: State Railway of Thailand; Bangkok Mass Transit Authority
- Incident type: Level crossing accident, collision
- Cause: Automatic crossing barriers malfunction and toxicated driver (suspected)

Statistics
- Vehicles: 10
- Passengers: 0
- Deaths: 8
- Injured: 33

On 16 May 2026, a heavy freight train collided with a bus and several other vehicles at a level crossing near Makkasan station in Bangkok, Thailand, causing a massive fire and several explosions. Eight people were killed, while 33 others were injured.

== Collision ==
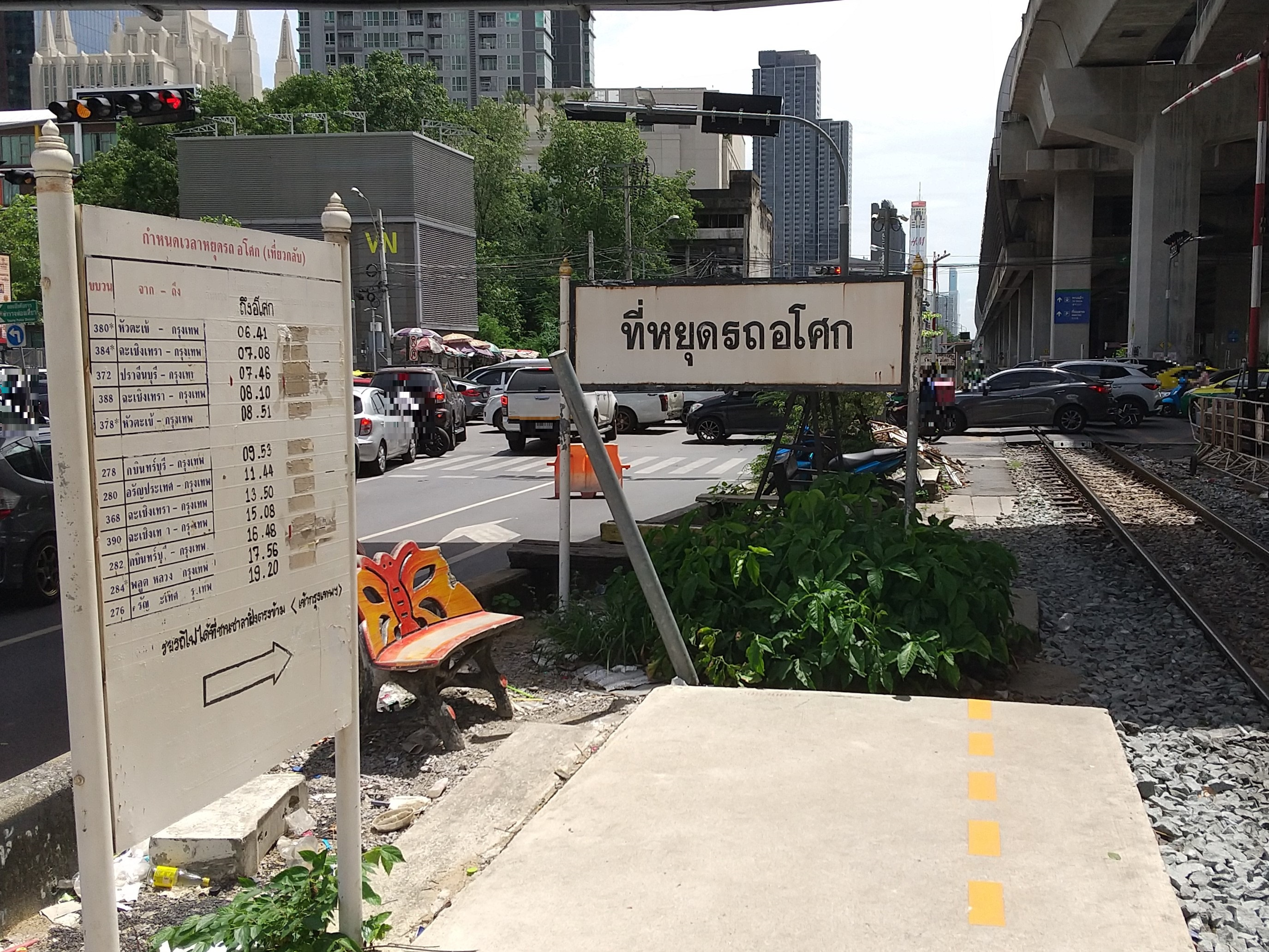
The Asok train stop sign in 2023, with the level crossing in the background

The train, Train No. 2126, was travelling from Laem Chabang to Bang Sue Junction railway station when it collided with a BMTA Route 206 passenger bus and a motorcycle at a level crossing on Asok-Din Daeng Road near the Bangkok Airport Rail Link's Makkasan station, immediately triggering a massive fire and throwing several motorcycles and their riders onto the road. The bus had stopped on the tracks while waiting at a red light amid heavy traffic, preventing the crossing barriers from closing. After the collision, the bus was fully engulfed in minutes, causing explosions when fire reached the fuel tank. The train pushed the wreckage along the tracks for about 50 metres (160 ft), striking several nearby cars and motorcycles, causing the fire to spread rapidly to adjacent vehicles. A video from the scene showed the train heavily charred by fire. The fire was extinguished in less than an hour. Six motorcycles, a car, a pickup truck and the bus were struck by the train. The number of occupants on board the bus is unknown, however, all occupants were recovered.

== Victims ==
Eight people were killed and 33 others were injured, including two in critical condition. Some sources claim 35 people were injured. The injured victims were transported to various hospitals, including six at the Camillian Hospital. 15 injured people were discharged a day after the collision. The Prime Minister of Thailand, Anutin Charnvirakul, instructed relevant agencies to care for the injured and support the families of the deceased. All eight of the fatalities were on the bus. The bodies of the deceased victims were burnt beyond recognition. Body parts were also found near the front of the train's cargo container. It is unclear if it is from someone on the bus. Forensic officers expect to confirm the identities of all deceased victims by 19 May. By 17 May, authorities identified two victims as 34-year-old Teekha Teekha-Utmakorn and 57-year-old Tiam Phuangyod of Ban Kratai Don, Sisaket Province. Eight bodies and three additional remains were sent to the Institute of Forensic Medicine.

One of the passengers on the bus, a 66 year old named Aiyang from Samut Prakan, was captured on CCTV the moment the train hit the bus. She was on the phone with her niece, Sirilak, when the collision happened. Aiyang also had her photo taken the day of the crash. Another woman on the bus, 25-year-old Vipharakh Phaopuree (also known as Rosemary and Rose), posted a photo inside the bus to her social media moments before the crash. Both passengers are believed to be one of the as-of-yet unidentified deaths.

== Investigation ==
Witnesses said the crossing's safety barriers appeared to be malfunctioning prior to the collision. Anutin ordered a formal investigation into the accident which will examine a range of issues, including whether safety barriers were lowered at the crossing. The Department of Rail Transport launched an investigation. Police revealed that the train driver tested positive for methamphetamine, while inspection on the event data recorder of the train revealed that the train driver only applied emergency brakes 100 m (330 ft) before the crash, whereas the safe distance of using the brakes were at least 2 km (1.2 mi).

== Aftermath ==
The collision delayed train operations, with buses being dispatched to transport stranded passengers. In the early hours of 17 May, BMTA used a crane to remove the bus from the crossing and move it to the Rama IX depot. BMTA pledged initial compensation of about 1.5 million baht for every person killed and 80,000-500,000 baht for those injured. 46-year-old Sayomporn Suankul, the train operator, and 56-year-old Lapit Thongboon, the bus driver, were charged with reckless driving causing death, while a railway crossing barrier operator was charged with negligence causing death and injury. Many people online were outraged after a video published by a witness allegedly showed railway barriers failing to close moments before the collision. The collision renewed warnings that motorists must not follow traffic onto railway crossings during congestion unless they are sure there is enough space to clear the tracks completely, as the risk can be fatal.

=== Reactions ===
The Embassy of China, Bangkok said in a statement that they expressed deep condolences and sincere concern for the families of the deceased and injured, wishing the injured a swift recovery.

== See also ==
- List of rail accidents in Thailand
- List of rail accidents (2020–present)
