= Italian-Thai Development =

Thai construction company

Italian-Thai Development PCL
- Type: Public company
- Traded as: SET: ITD
- ISIN: TH0438010Z02
- Industry: Construction
- Founded: 1958; 68 years ago
- Founder: Chaijudh Karnasuta and Giorgio Berlingieri
- Headquarters: Bangkok, Thailand
- Area served: Southeast Asia
- Key people: Virat Kongmaneerat (chairman); Premchai Karnasuta (President)
- Website: www.itd.co.th

Italian-Thai Development Public Company Limited (ITD) is a construction company based in Bangkok, Thailand. Founded in 1958, it is one of the largest construction firms in the country, and is one of the two main contractors commonly hired for large-scale government projects, along with CH. Karnchang. Among its past construction projects are Suvarnabhumi Airport, the original sections of the BTS Skytrain, the northern section of the original MRT Blue Line, and the northern extension of Don Mueang Tollway.

In 2024, ITD announced heavy financial losses mainly from the failure of the Dawei Port Project in Myanmar, which led to a liquidity crisis and downgrading of its credit ratings.

== History ==
In 1954, Chaijudh Karnasuta, a Thai, and Giorgio Berlingieri, an Italian, collaborated in a venture to salvage five sunken ships. The two forged a relationship and they founded Italian-Thai Development (ITD) as a construction company on August 15, 1958. In 1994, the company was publicly listed in the Stock Exchange of Thailand with a registered capital of 2,500 million Baht. The name of the company was subsequently changed to Italian-Thai Development Public Company Limited. ITD was responsible for the construction of the Suvarnabhumi International Airport which was completed in 2006.

On October 8, 2020, the Philippine Department of Transportation awarded Contract Package N-03 of the North-South Commuter Railway Extension to ITD. Valued at approximately PHP 22.8 billion and funded by the Asian Development Bank, the agreement mandated the execution of civil engineering works within the province of Pampanga. The specified scope encompasses the construction of 12 kilometers of elevated railway viaducts, alongside the erection of station structures in Angeles and Clark.

As of January 2026, the chairman of the board is Virat Kongmaneerat, while Premchai Karnasuta serves as president and a director. The company currently has approximately 13 contracts with the Government of Thailand, including subway construction.

== Safety incidents ==
=== 2025 Rama III–Dao Khanong Expressway collapse ===
On 15 March 2025, a segment of the under construction Rama III–Dao Khanong Expressway collapsed onto Rama II Road in Bangkok. The segment's developer was a joint venture including ITD.

=== 2025 Bangkok skyscraper collapse ===
On 28 March 2025, following the collapse of the State Audit Office building during the 2025 Mandalay earthquake, Thai prosecutors indicted ITD, its joint-venture partner China Railway No. 10, and other individuals and companies involved in the State Audit Office building project on charges including breaches of construction regulations and negligence causing death.

The office was the only building in Bangkok to collapse as a result of the earthquake.

=== 2026 Sikhio train disaster ===
On 14 January 2026, a crane operated by ITD constructing a portion of Thailand's Bangkok–Nong Khai high-speed railway in Nakhon Ratchasima collapsed onto on a passenger train with 171 people.

=== 2026 Rama II Road crane collapse ===
On 15 January 2026, a crane and concrete beam used to construct an elevated section of Motorway No. 82 collapsed onto vehicles on Rama II Road in Samut Sakhon province, killing two. ITD was the contractor responsible for the civil engineering.

On 15 January 2026, following the back-to-back days of crane collapses for the high speed rail way and elevated expressway, Thai Prime Minister Anutin Charnvirakul stripped ITD of both contracts. "This has happened multiple times and it’s the same contractors," Anutin said. "I don’t think the state would want this company to continue working." ITD will subsequently be barred from future contract bidding on a case-by-case basis.
