= Premchai Karnasuta =

Thai businessman

Premchai Karnasuta (Thai: เปรมชัย กรรณสูต, RTGS: Premchai Kannasut) is a Thai businessman who serves as the chairman of Italian-Thai Development Plc.

== Poaching arrest ==
In February 2018, park rangers found Premchai and a group of employees in possession of barking deer, kalij pheasant and a black panther in Thungyai Naresuan Wildlife Sanctuary in western Thailand. On 14 August 2019, Premchai was convicted of illegal firearms possession after poaching protected wildlife in a wildlife sanctuary. He was released on parole 12 October 2023, two months before his sentence ended. His early release was attributed to poor health.

== 2025 arrest ==
On 15 May 2025, Thailand's Criminal Court issued an arrest warrant for Premchai in connection with the 2025 Bangkok skyscraper collapse. Premchai surrendered to police on 16 May 2025.
