= 2015 Phachi collision =

Railway incident in Thailand

Details
- Date: 26 March 2015; 22:15
- Location: Phachi District
- Country: Thailand
- Operator: State Railway of Thailand
- Incident type: Rear-end collision
- Cause: Under investigation, suspected SPAD

Statistics
- Trains: 2
- Passengers: 150
- Injured: 52 (3 serious)

On 26 March 2015, two passenger trains collided in Phachi District, Thailand. One train was stationary when it was run into by another. More than 50 people were injured, three seriously.

== Accident ==
The accident occurred at 22:15 local time (15:15 UTC) when an Express Train no.69 from Bangkok to Nong Khai and a Rapid Train no.107 from Bangkok to Den Chai collided. The Nong Khai train was stationary when it was run into by the other. Six carriages were derailed and 52 people were injured, with three of them suffering serious injuries. Damages were estimated at 80 million baht. There were more than 150 passengers on the two trains.

== Investigation ==
According to the investigation by the Thai Police, it is suspected that the driver of the Phrae train passed a red signal, causing the accident.
