= Kanchanaburi province =

Kanchanaburi กาญจนบุรี
- Province
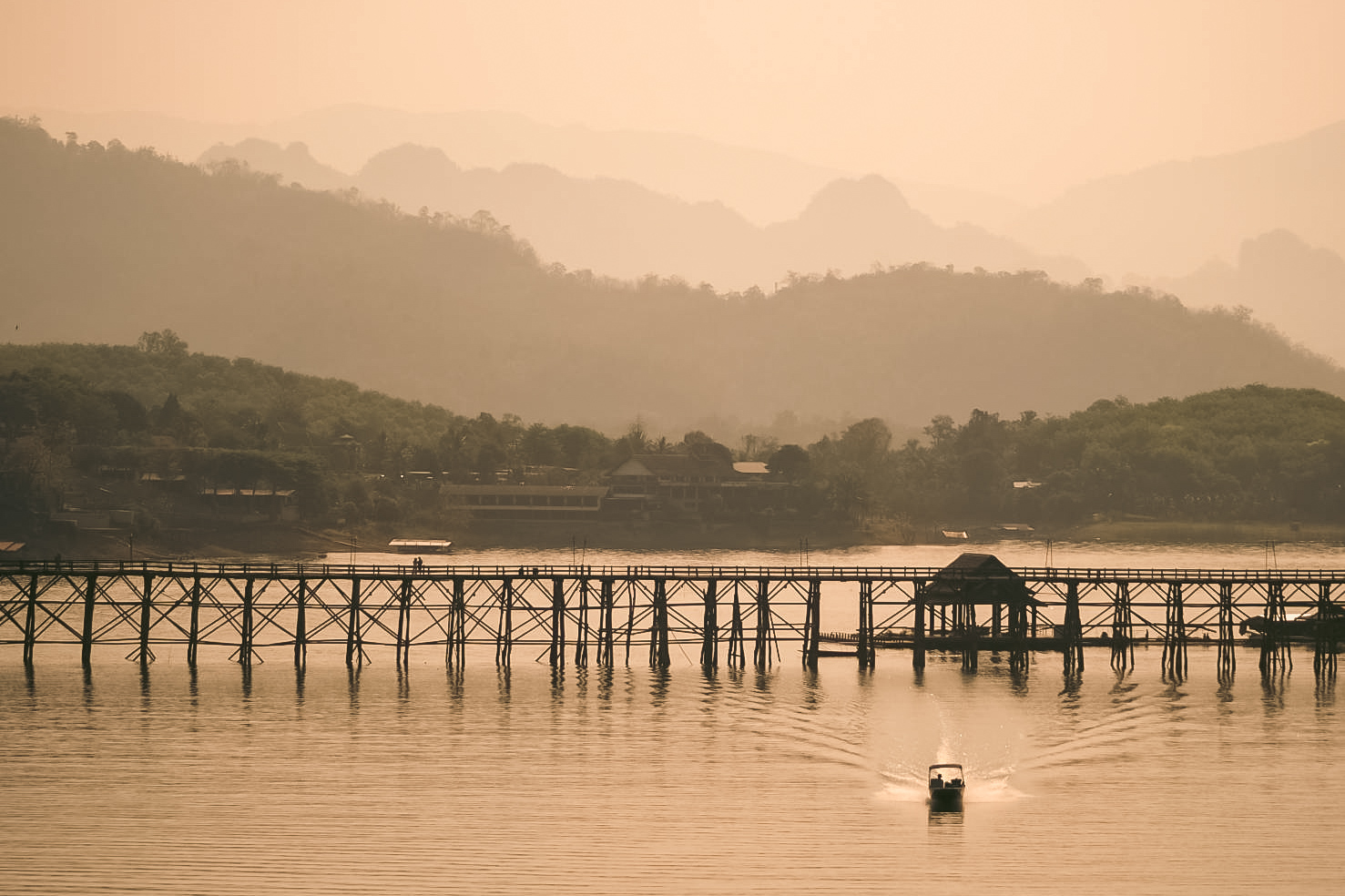
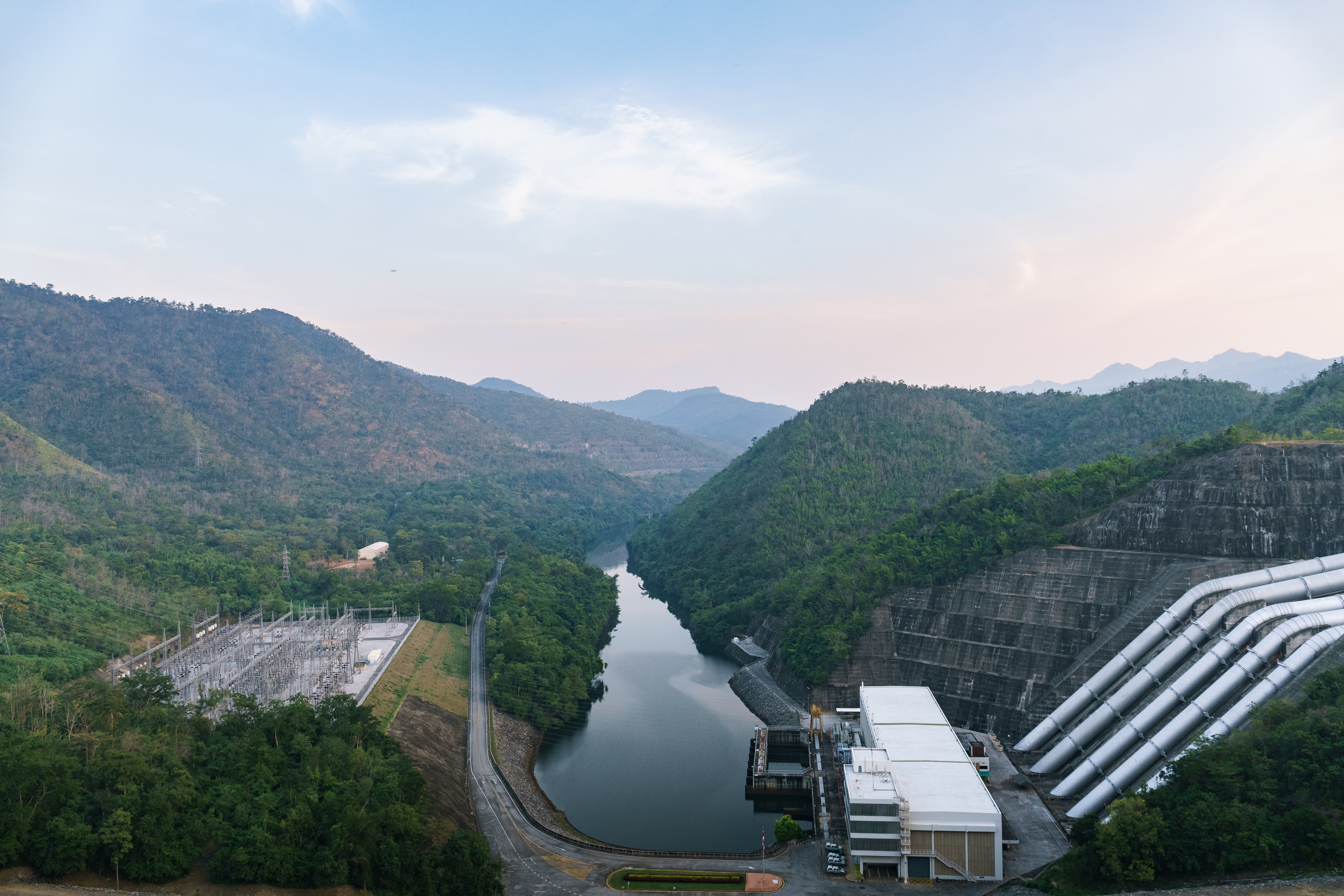
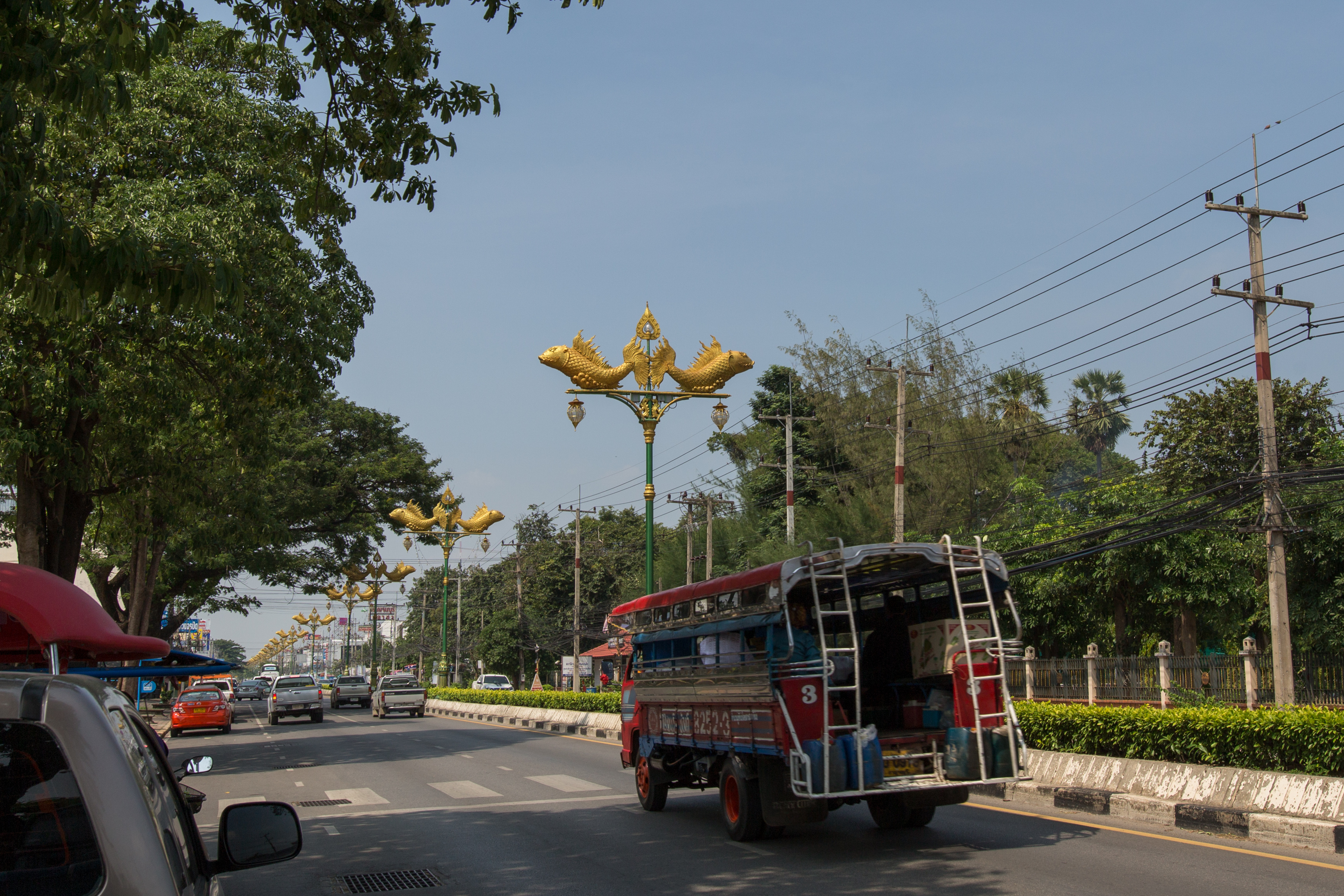
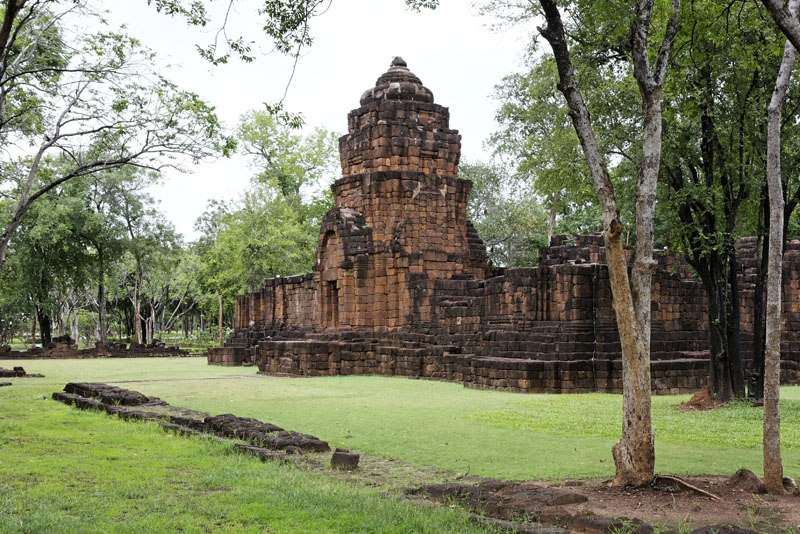
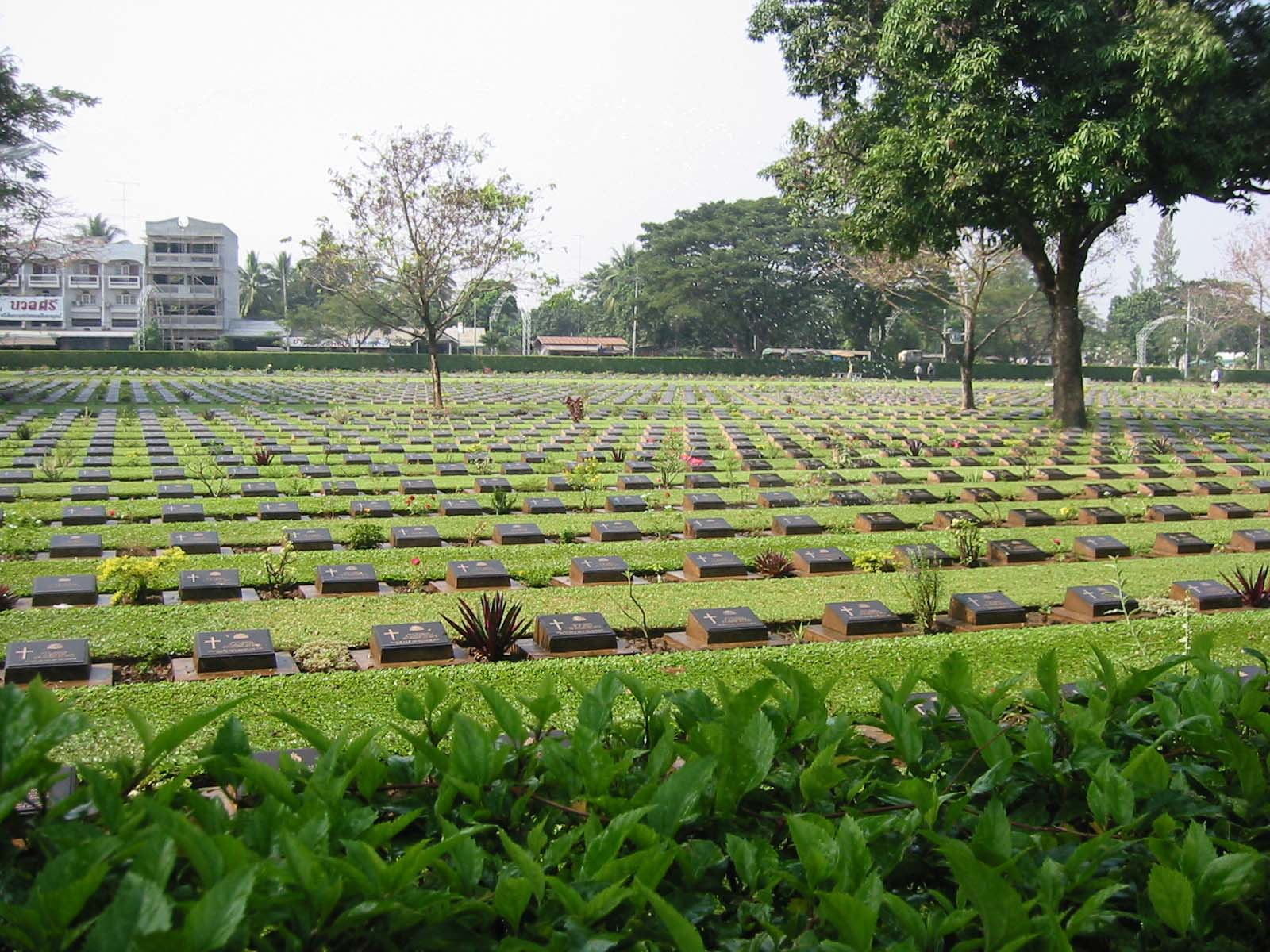
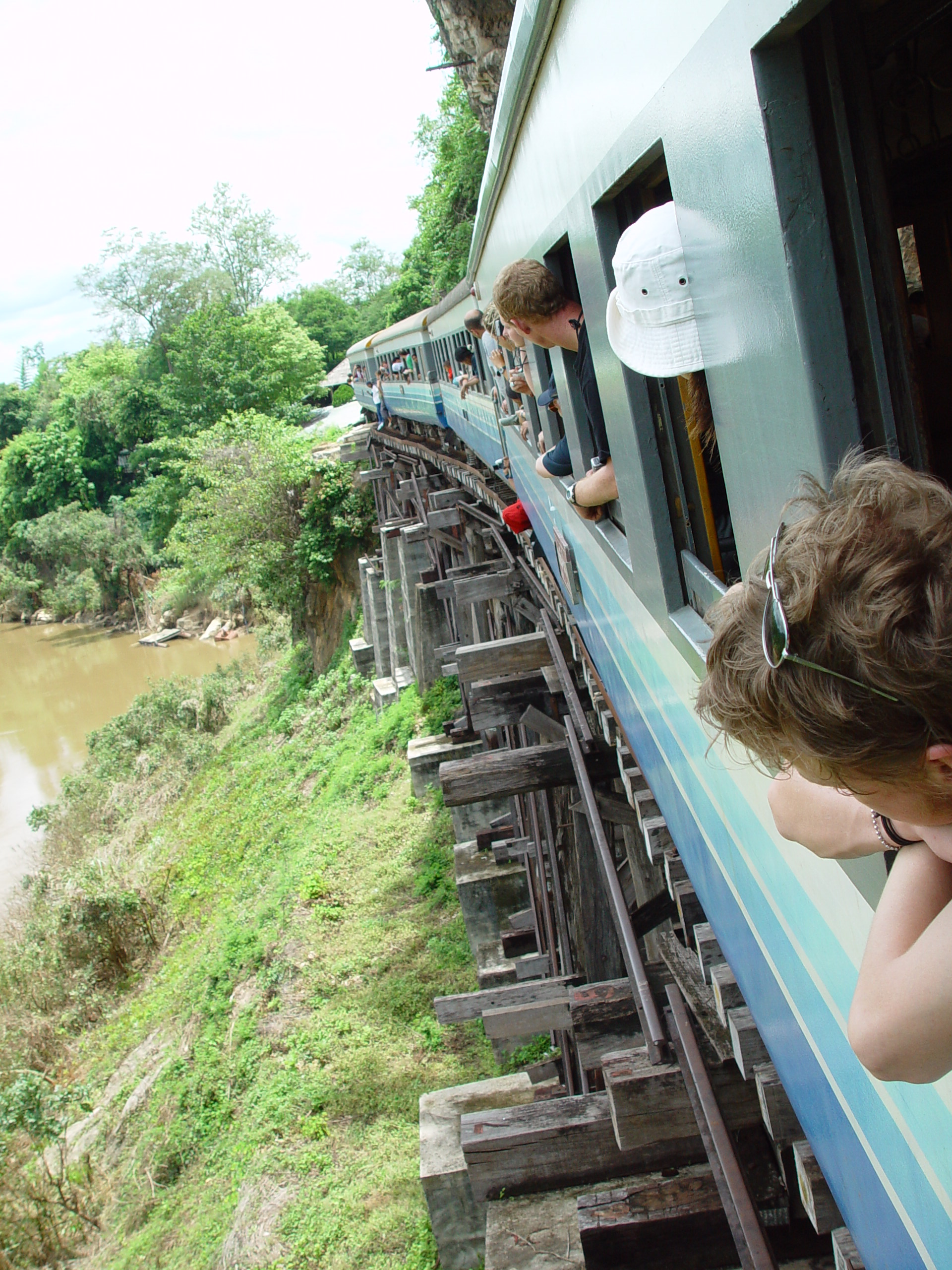
- From top: Mon Bridge, Srinagarind Dam, Kanchanaburi Road, Mueang Sing Historical Park, Kanchanaburi War Cemetery, A train running through the Wang Pho Viaduct along cliffs and the Khwae Noi River

- Flag Seal
- Nickname: Mueang Kan (Thai: เมืองกาญจน์)
- Mottoes: แคว้นโบราณ ด่านเจดีย์ มณีเมืองกาญจน์ สะพานข้ามแม่น้ำแคว แหล่งแร่น้ำตก ("The ancient province. The (Three) Pagodas Pass Checkpoint, Gems of Mueang Kan, Bridge on the River Kwai. Source of minerals and waterfalls.")
- Map of Thailand highlighting Kanchanaburi province
- Coordinates: 14°0′15″N 99°32′57″E
- Country: Thailand
- Capital: Kanchanaburi

Government
  - Type: Province and Provincial Administrative Organization
  - Body: Kanchanaburi Province and Kanchanaburi Provincial Administrative Organization
  - Governor: Athisarn Inthra
  - PAO Chief Executive: Prawat Kitthamkulnit

Area
  - Total: 19,482 km^{2} (7,522 sq mi)
  - Rank: 3rd

Population (2024)
  - Total: ▼896,351
  - Rank: 26th
  - Density: 46/km^{2} (120/sq mi)
  - Rank: 74th

Human Achievement Index
  - HAI (2022): 0.6372 "average" Ranked 43rd

GDP
  - Total: baht 97 billion (US$3.5 billion) (2019)
- Time zone: UTC+7 (ICT)
- Postal code: 71xxx
- Calling code: 034
- ISO 3166 code: TH-71
- Vehicle registration: กาญจนบุรี
- Website: kanchanaburi.go.th

Kanchanaburi (กาญจนบุรี, pronounced [kāːn.t͡ɕā.ná(ʔ).bū.rīː]) is the largest province (changwat) of Western Thailand. Tourists are attracted by the history of its ancient civilization and the World War II Bridge over the River Kwai, originally spelt "Khwae" but officially changed to Kwai to accommodate the expectations of tourists.

== History ==
Historical affiliations

Dvaravati 802–1052
Kingdom of Suphanburi 1052–1409
Kingdom of Ayutthaya 1409–1766
(Konbaung dynasty) Kingdom of Konbaung 1766–1786
Kingdom of Siam 1786–1932
Kingdom of Thailand 1932–present

Archaeological remains found in Kanchanaburi date back to the 4th century, with evidence of trade with surrounding regions at that time. Very little is known about the historical Khmer influence in Kanchanaburi, but Prasat Muang Sing, one of the country's most well-known Khmer sites, provides evidence of their occupation.

Not much was historically recorded about Kanchanaburi province before the reign of King Rama I, but some historians believe that the province was of strategic importance during the Ayutthaya period, since it was on the invasion route from Burma. In 1982, many human and elephant skeletons and swords were found in Phanom Thuan district, leading to speculation that this site might even have been the site of the famous battle of King Naresuan against the Burmese crown prince, most commonly assigned to the Don Chedi district in nearby Suphanburi province.

Most foreigners are mainly aware of Kanchanaburi's recent history with the Burma Railway. During the Japanese occupation of Thailand in 1942, both allied POWs and Asian labourers were ordered by the Japanese to build a Thailand-Burma railway. Eventually, more than 100,000 people (16,000 allied POWs and 90,000 local Asian labourers) died from horrific working conditions.

== Geography ==
The province is in the west of Thailand, 129 km from Bangkok, and covers a total area of approximately 19,482 km^{2} (7,522 sq mi). It is the country's third largest province, after Nakhon Ratchasima and Chiang Mai. Topographically, it is covered with timber and evergreen forests. The total forest area is 11,990 km^{2} (4,630 sq mi) or 61.5 percent of provincial area. The district covers the source valleys of the rivers Kwae Yai and Kwae Noi ("River Kwai"), which merge at Kanchanaburi city to form the Mae Klong River.
The neighboring provinces are (clockwise, from the north) Tak, Uthai Thani, Suphan Buri, Nakhon Pathom, and Ratchaburi. In the west it borders Kayin State, Mon State, and the Tanintharyi Region of Myanmar.
Bong Ti is a transnational border crossing point, which is expected to gain in importance if the planned Dawei deepwater port project goes ahead, along with a highway and a railway line between Bangkok and the port.

=== National parks ===
Seven of the nine national parks in the mountainous areas of the Tenasserim Hills from region 3 (Ban Pong), Phu Toei and Thai Prachan national parks are not in Kanchanaburi province, form protected areas in Kanchanaburi province.(visitors in fiscal year 2024)

Khuean Srinagarindra National Park	1,532 km^{2} (592 sq mi)	(70,980)
Khao Laem National Park	1,497 km^{2} (578 sq mi)	(48,599)
Thong Pha Phum National Park	1,236 km^{2} (477 sq mi)	(123,285)
Lam Khlong Ngu National Park	673 km^{2} (260 sq mi)	(6,026)
Erawan National Park	550 km^{2} (210 sq mi)	(519,235)
Sai Yok National Park	500 km^{2} (190 sq mi)	(67,698)
Chaloem Rattanakosin National Park	59 km^{2} (23 sq mi)	(27,715)

=== Wildlife sanctuaries ===
Two of three wildlife sanctuaries from region 3 (Ban Pong), Mae Nam Phachi is not in Kanchanaburi province, are the protected areas of Kanchanaburi province.

Thung Yai Naresuan West; Wildlife Sanctuary	2,130 km^{2} (820 sq mi)
Salak Phra Wildlife Sanctuary	859 km^{2} (332 sq mi)

=== Climate ===
Kanchanaburi province has a tropical savanna climate (Köppen climate classification Aw). Winters are dry and very warm. Temperatures rise until April, which is very hot with the average daily maximum at 37.8 °C (100.0 °F). The monsoon season runs from May through October, with heavy rain and somewhat cooler temparatures during the day, although nights remain warm.

Climate data for Thong Pha Phum (1991–2020, extremes 1970-present)
Month	Jan	Feb	Mar	Apr	May	Jun	Jul	Aug	Sep	Oct	Nov	Dec	Year
Record high °C (°F)	37.3 (99.1)	39.2 (102.6)	41.3 (106.3)	43.0 (109.4)	42.3 (108.1)	38.0 (100.4)	36.5 (97.7)	36.2 (97.2)	35.7 (96.3)	36.0 (96.8)	37.3 (99.1)	39.2 (102.6)	43.0 (109.4)
Mean daily maximum °C (°F)	33.6 (92.5)	35.7 (96.3)	37.4 (99.3)	37.8 (100.0)	34.8 (94.6)	32.4 (90.3)	31.3 (88.3)	31.1 (88.0)	32.3 (90.1)	33.0 (91.4)	32.9 (91.2)	32.5 (90.5)	33.7 (92.7)
Daily mean °C (°F)	24.9 (76.8)	26.9 (80.4)	29.0 (84.2)	29.9 (85.8)	28.5 (83.3)	27.3 (81.1)	26.7 (80.1)	26.5 (79.7)	26.8 (80.2)	26.8 (80.2)	25.8 (78.4)	24.3 (75.7)	27.0 (80.5)
Mean daily minimum °C (°F)	17.5 (63.5)	18.9 (66.0)	21.2 (70.2)	23.1 (73.6)	24.0 (75.2)	23.8 (74.8)	23.4 (74.1)	23.2 (73.8)	23.2 (73.8)	22.4 (72.3)	20.1 (68.2)	17.6 (63.7)	21.5 (70.8)
Record low °C (°F)	5.4 (41.7)	8.1 (46.6)	11.5 (52.7)	15.0 (59.0)	17.0 (62.6)	19.5 (67.1)	20.0 (68.0)	19.5 (67.1)	19.2 (66.6)	13.9 (57.0)	9.4 (48.9)	5.2 (41.4)	5.2 (41.4)
Average precipitation mm (inches)	7.2 (0.28)	11.5 (0.45)	53.2 (2.09)	94.8 (3.73)	206.5 (8.13)	249.6 (9.83)	353.3 (13.91)	344.9 (13.58)	250.6 (9.87)	164.1 (6.46)	20.7 (0.81)	5.4 (0.21)	1,761.8 (69.36)
Average precipitation days (≥ 1.0 mm)	0.7	1.2	3.9	6.7	15.6	20.8	23.9	24.2	20.2	13.0	2.1	0.6	132.9
Average relative humidity (%)	71.8	65.3	63.7	68.7	79.1	84.6	86.6	87.3	85.9	84.0	79.3	75.4	77.6
Mean monthly sunshine hours	279.0	262.7	275.9	276.0	155.0	114.0	58.9	58.9	54.0	145.7	219.0	279.0	2,178.1
Mean daily sunshine hours	9.0	9.3	8.9	9.2	5.0	3.8	1.9	1.9	1.8	4.7	7.3	9.0	6.0
Source 1: World Meteorological Organization
Source 2: Office of Water Management and Hydrology, Royal Irrigation Department (sun 1981–2010)(extremes)

== Symbols ==
The seal of the province shows the three stupas on Bantadthong Mountain. They give the name to the mountain pass to Myanmar, called "Three Pagodas Pass".

The provincial flower is the night-flowering jasmine (Nyctanthes arbortristis). The provincial tree is the Moulmein lancewood (Homalium tomentosum). The provincial aquatic animal is the Jullien's golden carp (Probarbus jullieni).

The provincial motto is "The ancient province. The (Three) Pagodas Pass Checkpoint, Gems of Kan, Bridge on the River Kwai. Source of minerals and waterfalls."

== Demographics ==
=== Population ===
Population history of Kanchanaburi province is as follows:

1947	1960	1970	1980	1990	2000	2011	2020
140,164	233,000	321,000	518,927	697,750	734,394	838,914	891,976

=== Religion ===
There are total 613 Theravada Buddhist temples in the province.
79 in Mueang Kanchanaburi, 68 in Lao Khwan, 68 in Sai Yok, 59 in Thong Pha Phum, 55 in Tha Muang,
46 in Tha Maka, 43 in Bo Phloi, 40 in Phanom Thuan, 37 in Si Sawat, 36 in Nong Prue, 32 in Dan Makham Tia,
32 in Huai Krachao, 18 in Sangkhla Buri.

There are 36 Christian churches and seven Mosques.

== Administration ==
=== Provincial administration ===
Kanchanaburi is divided into 13 districts (amphoe). The districts are further divided into 107 subdistricts (tambon).

Kanchanaburi province with 13 districts

No.	District	Thai	Pop.	Subd.	Villages
1	Mueang Kanchanaburi	เมืองกาญจนบุรี	168,541	15	102
2	Sai Yok	ไทรโยค	66,733	7	57
3	Bo Phloi	บ่อพลอย	57,176	9	80
4	Si Sawat	ศรีสวัสดิ์	26,857	6	33
5	Tha Maka	ท่ามะกา	131,797	17	154
6	Tha Muang	ท่าม่วง	109,000	13	119
7	Thong Pha Phum	ทองผาภูมิ	71,315	7	45
8	Sangkhla Buri	สังขละบุรี	54,459	3	21
9	Phanom Thuan	พนมทวน	52,319	12	103
10	Lao Khwan	เลาขวัญ	58,587	7	90
11	Dan Makham Tia	ด่านมะขามเตี้ย	33,736	4	41
12	Nong Prue	หนองปรือ	31,732	3	43
13	Huai Krachao	ห้วยกระเจา	34,098	4	73
		Total	896,351	107	961

=== Local government ===
As of December 2024 there are: one Kanchanaburi provincial administrative organization - PAO (ongkan borihan suan changwat - o bo toh) and 46 municipal (thesaban) areas in the province. Mueang Kanchanaburi, Pak Phraek and Tha Ruea Phra Thaen are town municipalities (thesaban mueang) and 43 are subdistrict municipalities (thesaban tambon).

Town municipality	District	Pop.
Pak Phraek	Mueang	28,590
Mueang Kanchanaburi	Mueang	24,624
Tha Ruea Phra Thaen	Tha Maka	10,357

Subdistrict mun.	District	Pop.
Tha Makham	Mueang	11,782
Nong Bua	Mueang	7,120
Kaeng Sian	Mueang	6,457
Lat Ya	Mueang	5,413
Sai Yok	Sai Yok	11,235
Namtok Sai Yok Noi	Sai Yok	3,914
Wang Pho	Sai Yok	2,120
Bo Phloi	Bo Phloi	6,692
Nong Ri	Bo Phloi	2,155
Khao Chot	Si Sawat	4,602
Erawan	Si Sawat	1,013
Tha Mai	Tha Maka	8,884
Tha Maka	Tha Maka	8,027
Phra Thaen	Tha Maka	6,195
Nong Lan	Tha Maka	4,743
Wat Niao	Tha Maka	4,389
Don Khamin	Tha Maka	4,299
Phra Thaen Lam Phraya	Tha Maka	3,622
Luk Kae	Tha Maka	3,305
Wang Sala	Tha Muang	11,781
Tha Muang	Tha Muang	9,351
Wang Khanai	Tha Muang	9,331
Tha Lo	Tha Muang	9,230

Subdistrict mun.	District	Pop.
Muang Chum	Tha Muang	5,495
Nong Khao	Tha Muang	4,857
Nong Ya Dok Khao	Tha Muang	4,570
Nong Tak Ya	Tha Muang	3,045
Samrong	Tha Muang	1,778
Tha Khanun	Thong Pha Phum	18,128
Linthin	Thong Pha Phum	8,595
Sahakon Nikhon	Thong Pha Phum	5,679
Thong Pha Phum	Thong Pha Phum	3,052
Wang Ka	Sangkhla Buri	9,769
Rang Wai	Phanom Thuan	7,169
Phanom Thuan	Phanom Thuan	5,082
Don Chedi	Phanom Thuan	4,881
Talat Khet	Phanom Thuan	3,985
Nong Sarai	Phanom Thuan	3,667
Lao Khwan	Lao Khwan	2,648
Nong Fai	Lao Khwan	2,203
Dan Makham Tia	Dan Makham Tia	2,433
Somdet Charoen	Nong Prue	6,986
Nong Pla Lai	Nong Prue	6,536
Nong Prue	Nong Prue	4,375
Huai Krachao	Huai Krachao	9,134
Salong Ruea	Huai Krachao	6,536

The non-municipal areas are administered by 72 Subdistrict Administrative Organizations (SAO) (ongkan borihan suan tambon):

12 Tha Maka	9 Mueang	8 Tha Muang	7 Lao Khwan	6 Bo Phloi	6 Sai Yok	5 Phanom Thuan
5 Si Sawat	4 Dan Makham Tia	4 Thong Pha Phum	3 Sangkhla Buri	2 Huai Krachao	1 Nong Prue

=== Population ===
The total population of Kanchanaburi province is 896,351, of which Mueang Kanchanaburi district is the most populated with 168,541 people. Tha Maka and Tha Muang districts also have a population exceeding 100,000 people. The remaining ten districts have populations of 27,000 to 71,000, of which Si Sawat district is the least populated district with 26,857 people.

Population 2024 census
	District	Population		Area			Population density	
	District	Data	Proportion	km^{2}	sq mile	Proportion	per km^{2}	per sq mile
1	Mueang	168,541	18.8%	1,236	477	6.3%	136	353
2	Tha Maka	131,797	14.7%	341	131	1.8%	386	1,006
3	Tha Muang	109,000	12.2%	611	236	3.1%	178	461
4	Thong Pha Phum	71,315	8.0%	3,655	1,411	18.8%	20	50
5	Sai Yok	66,733	7.4%	2,729	1,054	14.0%	24	63
6	Lao Khwam	58,587	6.5%	831	321	4.3%	70	183
7	Bo Phloi	57,176	6.4%	967	373	5.0%	59	153
8	Sangkhla Buri	54,459	6.1%	3,349	1,293	17.2%	16	42
9	Phanom Thuan	52,319	5.8%	536	207	2.7%	98	252
10	Huai Krachao	34,098	3.8%	622	240	3.2%	55	142
11	Dan Makham Tia	33,736	3.8%	807	312	4.1%	42	108
12	Nong Prue	31,732	3.5%	502	194	2.6%	63	163
13	Si Sawat	26,857	3.0%	3,296	1,273	16.9%	8	21
	Total	896,351	100.0%	19,482	7,522	100.0%	46	119

The population density of Kanchanaburi province is 46 people per square kilometer (119 people per sq mile, of which Tha Maka district has the highest density with 386 people per square km (1,006 people per sq mile) and Si Sawat district the lowest density with 8 people per square km (21 people per sq mile)

== Health ==
=== Government hospitals ===
There are seventeen government hospitals in Kanchanaburi provinces, of which Mueang Kanchanaburi district has two hospitals:

- Phaholpolpayuhasena Hospital with 597 beds
- Fort Surasi Hospital with 80 beds

The other twelve districts each have a hospital, but Nong Prue, Sai Yok and Si Sawat districts each have two hospitals as an exception.

=== Private hospitals ===
There are four private hospitals in Kanchanaburi province, of which Mueang Kanchanaburi district has two hospitals:

- Synphaet Kanchanaburi Hospital with 100 beds
- Thanakan Hospital with 74 beds

The other two hospitals are:
in Sangkhla Buri district:

- Christian Hospital of the Sangkhla Buri Christian Center with 30 beds.

In Tha Maka district:

- Tha Ruea Hospital with 29 beds.

=== Health promoting hospitals ===
There are total 142 health-promoting hospitals in the province, of which: 22 in Mueang Kanchanaburi, 15 in Tha Maka, 14 in Tha Muang, 13 in Lao Khwan, 13 in Thong Pha Phum, 12 in Sai Yok, 10 in Bo Phloi, 9 in Phanom Thuan, 9 in Si Sawat, 7 in Nong Prue, 6 in Dan Makham Tia, 6 in Sangkhla Buri and 6 in Huai Krachao.

=== Clinics ===
Around 234 clinics are in Kanchanaburi province, of which 89 clinics (38%) in Mueang Kanchanaburi district, 43 in Tha Muang, 39 in Tha Maka, 12 in Bo Phloi, 10 in Thong Pha Phum, 9 in Lao Khwan, 7 in Dan Makham Tia, 7 in Phanom Thuan, 5 in Si Sawat, 4 in Nong Prue, 4 in Sangkhla Buri, 3 in Sai Yok and 2 in Huai Krachao.

== Education ==
In Kanchanaburi province there are many educational institutions at all levels, from kindergarten to university level, both government and private.

=== Higher education ===
There are four higher education institutes in the province with 12,984 students:

- Kanchanaburi Rajabhat University
- Faculty of Science, Mahidol University
- Western University
- Ramkhamhaeng University Kanchanaburi Campus.www.kan.ru.ac.th

=== Vocational education ===
- Total nine vocational colleges with 8,518 students.

=== Secondary education ===
- Total 44 upper secondary schools with 18,165 students.
- Total 115 lower secondary schools with 30,067 students.

=== Primary education ===
- Total 332 primary schools with 90,594 pupils.

== Economy ==
=== Economic output ===
In 2022, Kanchanaburi province had an economic output of 121.372 billion baht (US$3.500 billion). This amounts to per capita gross provincial product (GPP) of 146,600 baht (US$3,800). In 2024 the total workforce was 482,596 of which 477,846 persons were employed in economic activity. In agriculture and fishery 200,207 persons (41.9%) were employed and in the non-agricultural sector 277,639 persons (58.1%).

Gross Provincial Product (GPP)
	Activities	Baht	Percent
1	Agriculture + fishery	30,384,000,000	25.0
2	Manufacturing	29,638,000,000	24.4
3	Trade	14,320,000,000	11.8
4	Defence / publ.admin.	9,167,000,000	7.6
5	Education	6,081,000,000	5.0
6	Finance	5,002,000,000	4.1
7	Real estate	4,080,000,000	3.3
8	Construction	3,846,000,000	3.2
9	Human health	3,495,000,000	2.9
10	Transportation	3,369,000,000	2.8
11	Energy	2,933,000,000	2.4
12	Accommodation / food	2,823,000,000	2.3
13	Mining	2,375,000,000	2.0
14	Administration	1,459,000,000	1.2
15	Other service activity	732,000,000	0.6
16	Information	661,000,000	0.5
17	Pastime	546,000,000	0.5
18	Water supply	361,000,000	0.3
19	Scientific activity	100,000,000	0.1
	Total	121,372,000,000	100

Employed persons
	Activities	Workforce	Percent
1	Agriculture and fishery	200,207	41.9
2	Trade	89,139	18.6
3	Manufacturing	41,611	8.7
4	Accommodation and food	30,009	6.3
5	Defence and publ.admin.	29,725	6.2
6	Construction	29,061	6.1
7	Education	13,130	2.7
8	Human health	9,235	1.9
9	Other service activity	6,793	1.4
10	Transportation	6,141	1.3
11	Pastime	5,122	1.1
12	Finance	4,359	0.9
13	Mining	3,109	0.7
14	Administration	2,917	0.6
15	Energy	2,620	0.5
16	Water supply	1,714	0.4
17	Household enterprise	1,344	0.3
18	Real estate	715	0.2
19	Information	485	0.1
20	Scientific activity	410	0.1
	Total	477,846	100

=== Agriculture ===
Agriculture in Kanchanaburi province, the biggest sector of the economy, generated 30.384 billion baht (US$800 million) or 25% of GPP with a workforce of 200,207 (41.9% of all employed persons).

Agricultural land use, 3,752 km^{2} (1,449 sq mi) is 19.3% of total land of Kanchanaburi province 19,482 km^{2} (7,522 sq mi). This is divided as follows: upland rice: 2,231 km^{2} (861 sq mi) 60%, paddy land: 601 km^{2} (232 sq mi) 16%, orchard/perennial crop: 399 km^{2} (154 sq mi) 10%, farmland: 296 km^{2} (114 sq mi) 8% and vegetable/ornamental plant: 225 km^{2} (87 sq mi) 6%.

Production of the three main arable crops: sugarcane 4,391,262 tonnes, cassava 1,929,485 tonnes and rice 340,812 tonnes.

Production of the four main vegetable crops: baby corn 104,320 tonnes, sweet corn 33,102 tonnes, leaf mustard 16,023 and Chinese kale 12,636 tonnes.

Agricultural commodities produced in significant amounts include: oil palm 30,394 tonnes and para rubber 21,931 tonnes. Further there are: pomelo 7,608 tonnes; durian 1,248 tonnes; longan 1,002 tonnes and sweet banana 998 tonnes.

=== Animal husbandry ===
Livestock produced included: chickens 35,073,217, ducks 722,269, swines 684,008, beef cattle 333,357, goats 123,607, dairy cattle 33,065, sheep 32,208 and buffalo 12,059.

=== Fisheries ===
Total catch from 3,589 freshwater aquaculture companies amounted to 6,458,662 tonnes.

=== Manufacturing ===
The second sector of the economy generated 29,638 billion baht (US$780 million) or 24.4% of GPP with 600 registered companies and a workforce of 41,611 people (8.7%).

A few of these companies are:

- METRO M.D.F. Co.Ltd. - MDF products
- Mitr Kasetr Industry Co.Ltd. - producing sugar
- Pradit Co.Ltd. - sugarcane harvester parts
- SEWT Kanchanaburi Ltd. - wiring harnasses for vehicles

=== Trade ===
Wholesale and retail trade; repair of motor vehicles and motorcycles, the third sector of the economy generated 14,320 billion baht (US$377 million) or 11.8% of GPP with 1,539 registered entities and a workforce of 41,611 (8.7%).

=== Construction ===
With 932 construction entities and a workforce of 29,061 people (6.1%) contributed 3,846 billion baht (US$102 million) or 3.2% of GPP.

=== Transportation ===
Transportation with 242 companies and 6,141 people (1.3%) contributed 3,269 billion baht (US$86 million) or 2.8% of GPP.

Kanchanaburi's main railway station is Kanchanaburi railway station, served by the Southern Line Nam Tok Branch Line (Burma Railway).

=== Accommodation and food service activities ===
250 registered hotels, restaurants and food service activities contributed 2,823 billion baht (US$74.6 million) or 2.3 percent of GPP, with a workforce numbering 30,009 (6.3%).

=== Mining ===
92 mining companies with a workforce of 3,109 people (0.7%) contributed 2,375 billion baht (US$62.5 million) or 2.0 percemt of GPP.

In 1918, alluvial sapphire deposits were discovered near Bo Ploi. It was a major source of sapphires in the 1980s and 1990s.

Kanchanaburi province is the site of Klity Creek, a waterway heavily polluted by the practices of the Lead Concentrate Company. The company was ordered by a Thai court to clean up its environmental damage in 2013. To date (2019) the court ordered clean-up has been halting and ineffectual.

=== Tourism ===
There were 15,073 rooms in accommodations in 2022; about 11,372,646 people which 11,289,583 Thai (99.3%) and 83,063 foreigners (0.7%) visited Kanchanaburi province and contributed 23.88 billion baht (US$628 million) to tourism revenues. Further explained: 2,961,859 tourists of which 2,897,536 thai and 64,323 foreigners; 8,410,787 excursionists of which 8,392,047 thai and 18,740 foreigners. Compared to the two previous years 2020 and 2021, the number of people decreased by 3.3 and 5.5% respectively.

The Thailand–Burma Railway Centre, which gives a good introduction of the Burma Railway and its history. There are also two war cemeteries, Kanchanaburi War Cemetery and Chungkai War Cemetery.

The JEATH War Museum is located near the Thailand–Burma Railway station of Kanchanaburi. Although it is called the War Museum, the museum also houses a historical art gallery with murals and statues of historical figures and events from that region. Moreover, aside from WWII artifacts, there is also a sanctuary for stray cats, a wildlife atrium, a Miss Thailand costume museum, an archive library from the founder of the museum, the Chansiri family. The museum was inaugurated on May 11, 1987.

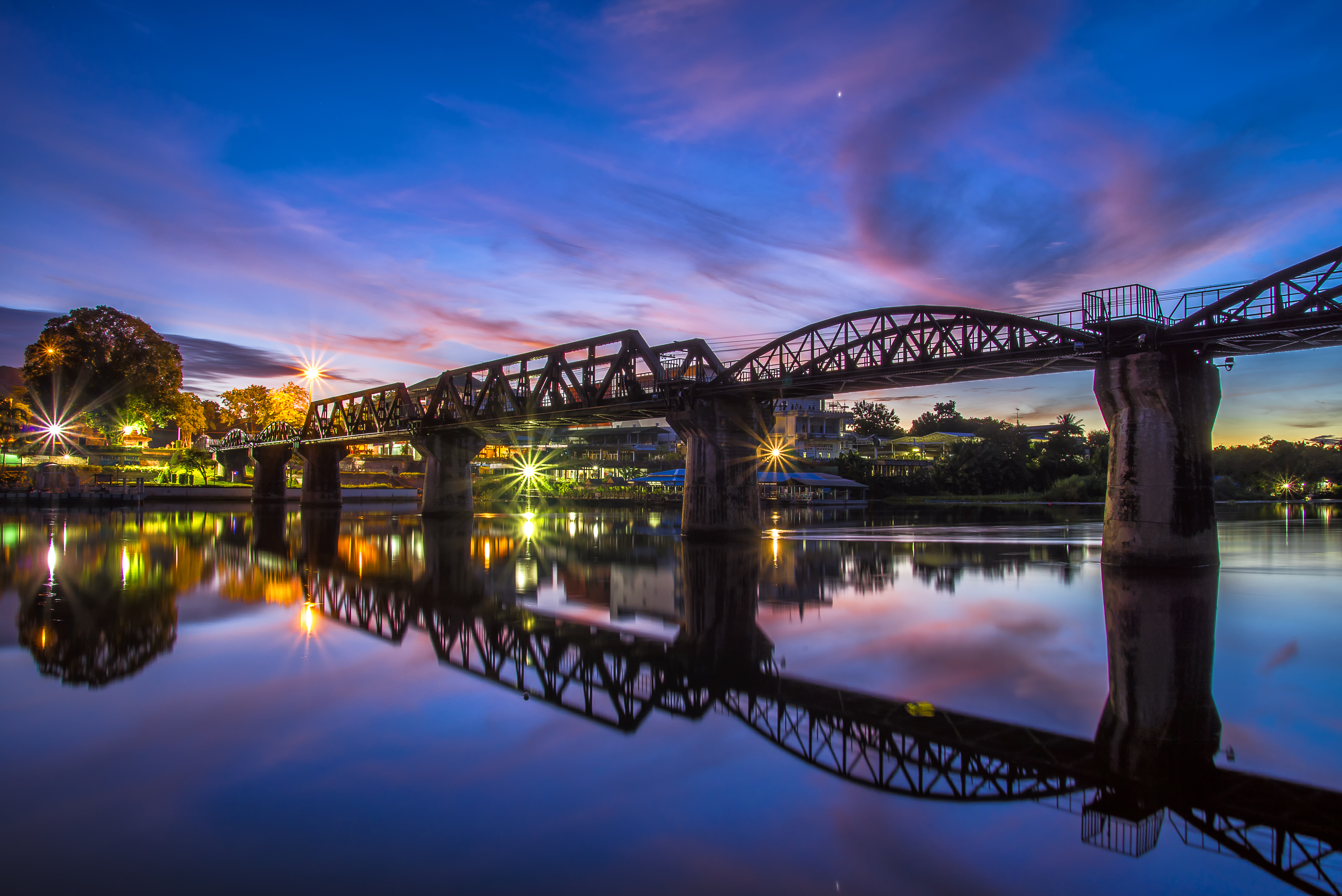
Bridge over the River Khwai

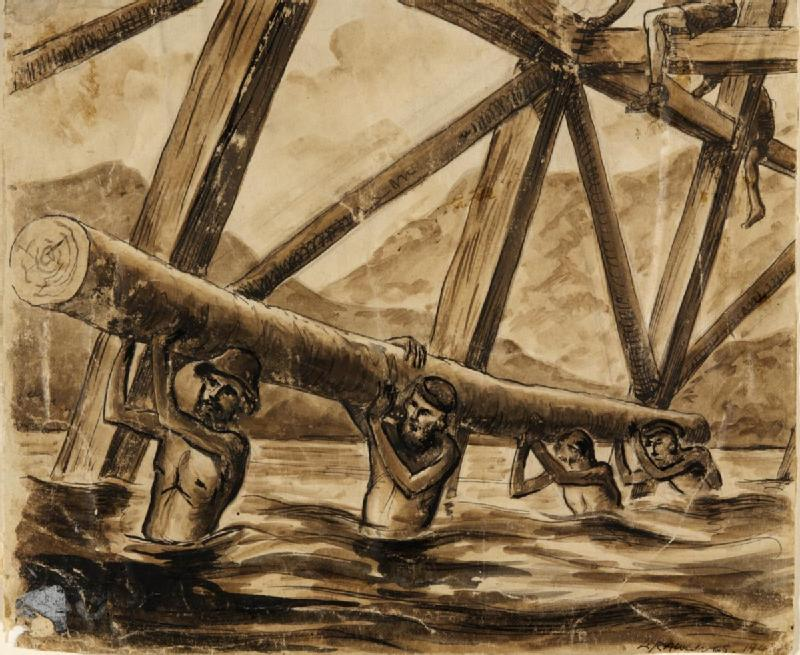
"Bridge over the River Kwai" by Leo Rawlings,
a POW who was involved in the line's construction

== Location ==
Overview protected areas of Kanchanaburi

Kanchanaburi protected areas

	National park
2	Chaloem Rattanakosin
3	Erawan
4	Khao Laem
5	Khuean Srinagarindra
6	Lam Khlong Ngu
8	Sai Yok
9	Thong Pha Phum

	Wildlife sanctuary
11	Salak Phra
12	Thung Yai Naresuan West

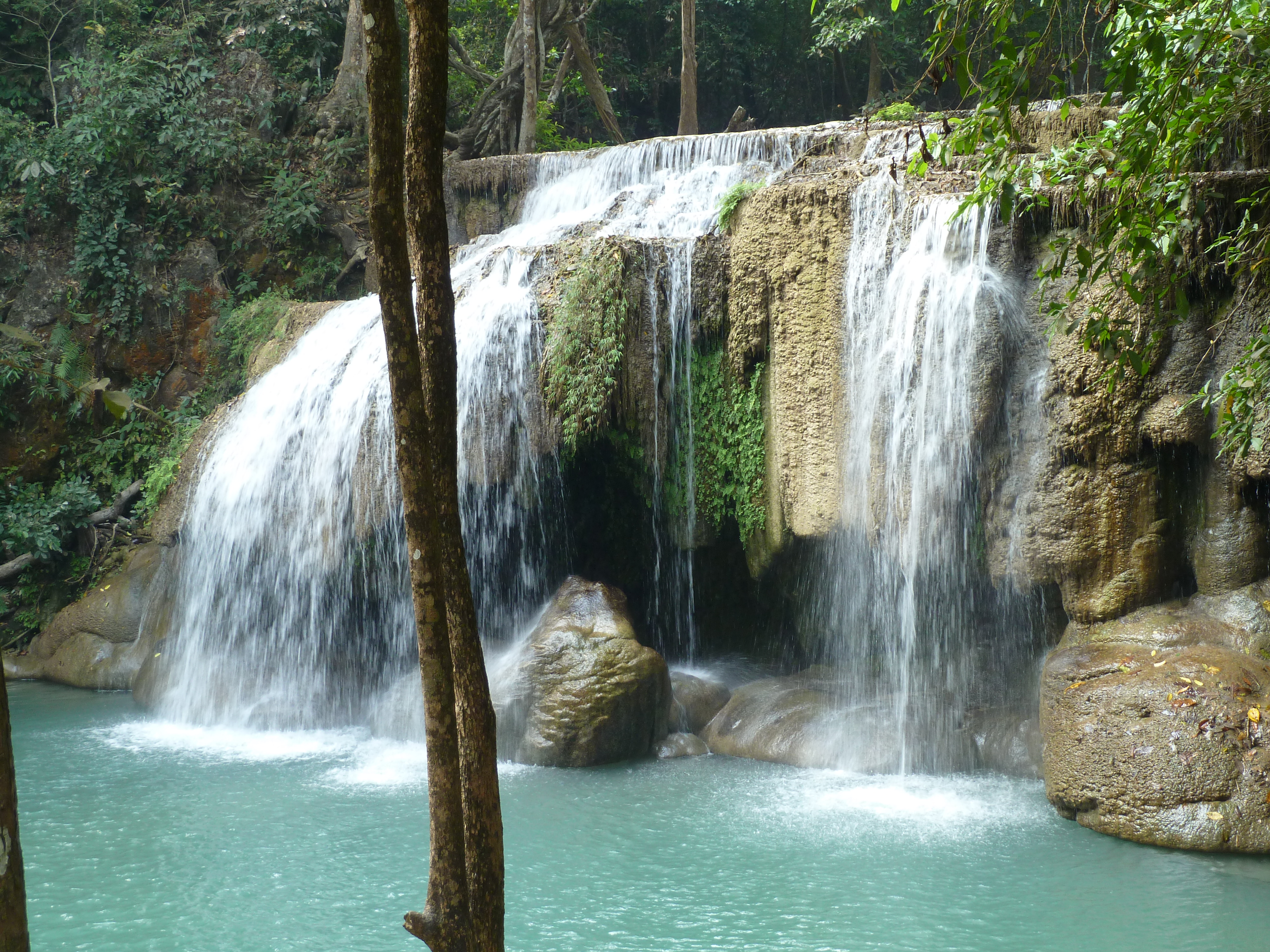
Erawan Waterfall level 3

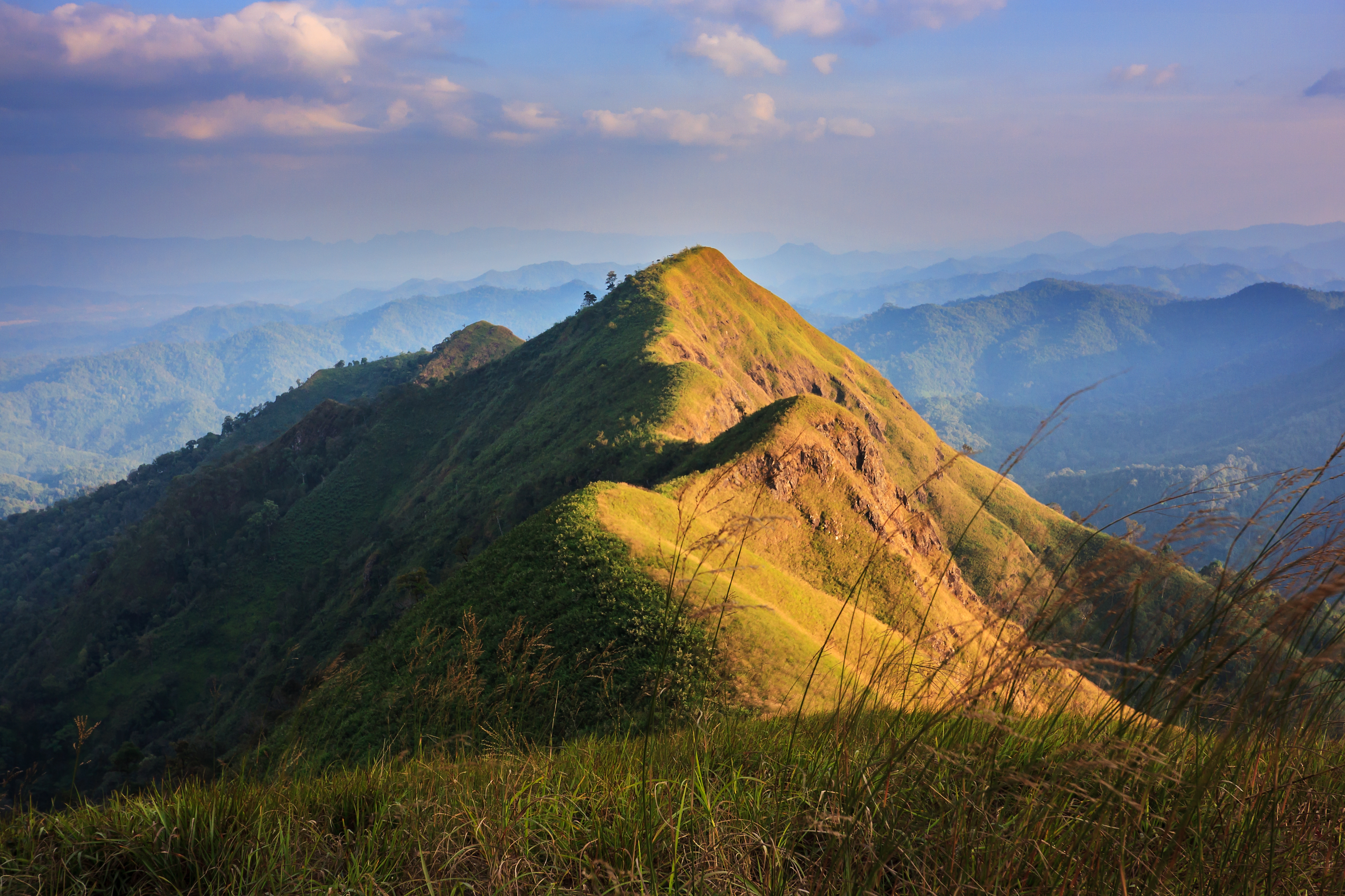
Thong Pha Phum National Park

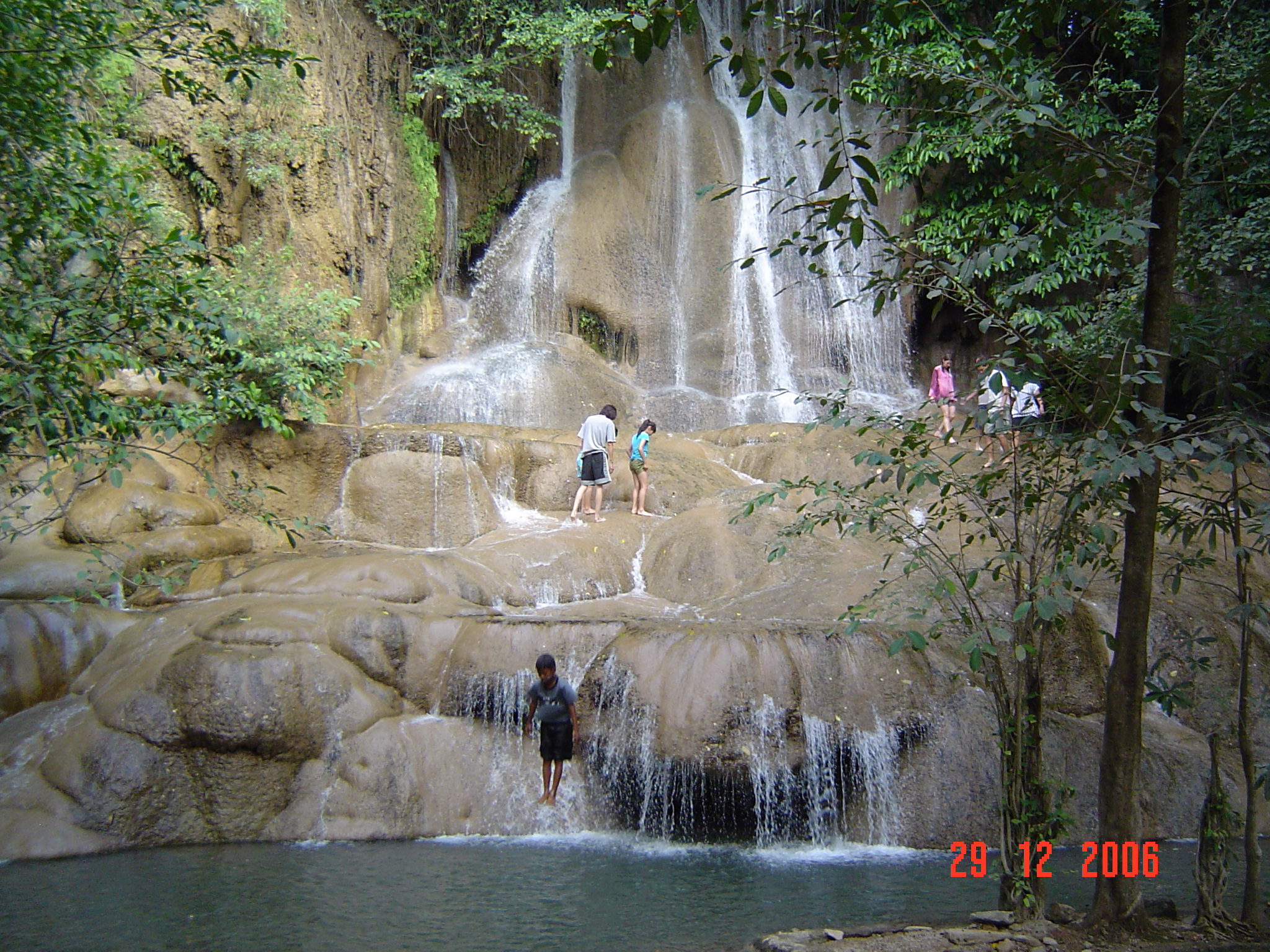
Sai Yok Noi Waterfall, Sai Yok National Park

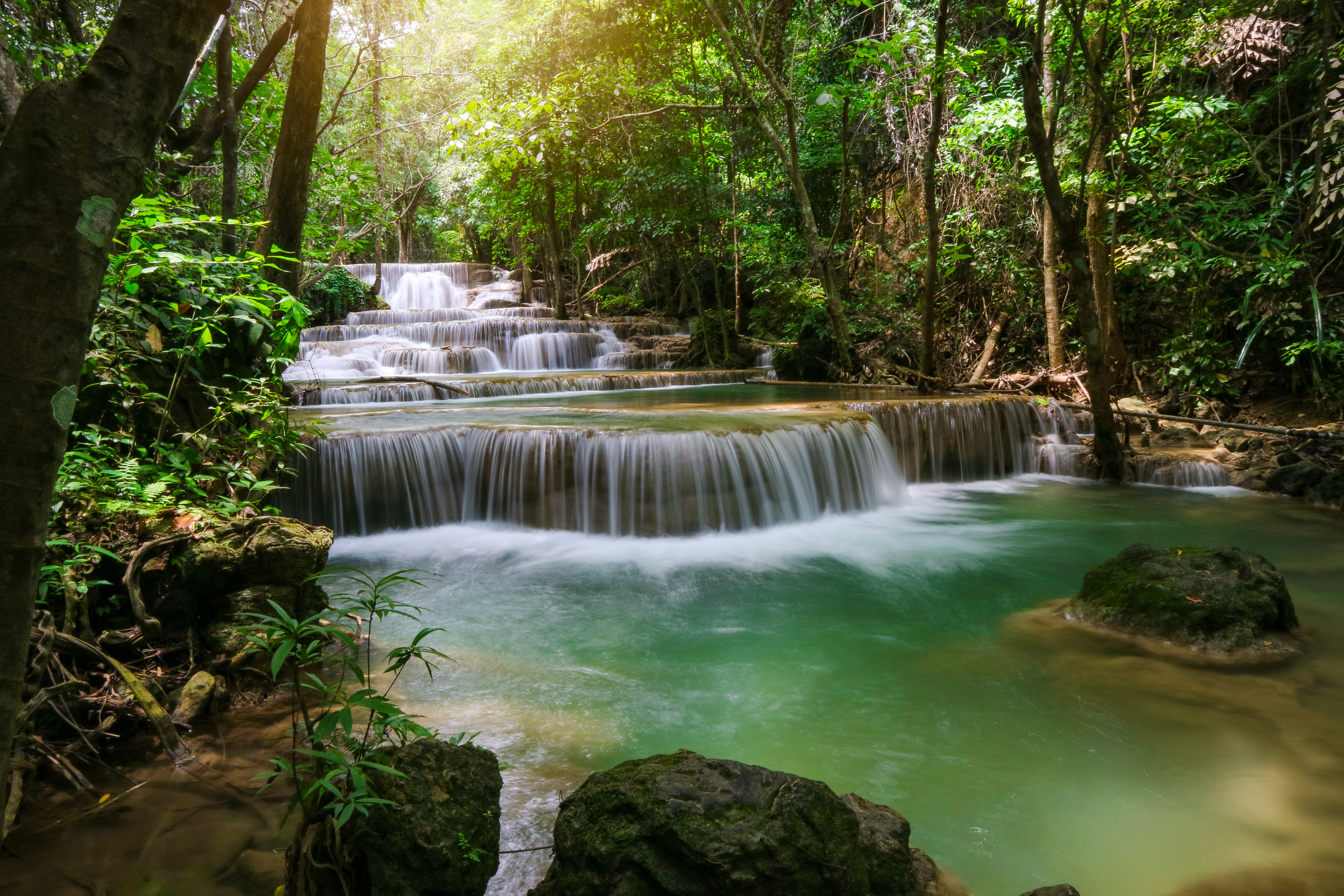
Huai Mae Khamin Waterfall

- Erawan National Park is a 550 square kilometres (210 sq mi) national park in western Thailand in the Tenasserim Hills of Sai Yok and Si Sawat districts of Kanchanaburi province. Founded in 1975, it was Thailand's 12th national park. The major attraction of the park is Erawan Falls, a waterfall named after the Erawan, the three-headed white elephant of Hindu mythology. The waterfalls have seven tiers, and the water flows out of three spouts. Theses spouts resemble the three heads of Erawan. There are four caves in the park: Mi, Rua, Wang Bahdan, and Phra That. Rising northeast of the waterfall area there is a breast-shaped hill named Khao Nom Nang.
- Thong Pha Phum National Park is a 1,236 square kilometres (477 sq mi) national park. The park has numerous waterfalls and caves. Chok Kradin waterfall descends 30 metres (100 ft) over a cliff. Another large waterfall is Khao Yai, with three levels. Other park waterfalls include Dip Yai, Bi Teng and Huai Meuang. Khao Noi cave houses Buddha images. Khao Khat viewpoint offers a panoramic view over the park.
- Khao Laem National Park is a national park of about 1,500 square kilometres (580 sq mi) in western Thailand, located in the northern area of the Tenasserim Hills, Kanchanaburi province. It is a part of the Western Forest Complex, a system of protected wilderness in the Dawna–Tenasserim Hills area of western Thailand. The park surrounds the Khao Laem Reservoir, with a water surface of 388 sq km (150 sq mi) in Kanchanaburi province about 340 km northwest of Bangkok. It is bisected by Road 323. The vegetation consists of mainly mixed deciduous and hill evergreen and dry evergreen forest. It is adjacent to the Thungyai Naresuan Wildlife Sanctuary, which is situated to the northeast of Khao Laem National Park.
- Sai Yok National Park is a 500 square kilometres (190 sq mi) national park in Sai Yok District. The park, home to mountains, waterfalls and caves, is part of the Western Forest Complex protected area. The park's major attractions are its waterfalls, including Sai Yok Yai waterfall which flows into the Khwae Noi river. Sai Yok Yai Lek waterfall lies south of Sai Yok Yai along the Khwae Noi. The park also contains numerous caves, the largest of which is Tham Lawa with a length of 500 metres (1,600 ft). This cave complex consists of five large caverns, each containing large stalactites and stalagmites. Another cave system, Tham Dao Wadueng, is 100 metres (330 ft) long and was discovered in 1972. Tham Daowadung consists of eight chambers of stalactites and stalagmites.
- Khuean Srinagarindra National Park is a national park of about 1,532 square kilometres (592 sq mi). It covers the area of districts Sai Yok, Si Sawat, Thong Pha Phum, and part of Srinagarind Dam, hence the name. Its territory adjacent to the area of Sai Yok National Park, Erawan National Park, Thung Yai Naresuan Wildlife Sanctuary, and Salak Phra Wildlife Sanctuary. The park highlights include Srinagarind Reservoir and several beautiful waterfalls, such as Huai Mae Khamin Waterfall.

== Human achievement index 2022 ==
Health	Education	Employment	Income
23	69	24	49
Housing	Family	Transport	Participation
4	61	56	43
Province Kanchanaburi, with an HAI 2022 value of 0.6372 is "average", occupies place 43 in the ranking.

Since 2003, United Nations Development Programme (UNDP) in Thailand has tracked progress on human development at sub-national level using the Human achievement index (HAI), a composite index covering all the eight key areas of human development. National Economic and Social Development Board (NESDB) has taken over this task since 2017.

Rank	Classification
1 - 13	"high"
14 - 29	"somewhat high"
30 - 45	"average"
46 - 61	"somewhat low"
62 - 77	"low"

Map with provinces and HAI 2022 rankings

== Notable people ==
- Boonpong Sirivejjabhandu (1906–1982), merchant
- Vajirañāṇasaṃvara (1913–2013), 19th Supreme Patriarch of Thailand
- Prawase Wasi (born 1931), haematologist, political actor and public intellectual
- Luang Por Dattajivo (born 1940), Buddhist monk
- Chatchai Plengpanich (born 1960), actor
- Sontirat Sontijirawong (born 1960), politician
- Suchao Nuchnum (born 1983), football player
- Weluree Ditsayabut (born 1992), Miss Universe Thailand 2014
- Poon Mitpakdee (born 1999), actor
