= JEATH War Museum =

War museum in Thailand about the Death Railway

- พิพิธภัณฑ์อักษะเชลยศึก
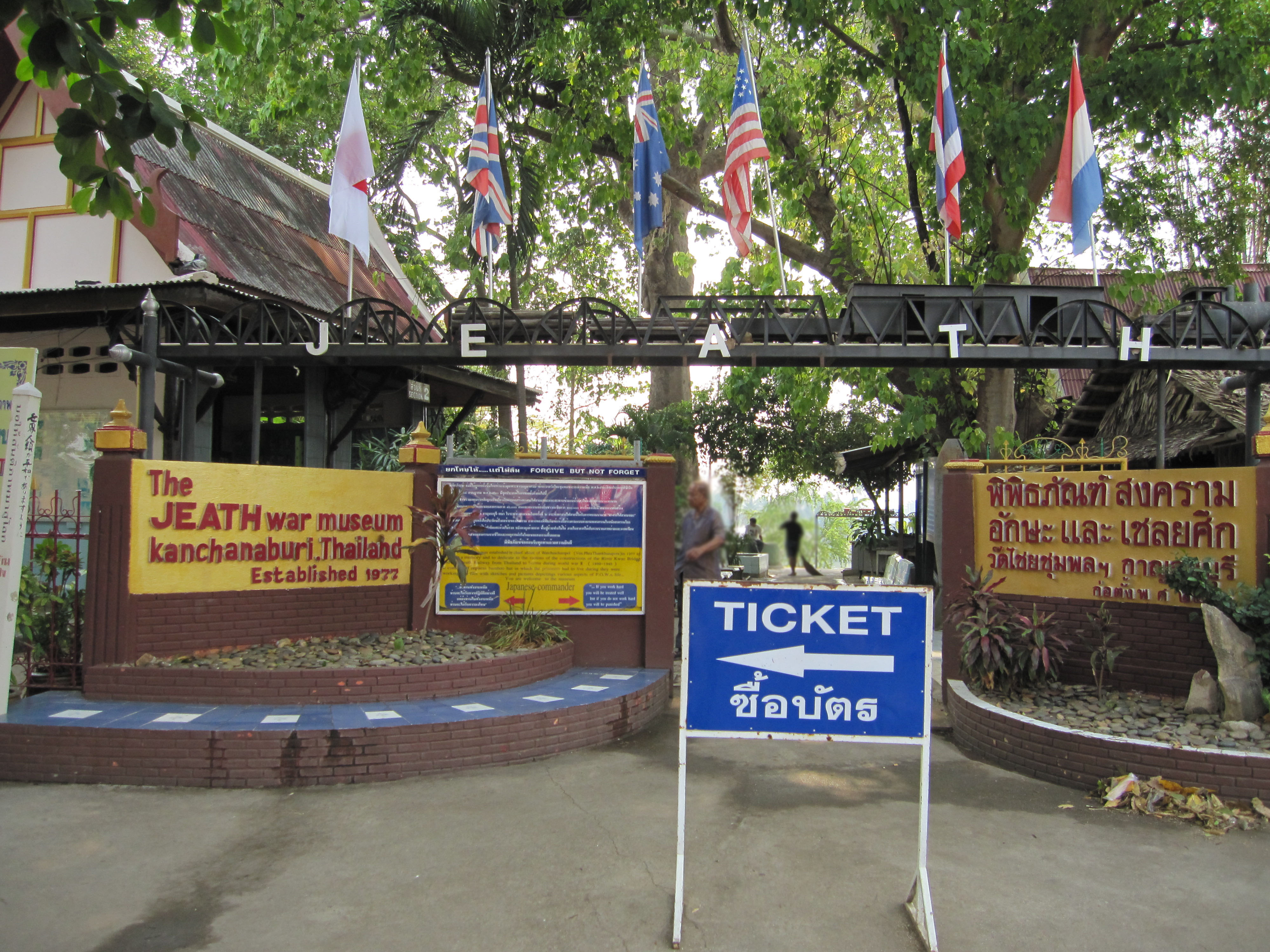
- Established: 1977
- Location: Kanchanaburi, Thailand
- Coordinates: 14°0′58.32″N 99°31′50.16″E

The JEATH War Museum (Thai: พิพิธภัณฑ์อักษะเชลยศึก) are two war museums in Kanchanaburi, Thailand about the Death Railway, which was built from 1942 to 1943 by Allied POWs under the direction of the Japanese as part of the Thai-Burma railways. The older JEATH museum is located in the CBD area of Kanchanaburi, while the other is located near the Bridge over the River Kwai.

== Name ==
The acronym JEATH stands for the primary nationalities involved in the construction of the railway: Japanese, English, Australian, American, Thai and Dutch, whereas the Thai name is Phíphítháphan Songkhram Wát Tâi (Wat Tai War Museum).

== Founding ==
The museum was founded in 1977 by the chief abbot of Wat Chaichumpol Venerable Phra Theppanyasuthee. It is located on the grounds of a temple at the junction of the Khwae Yai and Khwae Noi rivers in Kanchanaburi and it is a part of the famous The Bridge over the River Kwai saga.

== The museum ==
The museum is divided into two sections, one depicting the construction of the Death Railway which is meant to recreate the quarters used by Allied POWs, and the other consisting of reconstructed bamboo huts containing such items as paintings, drawings and photos of and by former prisoners, weapons, tools, and maps.

Tourist photos are not permitted in Section I of the museum.

== Gallery ==
Name sign at the front of the museum

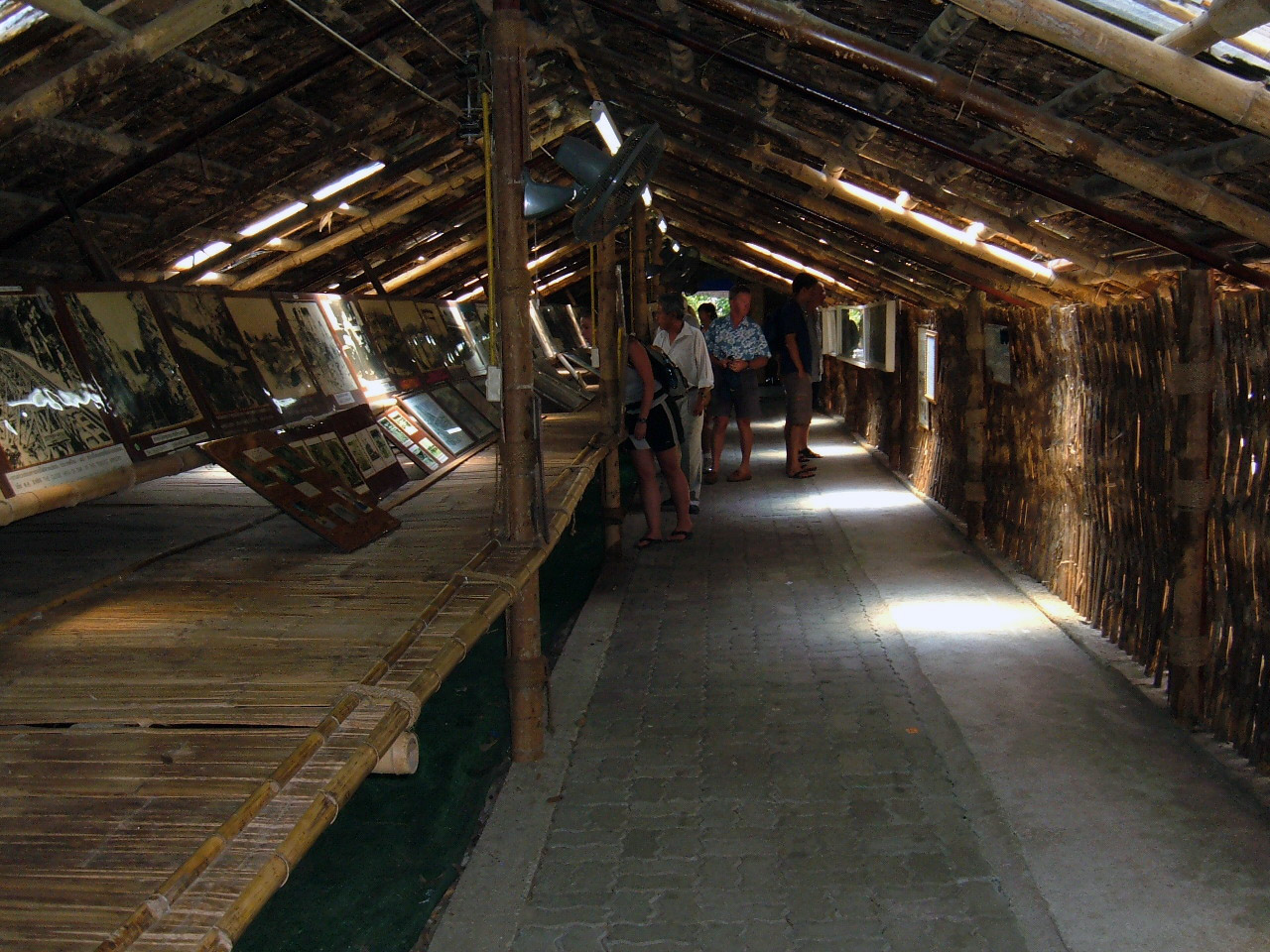
Section of the museum narrating the construction of the Death Railway

A military exhibit at the museum

== See also ==
- Kanchanaburi War Cemetery
- Thailand–Burma Railway Centre
- Thanbyuzayat War Cemetery in Myanmar
