= Thailand–Burma Railway Centre =

Museum and research centre in Kanchanaburi, Thailand

- พิพิธภัณฑ์ทางรถไฟไทย-พม่า
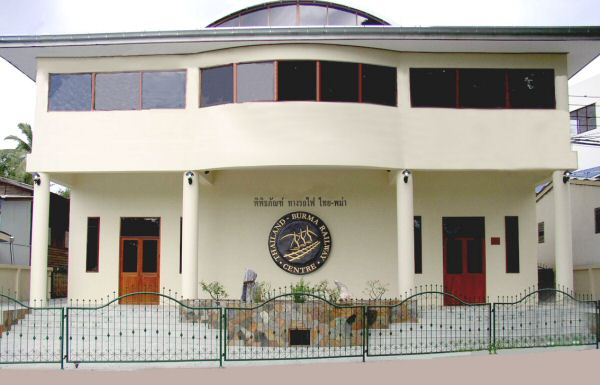
- Thailand-Burma Railway Centre from Jaokannun Road
- Coordinates: 14.0323°N 99.5248°E
- Founder: Rod Beattie
- Website: www.tbrconline.com

The Thailand–Burma Railway Centre (Thai: พิพิธภัณฑ์ทางรถไฟไทย-พม่า) is a museum and research centre in Kanchanaburi, Thailand. It is privately funded and run by Rod Beattie, an Australian who is an expert in the history of the Thailand–Burma Railway. The centre is located to the west of the Kanchanaburi War Cemetery, and is housed in the former headquarters of the Imperial Japanese Army which was constructed by prisoners of war and Asian forced labourers.

== History ==
Rod Beattie is the museum's curator and is originally from Queensland, Australia, but has spent at least a decade living in Kanchanburi and uncovering abandoned sections of the railway.

== Layout ==
At the start of the museum is the introduction area located under a mockup of a wooden bridge constructed with the same techniques that were used to creat bridges on the Burma railway. The area describes the Japanese invasion of Southeast Asia and the transportation of POWs to Burma and Thailand. The end of the area is a mockup of a boxcar used to transport POWs. Through the boxcar is the area that describes the planning, construction and logistics of building the railway and contains relics of tools used to build the railway recovered from the late 1990s. Subsequent sections of the museum describes the geography, living conditions, deaths and the end of the railway.

== Gallery ==
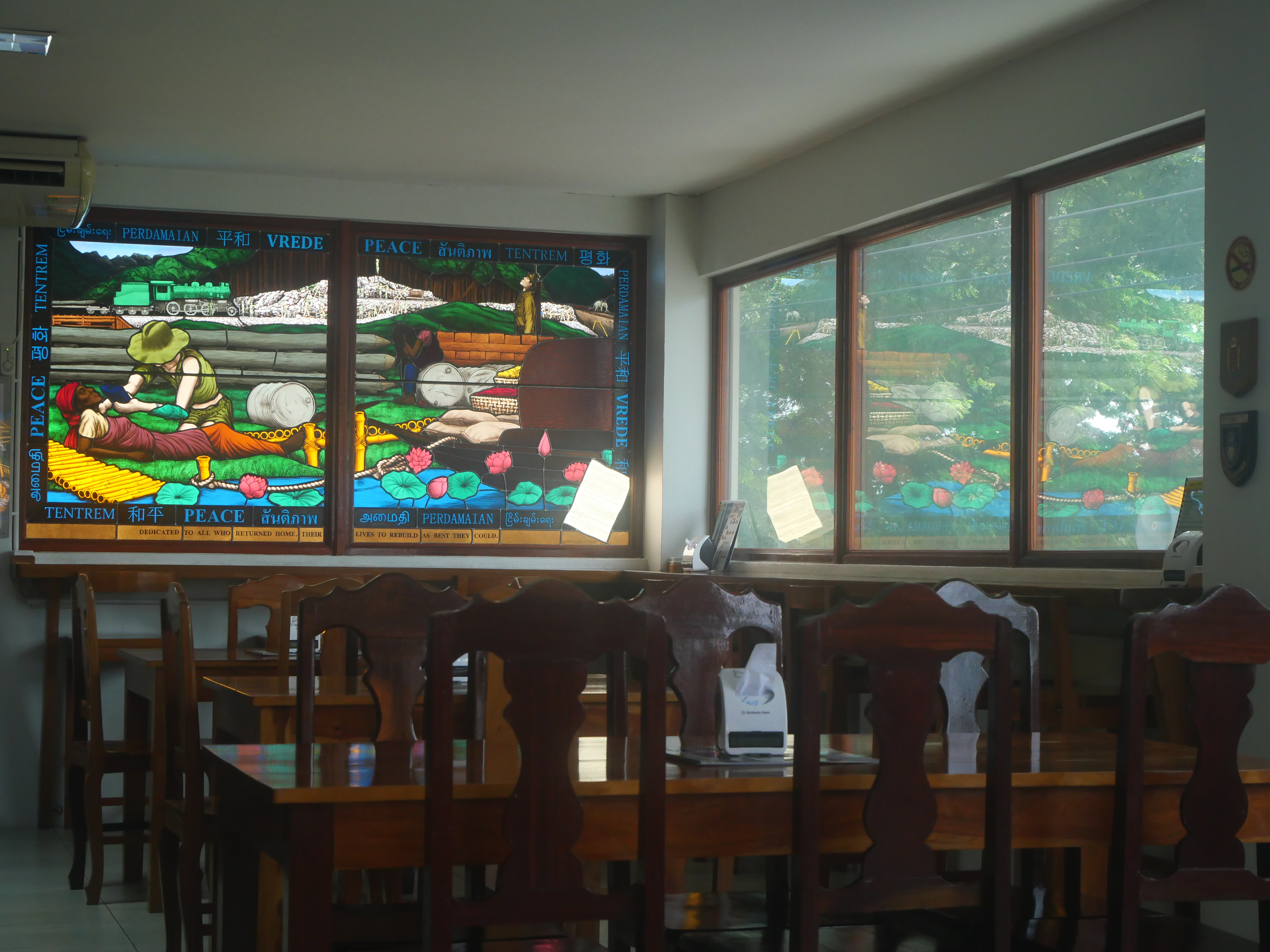
Mosaic in the cafe

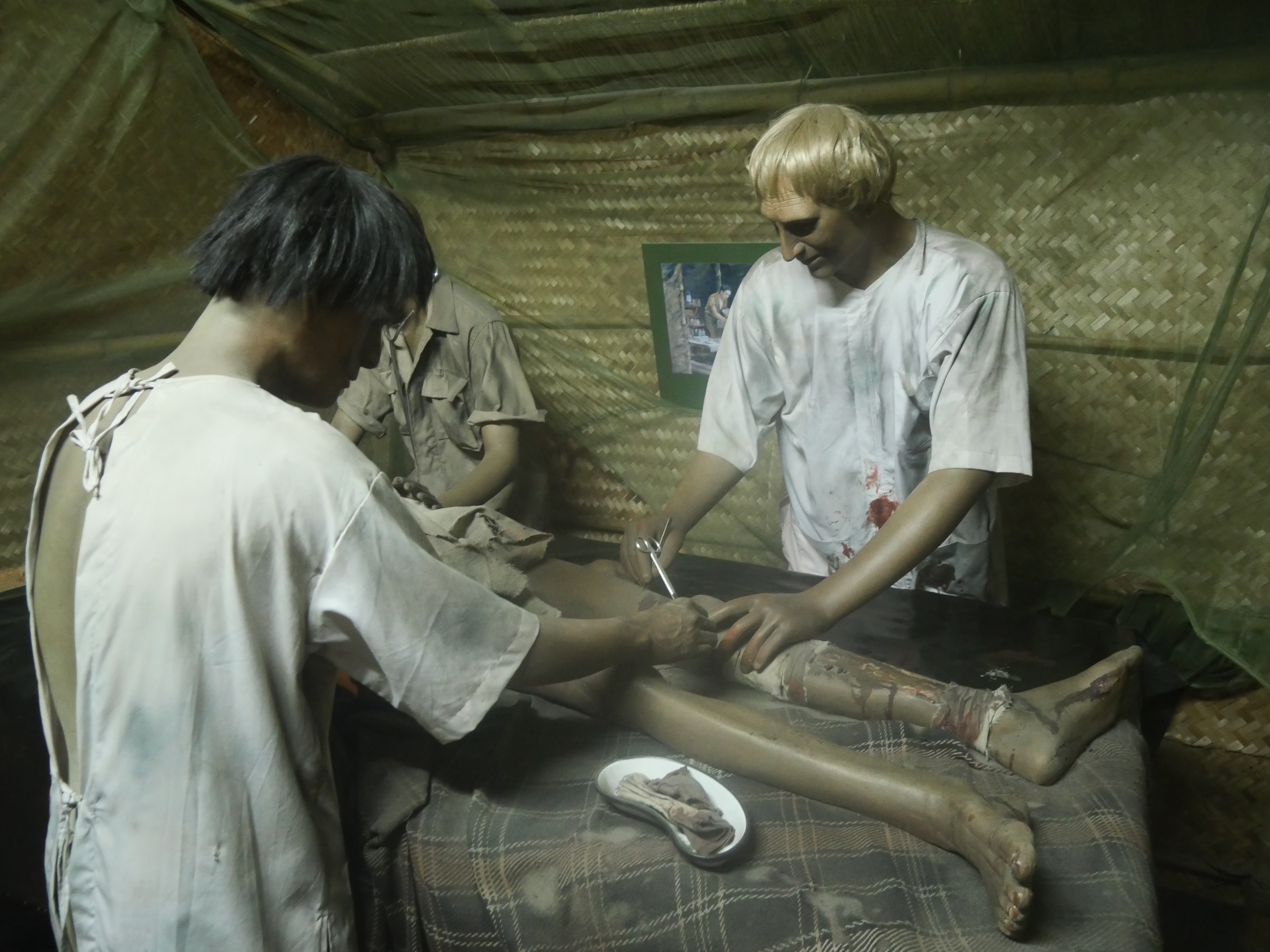
Medical scene

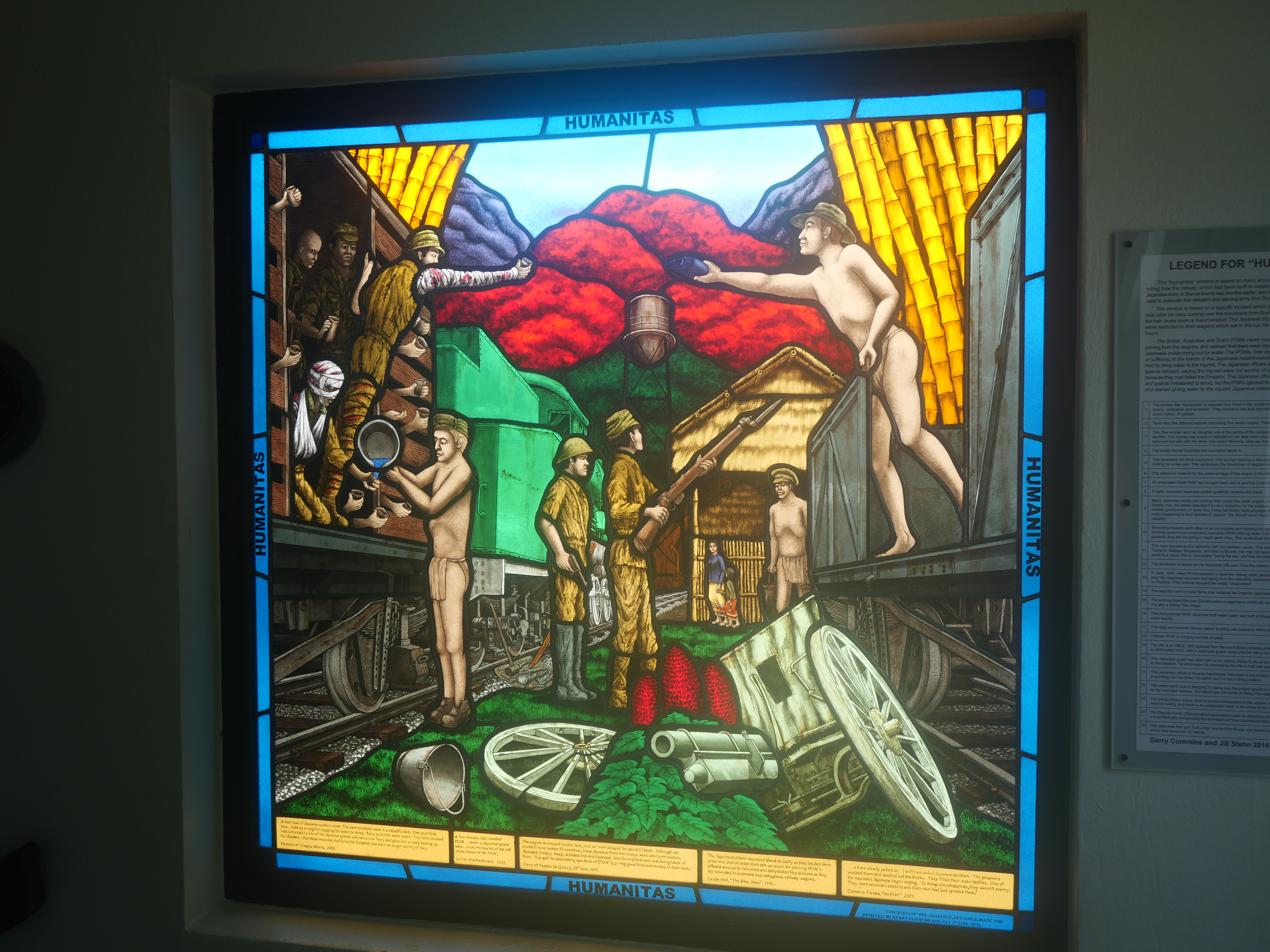
Humanitas mosaic

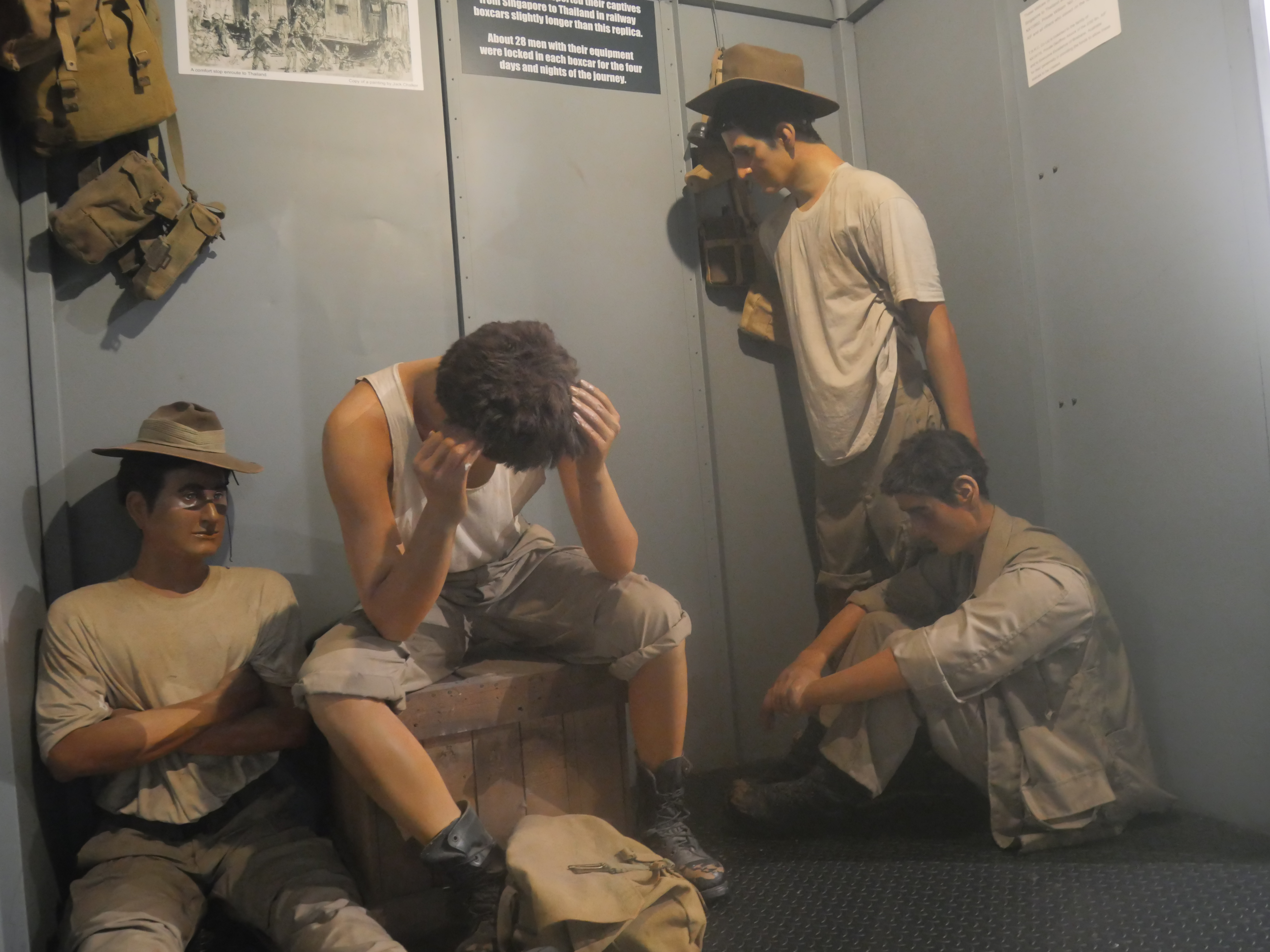
Boxcar with POWs

== See also ==
- Kanchanaburi War Cemetery
- JEATH War Museum
