= Colin St Clair Oakes =

British architect

Colin St Clair Oakes MBE
- Born: Colin St Clair Oakes; 23 May 1908; Llansannan, Wales,
- Died: 12 December 1971 (aged 63)
- Occupation: Architect
- Spouse: Nancy Lea (1913–1973)
- Children: Michael Oakes (b. 1939); Sally Thomas (b. 1941); Valerie Secretan (b. 1947); Bill Oakes (b. 1949)
- Awards: MBE (1944)

Colin St Clair Oakes MBE ARIBA (23 May 1908 – 12 December 1971) was a British architect. He was a Principal Architect for the Imperial War Graves Commission (now Commonwealth War Graves Commission) responsible for many of the war cemeteries and memorials in Asia after the second world war. Notable amongst these are Kranji War Cemetery and Memorial in Singapore, Sai Wan War Cemetery in Hong Kong, and Kohima War Cemetery in Nagaland, India.

== Early life ==
Oakes was born in the village of Llansannan in North Wales, the second child of Leonard George Rycroft Oakes (1879–1969) and Mary St. Claire (1872–1957), a sister Elaine born two years prior. His father Leonard was an architect who worked for the Middlesex County Architects Department. He completed his early education at the Harrow County School.

In 1927 he enrolled in the architecture programme at the Northern Polytechnic School of Architecture (now London Metropolitan University), then under the direction of British abstract artist and pioneer of Modernism, Cecil Stephenson. Completing his undergraduate training by the end of 1929, Oakes submission for the annual Tite Prize, conducted by the Royal British Institute of Architects, drew an honourable mention.

A keen passion for rugby and horses, Oakes was also an active member of the Territorial Army, a branch of the Royal Engineers.

== Work ==
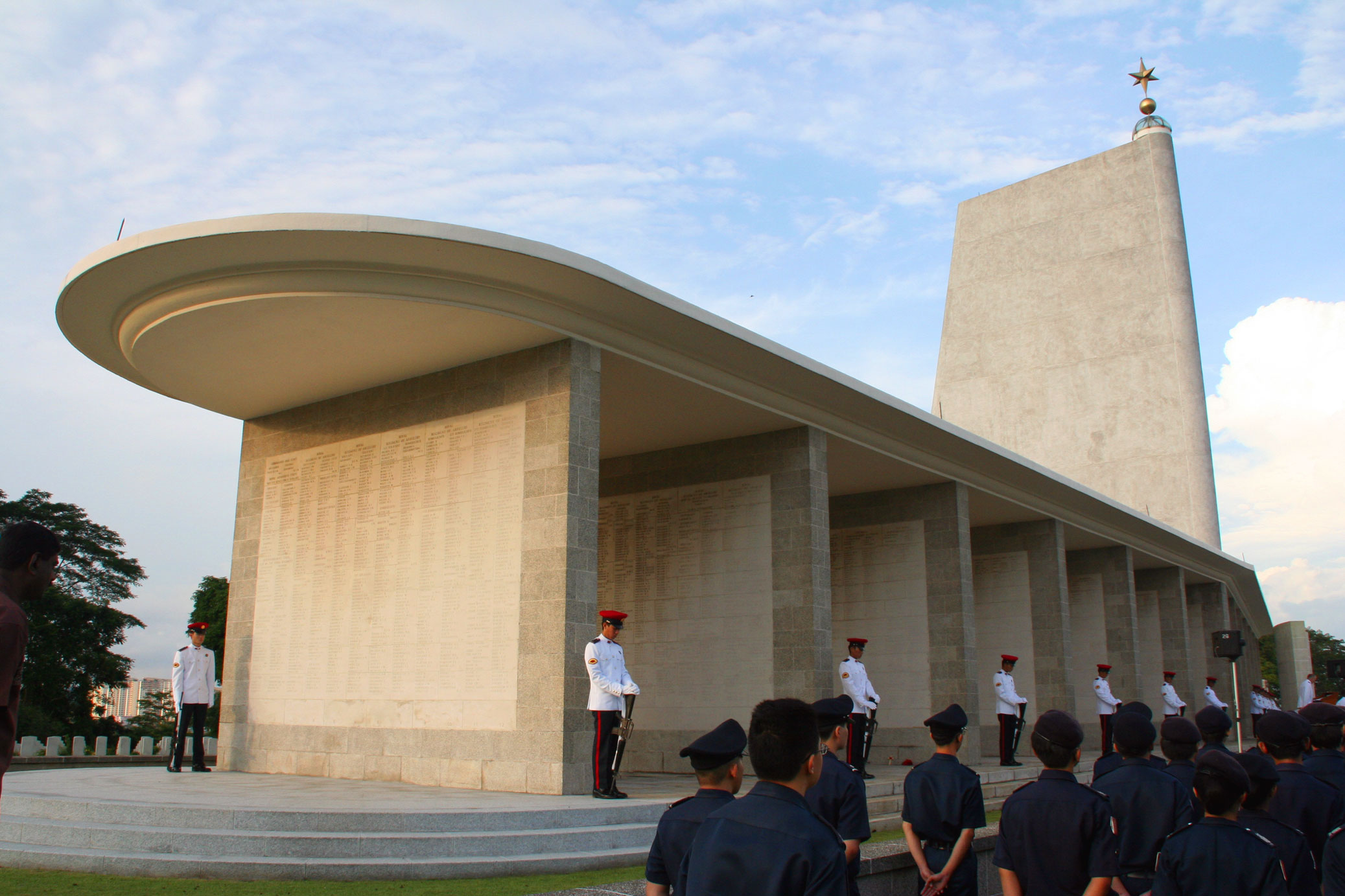
Kranji War Memorial in Singapore

After a short period articled to the London firm of TP Bennett, Oakes departed for Finland in April 1930. There he worked in the Helsinki office of sculptor and architect Jarl Eklund, who was an early proponent of Nordic classicism. A young Eero Saarinen, son of Eliel Saarinen would join the same office a few years later.

Back in the UK, Oakes enrolled in the Royal Academy of Arts at the beginning of 1931 to again study architecture. It was short-lived, as Oakes would win the prized Rome Scholarship in Architecture which offered a one-year opportunity to live and study at the British School at Rome. Under the stewardship of former student, British archaeologist Ian Richmond, Oakes would thrive in Rome and be granted an extension to his stay for an additional year. It was also at the British School that he would meet and befriend fellow Rome Scholars William Holford (later Lord) and his future wife the painter Marjorie Brooks, along with the sculptors John Kavanagh, Arthur Ayres, Charlotte Gibson, the painters Madeline Robinson, Ian White and fellow architect Robert Pierce Hubbard. An active rugby player, Oakes, along with Holford, would play for Italian clubs Roma, Lazio and Selzione Universitaria.

In 1933, Oakes returned home to a work alongside his father at the Middlesex County Council, whilst also teaching part-time at the Architectural Association. A year later in 1935. he joined the firm of R Furneaux Jordan and Maxwell Allen as their Chief Assistant. That same year he was awarded first honorary mention in the Croydon Civic Centre Competition in collaboration with Maxwell Allen, and received the Arthur Cates prize for his design for The Promotion of Architecture in Relation to Town Planning. He would also have a second picture exhibited at the Royal Academy Exhibition with a cottage at Esher. In Jan 1936 Oakes achieved another first honorary mention with the Southern Rhodesia Houses of Parliament competition, this time in collaboration with Furneaux Jordan.

In the early spring of 1936, Oakes departed for India, having accepted an appointment as Second Architect to the Government of Bengal. Within two months of arriving, he took on the acting Government Architect role, on account of his predecessor taking ill. During his time in Bengal, Oakes actively designed and administered numerous public projects ranging from the expansion of Dum Dum Jail, the Custom House in Calcutta, Technical Colleges in Dacca and Chittagong along with hospital wings, postal and police stations throughout West Bengal. He also contributed to the design of three bridges under construction: Cossye Bridge at Midnapore (Medinipur), Ichapur Khal Bridge (Ishapore) which crosses the Ganges River and the iconic Sevoke-Teesta Bridge (also known as Coronation Bridge) which spans the Teesta River.

During his two years in India, Oakes also joined the Calcutta Light Horse Auxiliary Force.

== War Service ==
With the onset of the second world war, Oakes was promoted to captain and posted to Bengal. As a member of the Royal Artillery, he was attached to the 72nd Indian Infantry Brigade of the 36th Division, under the overall command of the 14th Army, led by Field Marshal William Slim. Initially based in Calcutta, and operating in the North-Western Frontier, Oakes was transferred to Chittagong for the Arakan Campaign. It would take two years of intense fighting in the jungles and mountainous terrain, culminating in the Battle of the Ngakyedauk Pass by 3 May 1944 to stop the march on Delhi by the Japanese. On 9 May, Oakes was recommended for decoration with an MBE for his part in the campaign and promoted to Major.

== Imperial War Graves Commission ==
Oakes returned home in October 1945, to his wife Nancy and two children (with two further children by the end of the 1940s). He would also partner his close friend, colleague from the Architectural Association and fellow war veteran Raymond Gordon Brown in an architectural practise. It would though be short-lived. Within two months, upon the recommendation of Sir Frederic Kenyon, Oakes would take up an appointment as Advisory Architect to the Imperial War Graves Commission. Along with Colonel Harry Naismith Obbard of the IWGC, he was to urgently depart for a prolonged tour of Assam, Eastern Bengal and Burma. They were to visit all the war cemeteries, determine which shall be made permanent and then propose their general layout and architectural treatment. The tour was extended to include Ceylon, Siam (Thailand), the Siam-Burma railway, Malaya and Singapore.

Colin St Clair Oakes would be formally appointed Principal Architect to the Imperial War Graves Commission on 1 March 1947. By this stage he was a partner in the architectural firm Sir Aston Webb & Son. He would join fellow Principal Architects for the second world war, (Sir) Hubert Worthington, (Sir) Edward Maufe, Louis de Soissons and Philip Hepworth. In doing so, Oakes would be the only veteran of the second world war and the youngest at 36 years of age.

Oakes was involved in the design of the following war cemeteries:

- Taiping War Cemetery, Malaysia
- Kranji War Cemetery and Memorial, Singapore
- Imphal Military Cemetery & Imphal Muslim Military Cemetery, India
- Gauhati Military Cemetery, India
- Kohima War Cemetery, India
- Digboi War Cemetery, India
- Chungkai War Cemetery, Thailand
- Kanchanaburi War Cemetery, Thailand
- Taukkyan War Cemetery, Burma
- Rangoon War Cemetery, Burma
- Thanbyuzayat War Cemetery, Burma
- Sai Wan Bay War Cemetery and Memorial, Hong Kong
- Stanley Military Cemetery, Hong Kong

== Later life ==
By the late 1940s, Oakes had relinquished his position with the commission and returned to the Architectural Association as Fifth Form Master, joining his previous partner Gordon Brown.

In July 1949, Oakes took up the appointment of Chief Architect to the Boots Pure Drug Company, succeeding Percy J Bartlett. In his new role, Oakes carried on from Bartlett with the design and rebuilding of a great number of Boots stores that had been destroyed during the war. And over the next seventeen years, he oversaw a modernist architectural program of numerous office buildings, laboratories, retail outlets and factories throughout the United Kingdom.
