= Kranji War Cemetery =

Cemetery in Singapore

- Commonwealth War Graves Commission
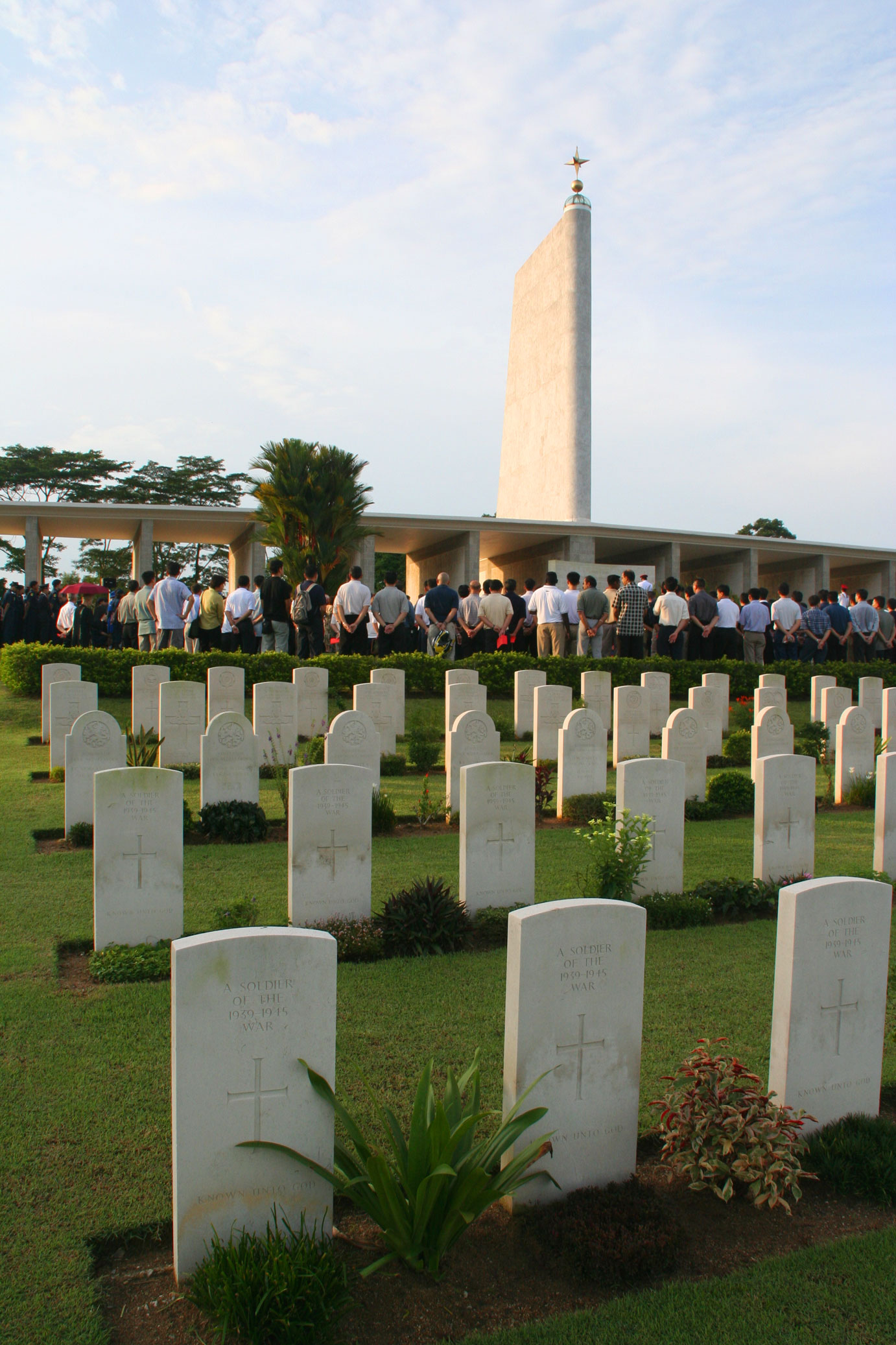
- Used for those deceased 1942–1945
- Established: 1946
- Location: 1°25′11″N 103°45′28″E; Kranji, Singapore
- Designed by: Colin St Clair Oakes
- Total burials: 4,461
- Unknowns: 850

Burials by nation
- Specific figures are not available

Burials by war
- World War I: 64; World War II: 4,394

The Kranji War Cemetery is located in Kranji, Singapore, and is the final resting place for Allied soldiers who perished during the Battle of Singapore and the subsequent Japanese occupation of the island from 1942 to 1945 and in other parts of Southeast Asia during World War II.

There are 4,461 World War II casualties buried or commemorated at this cemetery, of which more than 850 are unidentified. There are 64 World War I headstones, of which three commemorate casualties known to have been buried elsewhere but whose graves could not be found on concentration.

Adjacent to the War Cemetery is the Kranji Military Cemetery, also administered by the Commonwealth War Graves Commission.

== History ==
The Kranji area was previously a military camp. At the time of the Japanese invasion of Malaya, the area was in use as an ammunition magazine. After the fall of Singapore, the Japanese established a prisoner-of-war camp at Kranji and a hospital nearby at Woodlands. After the war, in 1946, it was decided that Kranji would be designated as Singapore's war cemetery so the small cemetery at Kranji was developed into a permanent war cemetery and subsequently war graves from Buona Vista, Changi, and other cemeteries were removed and re-interred at Kranji.

The site was expanded by the concentration of graves from surrounding areas and from Saigon in then-French Indochina (now Ho Chi Minh City in Vietnam).

Colin St Clair Oakes designed the Singapore Memorial and the War Cemetery, and the memorial was unveiled on 2 March 1957 by Sir Robert Black, who was a former a prisoner of war of the Japanese and at the time of the unveiling was then the Governor and Commander-in-Chief, Singapore.

=== Repatriation of Australian war dead ===
On 2 June 2016, the remains of 32 persons interred at Terendak Camp, Malaysia, including several family members, plus one Vietnam War soldier interred at Kranji War Cemetery, were repatriated to Australia, landing at RAAF Base Richmond on two Royal Australian Air Force C-17s. They had been disinterred following agreement between the governments.

== Special memorials ==
Special memorials exist to commemorate specific deaths or graves that could not be found. These memorials are mainly clustered around the main Singapore Memorial.

=== Singapore Memorial ===
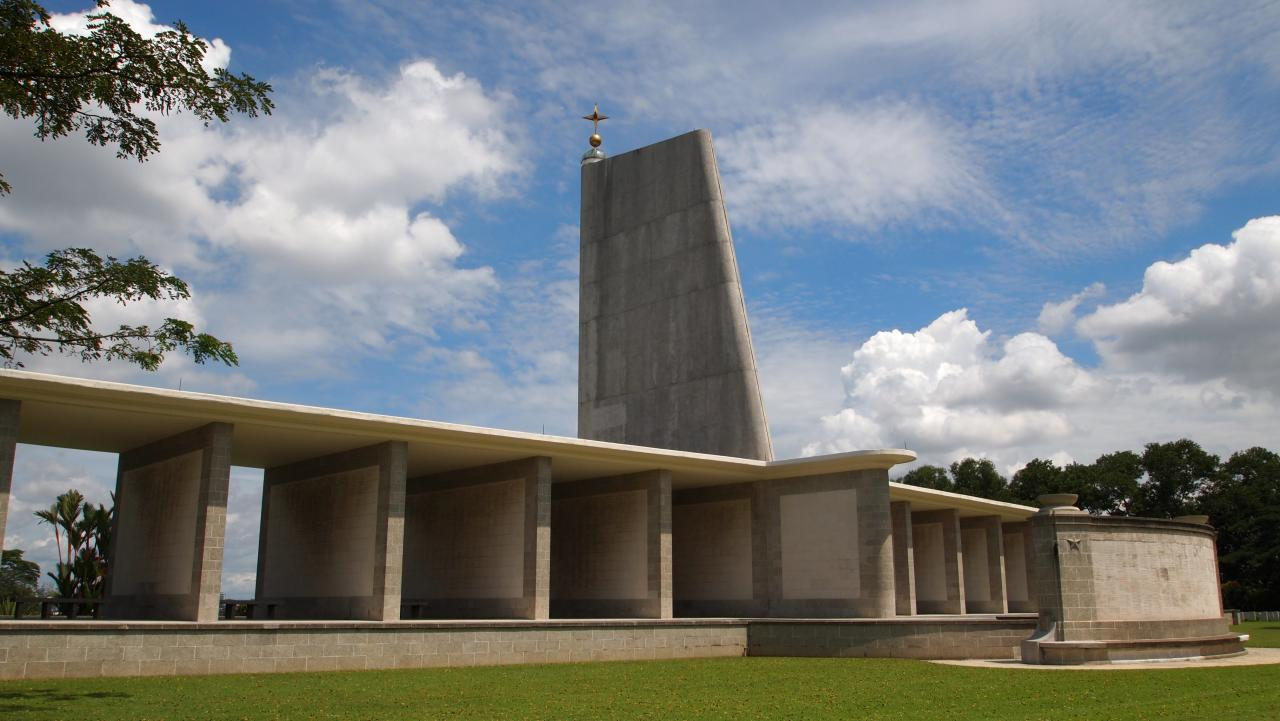
Kranji War Memorial

The Singapore Memorial, known locally as the Kranji War Memorial, stands over the war cemetery with the names of 24,346 Allied soldiers, sailors, and airmen inscribed on its walls. They record those for whom no remains could be identified thus no known grave established.

=== Singapore (Unmaintainable Graves) Memorial ===
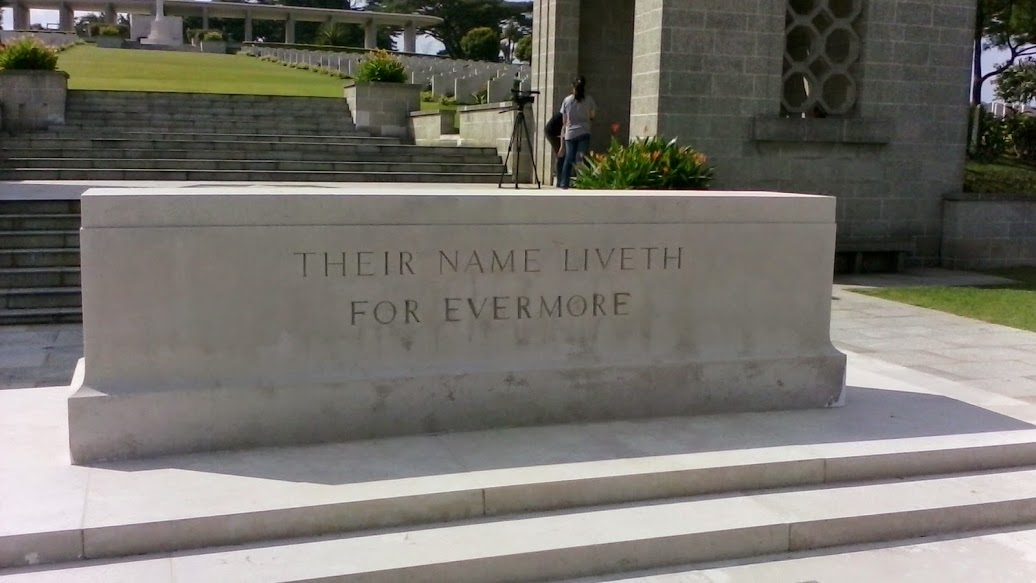
Inscription at Kranji War Cemetery

This memorial commemorates over 250 troops killed in action in British Malaya whose graves, whilst known, the Commonwealth War Graves Commission were unable to maintain and whose bodies could not be moved due to religious conviction.

=== Singapore Cremation Memorial ===
This memorial is to almost 800 casualties, mostly from Undivided India, who were cremated as part of their religious beliefs.

=== Singapore Civil Hospital Grave Memorial ===
At the end of the occupation of the island, wounded civilians and servicemen were brought to the hospital in large numbers. Many of these died and a mass grave was established for more than 400 of the bodies. After the war, rather than disturb the grave in a largely futile attempt to identify any single casualties, a cross was built over the grave and the site was consecrated by the Bishop of Singapore.

=== Chinese Memorial ===
This memorial, located further from the Singapore Memorial, is a mass grave for 69 Chinese servicemen serving with the Commonwealth forces who were killed at the start of the occupation.

== See also ==
- Kranji State Cemetery
