= Imphal War Cemetery =

CWGC cemetery in India

- Commonwealth War Graves Commission
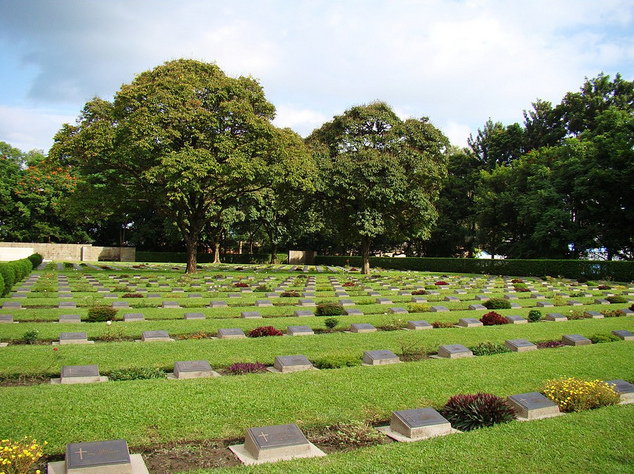
- Used for those deceased
- Location: 24.82247°N 93.94623°E near Imphal, Manipur, India
- Designed by: Colin St Clair Oakes
- Total burials: 1600

Burials by nation
- United Kingdom: 1300; India: 220; Canada: 10; East Africa: 40; Burma: 10; West Africa: 10; Australia: 5

Burials by war
- World War II: 1595

The Imphal War Cemetery is located in Imphal, the capital of the Indian state of Manipur, in Northeast India, which has an international border with upper Burma (now Myanmar). The cemetery has 1,600 Commonwealth burials of the Second World War and is maintained by the Commonwealth War Graves Commission. Many of the people buried in the cemetery were killed during the Battle of Kohima and Imphal.

== Location ==
The cemetery is located in Imphal, in a small locality of Kabo Leikai, Imphal West 10 kilometres (6.2 mi) away from the Imphal International Airport. It is approachable from the Imphal-Dimapur Highway 39, through a branch road which is about 1 kilometre (0.62 mi) to the left of the high way and in front of the DM college. Daily air services operate from Calcutta, Guwahati and Delhi. The road distance from Imphal to Kohima is 135 kilometres (84 mi) to its north and to Silchar is 264 kilometres (164 mi) to its west. Regular buses operate between Guwahati in Assam to Imphal. There is no rail network in Manipur.

== History ==
During the Second World War, in 1942 the Japanese Army occupied Burma by defeating the Commonwealth forces. They then reinforced their strategic strength in Burma and used it as the "staging ground" for attack on Imphal and then Assam with the intention of containing the Chinese air operations across the Himalayas. After the defeat in Burma, the British army divisions had retreated to Imphal in India as it was the easiest route from Burma. Indian diaspora in Burma, of nearly 400,000 people, also fled to India, out of which nearly 140,000 are reported to have reached Assam via Imphal. The British then reinforced the army infrastructure at Imphal by forming the 23rd Indian Division stationed in Manipur, new airfields were built, Commonwealth forces were reinforced with more army and air force units, and a general hospital also started functioning from November 1944. Considering Imphal’s strategic importance, the Japanese forces attacked Manipur in the spring of 1944. The Japanese started bombing Imphal, severed a part of the road link between Imphal and Dimapur and held siege over Imphal for over three months. The 14th Army of the Commonwealth Forces fought fiercely and caused many casualties of the Japanese forces. The siege of Imphal was lifted in the summer of 1944. The battle ended on 22 June 1944 when British and Indian troops from Kohima and Imphal met at Milestone 109. This battle is considered next only to the Battle of Kohima. For the Japanese army the control over Imphal, in the "bloody plains" was very expensive in terms of casualties as nearly 50,000 of their soldiers died here. This battle has been termed as the "Normandy of the east". It is reported that during the Second World War, the number of dead in the Kohima and Imphal sectors in India, put together, was 65,000 Japanese troops and 18,000 British and Indian soldiers.

== Features ==
Initially, the cemetery had 950 burials of war dead. Following the end of the Second World War, the burials in two other smaller cemeteries in Imphal and in other isolated locations were also shifted to this cemetery taking the total war burials at the cemetery to 1,600. The memorial has markers with brass plaques with the name of each of the fallen. The war dead commemorated are from many commonwealth countries, such as 1300 from the United Kingdom, 10 from Canada, 5 from Australia, 1 from New Zealand, 220 from India, 40 from East Africa, 10 from West Africa and 10 from Burma.

Visitor Information Panels have been proposed for display at the memorial. This display, which incorporates a smartphone technology, enables access to information about the battle at Imphal and also personal stories of some of those who are commemorated in the cemetery; 500 such panels were proposed to be installed in 2014.

== Memorial service ==
A memorial service was organized at the cemetery on the occasion of the 70th Anniversary of the Battle of Imphal (WWII) on 27 June 2014. V.K. Duggal, the Governor of Manipur, the Deputy Chief Minister of Manipur, Director, Commonwealth War Grave Commission, the First Secretary, Australian High Commission to India, Military Attache in the Embassy of United States, Chairman and Members of the Manipur Tourism Forum and 2nd World War Imphal Campaign Foundation were the dignitaries present on the occasion. V.K. Duggal and other members placed wreaths on the graves.

== Bibliography ==
- Ahmed, Jaynal Uddin (2010). Development Vision of North-East India. Concept Publishing Company. ISBN 978-81-8069-644-2.
- Sajnani, Manohar (2001). Encyclopaedia of Tourism Resources in India. Gyan Publishing House. ISBN 978-81-7835-017-2.
- Sandham, Oken Jeet (2013). Naga Paddy Man. Booksmango. ISBN 978-616-222-228-3.
- Swedien, Bea Andersen (2011). Under the Red Blanket. Andrews UK Limited. ISBN 978-1-78092-005-4.
