= Thanbyuzayat War Cemetery =

CWGC cemetery in Burma

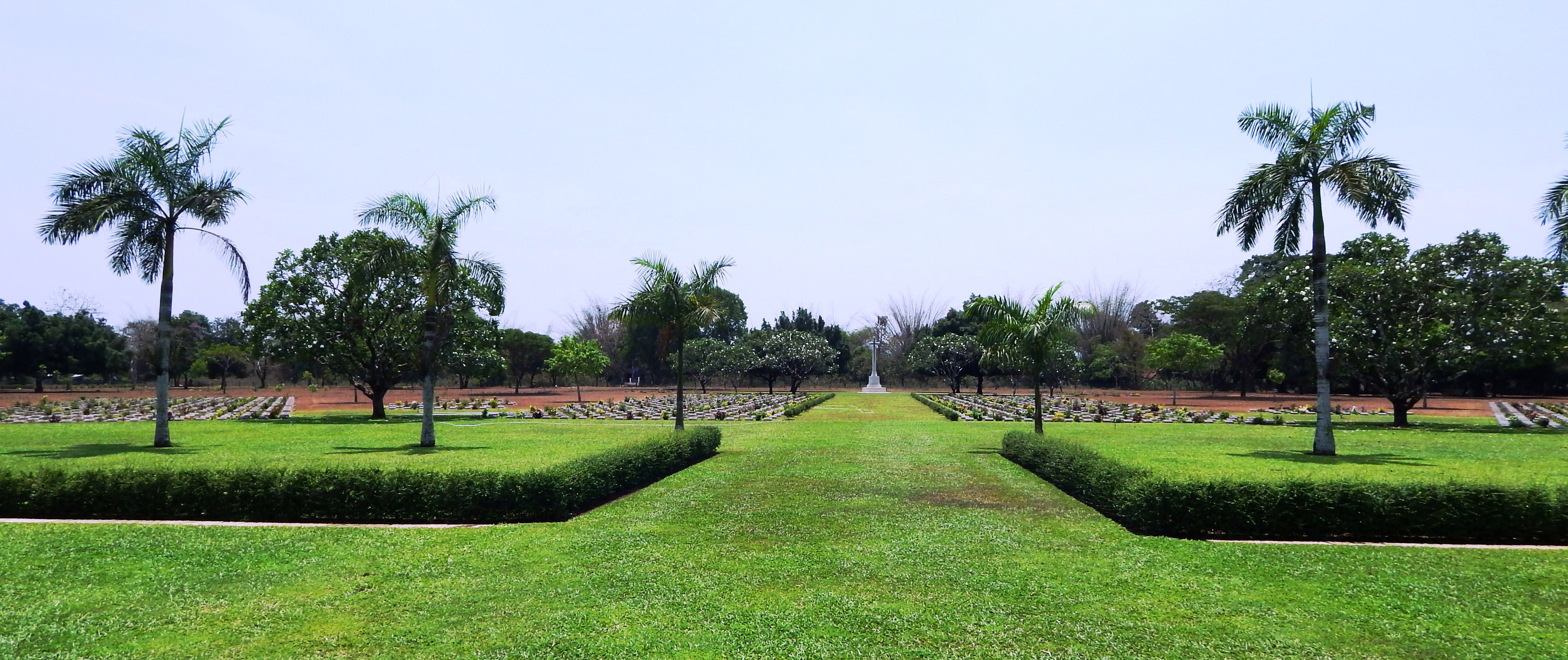
- Interactive map of Thanbyuzayat War Cemetery

Details
- Established: 1946
- Location: Thanbyuzayat
- Country: Burma (Myanmar)
- Coordinates: 15.9727°N 97.7184°E
- Type: Military cemetery
- Owned by: Commonwealth War Graves Commission
- No. of graves: 3,626
- Website: Cemetery details. Commonwealth War Graves Commission.

The Thanbyuzayat War Cemetery (Burmese: သံဖြူဇရပ်စစ်သင်္ချိုင်း) is a prisoner of war cemetery for victims of Japanese imprisonment who died building the Death Railway in Burma. It is at the Burmese end of the Second World War railway construction, in Thanbyuzayat, 65 kilometres south of Mawlamyine (Moulmein). Thanbyuzayat is considered the terminus of the Death Railway, and is where it connected with the Burmese main line (Burma-Siam Railway).

The cemetery was formally inaugurated on 10 December 1946 by General Aung San and Governor Sir Hubert Rance. It is open every day between 07:00–17:00.

== History ==
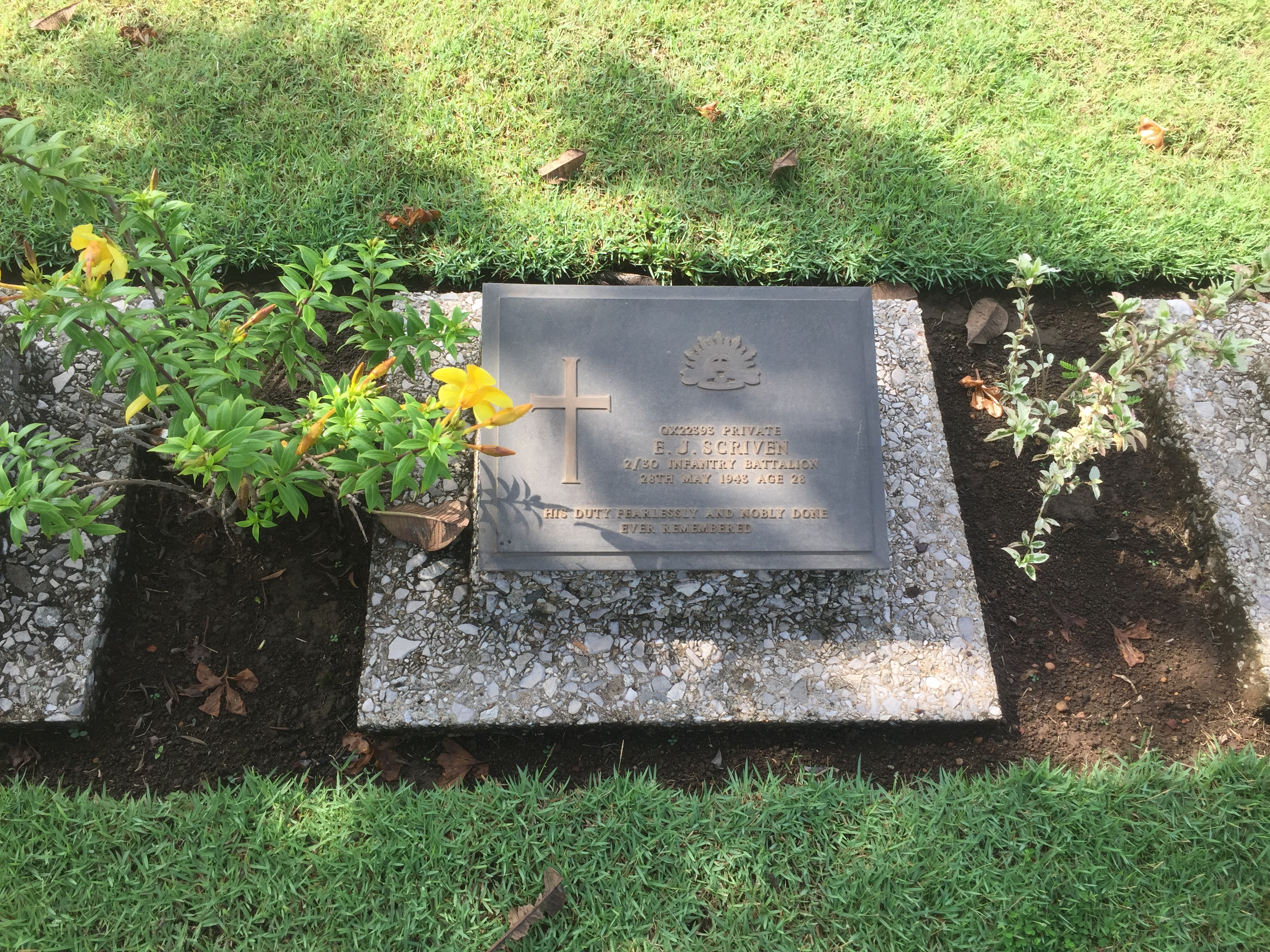
A closer look of a tomb of fallen Allied soldier in WWII in Thanbyuzayat War Cemetery

The Burma-Siam railway, built by Commonwealth, Dutch and American prisoners of war, was a Japanese project driven by the need for improved communications to support the large Japanese army in Burma. During its construction, 12,619 prisoners of war died and were buried along the railway. An estimated 80,000 to 100,000 civilians also died in the course of the project, chiefly forced labour brought from Malaya and the Dutch East Indies, or conscripted in Siam (Thailand) and Burma (Myanmar).

Two labour forces, one based in Siam and the other in Burma worked from opposite ends of the line towards the centre. The Japanese aimed at completing the railway as soon as possible and work began on 16 September 1942. The line, 415 kilometres long, was completed by 25 October 1943.

Thanbyuzayat became a prisoner of war administration headquarters and base camp in September 1942 and in January 1943 a base hospital was organised for the sick. The camp was close to a railway marshalling yard and workshops, and heavy casualties were sustained among the prisoners during Allied bombing raids in March and June 1943. The camp was then evacuated and the prisoners, including the sick, were marched to camps further along the line where camp hospitals were set up. For some time, however, Thanbyuzayat continued to be used as a reception centre for the groups of prisoners arriving at frequent intervals to reinforce the parties working on the line up to the Burma-Siam border.

The graves of those who died during the construction and maintenance of the Burma-Siam railway (except for the Americans, whose remains were repatriated) were transferred from camp burial grounds and isolated sites along the railway into three cemeteries at Chungkai and Kanchanaburi in Thailand and Thanbyuzayat in Myanmar.

Thanbyuzayat War Cemetery was designed by Colin St Clair Oakes and created by the Army Graves Service who transferred to it all burials along the northern section of the railway, between Moulmein and Nieke. The burials in Thanbyuzayat War Cemetery also include Allied POWs who died of sickness or were executed by the Japanese at Victoria Point Myeik, Dawei and Mawlamyine, between June and September 1942.

There are 3,149 Commonwealth and 621 Dutch burials of the Second World War in the Thanbyuzayat War Cemetery.

== War dead ==
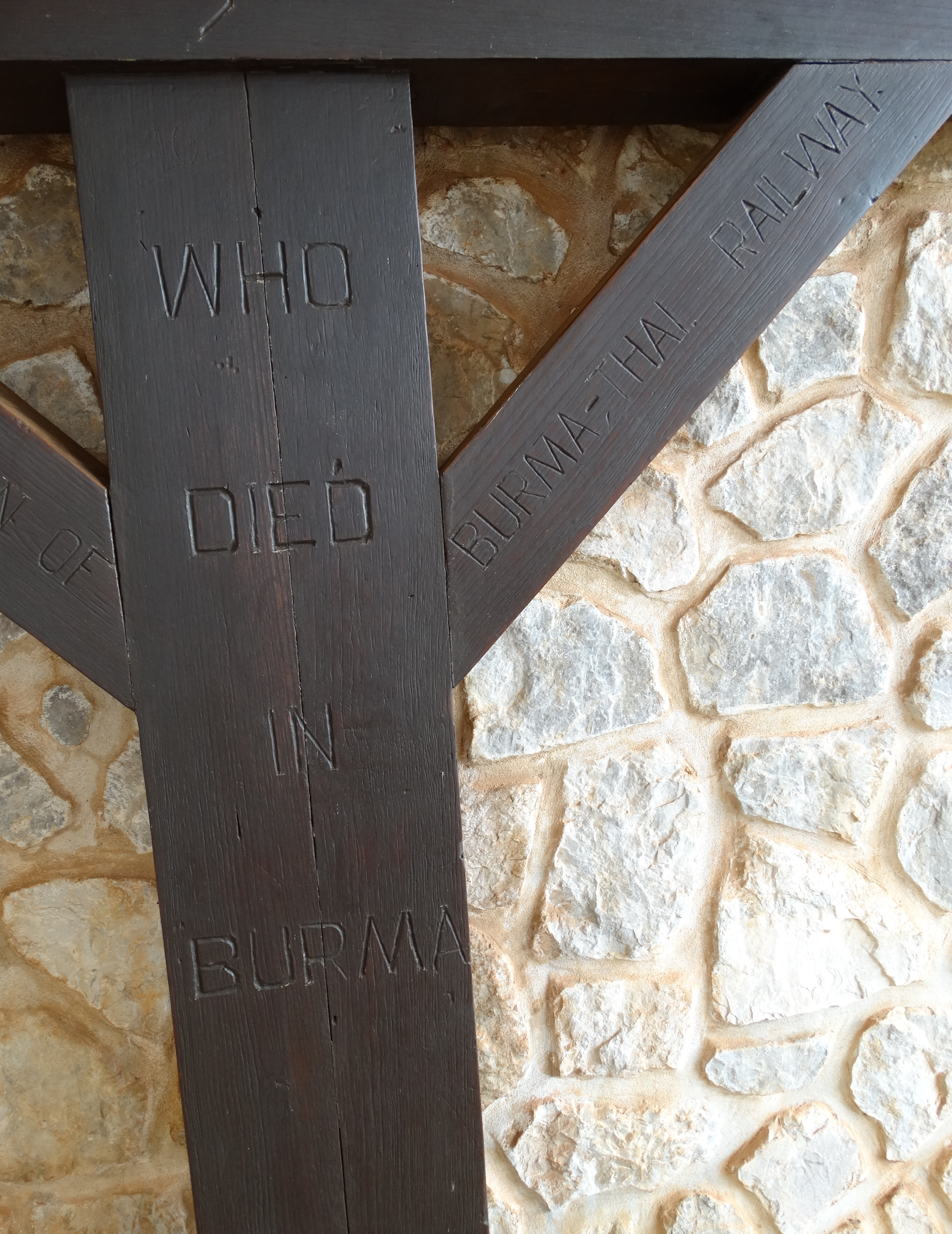
The last remaining original Cross of Sacrifice at Thanbyuzayat War Cemetery

There are 3,626 identified former POWs buried there,

- 1,651 British;
- 1,335 Australians;
- 621 Dutch;
- 15 Indian Army;
- 3 New Zealanders;
- one Canadian.

Also

- 72 unidentified.

== Post-war ==
The local authorities in the district have constructed a small museum as a memorial to the victims of the railway construction.

== See also ==
- Kanchanaburi War Cemetery – in Thailand
- Taukkyan War Cemetery – in Burma
- The Bridge on the River Kwai
