= Kanchanaburi War Cemetery =

CWGC cemetery in Thailand

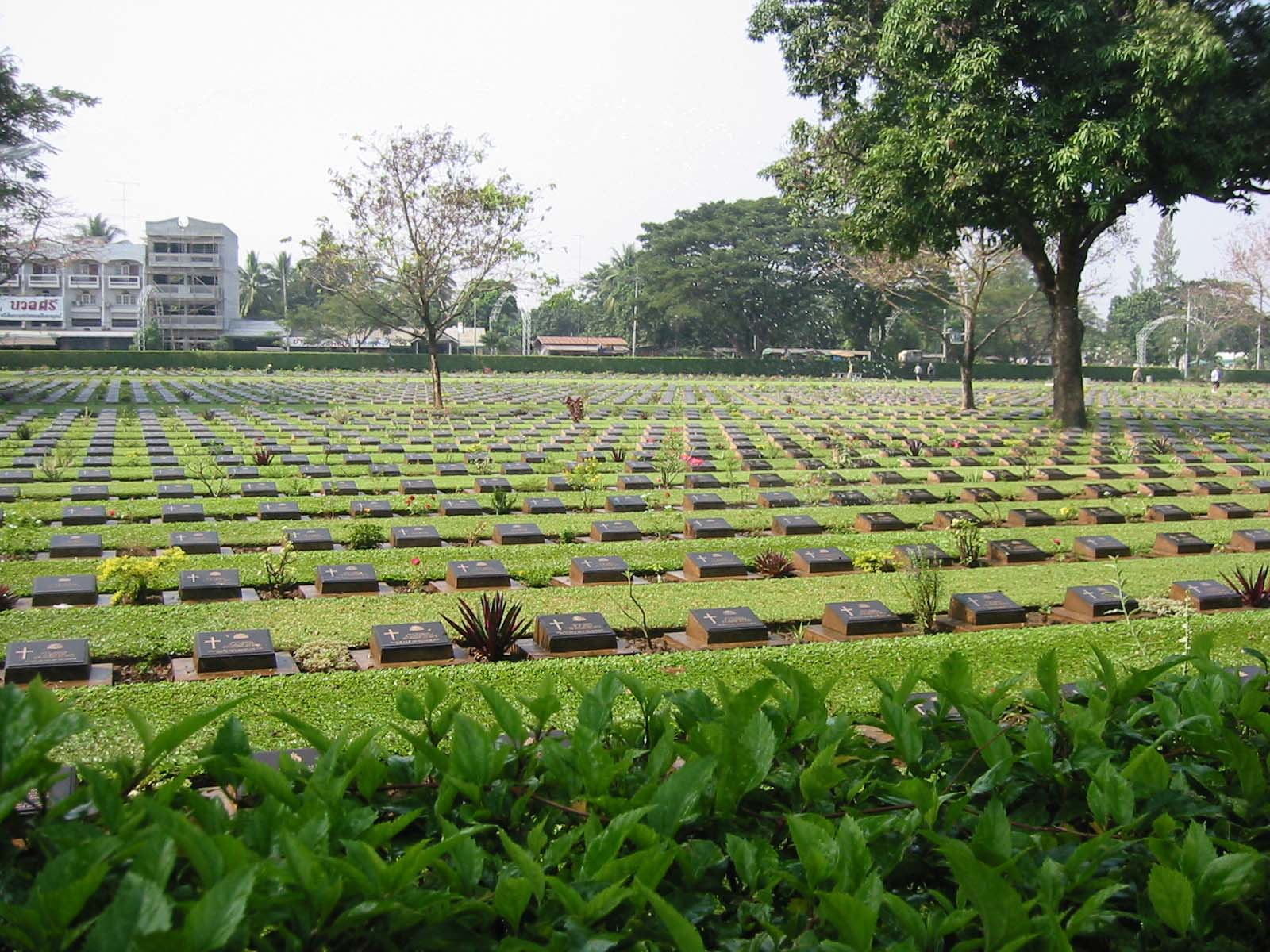
- War graves cemetery
- Interactive map of Kanchanaburi War Cemetery

Details
- Established: In its current form, February 1956
- Location: Kanchanaburi
- Country: Thailand
- Coordinates: 14°1′54″N 99°31′32″E
- Type: Military Cemetery
- Owned by: Commonwealth War Graves Commission
- No. of graves: 6,982
- Website: Cemetery details. Commonwealth War Graves Commission.

The Kanchanaburi War Cemetery (known locally as the Don-Rak War Cemetery) is the main prisoner of war (POW) cemetery for victims of Japanese imprisonment while building the Burma Railway. It is on the main road, Saeng Chuto Road, through the town of Kanchanaburi, Thailand, adjacent to an older Chinese cemetery. The cemetery contains 6,982 graves of British, Australian and Dutch prisoners of war, of whom 6,858 have been identified.

== History ==
The cemetery was designed by Colin St Clair Oakes and is maintained by the Commonwealth War Graves Commission. It is located near the former prisoner of war base camp of Kanchanaburi. There are 6,858 POWs buried there, mostly British, Australian, and Dutch. It contains the remains of prisoners buried beside the south section of the railway from Bangkok to Nieke (Niki Niki), excepting those identified as Americans, whose remains were repatriated.

There are 1,896 Dutch war graves, 5,085 Commonwealth graves and one non-war grave. Two graves contain the ashes of 300 men who were cremated after a cholera outbreak in Niki Niki. The Kanchanaburi Memorial gives the names of 11 from India who are buried in Muslim cemeteries.

Nearby, across a side road, is the Thailand–Burma Railway Centre about the railway and the prisoners who built it. There is also a Dutch Roman Catholic church nearby – Beata Mundi Regina.

== Gallery ==
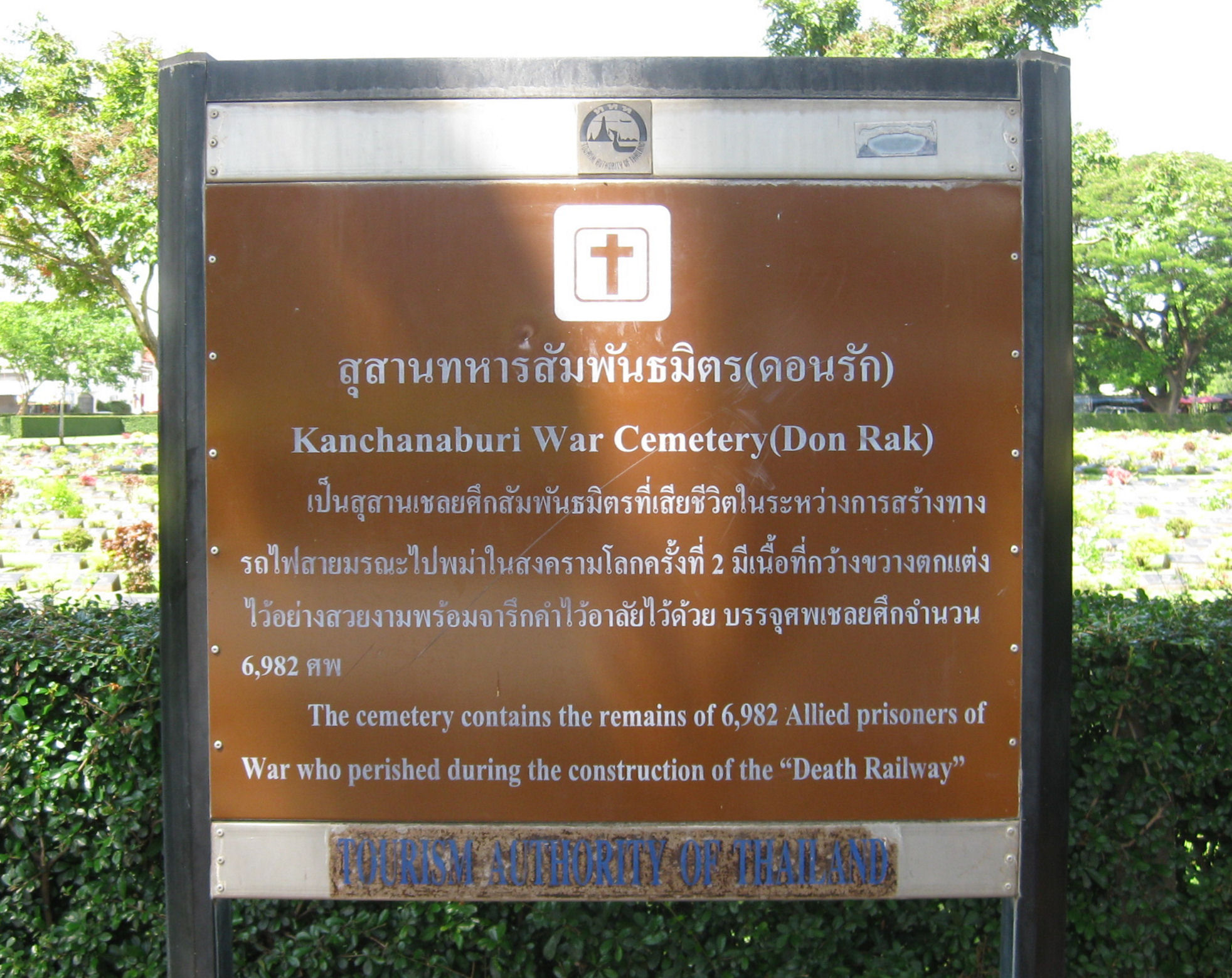
Sign giving both names and number of interments

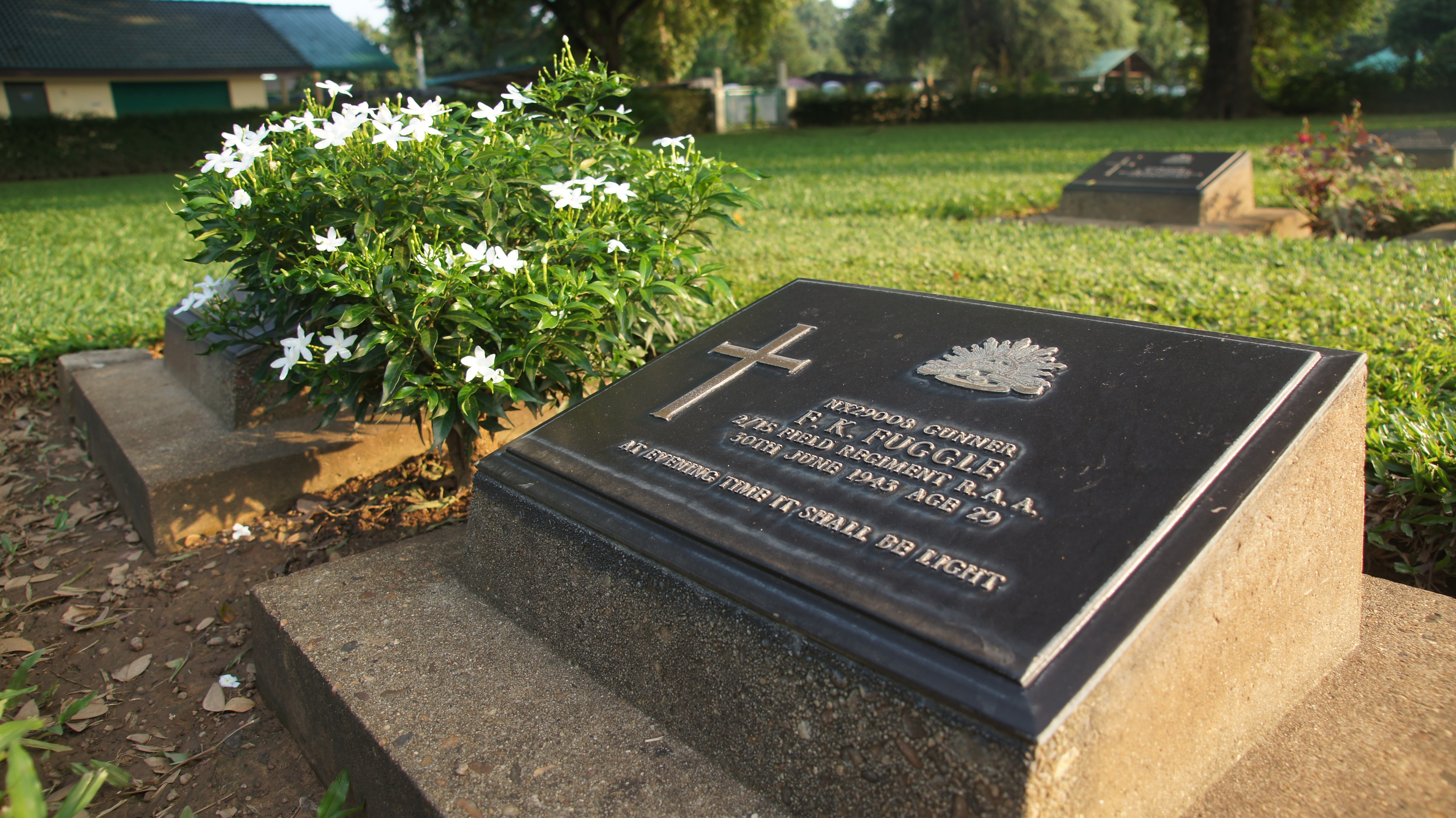
A closer look at the grave of a fallen soldier in the Second World War in Kanchanaburi War Cemetery

== See also ==
- Thanbyuzayat War Cemetery in Burma (Myanmar)
- Chungkai War Cemetery
- JEATH War Museum
- Thailand–Burma Railway Centre
