= Pak Phraek, Kanchanaburi =

Subdistrict of Mueang Kanchanaburi, Thailand

Coordinates: 14.022048°N 99.528125°E

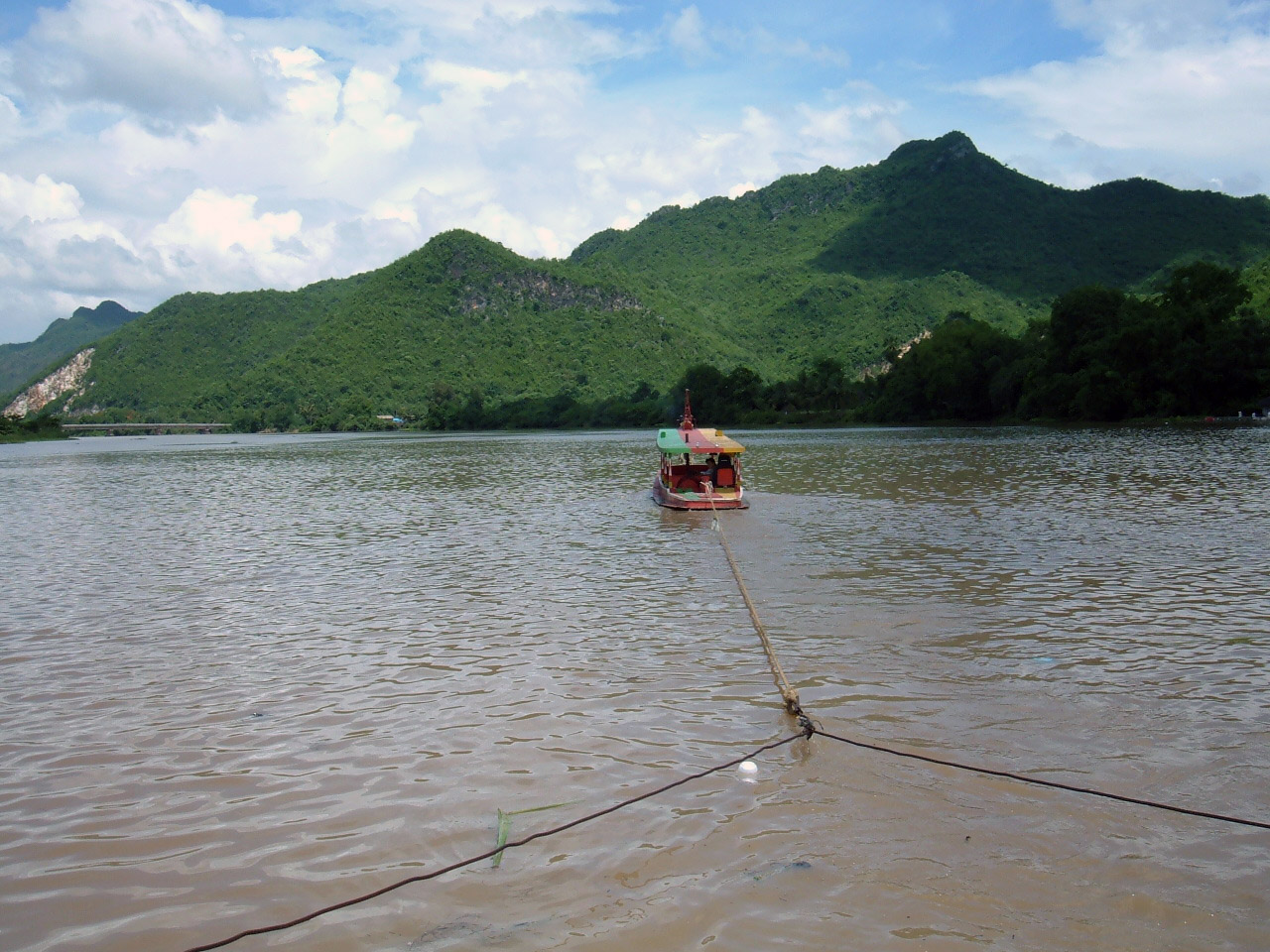
Ban Lin Chang where the Khwae Yai meets the Khwae Noi rivers

Pak Phraek (Thai: ปากแพรก, pronounced [pàːk pʰrɛ̂ːk]) is a tambon (subdistrict) of Mueang Kanchanaburi district, Kanchanaburi province.

== History ==
Pak Phraek, whose name means "confluence" or "water intersection", is the point where the Khwae Yai and the Khwae Noi rivers meet to form the Mae Klong river, which flows southward to the Gulf of Thailand in Samut Songkhram province.

Pak Phraek is a historic site. In 1785 it served as a route for the Burmese army during the Nine Armies' Wars. Later it became the location of Kanchanaburi's old downtown. Chinese and Annamese traders settled here for commerce during the reign of King Rama III around 1831. In modern history the area is also closely tied to World War II. The rise of this riverside commercial district is associated with many national figures, such as Boonpong Sirivejjabhandu, a World War II hero whose house and pharmacy still remain on Pak Phraek Walking Street. This street was also the first concrete road built in Kanchanaburi province.

Today many of the buildings along Pak Phraek Walking Street are preserved as historic structures. They display both Eastern and Western architectural styles, with origins dating back to the reign of King Rama IV.

== Administration ==
Pak Phraek is administered by two government bodies are Kanchanaburi Town Municipality and Pak Phraek Town Municipality.

It is further divided into 13 administrative mubans (villages) and six communities.

No.	Name	Thai
1.	Ban Lin Chang	บ้านลิ้นช้าง
2.	Ban Khao Laem	บ้านเขาแหลม
3.	Ban Thung Na	บ้านทุ่งนา
4.	Ban Wang Saraphi	บ้านวังสารภี
5.	Ban Huan Na	บ้านหัวนา
6.	Ban Pa Yup	บ้านป่ายุบ
7.	Ban Khao Meng Amonmet	บ้านเขาเม็งอมรเมศร์
8.	Ban Huai Nam Sai	บ้านห้วยน้ำใส
9.	Ban Hua Khao	บ้านหัวเขา
10.	Ban Hua Na Lang	บ้านหัวนาล่าง
11.	Ban Prang Nimit	บ้านพรางนิมิต
12.	Ban Lum Dong Krabao	บ้านลุ่มดงกระเบา
13.	Ban Khao Meng Phatthana	บ้านเขาเม็งพัฒนา

The other six communities.

No.	Name	Thai
80.	Chong Charoen	ชุมชนจงเจริญ
81.	Ban Bo	ชุมชนบ้านบ่อ
82.	Wang Yai	ชุมชนวังใหญ่
83.	U Thong	ชุมชนอู่ทอง
84.	Sala Klang	ชุมชนศาลากลาง
85.	Soi Praisanee	ชุมชนซอยไปรษณีย์

== Population ==
As of December 9, 2024, the subdistrict has a total population of 23,904.
