= Barilius signicaudus =

Scientific classification
- Kingdom: Animalia
- Phylum: Chordata
- Class: Actinopterygii
- Order: Cypriniformes
- Family: Danionidae
- Genus: Barilius
- Species: B. signicaudus

Binomial name
- Barilius signicaudus Tejavej, 2012

Species of fish

Barilius signicaudus is a species of fish in the family Cyprinidae. It is found in Khwae Noi River and Khwae Yai River from Mae Klong River.
