= Kanchanaburi =

Kanchanaburi กาญจนบุรี
- Town
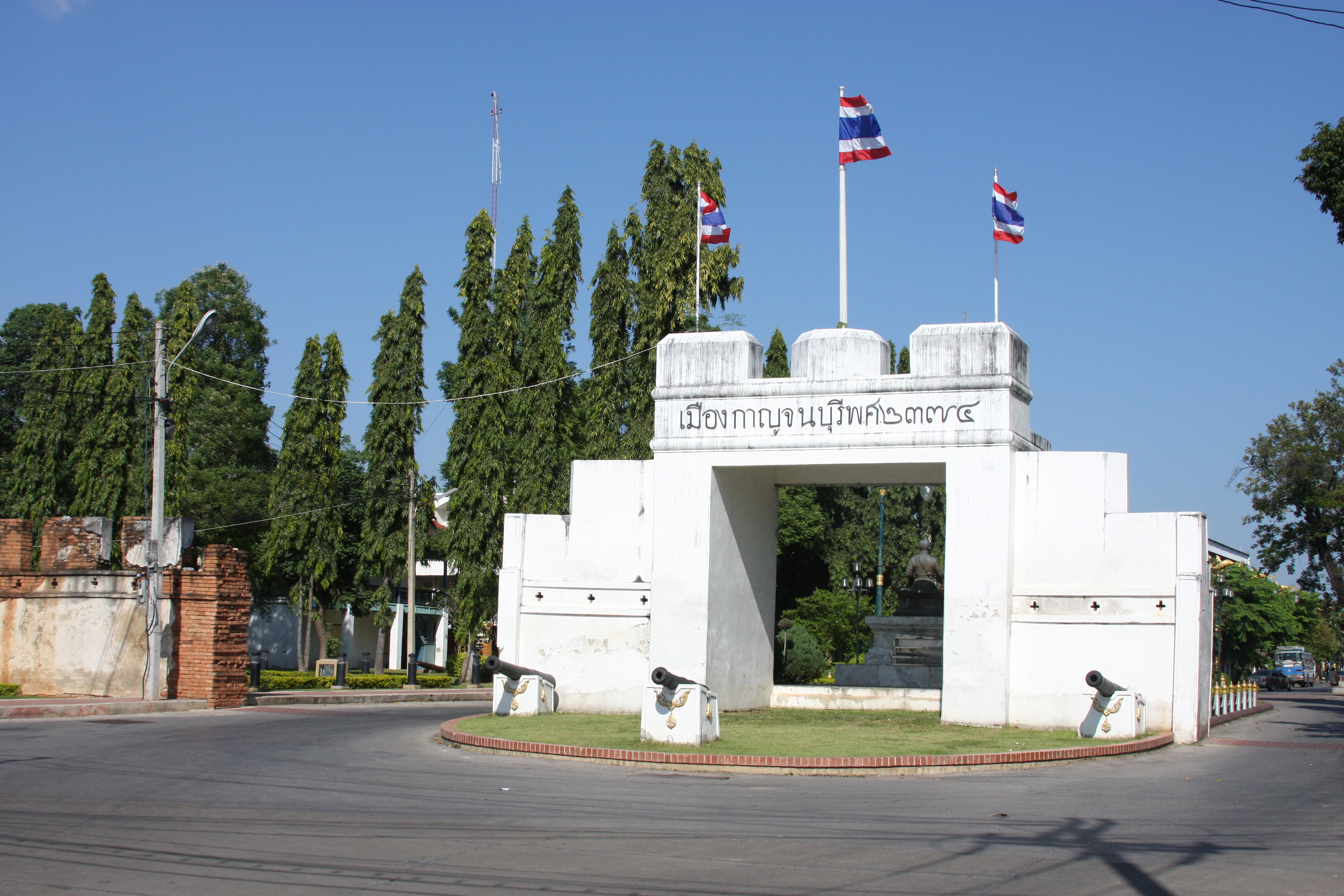
- Kanchanaburi city gate

- Location in Thailand
- Coordinates: 14°1′10″N 99°31′52″E
- Country: Thailand
- Province: Kanchanaburi
- District: Mueang Kanchanaburi
- Elevation: 98 ft (30 m)

Population (2017)
  - Total: 25,651
- Time zone: UTC+7 (ICT)

Kanchanaburi (Thai: กาญจนบุรี, pronounced [kāːn.t͡ɕā.ná(ʔ).bū.rīː]) is a town municipality (thesaban mueang) in Kanchanaburi Province, Thailand. The town of lies to the southeast of Erawan National Park within Kanchanaburi Province, approximately 120km west of Bangkok. In 2006 it had a population of 31,327. That number was reduced to 25,651 in 2017. The town covers tambons Ban Nuea and Ban Tai and parts of Pak Phraek and Tha Makham, all of Mueang Kanchanaburi District, and parts of tambon Tha Lo of Tha Muang District.

== History ==
In the late 18th century, Kanchanaburi was established by King Rama I as a defensive outpost against possible Burmese attacks in what is now Lat Ya Sub-district. In 1833, the town was moved about 16 km to the southeast along the river to its present site during the reign of King Rama III.

From the Ayutthaya period to the Thonburi and Rattanakosin periods, Kanchanaburi was an important outpost to defend against Burmese invasions. The old town was located at Tambon Lat Ya (Khao Chon Kai in the present). In 1831, King Rama III moved the city to the southeast, about 16 kilometers, to set at the confluence of the Khwae Yai River and the Khwae Noi River, which is the location of the town today.

On March 25, 1935, a royal decree was issued for Ban Nuea Subdistrict and Ban Tai Subdistrict, which has an area of approximately 2.08 square kilometers.

== Geography ==
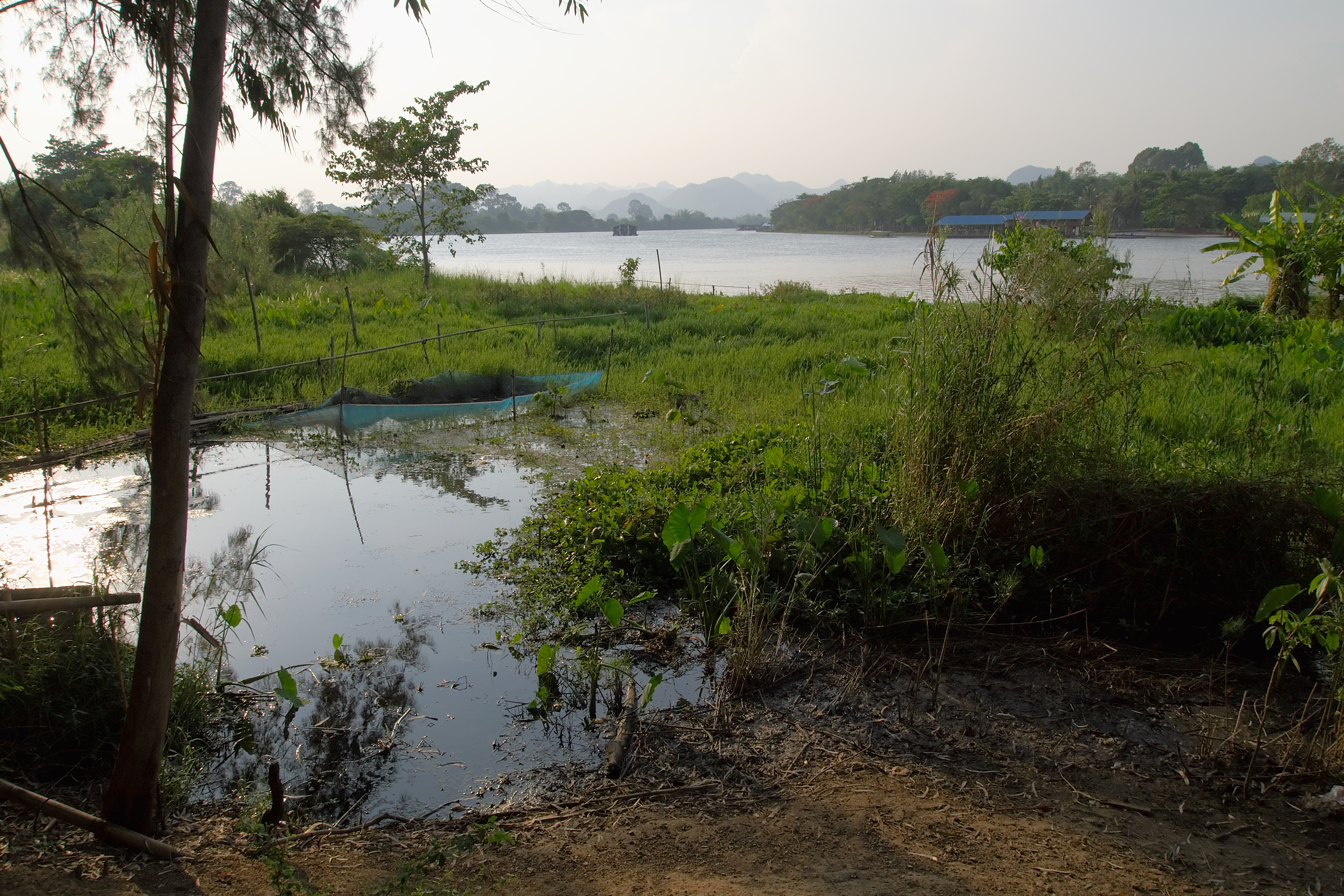
Khwae Noi and Khwae Yai Rivers

Kanchanaburi, where the Khwae Noi and Khwae Yai Rivers converge into the Mae Klong River, spans the northern banks of the river and is a popular spot for travelers. Its location at the edge of a mountain range keeps it much cooler than the other provinces of central Thailand.

== Economy ==
The city has two major commercial districts: the downtown area consists of a grid of several streets with office buildings, shop fronts, and a shopping mall; and the riverfront area businesses are mostly further west along River Kwai Road. Once a year a carnival comes to town and is set up in the area next to the bridge. At night there is a small pyrotechnics display that re-enacts the wartime bombing of the bridge.

The riverfront has skywalk, and next to it is Walking Street. The skywalk is a "12-metre high and 150 metre-long" glass walkway, owned by the local government; to access the skywalk, one must pay [on site] 60 baht to own a pair of plastic shoes.

== Buddhism ==
Kanchanaburi is the birthplace of the Buddhist monk Phrabhavanaviriyakhun. It is 5 kilometres (3.1 mi) southeast of the Buddhist temple Wat Tham Phu Wa which features a series of grotto shrines within a large limestone cave system. Each grotto features a statue of the Buddha at a different stage of his life. It is the easiest access point to the nearby Tiger Temple (closed) and is also home to a Vipassana meditation center.

== Death railway ==
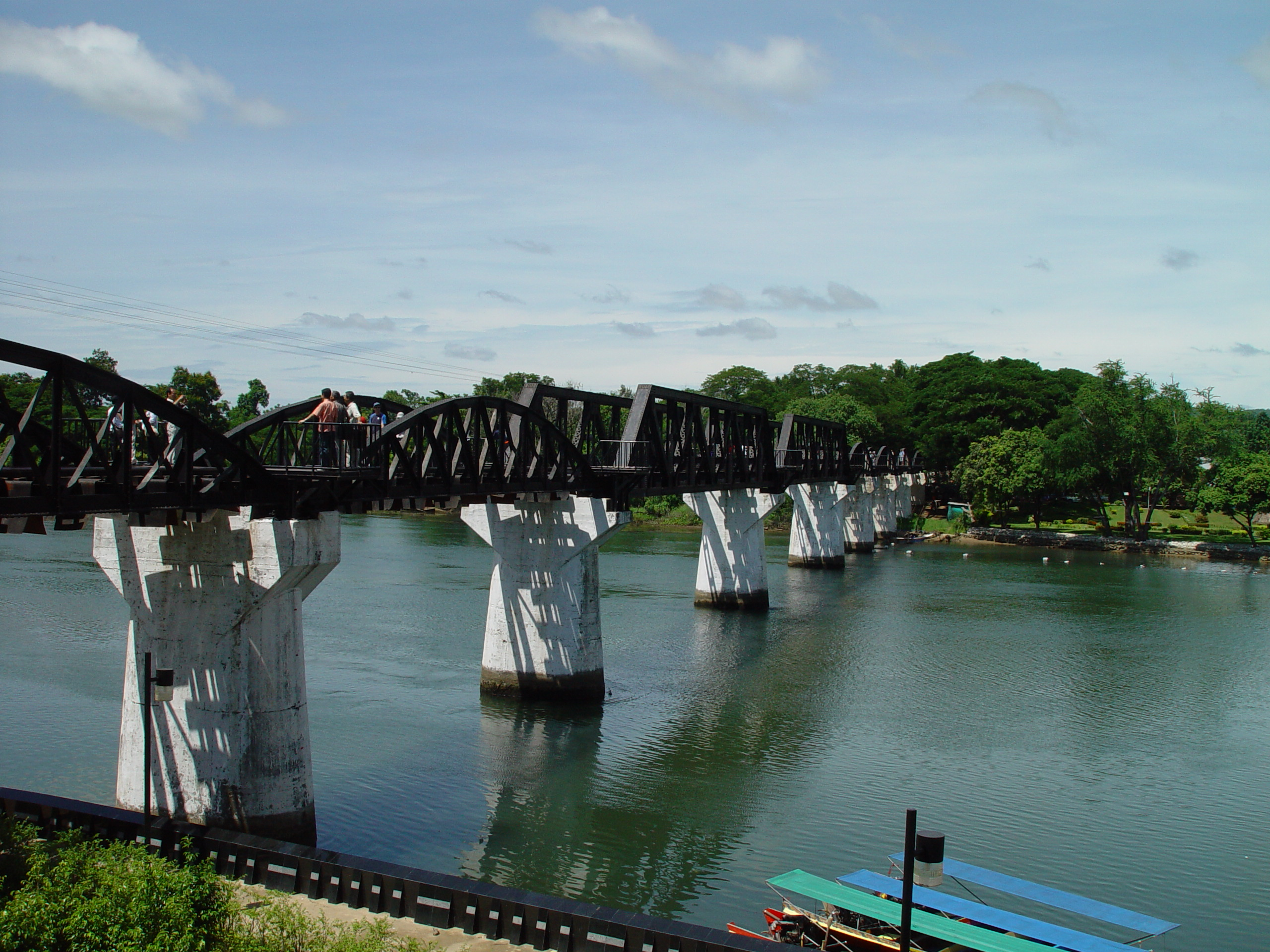
The Bridge over the River Kwai

In 1942 Kanchanaburi was under Japanese control. It was here that Asian forced labourers and Allied POWs, building the infamous Burma Railway, constructed a bridge, an event fictionalised in the films The Bridge on the River Kwai (1957), Return from the River Kwai (1989) and The Railway Man (2013). Almost half of the prisoners working on the project died from disease, maltreatment or accidents. There were four POW camps in or near the city, including Tamarkan which was used as a work camp to construct the bridge. After the completion of the railway line, most prisoners were concentrated in the Kanchanaburi area, and often sent on to Japan or French Indo-China.

At Kanchanaburi, there is a memorial and two museums to commemorate the dead. In March 2003, the Thailand–Burma Railway Centre opened and the JEATH (Japanese-English-American-Australian-Thai-Holland) War Museum dedicated to the bridge and the Death Railway. The city is also home to the Kanchanaburi War Cemetery.

The Chungkai War Cemetery is located about 5 kilometres (3.1 mi) from Kanchanaburi.

== Climate ==
Kanchanaburi has a tropical savanna climate (Köppen climate classification Aw). Winters are dry and very warm. Temperatures rise until April, which is very hot with the average daily maximum at 38.2 °C (100.8 °F). The monsoon season runs from May through October, with heavy rain and somewhat cooler temperatures during the day, although nights remain warm.

Climate data for Kanchanaburi (1991–2020, extremes 1952-present)
Month	Jan	Feb	Mar	Apr	May	Jun	Jul	Aug	Sep	Oct	Nov	Dec	Year
Record high °C (°F)	38.4 (101.1)	40.8 (105.4)	42.3 (108.1)	44.0 (111.2)	42.8 (109.0)	40.6 (105.1)	39.7 (103.5)	39.4 (102.9)	39.8 (103.6)	36.0 (96.8)	38.0 (100.4)	36.4 (97.5)	44.0 (111.2)
Mean daily maximum °C (°F)	33.0 (91.4)	35.3 (95.5)	37.0 (98.6)	38.0 (100.4)	36.3 (97.3)	34.8 (94.6)	33.9 (93.0)	33.8 (92.8)	33.7 (92.7)	32.4 (90.3)	32.1 (89.8)	31.7 (89.1)	34.3 (93.8)
Daily mean °C (°F)	26.3 (79.3)	28.2 (82.8)	29.9 (85.8)	31.1 (88.0)	30.2 (86.4)	29.4 (84.9)	28.8 (83.8)	28.6 (83.5)	28.3 (82.9)	27.7 (81.9)	26.9 (80.4)	25.7 (78.3)	28.4 (83.2)
Mean daily minimum °C (°F)	20.4 (68.7)	22.1 (71.8)	24.3 (75.7)	25.6 (78.1)	25.7 (78.3)	25.3 (77.5)	24.9 (76.8)	24.8 (76.6)	24.5 (76.1)	23.7 (74.7)	22.3 (72.1)	20.3 (68.5)	23.7 (74.6)
Record low °C (°F)	5.5 (41.9)	12.1 (53.8)	13.9 (57.0)	17.9 (64.2)	20.5 (68.9)	22.9 (73.2)	21.1 (70.0)	22.2 (72.0)	20.2 (68.4)	17.0 (62.6)	11.6 (52.9)	6.8 (44.2)	5.5 (41.9)
Average precipitation mm (inches)	7.6 (0.30)	18.3 (0.72)	39.4 (1.55)	66.4 (2.61)	139.4 (5.49)	98.9 (3.89)	106.0 (4.17)	100.6 (3.96)	219.0 (8.62)	206.3 (8.12)	44.6 (1.76)	7.2 (0.28)	1,053.7 (41.48)
Average precipitation days (≥ 1.0 mm)	0.8	1.1	2.6	4.2	10.1	10.0	10.6	11.0	13.8	12.0	3.5	0.8	80.5
Average relative humidity (%)	64.5	62.5	62.6	63.4	69.9	72.1	73.1	73.9	76.5	79.4	72.3	65.9	69.7
Average dew point °C (°F)	18.4 (65.1)	19.5 (67.1)	21.1 (70.0)	22.5 (72.5)	23.5 (74.3)	23.4 (74.1)	23.1 (73.6)	23.2 (73.8)	23.5 (74.3)	23.4 (74.1)	21.1 (70.0)	18.3 (64.9)	21.8 (71.2)
Mean monthly sunshine hours	263.5	245.8	238.7	240.0	155.0	114.0	117.8	117.8	108.0	145.7	186.0	260.4	2,192.7
Mean daily sunshine hours	8.5	8.7	7.7	8.0	5.0	3.8	3.8	3.8	3.6	4.7	6.2	8.4	6.0
Source 1: World Meteorological Organization
Source 2: Office of Water Management and Hydrology, Royal Irrigation Department (sun 1981–2010) (extremes)

== See also ==
- Mueang Kanchanaburi District
- Beata Mundi Regina
- Kanchanaburi Province
- Kanchanaburi Rajabhat University
- Visuttharangsi School, the provincial secondary school of Kanchanaburi
- Siam–Burma Death Railway (film) (film)
- Kanchanaburi War Cemetery
