= Philip Toosey =

British military officer (1904–1975)

Sir Philip John Denton Toosey
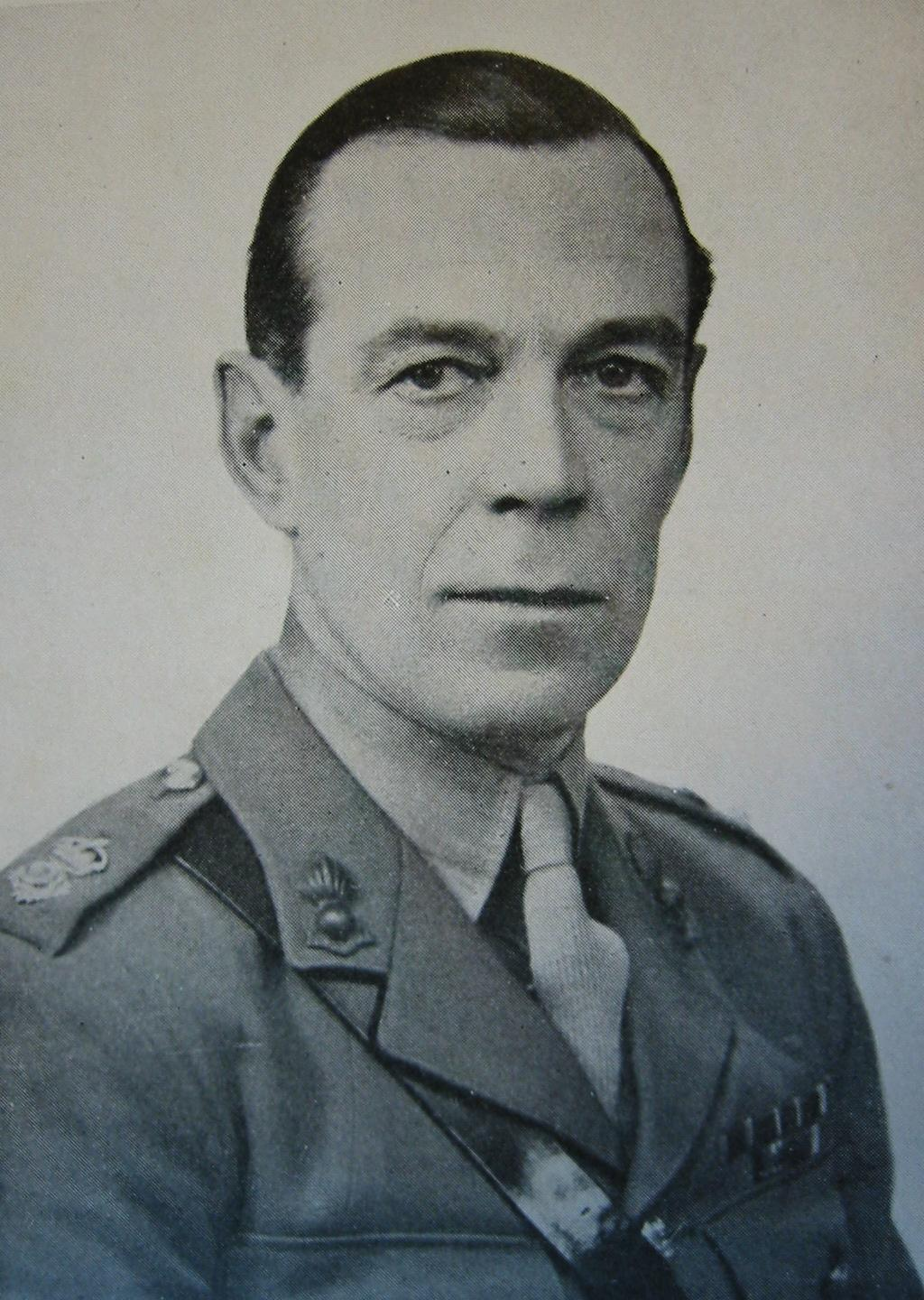
- Lieutenant Colonel Philip Toosey c. 1942
- Born: 12 August 1904; Oxton, Birkenhead
- Died: 22 December 1975 (aged 71)
- Burial place: Landican Cemetery
- Relatives: Julie Summers (granddaughter)
- Military career
- Allegiance: United Kingdom
- Branch: British Army
- Service years: 1927–1954
- Rank: Brigadier
- Service number: 38862
- Units: Royal Artillery; Hertfordshire Yeomanry
- Commands: 135th (Hertfordshire Yeomanry) Field Regiment, Royal Artillery
- Conflicts: World War II: Battle of Singapore
- Awards: Knight Bachelor; Commander of the Order of the British Empire; Distinguished Service Order; Territorial Decoration

Brigadier Sir Philip John Denton Toosey CBE, DSO, TD, JP (12 August 1904 – 22 December 1975), was, as a lieutenant colonel, the senior Allied officer in the Japanese prisoner-of-war camp at Tha Maa Kham (known as Tamarkan) in Thailand during World War II. The men at this camp built Bridge 277 of the Burma Railway as later fictionalized in the book The Bridge over the River Kwai by Pierre Boulle, and since adapted into the Oscar-winning film The Bridge on the River Kwai in which Alec Guinness played the senior British officer, Lt Col Nicholson. Both the book and film outraged former prisoners because Toosey did not collaborate with the enemy, unlike the fictional Lt Col Nicholson.

== Early life ==
Toosey was born in Upton Road, Oxton, Birkenhead, one of seven children of Charles Denton Toosey, proprietor of a successful shipping agency (Ross, Skolfield & Company), and Caroline (née Percy), whose father had been governor of Dublin Gaol. He was educated at home until the age of nine, then at Birkenhead School to the age of thirteen and then at Gresham's School, Holt, Norfolk. His father forbade him to accept a scholarship to Cambridge and so he was apprenticed to his uncle Philip Brewster Toosey's firm of Liverpool cotton merchants. During the 1926 general strike, he and members of his rugby team unloaded a refrigerated ship. In 1927 he was commissioned into 59th (4th West Lancs) Medium Brigade, RA of the Territorial Army, serving under Lt Col Alan C. Tod. When, in 1929 his uncle's firm went bankrupt, he joined Baring Brothers, merchant bankers as assistant to Lt Col Tod, who was the Liverpool agent at the time. Toosey continued to develop as an officer within the TA; he was promoted to Lieutenant in November 1931, Captain in April 1932 and Major in April 1934.

He married Muriel Alexandra (Alex) Eccles on 27 July 1932 and they had two sons and a daughter.

== Army career ==
In August 1939 his regiment was mobilised and saw brief action in Belgium in May 1940 before retreating back into France. He was evacuated from Dunkirk. Following a course at the Senior Officers' School, he commanded and trained a home defence battery at Cambridge. In 1941, promoted to Lieutenant Colonel, he was appointed to command the 135th (Hertfordshire Yeomanry) Field Regiment, RA. In October 1941, his unit was shipped to the Far East. He was awarded the Distinguished Service Order for heroism during the defence of Singapore. Because of his qualities of leadership, his superiors ordered him on 12 February 1942 to join the evacuation of Singapore, but Toosey refused so that he could remain with his men during their captivity.

== Building the bridges ==
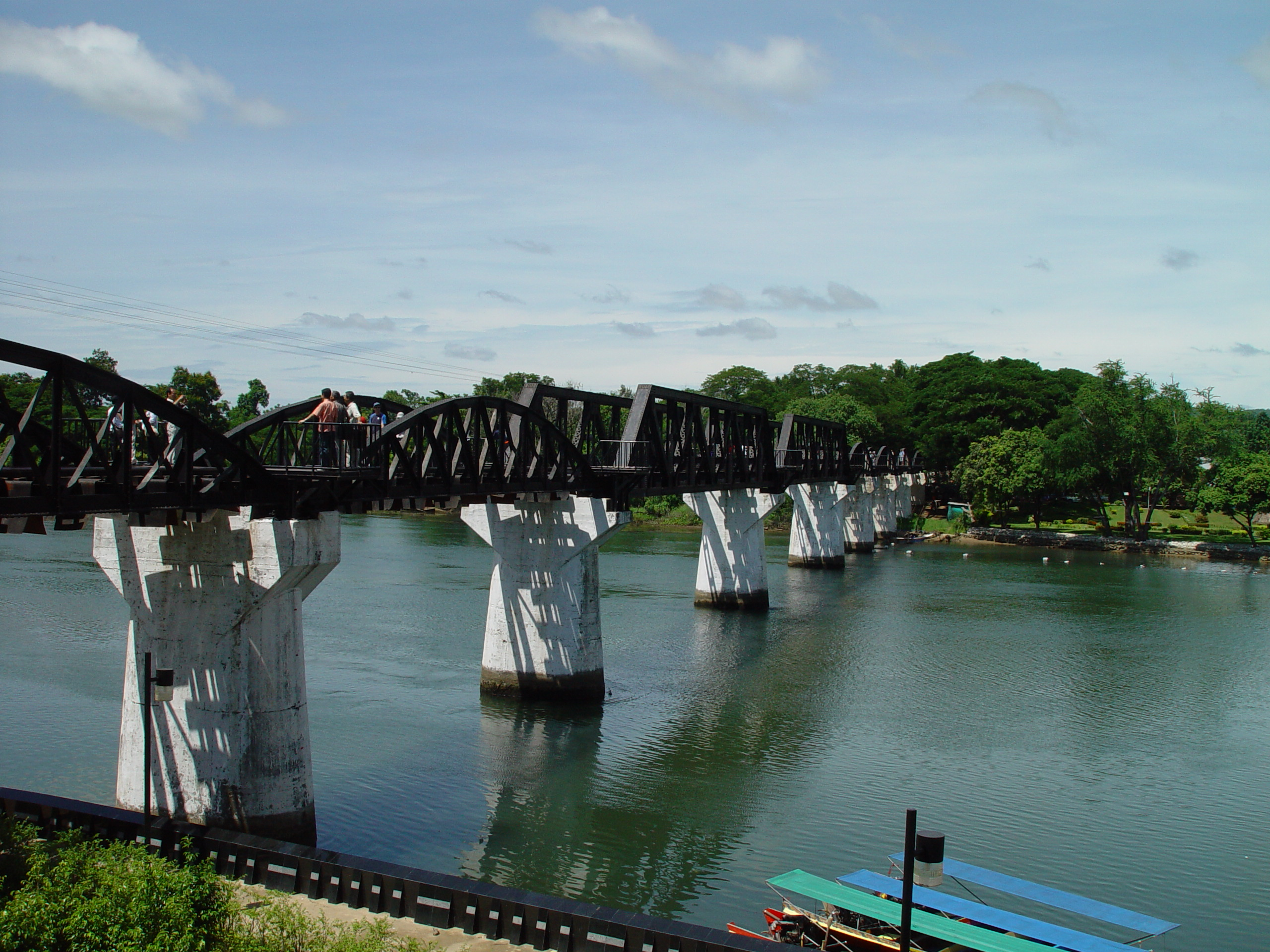
The bridge over the Kwai River in June 2004. The round truss spans are the originals; the angular replacements were supplied by the Japanese as war reparations.

Toosey and his men were required to build railway bridges over the Khwae Yai near where it joins the Khwae Noi to form the Mae Klong in Thailand. The Khwae Mae Khlong above the confluence was renamed the Khwae Yai in 1960. This was part of a project to link existing Thai and Burmese railway lines to create a route from Bangkok to Rangoon to support the Japanese occupation of Burma. About a hundred thousand conscripted Asian labourers and 12,000 prisoners of war died on the whole project, which was nicknamed the Death Railway.

A camp was established at Tamarkan, which is about five kilometres from Kanchanaburi. In the Tamarkan camp, Toosey worked courageously to ensure that as many as possible of the 2,000 Allied prisoners would survive. He endured regular beatings when he complained of ill-treatment of prisoners, but as a skilled negotiator he was able to win many concessions from the Japanese by convincing them that this would speed the completion of the work. Toosey also organised the smuggling in of food and medicine, working with Boonpong Sirivejjabhandu. Boonpong was a Thai merchant who supplied camps at the southern end of the railway taking great risks and was honoured after the war.

Toosey maintained discipline in the camp and, where possible, cleanliness and hygiene. His policy was of unity and equality and so refused to allow a separate officers' mess or officers' accommodation. He also ordered his officers to intervene if necessary to protect the men. For his conduct in the camp, he won the undying respect of his men. He was considered by many to be the outstanding British officer on the railway.

Behind the backs of the Japanese, Toosey did everything possible to delay and sabotage the construction without endangering his men. Refusal to work would have meant instant execution. Termites were collected in large numbers to eat the wooden structures and the concrete was badly mixed. Toosey also helped organise a daring escape, at considerable cost to himself. (In the film the fictional colonel forbids escapes.) The two escaping officers had been given a month's rations and Toosey concealed their escape for 48 hours. After a month the two escapees were recaptured and bayoneted. Toosey was punished for concealing the escape.

Two bridges were built: a temporary wooden bridge and a few months later a permanent steel and concrete bridge which was completed in 1943. At the end of the film the wooden bridge is destroyed by a commando raid when actually, both bridges were used for two years until they were destroyed by Allied aerial bombing, the steel bridge first in June 1945; there had been seven previous bombing missions. The steel bridge has been repaired and is still in use today.

== After the bridges ==
After completion of the steel bridge the majority of fit men were moved to camps further up the line. Toosey was ordered to organize Tamarkan as a hospital, which he did despite difficulties including minimal food and medical supplies. The Japanese considered it the best-run prisoner-of-war camp on the railway and gave him considerable autonomy. In December 1943 Toosey was transferred to help run Camp Nong Pladuk, and in December 1944 he was moved to the allied officers' camp at Kanchanaburi where he was the liaison officer with the Japanese.

He and some other officers had been separated from his men at Nakhon Nayok camp and were being held there as hostages when Japan surrendered in August 1945. At that time, Toosey weighed 105 pounds (47 kg); before the war he weighed 175 pounds (79 kg). Despite his weak state, Toosey insisted on travelling 300 miles (500 km) into the jungle to oversee the liberation of his men.

== After the war ==
At the end of the war, Toosey saved the life of Sergeant-Major Saito (not a colonel as in the film). Saito was second in command at the camp and was thought to be not as bad as many of the guards. Toosey spoke up for him and as a result Saito did not stand trial. Over 200 Japanese were hanged for their crimes and many more served long prison sentences. Saito respected Toosey greatly and they corresponded after the war. Saito said that "He showed me what a human being should be and he changed the philosophy of my life." After Toosey died, Saito travelled from Japan to visit the grave. After Saito died in 1990, his family discovered that he had become a Christian.

After the war Toosey resumed his service with the Territorial Army as commanding officer of 359 (4th West Lancs) Medium Regiment and was promoted to brigadier to command 87 Army Group Royal Artillery, comprising all the TA artillery units in Liverpool. He retired from the TA in 1954, and was appointed a Commander of the Order of the British Empire in 1955. He later became Honorary Colonel of the West Lancashire Regiment, RA, successor unit to his former commands. Toosey also returned to banking with Barings in Liverpool and expanded their services greatly.

He worked for the veterans all his life, and in 1966 became president of the National Federation of Far East Prisoners of War.

The film The Bridge on the River Kwai was released in 1957. In the film, the senior British officer was portrayed as working with the Japanese. This was regarded by many former prisoners of war as a gross travesty of the truth. Toosey initially refused repeated requests by the veterans to speak out against the film, being much too modest to seek any glory or recognition for himself. Eventually he was persuaded to write a letter to the Daily Telegraph, which caused several other veterans to emphasise the injustice that had occurred. Nevertheless, the film was highly successful and so formed the public perception of events at Tamarkan. As a result, Toosey agreed several years later to be interviewed by Professor Peter Davies, providing 48 hours of taped interviews on the understanding that they were not to be published until after Toosey's death. Eventually Davies documented Toosey's achievements in a 1991 book entitled The Man Behind the Bridge (ISBN 0-485-11402-X) and a BBC Timewatch programme. A book by his oldest granddaughter, Julie Summers, The Colonel of Tamarkan, was published in 2005 (ISBN 0-7432-6350-2).

Toosey was a Justice of the Peace, and High Sheriff of Lancashire for 1964. He raised funds for the Liverpool School of Tropical Medicine. In 1974 he was awarded an honorary LLD by Liverpool University and was knighted. Phil Toosey died on 22 December 1975. The Royal Artillery Army Reserve Barracks on Aigburth Road in Liverpool was renamed The Brigadier Philip Toosey Barracks. His ashes were buried in Landican Cemetery outside Birkenhead. A service of thanksgiving for the Life and Work of Sir Philip Toosey took place at Liverpool Parish Church on Saturday 31 January 1976.
