= Gordon Smith (British Army officer) =

British soldier, born 1920

Major Joseph Gordon Smith (23 October 1920 – 22 April 2014) was a soldier who served with the 2nd Battalion of the Argyll and Sutherland Highlanders and the Royal Army Ordnance Corps. Smith served in Malaya during the Second World War and survived being held as a prisoner of war by the Japanese. During his imprisonment, Smith experienced many hardships and was forced to work on the Burma Railway, an experience which was illustrated by the film The Bridge on the River Kwai.

Smith went to Melville College and was a medical student at the University of Edinburgh for two years before enlisting during the war. Smith was sent to fight in Malaya at the age of 21 and suffered three gunshot wounds during the Battle of Slim River. After marching for three weeks he was taken prisoner at Pudu Prison in Kuala Lumpur. After a few months he was taken to Tamarkan as forced labour to work on the railway there. Initially Smith worked on the construction of railway bridges over the river, but the compound was converted to a hospital camp which allowed him to use his medical training to help fellow prisoners.

In 1945, Smith was facing execution by his captors but was saved by the atomic bombings of Hiroshima and Nagasaki which brought about the end of the war and Smith's liberation. He was said to have displayed "immense courage" to survive the horrific treatment he endured as a prisoner, and by the end of the war, he weighed only 6 stone. His resourcefulness in helping other prisoners was also noted: he made surgical tools to treat prisoners, sedating them with chloroform; he created a distillation unit to obtain clean water; he fixed a radio smuggled into the prison; and he found a way to diagnose malaria in his fellow prisoners earlier.

After the war, Smith served in Germany on bomb disposal work for the Royal Army Ordnance Corps. In 1945, he moved to De Havilland to work on the Blue Streak (missile), and later on the Europa (rocket) project. Smith was awarded the 1939–45 Star, the Pacific Star, and the War Medal 1939–1945. Smith published his memoirs, entitled War Memories: A Medical Student in Malaya and Thailand in 2008.

== See also ==
- Philip Toosey
- Japanese prisoners of war in World War II
