= Mueang Kanchanaburi district =

Mueang Kanchanaburi เมืองกาญจนบุรี
- District
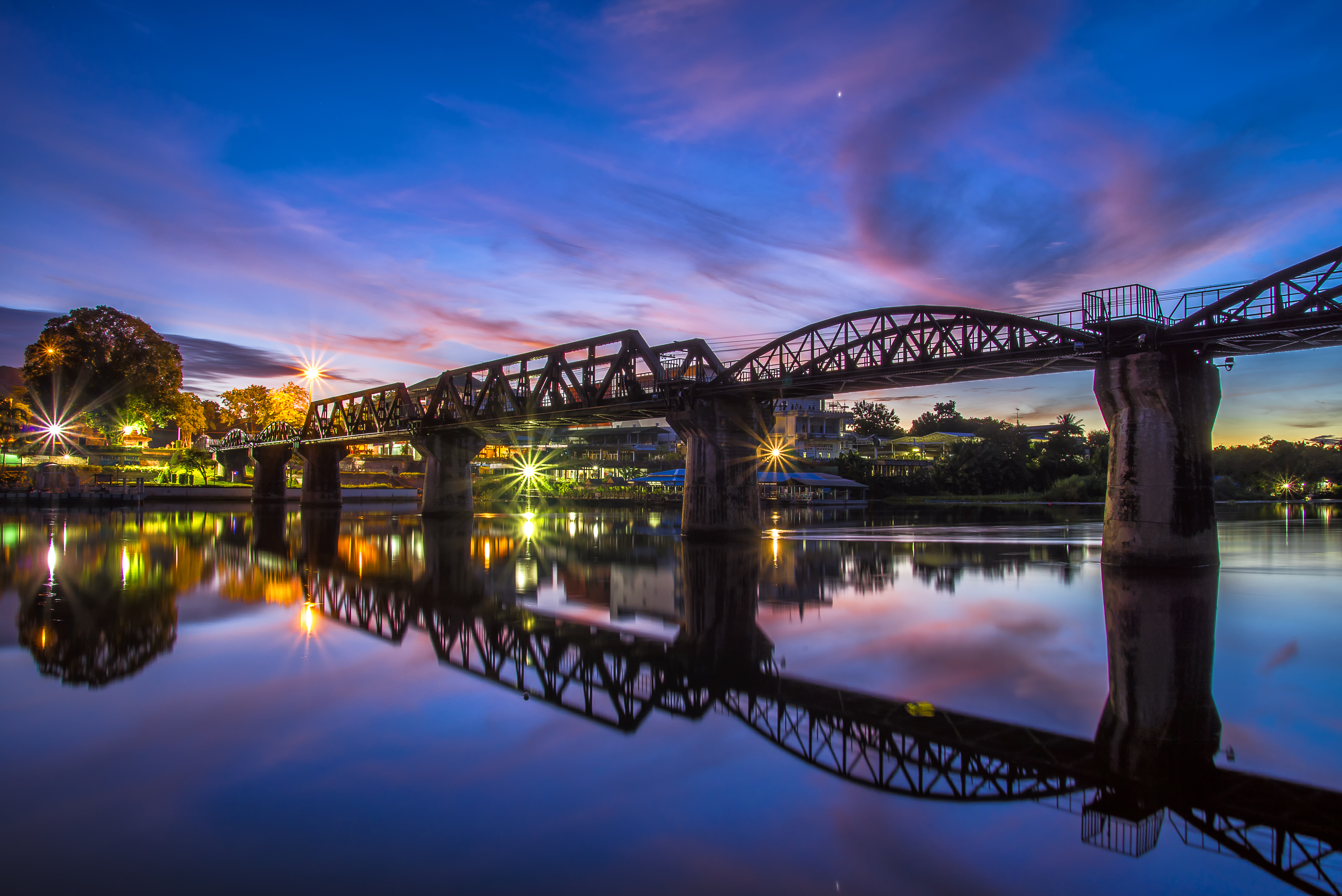
- Bridge over the River Kwai, Kwai River

- District location in Kanchanaburi province
- Coordinates: 14°0′12″N 99°33′0″E
- Country: Thailand
- Province: Kanchanaburi
- Seat: Pak Phraek

Area
  - Total: 1,236 km^{2} (477 sq mi)

Population (2024)
  - Total: 168,542
  - Density: 136/km^{2} (350/sq mi)
- Time zone: UTC+7 (ICT)
- Postal code: 71000 + 71190
- Calling code: 034
- ISO 3166 code: TH-7101

Mueang Kanchanaburi (เมืองกาญจนบุรี, pronounced [mɯ̄aŋ kāːn.tɕā.ná(ʔ).bū.rīː]) is the capital district (amphoe mueang) of Kanchanaburi province, western Thailand.

== History ==
Mueang Kanchanaburi changed status to become the capital district (amphoe mueang) of Kanchanaburi Province in 1913. The old district office was in subdistrict Ban Nuea. It was moved to subdistrict Pak Phraek on 1 October 1954.

The district is home to the "bridge over the River Kwai", part of World War II's Death Railway.

== Geography ==
Neighboring are (from west clockwise) Tanintharyi Division of Myanmar, Sai Yok, Si Sawat, Bo Phloi, Phanom Thuan, Tha Muang, and Dan Makham Tia of Kanchanaburi Province.

The district is located in the southern foothills of the province.

The Khwae Noi and Khwae Yai Rivers are important water resources which join at the town Kanchanaburi to form the Mae Klong River.

Phu Nam Ron is a transnational cross-border point at the western end of the district. It is expected to gain in importance if the planned Dawei deepwater port project goes ahead, along with a highway and a railway line between Bangkok and that harbor.

== Administration ==
=== Provincial administration ===
The district is divided into thirteen subdistricts (tambons), which are further subdivided into 102 administrative villages (mubans).

No.	Subdistrict	Thai	Villages	Pop.
1.	Ban Nuea	บ้านเหนือ	-	8,394
2.	Ban Tai	บ้านใต้	-	5,505
3.	Pak Phraek	ปากแพรก	13	34,897
4.	Tha Makham	ท่ามะขาม	5	14,899
5.	Kaeng Sian	แก่งเสี้ยน	9	13,078
6.	Nong Bua	หนองบัว	8	13,532
7.	Lat Ya	ลาดหญ้า	7	25,339
8.	Wang Dong	วังด้ง	12	8,763
9.	Chong Sadao	ช่องสะเดา	7	3,836
10.	Nong Ya	หนองหญ้า	9	7,805
11.	Ko Samrong	เกาะสำโรง	10	10,879
13.	Ban Kao	บ้านเก่า	15	15,879
16	Wang Yen	วังเย็น	7	5,735
		Total	102	168,542

Missing numbers belong to subdistricts which now form Dan Makham Tia district

=== Local government ===
==== Municipalities ====
As of December 2024 there are six municipal (thesaban) areas in the district.

Mueang Kanchanaburi and Pak Phraek are town municipalities (thesaban mueang), Pak Phraek covers parts of Pak Phraek subdistrict, Mueang Kanchanaburi covers the subdistricts Ban Nuea and Ban Tai and parts of Pak Phraek and Tha Makham and also parts of Tha Lo subdistrict from Tha Muang district.

Tha Makham, Nong Bua, Kaeng Sian and Lat Ya are subdistrict municipalities (thesaban tambon), they all cover parts of their same-named subdistricts.

Kanchanaburi; Town municipality	Pop.	04710102	muangkancity.go.th/public
Ban Nuea	8,394		
Pak Phraek	6,307		
Ban Tai	5,505		
Tha Makham	3,117		
Tha Lo	1,301		
Total	24,624		

Town municipality	Pop.	LAO code	website
Pak Phraek	28,590	04710107	pakpraek.go.th/public

Subdistrict municipality	Pop.	LAO code	website
Tha Makham	11,782	05710103	thamakham.go.th
Nong Bua	7,120	05710106	nongbuakan.go.th
Kaeng Sian	6,457	05710104	kaengsiankan.go.th
Lat Ya	5,413	05710105	ladya.go.th

==== Subdistrict administrative organizations ====
The non-municipal areas are administered by nine subdistrict administrative organization - SAO (ongkan borihan suan tambon - o bo toh).

Subdistrict adm.org - SAO	Pop.	LAO code	website
Lat Ya SAO	19,926	06710112	ladya-sao.go.th
Ban Kao SAO	18,879	06710111	bankaokan.go.th
Ko Samrong SAO	10,879	06710108	kohsamrong.go.th
Wang Dong SAO	8,763	06710113	wangdong.go.th
Nong Ya SAO	7,805	06710116	nongyakan.go.th
Kaeng Sian SAO	6,621	06710109	kaengsian.go.th
Nong Bua SAO	6,412	06710115	nongbua-sao.go.th
Wang Yen SAO	5,735	06710114	wangyen-kan.go.th
Chong Sadao SAO	3,836	06710110	chongsadao.go.th

== Education ==
- Kanchanaburi Rajabhat University
- Faculty of Science, Mahidol University
- Kanchanaburi Technical Collegetechnickan.ac.th
- Kanchanaburi Vocational Collegekanvc.ac.th
- 9 secondary schools
- 59 primary schools

== Healthcare ==
=== Hospitals ===
Mueang Kanchanaburi district is served by four hospitals

- Phaholpolpayuhasena Hospital with 597 beds
- Synphaet Kanchanaburi Hospital with 100 beds
- Fort Surasi Hospital with 80 beds
- Thanakan Hospital with 74 beds

=== Health promoting hospitals ===
In the district there are twenty-one health-promoting hospitals in total.

1 Wang Yen	1 Koh Samrong	1 Nong Bua	1 Pak Phraek	1 Tha Makham	1 Kaeng Sian
2 Lat Ya	2 Chong Sadao	2 Nong Ya	4 Wang Dong	5 Ban Kao

== Religion ==
There are seventy-nine Theravada Buddhist temples in the district.

1 Ban Tai	2 Ban Nuea	3 Wang Yen	5 Kaeng Sian	5 Ko Samrong
5 Nong Bua	5 Tha Makham	7 Pak Phraek	7 Lat Ya	8 Chong Sadao
9 Wang Dong	9 Nong Ya	13 Ban Kao

The Christians have twelve churches and muslims have one mosque.
