= Burma bridge =

The Burma Bridge may represent:

- The bridges of the Burma Railway, built by Japanese during World War II, especially those over the River Kwai (Kwai Bridge)
- The Bridge over the River Kwai, novel about building the Burma railroad bridges, as a fictionalized account
- The Bridge on the River Kwai, film about building the Burma railroad bridges, as a fictionalized account
- A hanging bridge often part of a Ropes course that consists of a single wire or rope to walk on and two others to hold on to.
