= Tamarkan =

- Tha Makhan
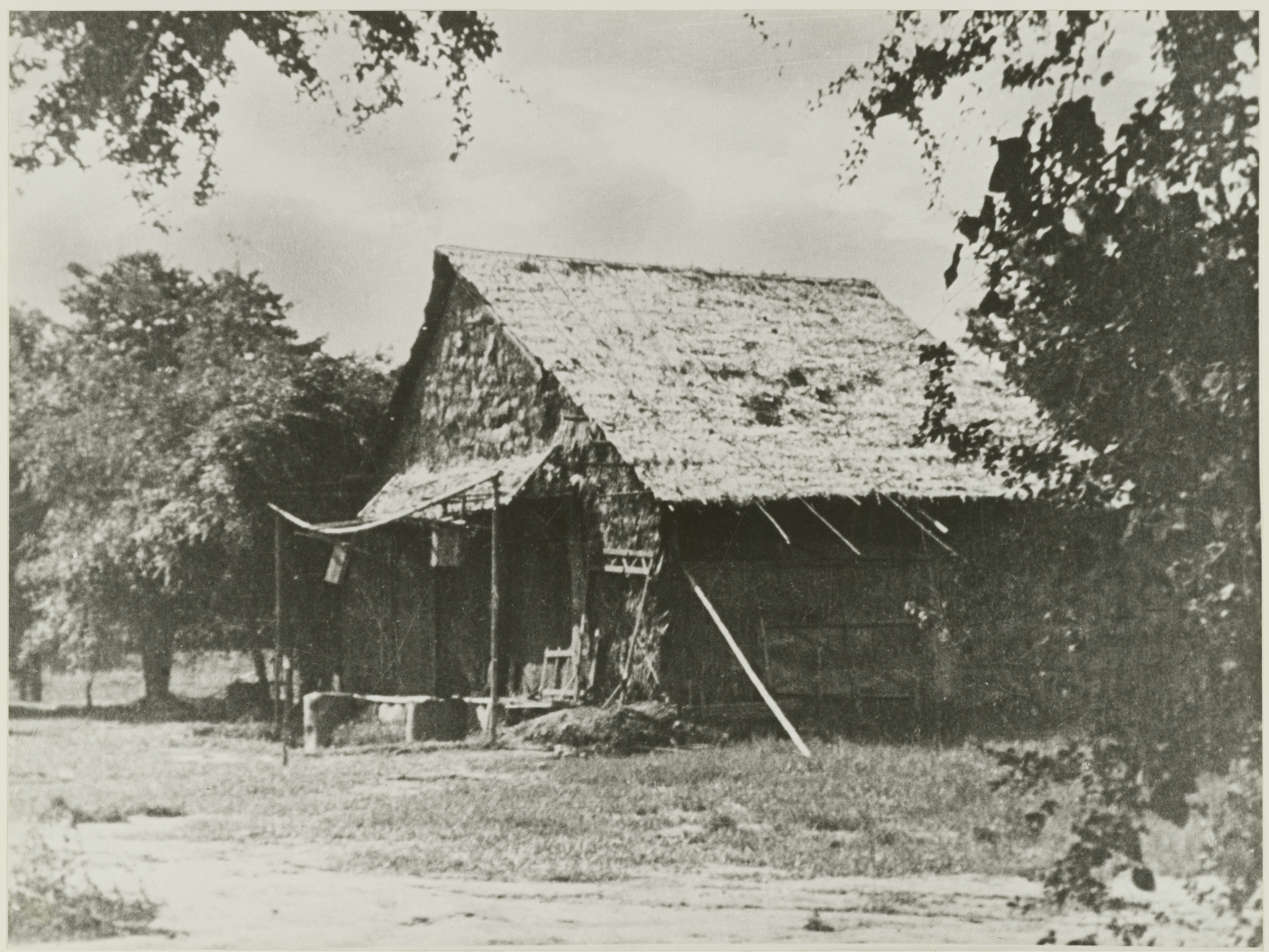
- Theatre hut at Tamarkan (1942 or 43)

- Location within Thailand

General information
- Location: Kanchanaburi, Kanchanaburi province, Thailand
- Coordinates: 14.04101°N 99.50478°E
- Construction started: 1942
- Demolished: 1945

Tamarkan (also: Tha Makhan) was a Japanese prisoner of war work camp during World War II. The camp was initially used for the construction of the bridge over the Khwae Yai or Mae Klong River and not the River Kwai. The camp was located about five kilometres from the city of Kanchanaburi. In November 1943, Tamarkan was turned into a convalescent camp and hospital. By 1945, the camp was gone.

The bridge was made famous by the 1957 film, The Bridge on the River Kwai, which was a fictitious and inaccurate account. Inaccuracies include the identification of the wrong river, construction was not in the jungle, but near a city, two bridges had been built, which were destroyed at the end of World War II, and commander Philip Toosey did not collaborate with the Japanese.

== History ==
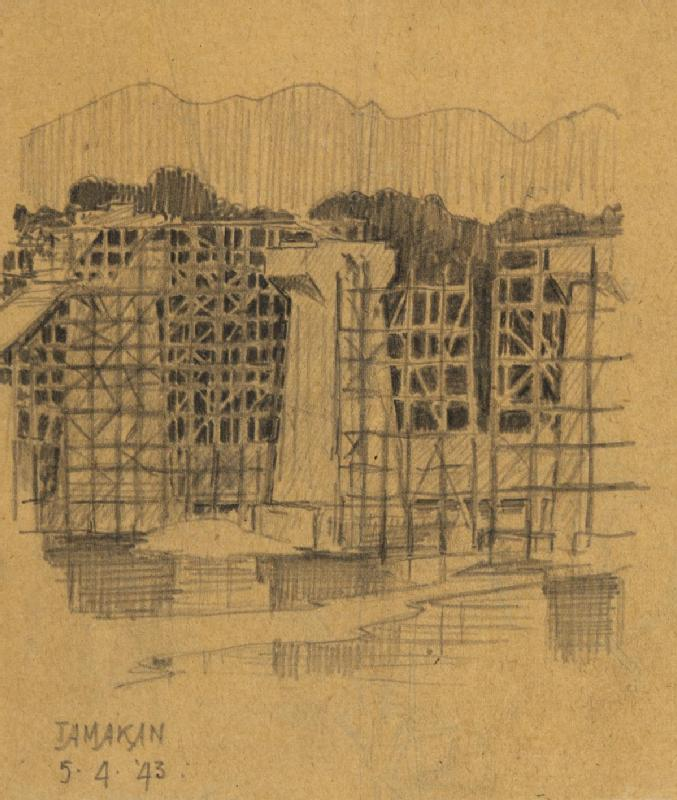
Sketch of the construction of the stone bridge (1943)

In 1939, plans had been developed by the Empire of Japan to construct a rail road connecting Thailand with Burma. Construction of the Burma Railway started on 16 September 1942. On 26 October 1942, British prisoners of war arrived at Tamarkan, 56 kilometres from the start of the railway, to construct a bridge over the Khwae Yai River. The wooden bridge was meant as a temporary bridge, and would be replaced by a concrete and steel bridge. Even though the railway makes an apparent detour by crossing at Tamarkan instead of Kanchanaburi, the ground was more stable and there was less chance of flooding.

The prisoners were commanded by Colonel Philip Toosey. The camp consisted of five attap huts surrounding by a perimeter fence. In February 1943, 1,000 Dutch prisoners of war commanded by Captain Hendrik Anthonie Tillema arrived, and five more huts were added. The Dutch were placed under the command of Toosey increasing the total number of troops to about 2,000. In January 1943, there was a cholera outbreak in the nearby Malayan conscript labour camp.

In March 1943, the wooden bridge was finished, and the first train crossed the bridge. A bridge in Java had been dismantled, and the spans were transported to Tamarkan to construct a concrete and steel bridge. In May 1943, the concrete and steel bridge was finished, and the wooden bridge was redesignated for pedestrians and cars. Most of the prisoners were moved to work camps further up the line.

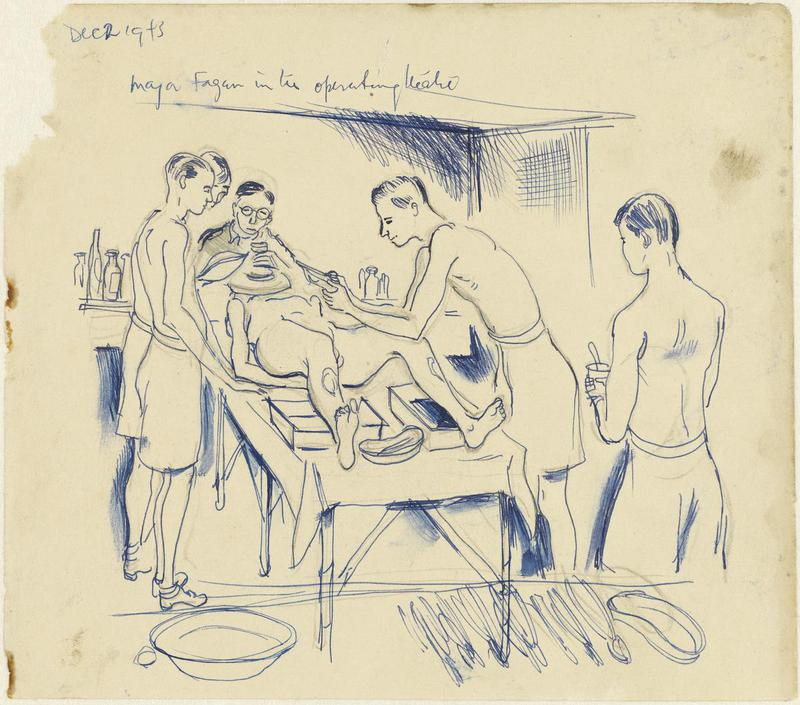
Operating theatre at Tamarkan (1943)

In November 1943, Tamarkan was turned into a convalescent camp and hospital. Toosey was ordered to oversee the conversion. He was transferred to Camp Nong Pladuk in December 1943. Tamarkan was not a proper hospital and the medical supplies were limited. The camp was home to about 1,500 men.

On 29 November 1943, the camp was hit by allied bombs killing 18 prisoners and wounding 68. Between December 1944 to June 1945, the bridges were attacked multiple times, and in February 1944, a span of the steel bridge was destroyed. By October 1945, the camp was gone, and only the Thayanusorn monument remained. The monument was revealed on 21 March 1944, and made by POWs in honour of their fallen comerades. After the war, the bridge was rebuilt.

The condition of the prisoners in the camp were described as horrendous with emaciated and diseased prisoners dressed in rags, There was a large graveyard near the camp. After the war, the bodies were re-buried at the Chungkai and the Kanchanaburi War Cemeteries except for the Americans who were repatriated back to the United States.

== Bibliography ==
- Julie Summers (2014). The Colonel Of Tamarkan: Philip Toosey And The Bridge On The River Kwai. Downtown Press. ISBN 9780743495738.
