= Khwae Noi River =

River in Thailand; also called the River Kwai

Coordinates: 14°09′36″N 99°31′25″E

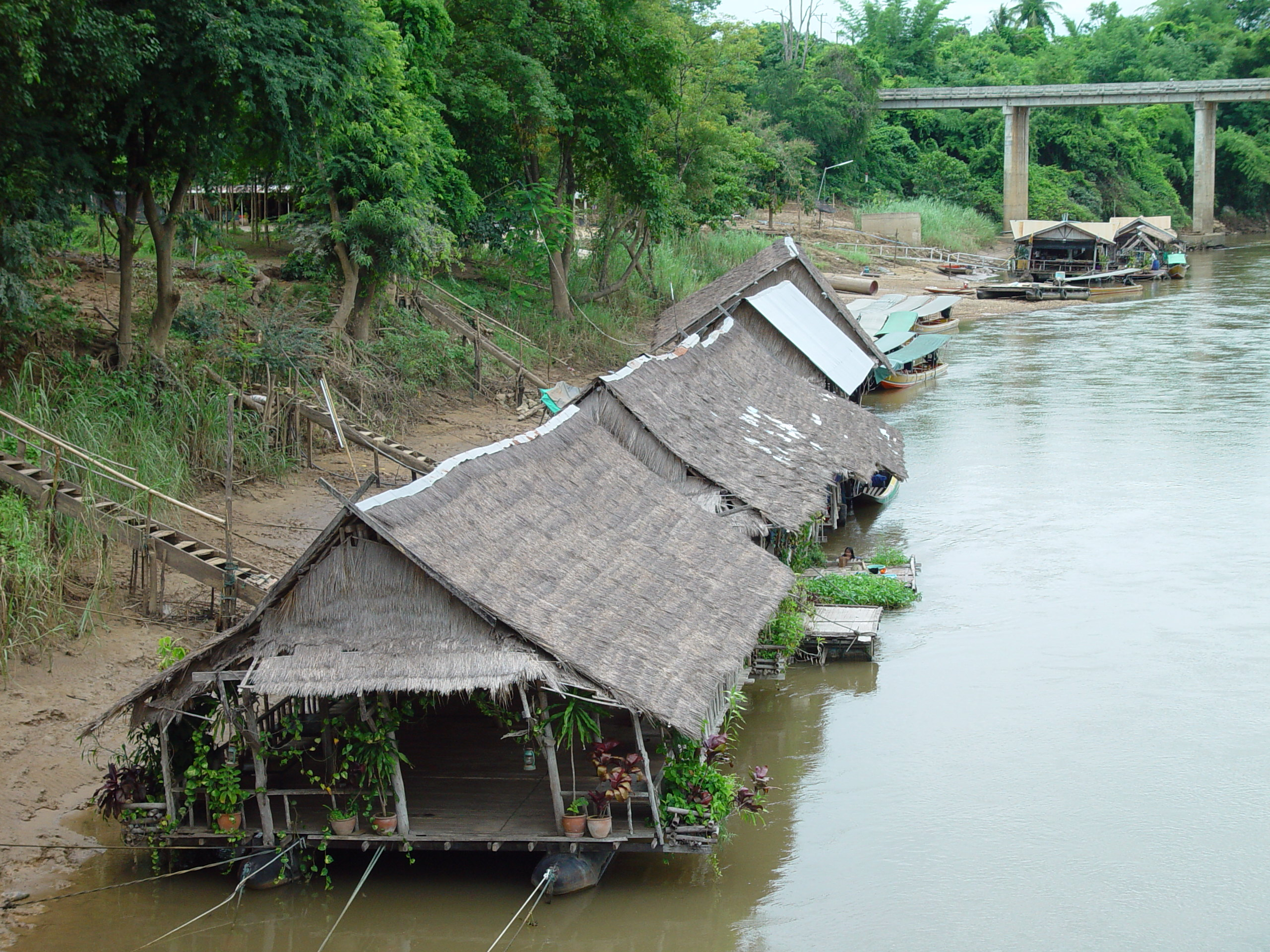
- Typical river houses with thatched roofs on the River Kwai
- Native name: แม่น้ำแควน้อย (Thai)

Location
- Country: Thailand

Physical characteristics
- Source
  - location: Near Three Pagodas Pass
- Mouth
  - location: Kanchanaburi
- Length: 278.68 km (173.16 mi)

Basin features
- River system: Mae Klong

The River Kwai (/kwaɪ/), or endonymically Khwae Noi (Thai: แควน้อย, pronounced [kʰwɛ̄ː nɔ́ːj], 'small tributary') or Khwae Sai Yok (แควไทรโยค, pronounced [kʰwɛ̄ː sāj jôːk]), is a river in western Thailand. It rises to the east of the Salween in the north–south spine of the Bilauktaung range near, but not over the border with Burma. It begins at the confluence of Ranti, Songkalia and Bikhli Rivers. At Kanchanaburi it merges with the Khwae Yai River to form the Mae Klong River, which empties into the Gulf of Thailand at Samut Songkhram.

The river is chiefly known for its association with the Pierre Boulle novel, The Bridge over the River Kwai and David Lean's film adaptation of the novel, The Bridge on the River Kwai, in which Australian, Dutch, and British prisoners of war and indigenous peoples were forced by the Japanese to construct two parallel bridges spanning a river as part of the Burma Railway, also called the "Railway of Death" or "Thai-Burma Death Railway", due to the many lives lost in its construction. One bridge was wooden and temporary. The other was made of concrete and steel and still exists. The bridges actually spanned the Mae Klong, but as the railway subsequently follows the Khwae Noi Valley, the bridges became famous under the wrong name. In the 1960s, the upper part of the Mae Klong was renamed the Khwae Yai ('big tributary').

The river was also used in Michael Cimino's Academy Award-winning film, The Deer Hunter. The prison camp and initial Russian roulette scene was filmed on the Kwai.

A military history of the building of the bridges during World War II can be found in Professor Peter Davies's biography of the British officer Philip Toosey, The Man Behind the Bridge: Colonel Toosey and the River Kwai. The book, and an associated BBC Timewatch documentary, challenge many of the inaccuracies portrayed in Boulle's novel and Lean's film.

The Vajiralongkorn Dam (formerly named Khao Laem Dam) and Srinagarind Dams are hydroelectric dams on the river.
