= Julie Summers =

British historian (born 1960)

- Born: 1960 (age 65–66); Clatterbridge, Wirral Peninsula, England
- Occupations: Writer; Researcher; Historian; Actress
- Years active: 2004 - Present
- Known for: Inspiring Home Fires
- Notable work: Jambusters; Fashion on the Ration; Fearless on Everest; Stranger in the House
- Relatives: Philip Toosey (grandfather); Andrew Irvine (great-uncle)

Julie Summers (born 1960) is an English author, historical consultant and writer, best known for the book Jambusters. The book focuses on several women who were members of the Women's Institute during World War II and who were inspiration for the ITV series Home Fires. She is the granddaughter of Philip Toosey and the great niece of Sandy Irvine.

== Early life and career ==
Summers was born at Clatterbridge on the Wirral Peninsula in 1960. She attended Culcheth Hall School, Altrincham, Howell's School, Denbigh and Wycombe Abbey School. She was at Munich Business School from 1978-80 and spent one year at Deutsche Bank. She then studied German and History of Art at Bristol University; Courtauld Institute of Art: Medieval Architecture. At the Royal Academy of Arts, she was secretary to Norman Rosenthal 1986-1989 and then became Deputy Curator for the Henry Moore Foundation 1989–1996, a freelance exhibition organiser 1996-2000 and Head of Exhibitions at the Ashmolean Museum, Oxford 2000–2004.

== Books ==
- Fearless on Everest: The Quest For Sandy Irvine (2001).
- The Colonel of Tamarkan, Philip Toosey and the Bridge on the River Kwai (2005). This is the true story of the events of The Bridge on the River Kwai
- Remembered: The History of the Commonwealth War Graves Commission (2007) - with Brian Harris
- Stranger in the House: Women's Stories of Men Returning from the Second World War (2009)
- British and Commonwealth War Cemeteries (2010)
- When the Children Came Home (2012) which focused on the evacuees who returned home from the war.
- Rowing In Britain (2012) A brief history of the last 200 years of rowing in Britain
- Jambusters: the story of the Women's Institute in the Second World War (2013) was the inspiration for the ITV Series Home Fires, in which Summers has a cameo appearance. The series began in May 2015 and following successful ratings ITV commissioned a second series. The book has also been published as Home Fires
- Fashion On The Ration: Style In The Second World War (2015) The book focuses on the fashion style during the 1940s.

== Other notable work ==
Summers was the research consultant on the 2014 supernatural horror film, The Woman in Black: Angel of Death.
