= Peter Davies (economic historian) =

British economic historian (1927–2020)

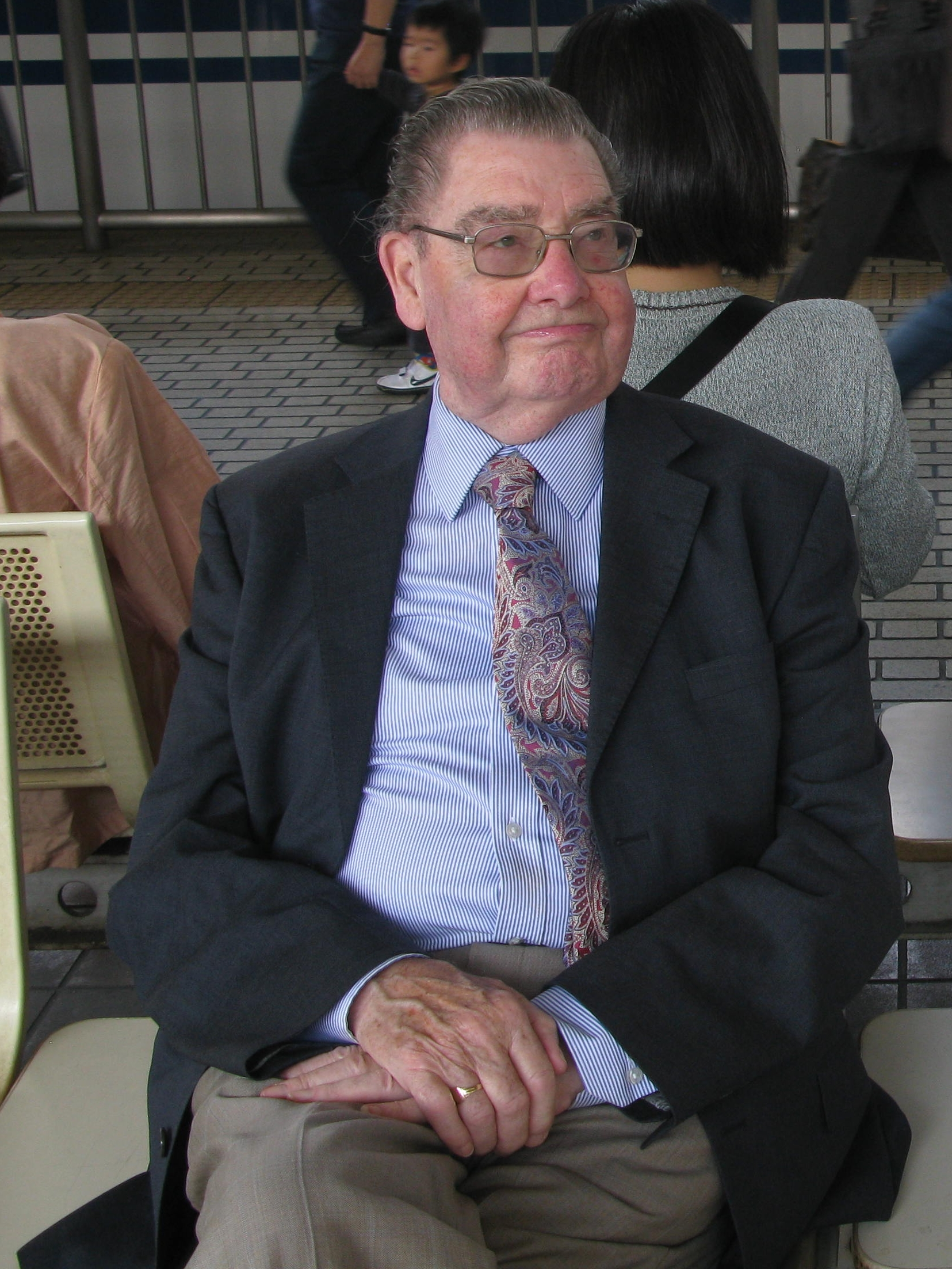
Peter Davies in Tokyo, Japan, October 2011

Peter N. Davies (born in Birkenhead on 14 July 1927, died in Caldy, Wirral on 19 March 2020) was a British economic historian with interests in the port of Liverpool, sea-based trade with West Africa, the Canary Islands and Japan, the international fruit trade and the military history of the River Kwai campaign in World War II. He was an Emeritus Professor in the School of History at the University of Liverpool, England.

Davies was the author of several books, including "The Trade Makers, Elder Dempster in West Africa" (Allen and Unwin, 1973), "Trading in West Africa" (Croom Helm, 1976), "Sir Alfred Jones: Shipping Entrepreneur par Excellence" (Europa, 1978), "Fyffes and the Banana, Musa Sapientum" (Athlone Press, 1990), "Japanese Shipping and Shipbuilding Industries: A History of Their Modern Growth" (with T. Chida, Athlone Press, 1990), "The Man Behind the Bridge: Colonel Toosey and the River Kwai" (Athlone Press, 1991), and "From Orchard to Market" (with D.Hope-Mason, Lockwood Press, 2005).

During a long career at the University of Liverpool which began in 1958 when he entered as an undergraduate in the Department of Commerce and Economics, Davies studied Economic History with a focus on maritime affairs, in the department later known as "Economic and Social History". Prior to studying at Liverpool he had acquired a teaching diploma at St John's College, York (which later became York St John University). He became Acting Head of Department at the University of Liverpool in 1979 and was Head of Department from 1980–89, after which he was awarded a personal Chair. Davies continued the tradition of commitment to Maritime History which had been initiated by Francis Hyde and maintained by John Harris (subsequently Professor of Economic History at the University of Birmingham) and Sheila Marriner. Taken together, Hyde, Harris, Marriner and Davies have become known as the "Liverpool School of Maritime Historians". His interests in the maritime affairs of Japan resulted in Visiting Professor appointments at Musashi University, Tokyo in 1979 and at Hiroshima Shudo University from 1990 to 1991.

"The Business, Life and Letters of Frederick Cornes : Aspects of the Evolution of Commerce in Modern Japan, 1861-1912" (Global Oriental: ISBN 1-905246-34-X) was published in September 2008. In this book Davies examined the surprisingly well-preserved papers of Frederick Cornes, a merchant from Cheshire, England who spent much of his life trading in Japan's port city of Yokohama during and after the Meiji Restoration, including the entire correspondence of "Cornes and Company" extending over a forty-year period in the early years of Anglo-Japanese trade.

Davies's last book, "Across the Three Pagodas Pass: The Story of the Thai-Burma Railway" (Renaissance Books: ISBN 978-1-898823-07-0), was published in August 2013. Davies acted as editor to Ewart Escritt's translation of the personal records of Japanese Railway Engineer Yoshihiko Futamatsu. Davies had come to know Futamatsu through his research for the 1991 biography of Philip Toosey "The Man Behind the Bridge" and secured his agreement that his memoirs could be published in English after his death. The book is therefore a rare account from the Japanese viewpoint of the construction of the Thai-Burma Railway (and the River Kwai Bridge) during World War II.
