= Visuttharangsi School =

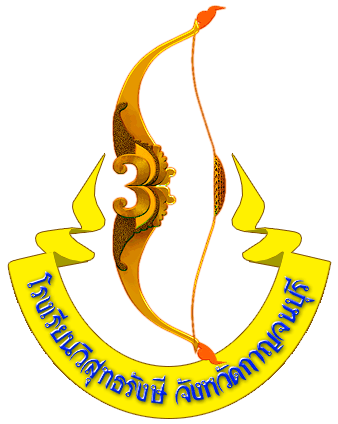

Location
- 32, Saeng ChuTo Rd, Tha Muang District; Kanchanaburi, 71000; Thailand
- Coordinates: 14.0°N 99.55°E

Information
- Type: Public
- Motto: Sūkā sāñgkāssā sāmākkī (Esprit de corps of staff originates the happiness)
- Established: 1 June 1904
- Founder: The Priest Plieant Inthasaro
- School board: Kanchanaburi Education Service Area Office 1
- Authority: Office of the Basic Education Commission
- Oversight: Ministry of Education
- Director: Siwarat Payuha
- Grades: 7–12 (mathayom 1–6)
- Gender: Coeducational
- Age range: 12 - 18
- Enrollment: Approx. 2,800 (2005 academic year)
- Hours in school day: 7 - 8
- Campus: Kanchanaburi, Suburban Area
- Colours: Blue and Yellow
- Song: March of Visttharangsi
- Website: http://www.visut.ac.th

Visuttharangsi School (Thai: โรงเรียนวิสุทธรังษี, pronounced [wí sùt tʰá rāŋ sǐː], abbr. V.S.) (known colloquially as Visut) is a public school in Thailand. This school belongs to the Kanchanaburi Education Service Area Office 1, Office of the Basic Education Commission (OBEC), Ministry of Education. The school provides preparatory school for college and university from grades 7 to 12. It admits both Thai and International students equivalent to the secondary students (mathayom 1–3, equivalent to grades 7–9) and upper-secondary students (mathayom 4–6, equivalent to grades 10–12). It was founded in 1904 as the provincial secondary school of Kanchanaburi Province and it is among the top 100 secondary schools of Thailand.

== Campus ==
Visuttharangsi School is located at 32 Saeng Chu To Rd, Thalo, Tha Muang District, Kanchanaburi Province, Thailand. The school is covered with reinforced concrete and includes seven main buildings and several additional buildings.

In 1974, a second campus was created. Located in Thong Pha Phum District, Kanchanaburi, the second school was named "Visuttharangsi School (Thong Pha Phum Campus)". Afterwards, Visuttharangsi School (Thong Pha Phum Campus) was renamed as "Thongphaphumwitthaya School" and has become the district school of Thong Pha Phum District.

== Identities and uniqueness ==
The Identities.

- The Bow;

The Bow is an establisher's emblem of Visuttharangsi. The emblem conveys "To endeavour to the intended goal".

- Pipal or Bohd tree;

The tree has been growing before the school was founded. It can hint at the Annual Academy Graduation of students and the admittance of news students from others.

- Blue and Yellow;
  - Blue indicates "The sign of Joyfulness."
  - Yellow indicates "The sign of Eternal Progression."

The uniqueness.

- The motto: "Sukhā saṅghassa sāmaggī" (สุขา สงฺฆสฺส สามคฺคี);

This is Pali - Sanskrit motto, it means "Esprit de corps of staff originates the happiness".

== Courses and majors ==
Visuttharangsi School provides an Intensive Program (IP), an English Program (EP) and Science - Mathematics courses following The Capital for Improvement Potentiality Project of International Bank for Reconstruction and Development (IBRD) a.k.a. "World Bank".

Grades 7–9 (Mathayom 1–3):

- Science - Mathematics Intensive Program. (SMTE., PSMTE.)
- Science - Technology Intensive Program. (I.P.)
- Science - Mathematics Course.
- English Program School. (EP.) (for International and Non-International Students)

Grades 10–12 (Mathayom 4–6):

- Mini English Program School. (MEP.) (for International and Non-International Students)
  - Arts - Math (Mathematics - English)
- Science - Mathematics. (For Non - International Students only)
- Arts - Math (Mathematics - English) (For Non-International Students only)
- Arts - Foreign Languages. (For Non-International Students only)
  - Chinese
  - Vietnamese
  - Japanese
  - Bruneian
  - French. (This major is currently unavailable)
  - Burmese
- Thai language and Social studies. (For Non - International Students only)
- Business Management. (For Non - International Students only)

Note: Science - Mathematics and Arts - Math Major seem to be the most popular in Thailand.

== Notable alumni ==
- Boonpong Sirivejjabhandu, war hero named Boonpong of Deathrailway
- Chit Phumisak, a Thai author, philologist, historian, poet and Communist rebel
- Prof. Dr. Prawase Wasi, a winner of the Ramon Magsaysay Award
- Phra Bhavanaviriyakhun, thai buddhist monk
- Pramote Teerawiwatana, former Thailand badminton player
- Sattawat Sethakorn, film actor
- Weluree Ditsayabut, Miss Universe Thailand 2014
