= The Bridge over the River Kwai =

1952 novel by Pierre Boulle

- First edition (French)
- Author: Pierre Boulle
- Original title: Le Pont de la rivière Kwaï
- Language: French
- Genre: War novel
- Publisher: Julliard
- Publication date: 1952
- Publication place: France
- English publication date: 1954 (Vanguard Press)
- Media type: Print (Hardback & Paperback)

The Bridge over the River Kwai (French: Le Pont de la rivière Kwaï) is a novel by the French novelist Pierre Boulle, published in French in 1952 and English translation by Xan Fielding in 1954. The story is historical fiction, with the construction of the Burma Railway in 1942–1943 as its setting; it is partly based on Pierre Boulle's own life experience working in rubber plantations in Malaya and later working for allied forces in Singapore and French Indochina during the Second World War. The novel deals with the plight of World War II British prisoners of war forced by the Imperial Japanese Army (IJA) to build a bridge for the "Death Railway", so named because of the large number of prisoners and conscripts who died during its construction. The novel won France's Prix Sainte-Beuve in 1952.

== Historical context ==
The largely fictitious plot is based on the building in 1942 of one of the railway bridges over the Mae Klong river—renamed Khwae Yai in the 1960s—at a place called Tha Ma Kham, 5 kilometres (3.1 mi) from the Thai town of Kanchanaburi.

According to the Commonwealth War Graves Commission:

"The notorious Burma-Siam railway, built by Commonwealth, Dutch and American prisoners of war, was a Japanese project driven by the need for improved communications to support the large Japanese army in Burma. During its construction, approximately 13,000 prisoners of war died and were buried along the railway. An estimated 80,000 to 100,000 civilians also died in the course of the project, chiefly forced labour brought from Malaya and the Dutch East Indies, or conscripted in Siam (Thailand) and Burma (Myanmar). Two labour forces, one based in Siam and the other in Burma, worked from opposite ends of the line towards the centre."

Boulle had been a prisoner of the Japanese in Southeast Asia and his story of collaboration was based on his experience with some French officers. However, he chose instead to use British officers in his book.

== Plot summary ==
The story describes the use of prisoners in the POW camp to build the bridge and how a separate team of experts from 'Force 316' based in Calcutta were sent to sabotage the bridge.

Lt. Colonel Nicholson marches his men into Prisoner of War Camp 16, commanded by Colonel Saito. Saito announces that the prisoners will be required to work on construction of a bridge over the River Kwai so that the railroad connection between Bangkok and Rangoon can be completed. Saito also demands that all men, including officers, will do manual labor. In response to this, Nicholson informs Saito that, under the Hague Conventions (1899 and 1907), officers cannot be required to do hard work. Saito reiterates his demand and Nicholson remains adamant in his refusal to submit his officers to manual labor. Because of Nicholson's unwillingness to back down, he and his officers are placed in the "ovens"—small, iron boxes sitting in the heat of day. Eventually, Nicholson's stubbornness forces Saito to relent.

Construction of the bridge serves as a symbol of the preservation of professionalism and personal integrity to one prisoner, Colonel Nicholson, a proud perfectionist. Pitted against Colonel Saito, the warden of the Japanese POW camp, Nicholson will nevertheless, out of a distorted sense of duty, aid his enemy. As the Allies, on the outside, race to destroy the bridge, Nicholson must decide which to sacrifice: his patriotism or his pride.

== Historicity ==
The incidents portrayed in the book are mostly fictional, and though it depicts bad conditions and suffering caused by the building of the Burma Railway and its bridges, the reality was appalling. Historically, the conditions were much worse. The real-world senior Allied officer at the bridge was British Lieutenant Colonel Philip Toosey. On a BBC Timewatch programme, a former prisoner at the camp states that it is unlikely that a man like the fictional Nicholson could have risen to the rank of lieutenant colonel; and if he had, he would have been "quietly eliminated" by the other prisoners. Julie Summers, in her book The Colonel of Tamarkan, writes that Pierre Boulle, who had been a prisoner of war in Thailand, created the fictional Nicholson character as an amalgam of his memories of collaborating French officers. Boulle outlined the psychological reasoning which led him to conceive the character of Nicholson in an interview which forms part of the 1969 BBC2 documentary "Return to the River Kwai" made by former POW John Coast. A transcript of the interview and the documentary as a whole can be found in the new edition of John Coast's book "Railroad of Death".

Unlike the fictional Nicholson, Toosey was not a collaborator with the Japanese. Toosey, in fact, delayed building the bridge by obstruction. Whereas Nicholson disapproves of acts of sabotage and other deliberate attempts to delay progress, Toosey encouraged this: termites were collected in large numbers to eat the wooden structures, and the concrete was badly mixed.

== Film adaptation ==
The novel was made into the 1957 film The Bridge on the River Kwai, directed by David Lean, which won the 1957 Academy Award for Best Picture. This film was shot in Sri Lanka (then called Ceylon), and a bridge was erected for the purpose of shooting the film over Kelani River at Kitulgala, Sri Lanka.

The film was relatively faithful to the novel, with two major exceptions. Shears, who is a British commando officer like Warden in the novel, became an American sailor who escapes from the POW camp. Also, in the novel, the bridge is not destroyed: the train plummets into the river from a secondary charge placed by Warden, but Nicholson (never realising "what have I done?") does not fall onto the plunger, and the bridge suffers only minor damage. Boulle nonetheless enjoyed the film version though he disagreed with its climax.

After the film was released, the Thais faced a problem as thousands of tourists came to see the 'bridge over the River Kwai', but no such bridge existed due to Boulle's aforementioned misassumption. As the film and book meant to 'portray' the bridge over the Mae Klong, the Thai authorities officially renamed the river. The Mae Klong is now called the Kwae Yai ('Big Kwae') for several miles north of the confluence with the Kwae Noi ('Little Kwae'), including the section under the bridge.

== Parody ==
In 1962 Spike Milligan and Peter Sellers, with Peter Cook and Jonathan Miller, released the record The Bridge on the River Wye, a spoof of the film version of Kwai based around the 1957 Goon Show "An African Incident". It was intended to have the same name as the film, but shortly before its release, the film company threatened legal action if the name was used. Producer George Martin edited out the "K" every time the word "Kwai" was spoken.

== See also ==
- Through the Valley of the Kwai, an autobiographical account by Ernest Gordon
