= Siam-Burma Death Railway =

Siam Burma Death Railway Documentary Film
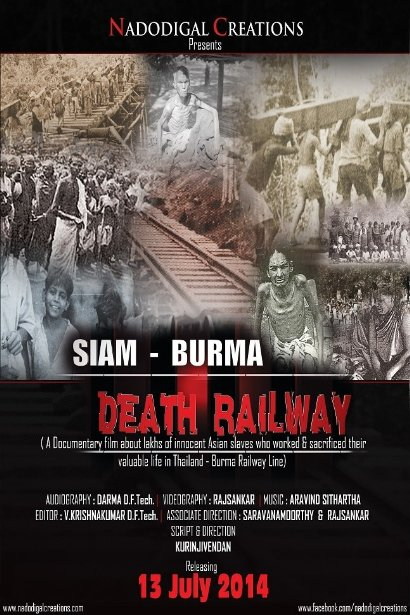
- Siam Burma Death Railway Documentary Film
- Directed by: Kurinji Vendan
- Written by: Kurinji Vendan
- Produced by: Nadodigal Creations
- Cinematography: Raj Sankar
- Edited by: Krishna Kumar
- Music by: Aravind Sithartha
- Production company: Jai Studio
- Release date: 13 July 2014 (Singapore)
- Running time: 65 minutes
- Country: Singapore
- Languages: English; Tamil
- Budget: SGD 55,000 (est)

Siam Burma Death Railway is a 2014 Singaporean documentary film written and directed by Kurinji Vendan about the Asian forced-laborers who worked on the Siam-Burma Death Railway during World War II.

== Synopsis ==
This documentary film opens with World War II war between the Allied forces, comprising America – Australia – Netherlands, under the leadership of Great Britain, fought against the Axis countries of Germany – Japan and Italy. One super-power, Japan, had been waiting for a long time, expecting an opportunity to realise its plan of creating a 'Greater Asia'. Japan's plan was to extend its empire to include Singapore, Malaya, Thailand and Burma up to India. On 15 Feb 1942, Singapore fell at the hands of Japan, which had begun the war in the name of Asian independence. Immediately, Japan decided to carry out its plans of creating a Greater Asia, basically an area under Japanese control. As a first step, Japan planned to lay the Siam – Burma railway line connecting Siam(i.e., Thailand) and Myanmar.

The Siam–Burma railway did not traverse benign terrain. It snaked through dark, deep valleys, climbed high mountain ranges and lengthy mountain passes, crossed great rivers and inhospitable rain forests. On 22 June 1942, the work of laying the railways began from Kanchanapuri, about 80 km away from Thailand's capital Bangkok and Thanbyuzayat about 55 miles away from Moulmein, a major city of south Burma. About 60,000 prisoners of war of Allied Forces guided by 12,000 Japanese engineers, began the work of laying the railway line for about 415 km.

After a few weeks, the Japanese army realized it needed millions of people to complete the project. The Japanese army was prepared to use dangerous methods to make the dream come true. Thousands of Indian Tamil and Burmese labourers working in the Malay rubber estates caught their attention and they were brought to Thanbyuzayat, with a promise of higher wages and comfortable stay. The labourers built wooden bridges in many places across river Kwai in order to lay the railway. The bridges were washed by the floods in the river. The labourers were forced to reconstruct the bridges. The labourers were fed with rice thrice a day, along with dried fish or murrel from the river.

The conditions endured by the POWs of the Allied Forces were worse. Dressed in loin clothes they looked like skeletons. They looked pitiable as they were affected by skin diseases. Unable to withstand the sufferings many of them died. The Japanese army buried them near the railway line and planted a cross bearing their names. It is a fact that no words can describe the manner in which the Japanese army treated the dead and the dying.

On 16 October 1943 both the lines met at a place called 3 Pagoda on the Siam-Burma frontier. The railway line measured about 300 km in Siam and 115 km in Burma. The Japanese army celebrated the valediction like a festival. They indulged in entertaining themselves with feasts and merry-making.

6 August 1945 is the last scene of this full length tragic movie about this episode in the Second World War. The Japanese industrial city of Hiroshima was bombarded by the USA on that day. The deeds of Japan were brought to an end with that incident. The POWs of the Allied Forces were released from all over the world. Once again the British flag flew high in the Singapore sky. The Japanese army stood silent in answer to the allegations of the court of war crime investigations. After listening to thousands of witnesses many of the officers and soldiers were branded as war criminals and were hanged to death.

The number of Asian labourers (Malaysian Tamils, Burmese, and Javanese) who died building the Death railway is estimated to be more than 100,000. According to the statistical data, the number of Tamil labourers who died during the construction should be about 60,000 and Burmese 30,000 in number. But researchers of World War II are of the opinion that the exact number of Asian labourers who died at the Death Railway is known only to the Japanese government.

== Release ==
This documentary movie was released and screened in Paris on 5 July 2014. Subsequently, released in London on 13 July 2014.

Malaysia release will be on 12 Oct 2014.

== Production ==
The team film this documentary for new generation become. Devoted nearly 10 years to unraveling the hidden facts about the death railway. The film focuses on the "survivors", those who worked the railway and lived to bear witness to the historical reality of this enduring atrocity.

A principal source of this documentary's strength are the views of researchers Dr David Boggett, Emeritus Professor, Kyoto University, Japan; Mr Rod Beattie, Director, Thai-Burma Railway Museum, Thailand, and Professor M. Annamalai, India.

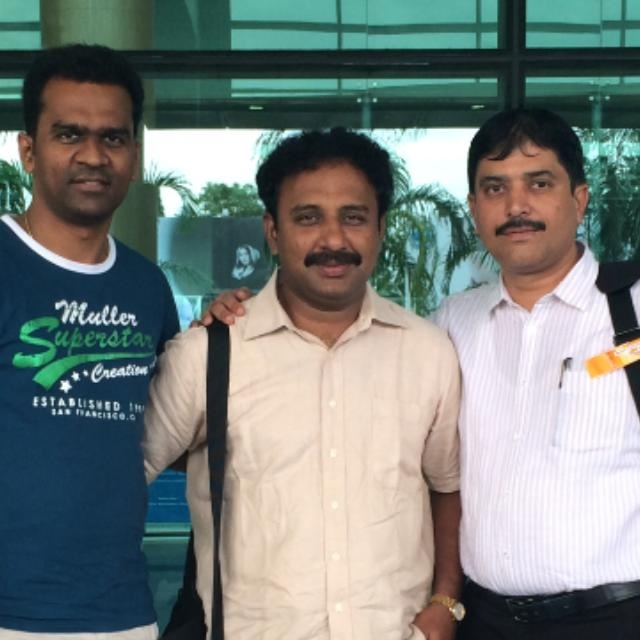
Nadodigal Creations Team

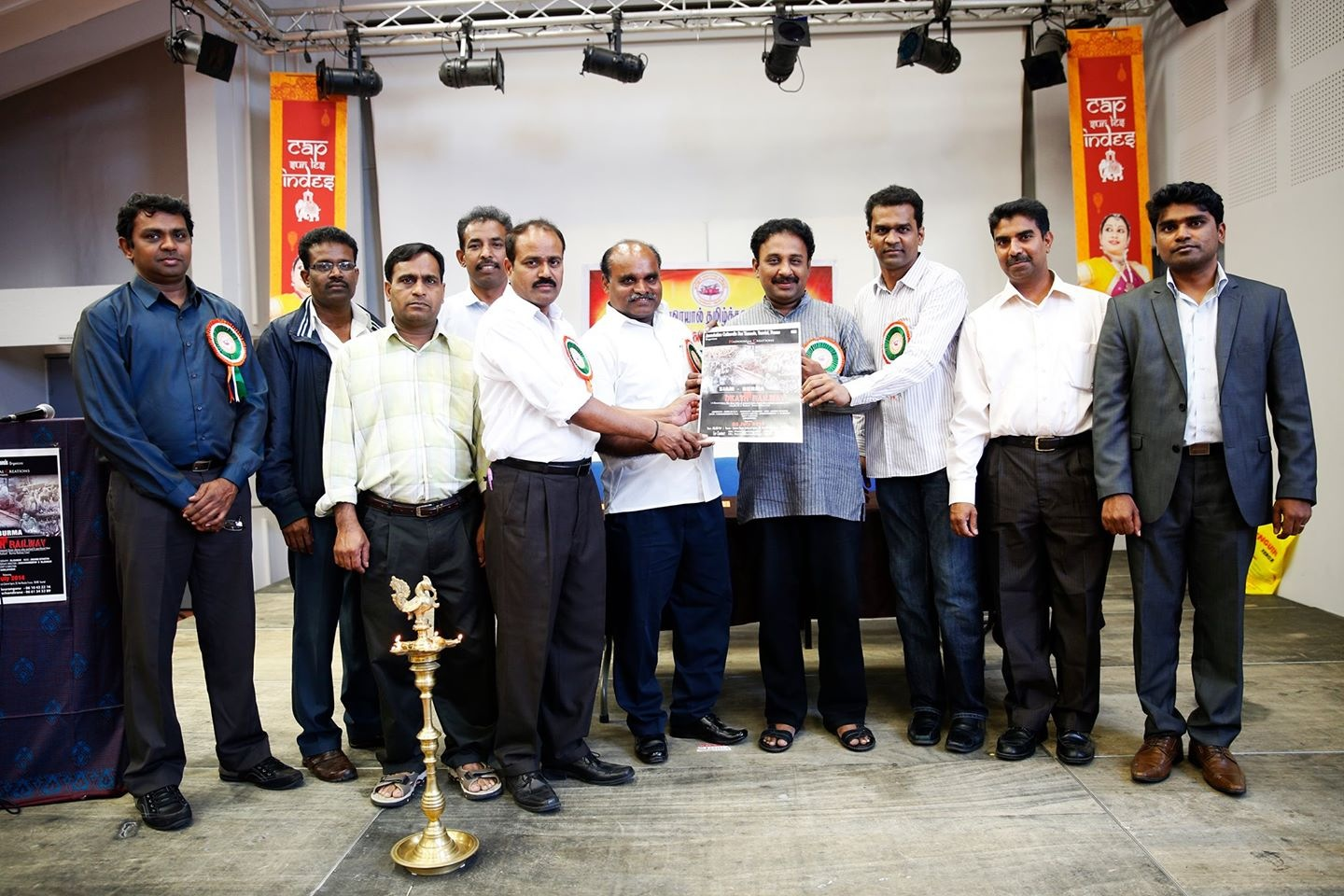
Release of Siam-Burma Death Railway, Paris

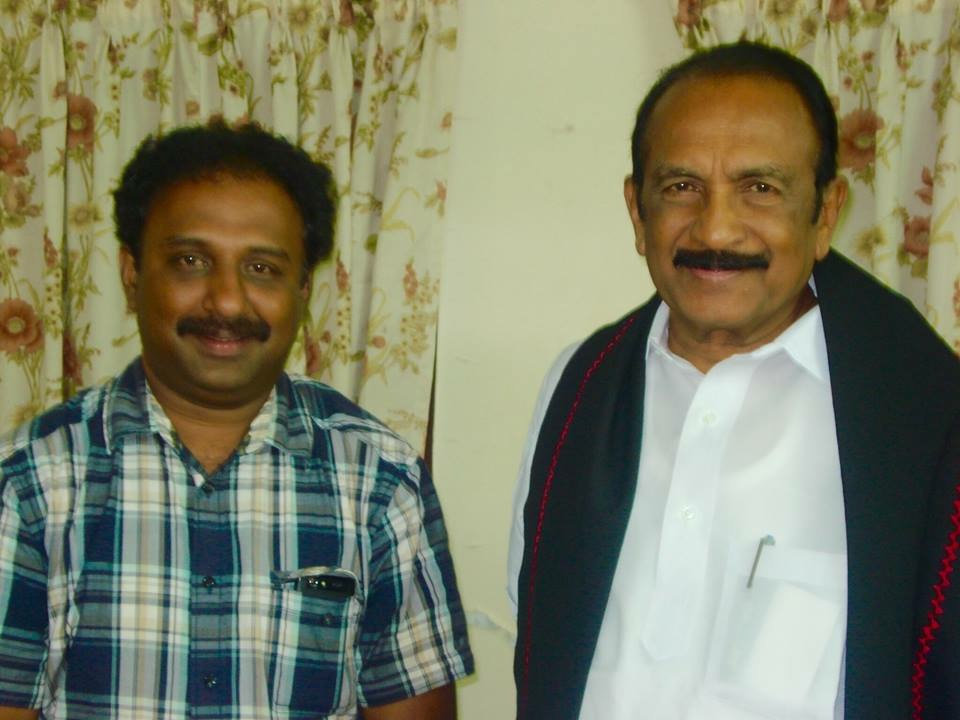
After screeing SIAM BURMA DEATH RAILWAY documentary film to Mr. Vaiko, Chennai

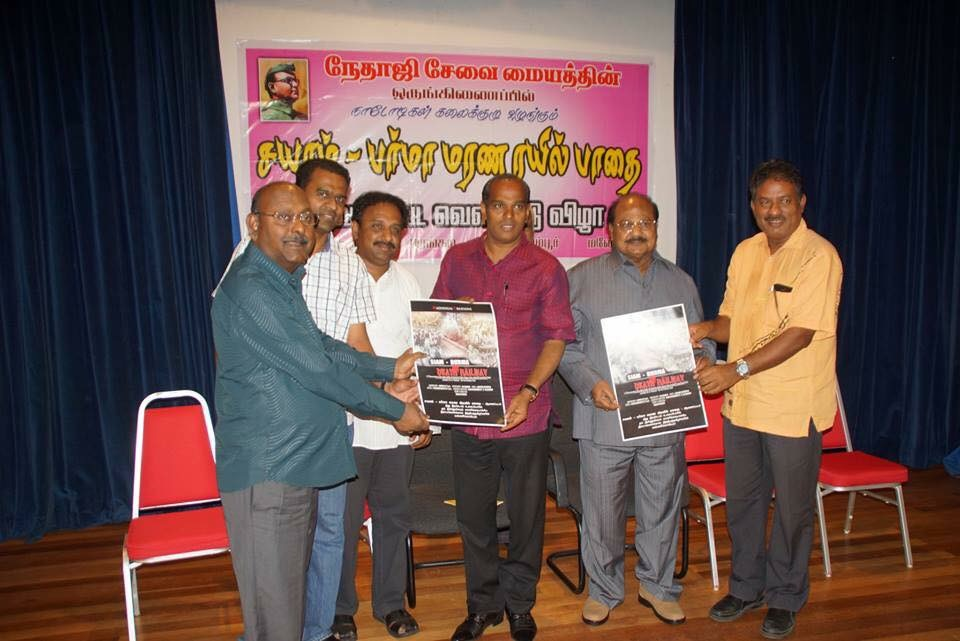
SIAM BURMA DEATH RAILWAY film release in Malaysia

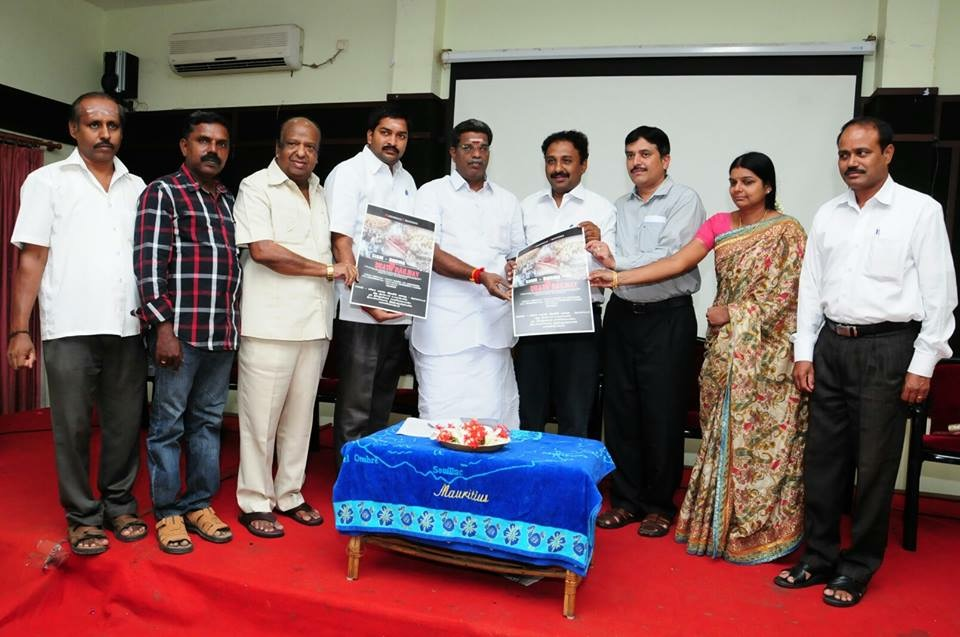
SIAM BURMA DEATH RAILWAY film release in Pondicherry

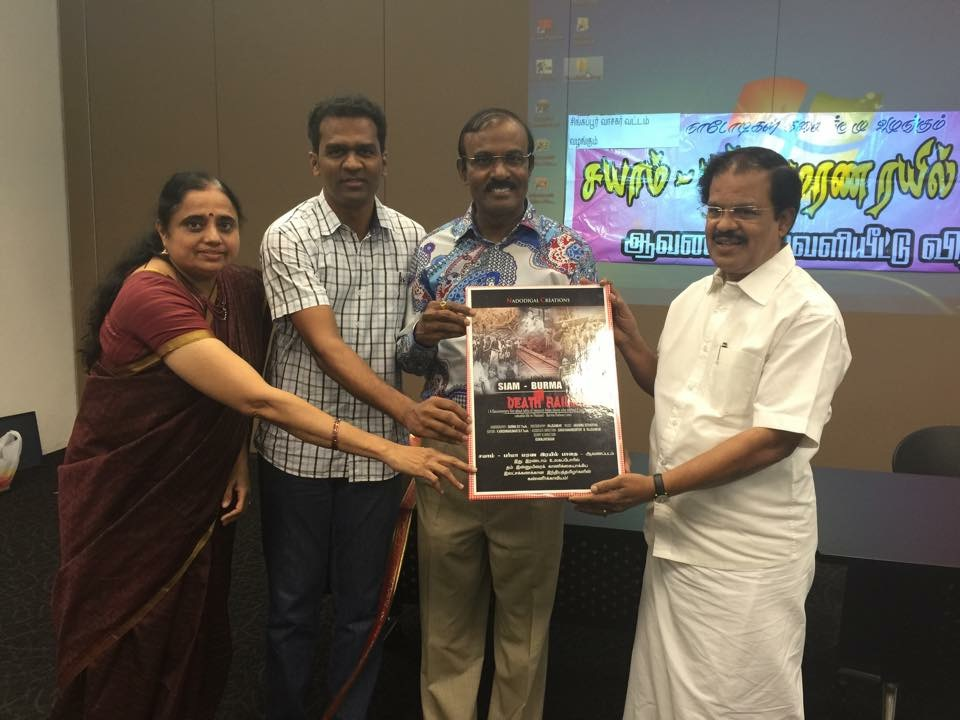
SIAM BURMA DEATH RAILWAY film release in Singapore

== Awards and nominations ==
- Nominations for Best Documentary 2015 Cinerockom Intl Film Festival, USA
- Silver Award for Best Documentary at IFCOM Festival, Indonesia
- Silver Award for Best Documentary at Filmmakers Of The Year Film Festival, Indonesia
- Official Selection for Best Documentary at CinemAvvenire Film Festival, Italy
- Official Selection, Mumbai International Film Festival, India
- Official Selection, 6th Ammar Popular Film Festival, Tehran, Iran

== Release News ==
- Pondicherry Release in Tamil Language
- Dinamalar News in Tamil Language
- The Asahi Shimbun, Japanese News Daily English Language
- Citizen Journalists Malaysia, Kuala Lumpur English Language
- Tamil Murasu Daily, Singapore Tamil Language
