= Chungkai War Cemetery =

War cemetery in Thailand

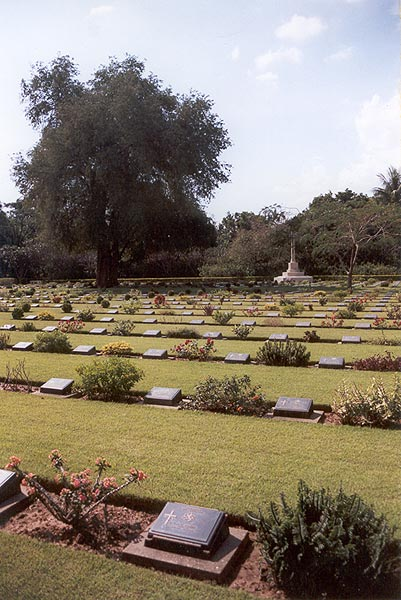
- War graves cemetery
- Interactive map of Chungkai War Cemetery

Details
- Location: Tha Ma Kham, Kanchanaburi
- Country: Thailand
- Coordinates: 14°00′19″N 99°30′53″E
- Type: Military Cemetery
- Owned by: Commonwealth War Graves Commission
- No. of graves: 1,692
- Find a Grave: Chungkai War Cemetery

Chungkai War Cemetery, also known as Chung Kai War Cemetery, is a war cemetery in Tha Ma Kham near Kanchanaburi, Thailand. Established in the 1950s, the cemetery hosts the graves of 1,426 British and 313 Dutch prisoners of war who died during World War II. It was originally a prisoner of war camp on the Burma Railway.

== Description ==
The cemetery at Chungkai hosts the graves of 1,426 British and 313 Dutch servicemen who died during World War II. The majority of the interred died building the sections of the nearby Burma Railway. The cemetery is built on the site of a prisoner of war camp used by the Japanese army to house Allied POWs during the conflict.

In 1946, it was decided to re-bury the Burma Railway deaths which were buried in many graveyards along the line in three large cemeteries. The current Chungkai cemetery is an extension of the existing camp cemetery. American POWs were repatriated back to the United States. The status of the Australian soldiers is unclear. One source describes Australians being buried at the cemetery, while another states no Australians are buried there. or that it only contains several non-military Australian prisoners. The cemetery was designed by Colin St Clair Oakes.

== Camp Chungkai ==
Chungkai (also: Thai No.2 Camp) was founded as a prisoner of war work camp. It was located 57 kilometres from the beginning of the line, at the edge of the jungle near the Mae Klong River. The first prisoners arrived in October 1942, and were tasked to work on the bridges at Tamarkan and the section up to Wun Lun, at kilometre 68. One of the tasks was the Chungkai cutting, a railway cutting through solid rock. In November 1942, a hospital was constructed at Chungkai. Chungkai was considered one of the best camps with sufficient food. The camp and hospital closed in June 1945. The hospital had treated 19,975 patients during its existence.

== See also ==
- Kanchanaburi War Cemetery
