= Camp Nong Pladuk =

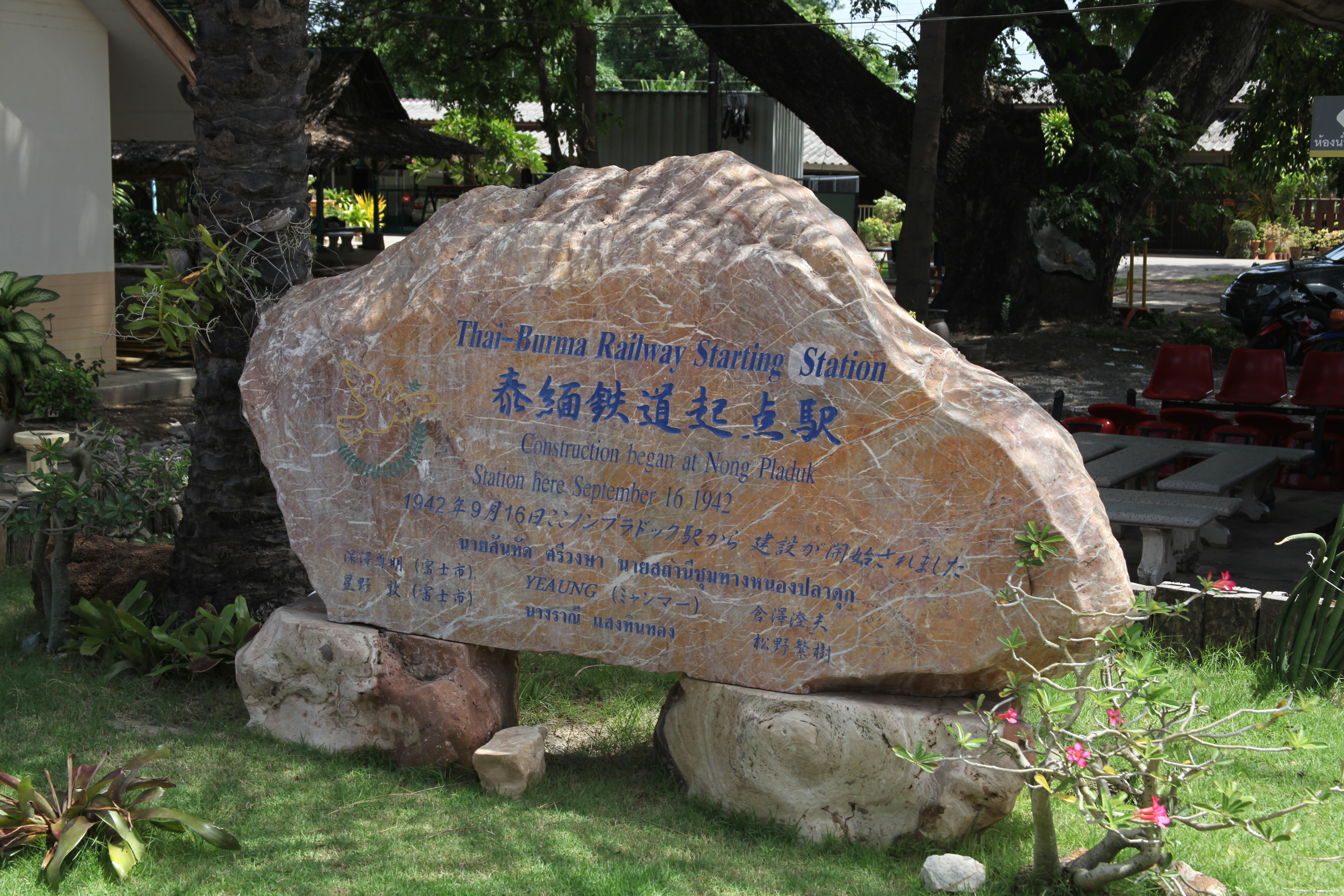
- Memorial stone at Nong Pladuk as the starting point of the Burma Railway

- Location within Thailand

General information
- Location: Ban Pong, Ratchaburi, Thailand
- Coordinates: 13.81733°N 99.91075°E
- Construction started: 1942

Camp Nong Pladuk (also: Nompuradokku) was a Japanese prisoner of war transit camp during World War II. It was located about five kilometres from the main railway station of Ban Pong near a junction station on the Southern Line to Bangkok. Nong Pladuk served as the starting point of the Burma Railroad. Numerous British, Dutch, and allied troops passed through Nong Pladuk to construct the railroad. Nowadays, it serves as a rail road maintenance and repair facility.

== History ==
In 1939, plans had been developed by the Empire of Japan to construct a railway connecting Thailand with Burma. Nong Pladuk was chosen as the starting point, because it was the location of rail yard on the Southern Line to Bangkok. A camp was constructed to the north of the railway.

On 23 June 1942, the first 600 British prisoners arrived from the First Mainland Party led by Major R.S. Sykes of the 18th Infantry Division. The first groups were tasked to clear the forest, built the shelters, and a Japanese workshop.

The barracks were made of wood with bamboo matting, and contained 200 to 300 prisoners each. There were originally six huts, a cook house with Chinese, British and Dutch canteens, a bamboo church, Japanese quarters and a guardroom. The camp was originally built to house 2,000 prisoners, but was gradually enlarged for 8,000 prisoners. On 16 September 1942, railway construction started at both ends of the planned line.

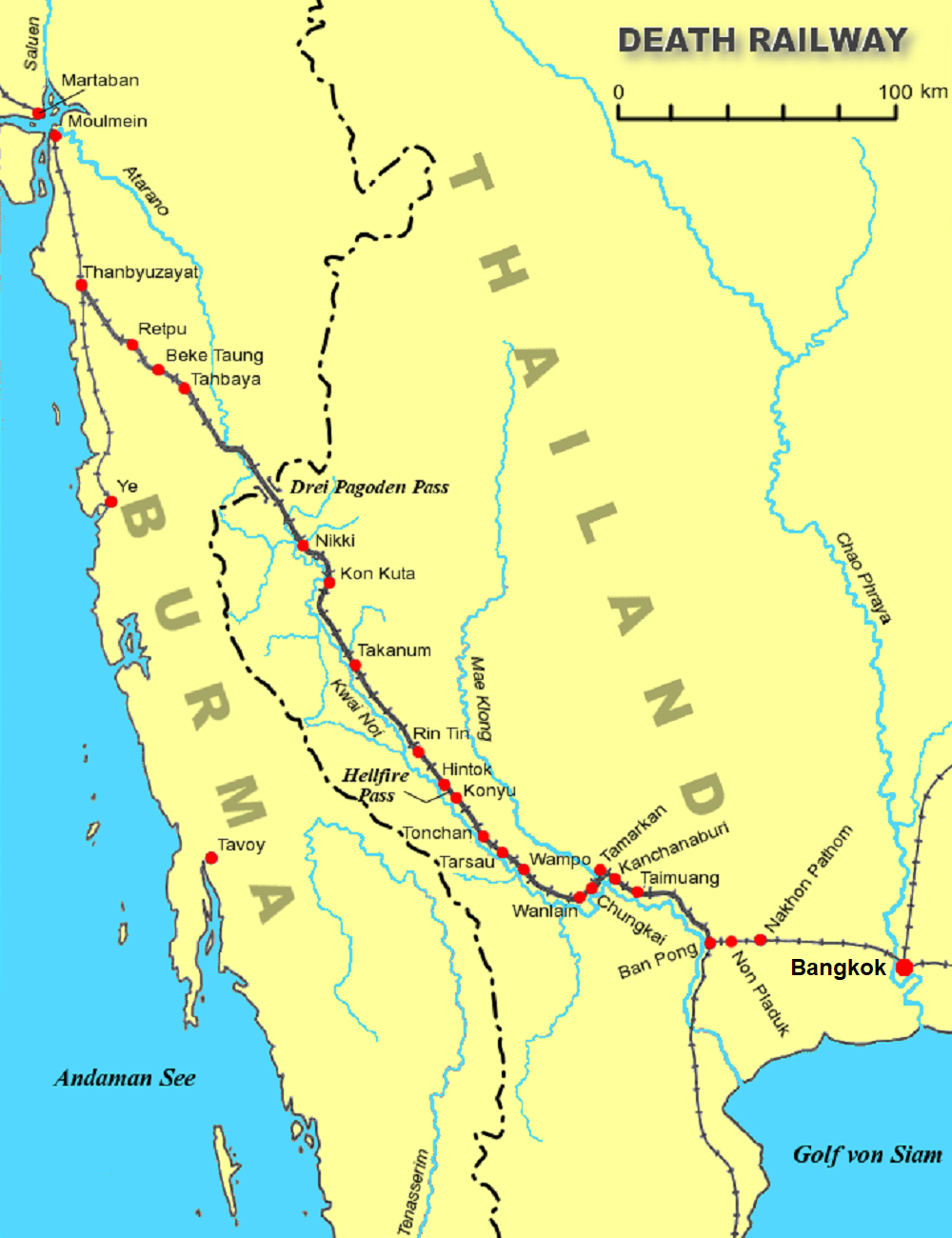
Thai-Burma Railway. Nong Pladuk is on the bottom right

Camp Nong Pladuk was initially used as a transit camp from where the prisoners were transported or had to walk to work camps along the Burma Railway. Later Nong Pladuk was also used a revalidation camp. The work camps were numbered according to the distance in kilometres from Nong Pladuk.

During World War II, at least 23,289 British, 12,329 Dutch, 4,708 Australian, 482 American, and 7,030 undetermined soldiers passed through the camp. Of the 61,811 prisoners deployed on both sides of the railway line, 12,619 died. Of the estimated 177,700 civilian forced laborers deployed, 85,400 died.

In December 1943, a second camp was constructed at Nong Pladuk. The British, Australian and American prisoners were housed in Camp I while Camp II was used for the Dutch prisoners. The proximity to a large rail yard implied it was a target for allied bombers. On 6 September 1944, the camp was hit by five bombs resulting in 92 deaths and 70 wounded. The camp closed on 22 February 1945. Nowadays, the camp is used as a rail road maintenance and repair facility.

There were two large cemeteries to the north-east of the camp. After the war, the bodies were re-buried at the Chungkai and the Kanchanaburi War Cemeteries except for the Americans who were repatriated back to the United States.
