= Srinagarind Dam =

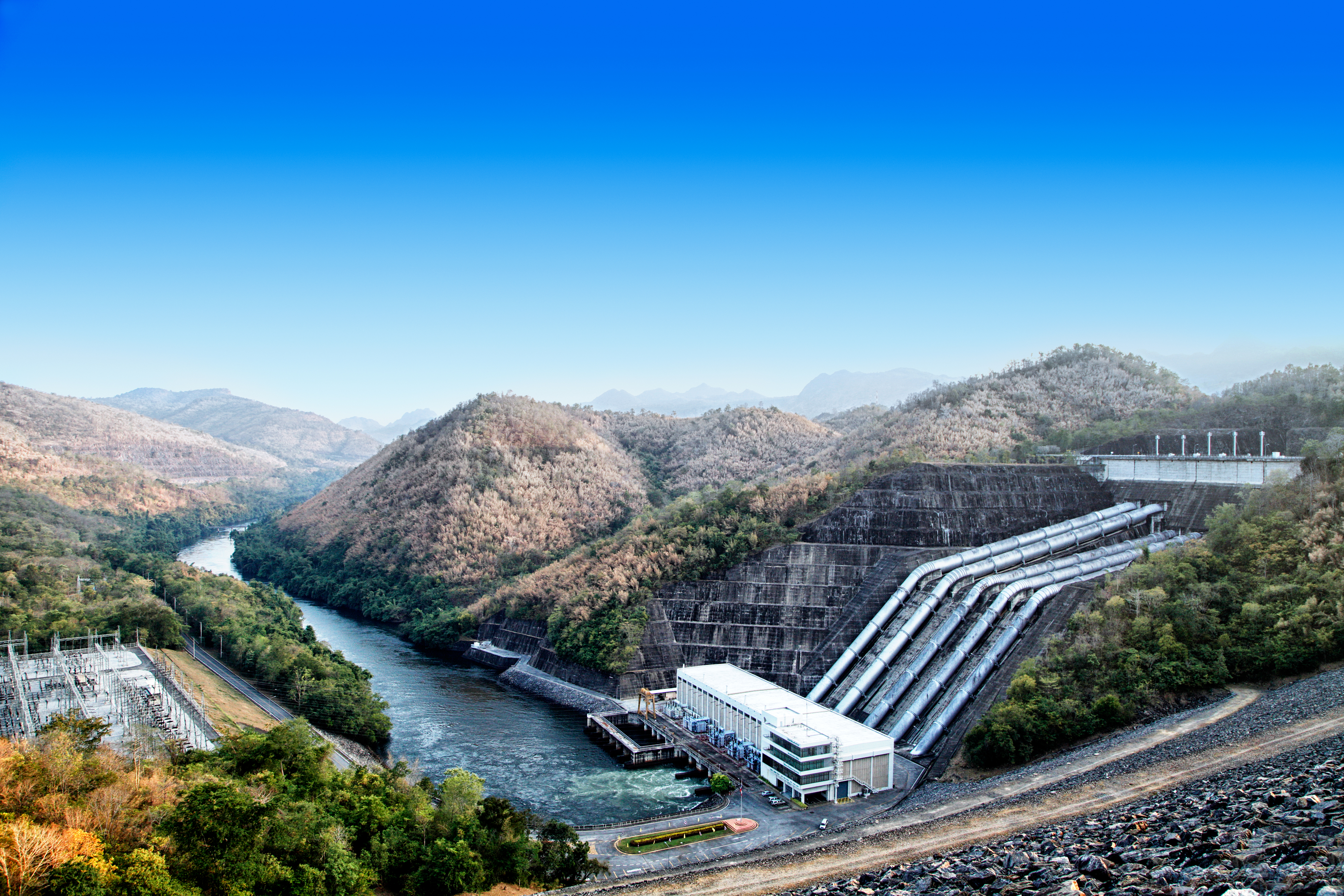
- Power station

- Location within Thailand
- Country: Thailand
- Location: Si Sawat, Kanchanaburi
- Coordinates: 14°24′31″N 99°07′42″E
- Status: In use
- Construction began: 1974
- Opening date: 1980
- Owner: Electricity Generating Authority of Thailand

Dam and spillways
- Type of dam: Embankment
- Impounds: Khwae Yai
- Height: 140 m (460 ft)
- Length: 610 m (2,000 ft)

Reservoir
- Creates: Srinagarind Reservoir
- Total capacity: 17,745,000,000 m^{3} (14,386,106 acre⋅ft)

Power Station
- Commission date: 1980–1991
- Turbines: 3 × 120 MW (160,000 hp) Francis-type, 2 × 180 MW (240,000 hp) Francis pump-turbine.
- Installed capacity: 720 MW (970,000 hp)
- Annual generation: 1,160 gigawatt-hours (4,200 TJ)

The Srinagarind Dam (also known as the Srinakarin Dam; Thai: เขื่อนศรีนครินทร์, RTGS: Khuean Si Nakharin, pronounced [kʰɯ̀an sǐː ná(ʔ).kʰā.rīn]) is an embankment dam on the Khwae Yai River in Si Sawat District of Kanchanaburi Province, Thailand. The purposes of the dam are river regulation and hydroelectric power generation. The dam's power station has a 720 megawatts (970,000 hp) capacity of which 360 megawatts (480,000 hp) is pumped storage. The dam was named after Princess Srinagarindra.

== Background ==
Feasibility studies for the dam were carried out between May 1967 and May 1969 and designs from September 1970 to December 1977. Construction began in 1974 and it was completed in 1980. The first of the dam's generators was commissioned in 1980 and the last in 1991. The original cost of the dam was estimated to be US$45 million but because the dam was constructed on a fault line, the dam's foundation had to be reinforced which raised the cost to US$114 million.

== Design ==
The Srinagarind Dam is a 140 metres (460 ft) tall and 610 metres (2,000 ft) long embankment dam. It contains a reservoir with a capacity of 17,745 million cubic metres (14.386×10^{6} acre⋅ft). The dam's power station has an installed capacity of 720 MW and contains three 120 megawatts (160,000 hp) Francis turbines and two 180 MW Francis pump-turbines. The pump-turbines serve the dam's pumped-storage capability and generate electricity during peak hours. In off-peak hours, the pump turbines return water from the lower reservoir back into the upper reservoir.

== See also ==
- List of power stations in Thailand
- Vajiralongkorn Dam - upstream
