= Kanchanaburi Rajabhat University =

University in Kanchanaburi, Thailand

Coordinates: 14.0623°N 99.4246°E

- มหาวิทยาลัยราชภัฏกาญจนบุรี
- Motto: "Master yourself before you can master other people"
- Type: Public
- Established: 29 September 1973; 51 years ago
- Chairman: Assoc.Prof.Dr Narong Yoothanom
- President: Dr Narongdech Rattananonsathien
- Location: Kanchanaburi, Thailand
- Campus: Kanchanaburi (Main Campus), Kanchana School, Suphan Buri
- Colours: Golden yellow
- Website: www.kru.ac.th

Kanchanaburi Rajabhat University (KRU) (Thai: มหาวิทยาลัยราชภัฏกาญจนบุรี) is a Thai public university under the Rajabhat University system. The campus is just outside Kanchanaburi.

== History ==
On 29 September 1973, KRU was first established as the Kanchanaburi Teachers College, where it was a teacher's college. Under the Teacher College Act of 1975, the Faculty of Education, and the Faculty of Humanities and Social Sciences were promulgated on 14 February 1975. Together, the two faculties contained 17 departments. The college opened to its first academic year in 1976.

In 1977, it upgraded the Department of Educational Technology and Innovation into the Faculty of Science and Technology and contained 9 departments. In 1978, the college's teaching courses at the Diploma of Higher Education level began offering six majors.

In 1984, the Teacher College Act was amended to allow diploma and bachelor's degree programs in fields other than education to be taught at teacher's colleges in Thailand. Following this, the Faculty of Science was established. On 24 January 1995, the Rajabhat Institute Act was promulgated by King Bhumibol Adulyadej and resulted in the Kanchanaburi Teachers College being upgraded to the Kanchanaburi Rajabhat Institute. Following the Rajabhat University Act 2004, Kanchanaburi Rajabhat Institute was upgraded on 15 June 2004 to what it currently is, Kanchanaburi Rajabhat University.

== Faculties ==
=== Faculty of Education ===
The Faculty of Education is the oldest faculty at KRU.

=== Faculty of Social Science and Humanity ===
Business English Subjects

Mass Media One

=== Faculty of Industrial Technology ===
The Faculty of Industrial Technology is the newest faculty in KRU. It grew from a department of the Faculty of Science and Technology. It is intended to educate people in practical science fields.
