= Boonpong Sirivejjabhandu =

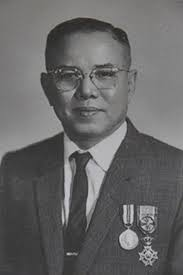
Boonpong sirivejjabhandu

Boonpong Sirivejjabhandu (Thai: บุญผ่อง สิริเวชชะพันธ์; RTGS: Bunphong Siriwetchaphan, 21 April 1906 – 29 January 1982) widely known as Boon Pong was a Thai merchant and member of the underground "V" organization during the Japanese occupation of Thailand during World War II.

== World War II ==
Boon Pong, using as cover his contract with the Imperial Japanese Army to supply the camps of Allied POWs working on the Burma Railway in Kanchanaburi, smuggled medicine, money and contraband food to the POWs and is credited by many with saving thousands of lives during the building of the railway.

Although Thailand was officially allied with the Japanese, there was an active underground movement. One prisoner recalls Boonpong was the merchant with the lowest prices and the smallest mark up. However he performed other services risking his life and those of his family. He lent money, provided extra medicines and ran messages. With access to medicines, the death rate of the prisoners was reduced from five a day in May 1943 to one a week by the following November.

== Post-war ==
After the war, Boonpong was attacked by Thai police in some mistaken retribution. Sir Edward "Weary" Dunlop, another hero of the POW camps, ordered a report on 'the condition of Mr. Boonpong, injured Thai civilian, who had done so much for prisoners of war.’ In 1947 he was in financial difficulties and so a POW association on hearing of it organised a collection for him. Shortly thereafter, Boonpong started the Boonpong Bus Company. He was awarded the British King's Medal for Courage in the Cause of Freedom and named an officer of the Dutch Order of Orange-Nassau.

Later an Australian medical scholarship was named in honor of him and Sir Edward Dunlop. The documentary film “The Quiet Lions” is about both of them. Boonpong also figures prominently in Beyond the Bamboo Screen, a collection of anecdotes by Scottish PoWs.

== In popular culture ==
Ruangsak Loychusak portrayed Boonpong Sirivejjabhandu in Boon Pong a thai television soap opera based on him. Boon Pong was broadcast on Thai PBS from 8 May 2013 to 20 June 2013.

== See also ==
- Philip Toosey
