= Khwae Yai River =

River in Kanchanaburi province, Thailand

Coordinates: 14.0182°N 99.5277°E

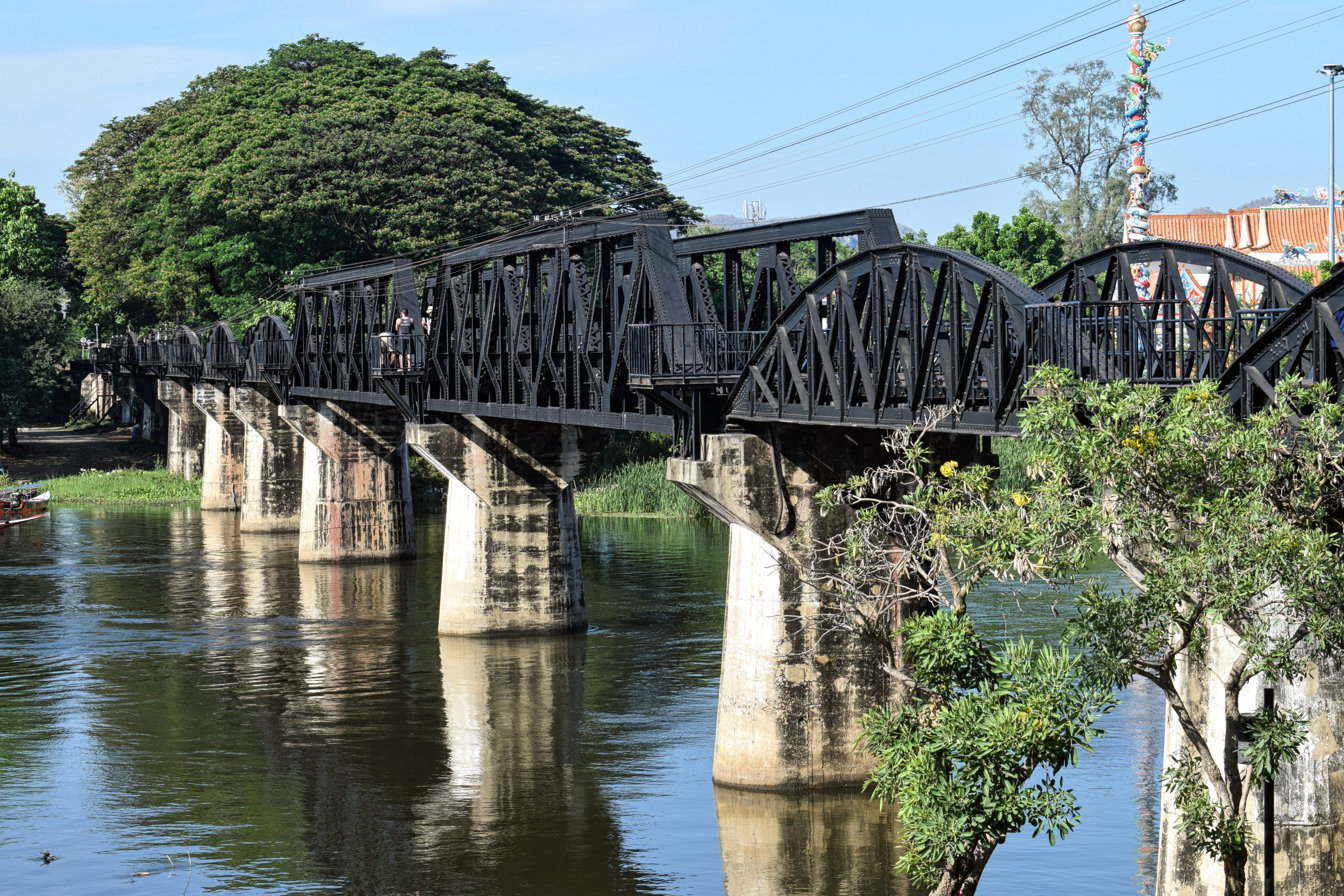
- The bridge of the Burma Railway crosses the river at the town of Kanchanaburi.
- Native name: แม่น้ำแควใหญ่ (Thai)

Location
- Country: Thailand

Physical characteristics
- Source
  - location: Umphang District
- Mouth
  - location: Kanchanaburi
- Length: 380 km (240 mi)

Basin features
- River system: Mae Klong

The Khwae Yai River (Thai: แม่น้ำแควใหญ่, RTGS: Maenam Khwae Yai, IPA: [mɛ̂ːnáːm kʰwɛː jàj]), also known as the Si Sawat (แม่น้ำศรีสวัสดิ์ [mɛ̂ː náːm sǐː sa.wàt]), is a river in western Thailand. It has its source in the Tenasserim Hills and flows for about 380 kilometres (240 mi) through Sangkhla Buri, Si Sawat, and Mueang Districts of Kanchanaburi Province, where it merges with the Khwae Noi to form the Mae Klong River at Pak Phraek.

== History ==
This river used to be the upper section (before the confluence with the Khwae Noi River) of the Mae Klong River, however, in the 1960s, this river was named the Khwae Yai River, meaning 'Big River.'

In 1980, the Srinagarind Dam (Thai: เขื่อนศรีนครินทร์; rtgs: Khuean Sinakharin) on the Khwae Yai was completed in Si Sawat District of Kanchanaburi Province. It is an embankment dam for river regulation and hydroelectric power generation.

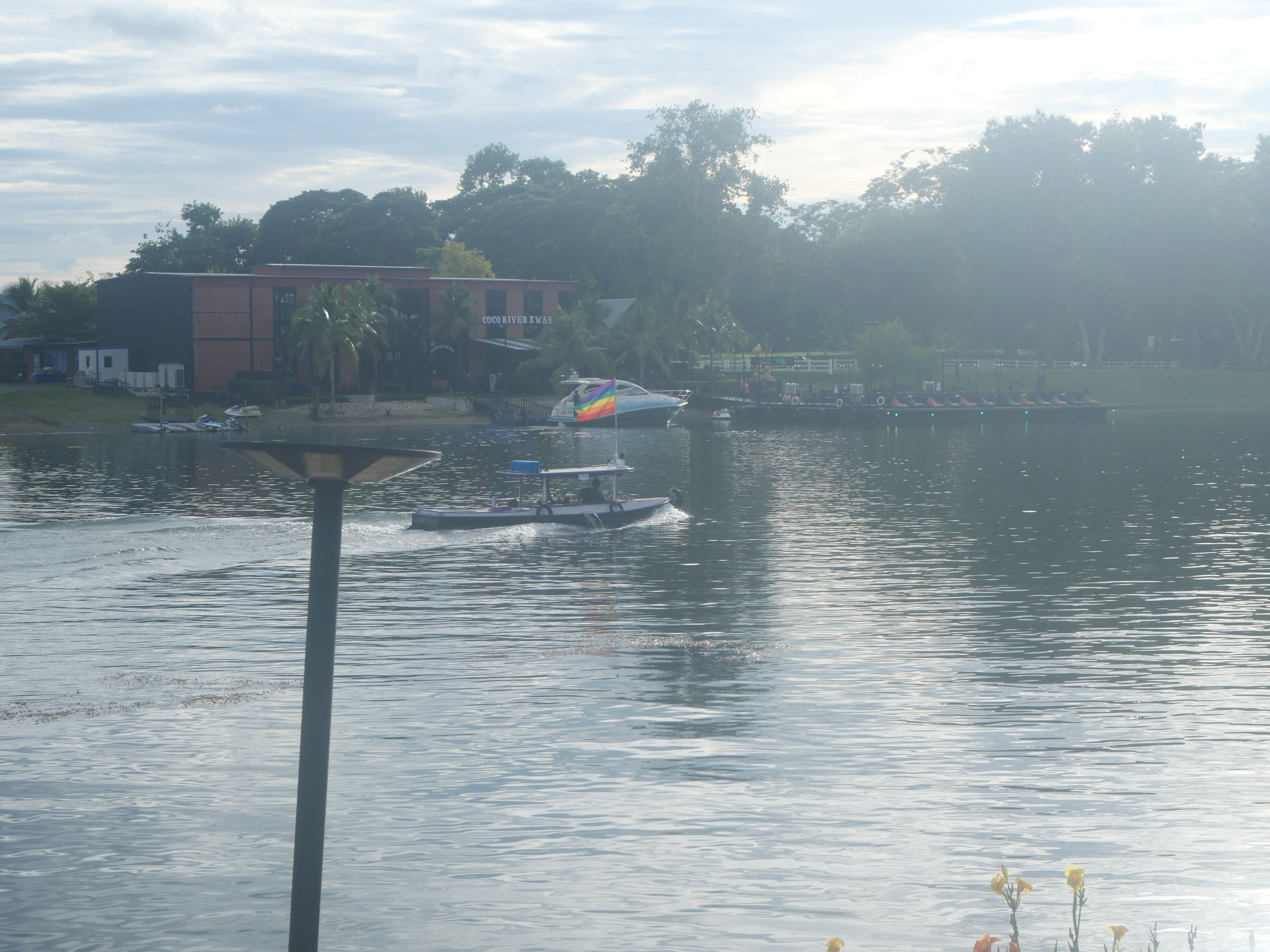
Portion of the Khwae Yai river after the bridge showing a boat heading upstream towards the bridge

== Bridge ==
The famous bridge of the Burma Railway crosses the river at Tha Makham Subdistrict of the Mueang District. However, this is not the same bridge as depicted in The Bridge over the River Kwai by Pierre Boulle and in its film adaptation. A bridge was built of wood approximately 100 metres (330 ft) upriver from the current bridge, during the construction of the iron and concrete bridge (which runs in a NNE-SSW direction) and also rebuilt in 1945 when the iron bridge was bombed. No remnants of the wooden bridge remain. That wooden bridge was also not the bridge depicted in the film as the river was not called the Kwai Yai at that time. A wooden trestle bridge was built over the Kwai Noi many miles upstream in the jungle and it would more closely resemble the bridge in the film. However, the film is really a fictional depiction of the events with many inaccuracies and neither bridge can really be said to be that depicted in the film.

Up until the 1960s, the river was considered part of the Mae Klong itself, but this part of the Mae Klong was then renamed Khwae Yai to bring geographical fact more in line with the fictional association with the name River Kwai. The main cemetery of prisoners who died during the railway's construction is nearby and is called the Kanchanaburi War Cemetery.
