= Mae Klong =

River in western Thailand

Mae Klong River
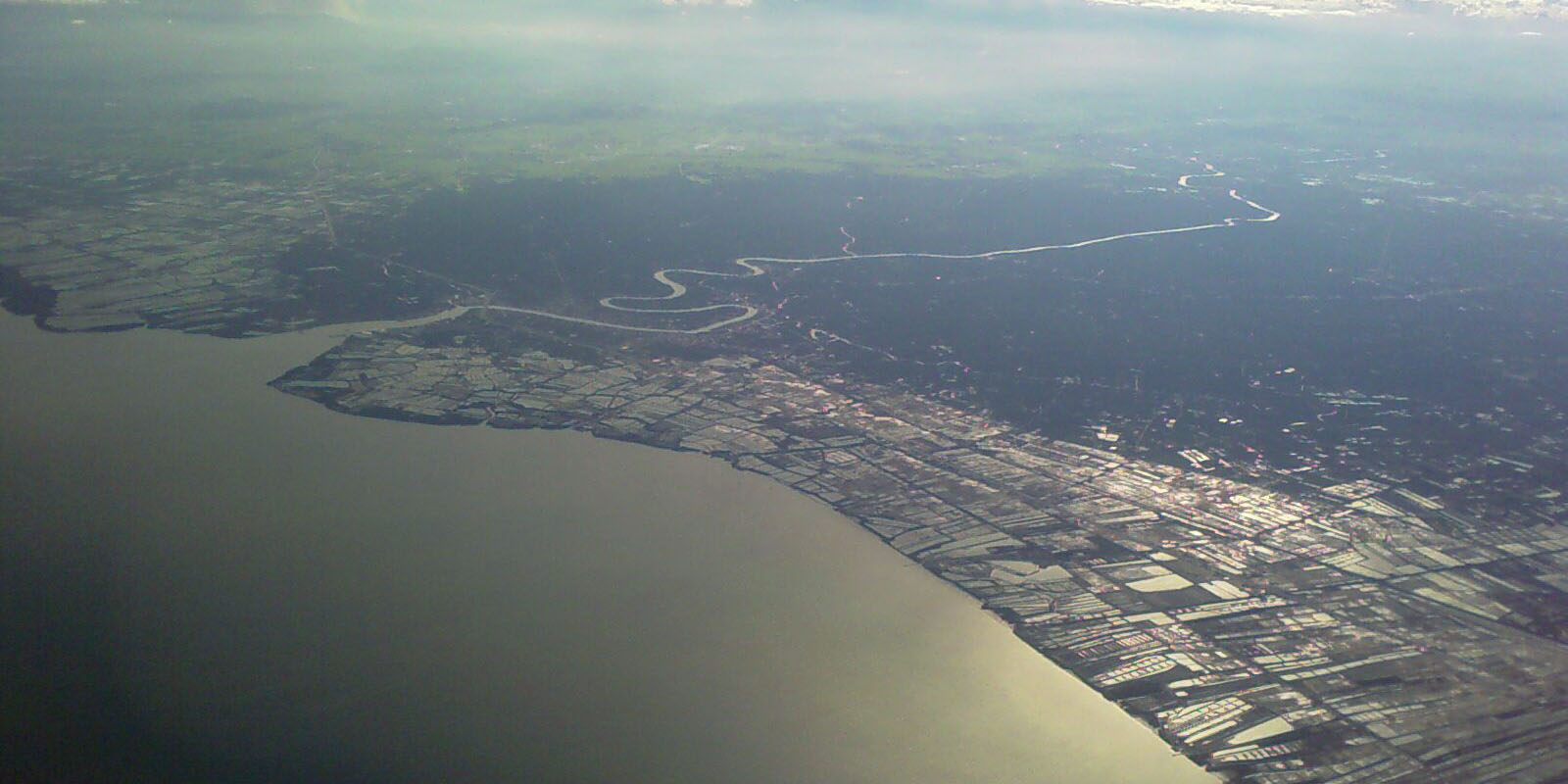
- Mouth of the Mae Klong, Samut Songkhram

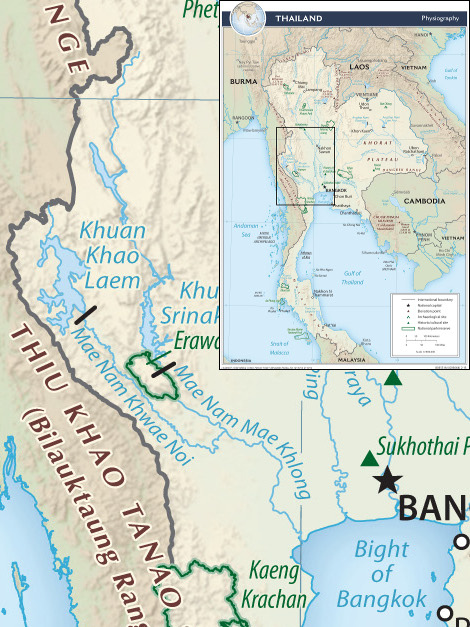

- Mouth location
- Native name: แม่น้ำแม่กลอง (Thai)

Location
- Country: Thailand

Physical characteristics
- Source
  - location: Confluence of Khwae Yai and Khwae Noi rivers
  - coordinates: 14°01′06″N 99°31′40″E
  - elevation: 28 m (92 ft)
- Mouth: Bay of Bangkok
  - location: Samut Songkhram
  - coordinates: 13°21′43″N 100°0′10″E
  - elevation: 0 m (0 ft)
- Length: 132 km (82 mi)
- Discharge
  - location: Samut Songkhram, Samut Songkhram Province

Basin features
- Tributaries
  - left: Khwae Yai River, Khwae Noi River

The Mae Klong (Thai: แม่น้ำแม่กลอง, RTGS: Maenam Mae Klong, Thai pronunciation: [mɛ̂ːnáːm mɛ̂ː klɔ̄ːŋ]), sometimes spelled Meklong, is a river in western Thailand. The river begins in Kanchanaburi Province and flows across Ratchaburi Province and Samut Songkhram Province.

== Course ==
The origin of the river is in Kanchanaburi town, at the confluence of the Khwae Noi River and the Khwae Yai River, having their sources in the eastern side of the Tenasserim Hills. It flows roughly southeastwards and southwards, often forming meanders across a wide floodplain. The river passes by the towns of Ban Pong and Ratchaburi in Ratchaburi Province.

The main reservoir on the river is formed by the Mae Klong Dam.

Finally it ends in a swampy delta by the town of Samut Songkhram and empties into the northwestern shore of the Bay of Bangkok, Gulf of Thailand.

== Environment ==
The Mae Klong river basin has a tropical savanna climate, and is subject to two major thermal systems, the southwest and the northeast monsoons. The southwest monsoon brings moisture up from the Indian Ocean beginning in May and climaxing with heavy rains in September and October. These heavy rains are supplemented by cyclones out of the South China Sea during the same two months. The rising of the winds of the northeast monsoon bring an end to this rainfall. Almost 80% of the annual rainfall in the basin occurs in the half-year from May to October. Total annual rainfall ranges from 1,000 millimetres (39 in) on the coast to 2,400 millimetres (94 in) at the higher elevations. Temperatures in the basin range from lows of 18 °C to highs of 38 °C.

Giant freshwater stingrays inhabit the river. A sudden die-off of forty-five of these rays in September 2016 threatened them with local extinction. Authorities have suspected that pollution was the cause of the die-off. It was later attributed to molasses waste water which leaked from a sugar/ethanol factory in Ban Pong District of Ratchaburi Province on 30 September that continued until 7 October. High levels of free ammonia killed the animals. The Pollution Control Department will sue Rajburi Ethanol Co for allowing molasses wastewater to leak.
