= Charles Jackson =

Charles Jackson may refer to:

== Journalism and writing ==
- Charles James Jackson (1849–1923), British newspaper publisher, specialist on silver and gold
- Sam Jackson (publisher) (Charles Samuel Jackson, 1860–1924), American newspaper publisher
- Charles Kains Jackson (1857–1933), English editor and poet
- C. D. Jackson (Charles Douglas Jackson, 1902–1964), American magazine publisher, adviser to Dwight Eisenhower
- Charles R. Jackson (1903–1968), American novelist, The Lost Weekend
- Charles R. Jackson (USMC) (1898–1970), American Marine who wrote memoir about three years as a POW

== Music ==
- Papa Charlie Jackson (1887–1938), American blues singer
- Rev. Charlie Jackson (1932–2006), American gospel singer on St. George Records
- Chuck Jackson (born 1937), American R&B singer whose hits included "Any Day Now"
- Chuck Jackson (musician) (born 1953), Canadian lead singer of the Downchild Blues Band
- Chuck Jackson (born 1945), lead singer of R&B group The Independents

== Science ==
- Charles Thomas Jackson (1805–1880), American geologist
- Charles Loring Jackson (1847–1935), American chemist
- Charlie Jackson (software) (born 1948), American software entrepreneur

== Sports ==
=== American football ===
- Charlie Jackson (defensive back) (born 1936), American football player
- Charles Jackson (linebacker) (born 1955), American football player
- Charles Jackson (defensive back) (born 1962), American football player
- Charlie Jackson (American football coach) (born 1976), American football coach

=== Baseball ===
- Charles Jackson (baseball) (fl. 1908–1911), American baseball player
- Charlie Jackson (baseball) (1894–1968), MLB outfielder
- Chuck Jackson (baseball) (born 1963), MLB third baseman for the Texas Rangers and Houston Astros

=== Other sports ===
- Charles Jackson (basketball) (born 1993), American basketball player

== Other ==
- Charles Jackson (bishop) (died 1790), Anglican bishop in Ireland
- Charles Jackson (judge) (1775–1855), American judge
- Charles Jackson (Rhode Island politician) (1797–1876), American governor of Rhode Island
- Charles Jackson (antiquary) (1809–1882), English banker
- Charles Jackson (serial killer) (1937–2002), American serial killer
- Charles H. Jackson Jr., American rancher, investor and polo player
- Charles Jackson (1792 ship), a merchantman purchased by the Royal Navy in 1797 and commissioned as HMS Tartarus
