= List of prisoners of war =

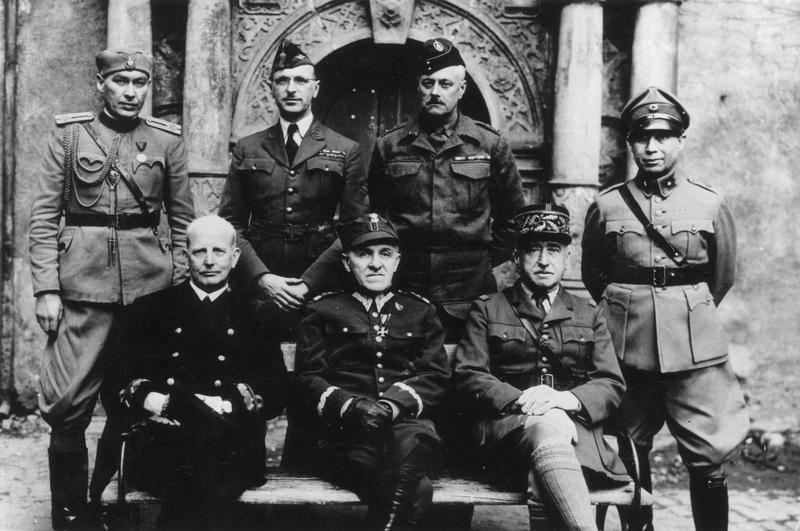
Senior officers held captive in Oflag IV-C in Colditz Castle, including Admiral Józef Unrug and General Tadeusz Piskor.

Winston Churchill in Durban after escaping from captivity in 1899. He had written the Boer Secretary of War a polite departure note, "I have the honour to inform you that as I do not consider that your Government has any right to detain me as a military prisoner, I have decided to escape from your custody..."

This is a list of famous prisoners of war (POWs) whose imprisonment attracted media attention, or who became well known afterwards.

== A ==
- Ron Arad – Israeli fighter pilot, shot down over Lebanon in 1986; not seen since 1988 and is presumed dead
- Everett Alvarez, Jr. – Navy aviator, Vietnam War POW, held for 8 years, second longest period as a POW in American history (after Floyd James Thompson)
- Edan Alexander – American-Israeli soldier taken hostage during the October 7 attacks

== B ==
- Douglas Bader – British fighter pilot, Wing commander in Battle of Britain
- Per Bergsland – Norwegian pilot of No. 332 Squadron RAF. Escapee #44 of the "Great Escape" from Stalag Luft III, successfully made it to Sweden with Jens Müller
- Leonard Birchall – the "Saviour of Ceylon"
- Gregory "Pappy" Boyington – US Marine Corps Fighter Ace during WWII, Medal of Honor recipient
- Fernand Braudel – historian, was a POW in WWII
- Frank Buckles – the last surviving American veteran of WWI, was a civilian during WWII when imprisoned by the Japanese
- Roger Bushell – South African-born RAF Squadron Leader. Masterminded the "Great Escape" from Stalag Luft III in 1944, but was one of the 50 escapees to be recaptured and subsequently murdered by the Gestapo
- Peter Butterworth – actor, Fleet Air Arm officer, shot down 1940, imprisoned in Stalag Luft III
- Hubert Brooks – Canadian RCAF officer, partisan in Home Army in occupied Poland, awarded Military Cross and the Polish Cross of Merit with Swords

== C ==
- Juan Crisóstomo Centurión - Paraguayan Army officer, POW at the end of the Paraguayan War
- Anthony Chenevix-Trench – future headmaster of Eton, artillery officer, prisoner 1942-45 at Changi Prison and on the Burma Railway
- Winston Churchill – during the Second Boer War; escaped
- James Clavell – prisoner in Singapore, based his novel King Rat on his experiences during WWII
- George Thomas Coker – US Navy aviator, POW in North Vietnam, noted resistor of his captors

== D ==
- Rupert Davies – actor, Fleet Air Arm observer, POW in Stalag Luft III 1940-45
- Charles de Gaulle – French general and political leader, captured at Verdun, POW 1916-1918
- Dieter Dengler – United States Navy pilot who escaped a Pathet Lao prison camp in Laos
- Jeremiah Denton – awarded the Navy Cross for resistance in captivity during the Vietnam War
- Roy Dotrice – British actor
- John A. Dramesi – USAF Colonel, Vietnam POW, lead the only organized escape from the Hanoi Hilton with Edwin Atterberry
- Werner Drechsler – killed by fellow German POWs during WWII for informing on other prisoners
- Sir Edward "Weary" Dunlop – Australian surgeon and legend among prisoners of the Thai Burma Railway in WWII
- Clive Dunn – British Dad's Army actor, captured following the Battle of Greece in 1941 and held in German captivity until the end of WWII
- Yakov Dzhugashvili – Joseph Stalin's first son, captured by Germans early in WWII, lived in Sachsenhausen concentration camp in 1943

== E ==
- Denholm Elliott – British actor

== G ==
- Henri Giraud – French general, escaped German captivity in both WWI and WWII
- Ernest Gordon – POW of Japanese in WWII, author of Through the Valley of the Kwai and former Presbyterian Dean of Princeton University chapel

== H ==
- James Hargest – New Zealand Brigadier captured in WWII, escaped from captivity into Switzerland
- Heinrich Harrer – Austrian mountaineer, sportsman and author, detained in British India during WWII until he escaped in 1944, described in his Seven Years in Tibet
- Erich Hartmann – "The Blond Knight of Germany", number one air ace of all air forces in WWII
- Jack Hawkins (U.S. Marine Corps officer)
- Rudolf Hess – Deputy Führer of Germany, POW in England 1941-45, before his trial for war crimes
- Bob Hoover – American WWII pilot, test pilot and airshow performer; captured in 1944 and escaped from Stalag Luft I
- Brian Horrocks – British WW2 general, WWI POW in Germany and Russia
- Wilm Hosenfeld – Soviet POW in WWII, most remembered for saving the life of Polish pianist and composer Władysław Szpilman
- William Hull – American Brigadier General who surrendered Fort Detroit to the British at the outbreak of the War of 1812

== J ==
- Andrew Jackson – seventh President of the United States, captured in the American Revolutionary War as a thirteen-year-old courier
- Charles R. Jackson – captured in Battle of Corregidor, as described in memoir I Am Alive: A United States Marine's Story of Survival in a WWII Japanese POW Camp
- Harold K. Johnson – US Army Chief of Staff 1964; captured at Bataan (1942–1945)

== K ==
- James Kasler - Vietnam, only three time recipient of the Air Force Cross.
- Bert Kaempfert – German orchestra conductor in WWII at a Danish POW camp
- Emil Kapaun – Roman Catholic priest in US Army, Medal of Honor recipient, Servant of God candidate for sainthood
- George Kenner – German artist interned as a civilian POW in Great Britain and the Isle of Man during WWI, which he documented in 110 paintings and drawings
- Tikka Khan – Pakistani soldier captured by Germany during WWII, Chief of Army Staff of the Pakistani Army
- Wajid Khan – Canadian politician, Pakistan-India War 1971 fighter pilot
- Yahya Khan – German POW during WWII, last president of a united Pakistan
- Maximilian Kolbe – Roman Catholic priest from Poland, interned in Auschwitz, and canonized as a saint
- Tadeusz Bór-Komorowski – Commander of the Polish Home Army in the Warsaw Uprising
- Gustav Krist – adventurer and traveler, Austrian soldier in WWI, captured by Russians and Interned in Russian Turkestan
- Sam Kydd – British actor

== L ==
- George Lascelles, 7th Earl of Harewood – captured in Italy 1944, one of the Prominente (celebrity inmates) at Colditz
- Desmond Llewelyn – actor, most famously as Q in the James Bond film series
- Jessica Lynch – American servicewoman during the Iraq war

== M ==
- Herbert Massey – RAF Air Commodore. Senior British Officer at Stalag Luft III who authorized the "Great Escape"
- Keith Matthew Maupin – captured on April 9, 2004, date of murder unknown, remains found March 30, 2008
- Charles Cardwell McCabe – a POW and chaplain at Libby Prison during the American Civil War
- John McCain – Republican nominee for president in 2008, POW for over five years in Vietnam
- Olivier Messiaen – French composer
- George Millar – journalist, British soldier, SOE agent, writer
- Dusty Miller – executed for his faith during internment under the Japanese in Thailand in 1945
- François Mitterrand – French president, captured during WWII in 1940, escaped 6 times before arriving home in December 1941
- Jens Müller – Norwegian pilot of No. 331 Squadron RAF. Escapee #43 of the "Great Escape" from Stalag Luft III, successfully made it to Sweden with Per Bergsland
- Ethel Rogers Mulvany – Canadian POW during WWII, later gained national media attention for her fundraising efforts for former prisoners of war
- W. H. Murray – German POW during WWII, Scottish mountaineer

== N ==
- Airey Neave – British politician, made the first British home run from Colditz on 5 January 1942
- A. A. K. Niazi – commander of Pakistan Army in East Pakistan who surrendered along with nearly 93,000 other soldiers

== O ==
- Richard O'Connor – British General who commanded the Western Desert Force 1940-41
- Domingo Antonio Ortiz - Paraguayan Supreme Court justice and Navy officer, captured during the Paraguayan War

== P ==
- Friedrich Paulus – German field marshal, surrendered Stalingrad to the Soviets in 1943
- Pete Peterson – American diplomat and member of Congress, Air Force pilot who spent more than six years as a POW in Vietnam
- Donald Pleasence – English film and stage actor, WWII RAF airman shot down and placed in a German POW camp; later acted in the film The Great Escape

== R ==
- John Rarick – U.S. Representative from Louisiana
- Sławomir Rawicz – Polish Army lieutenant who was imprisoned by the Soviets after the German-Soviet invasion of Poland. Ghost-wrote the book "The Long Walk", where he claimed he and six others escaped from a Siberian Gulag camp and trekked on foot through the Gobi Desert, Tibet, and the Himalayas before finally reaching British India
- Pat Reid – author of historical non-fiction
- James Robinson Risner – USAF Brigadier General, first living recipient of the Air Force Cross
- Yevgeny Rodionov – Russian soldier captured by rebel forces in Chechnya and beheaded for refusing to convert to Islam
- Giles Romilly – nephew of Winston Churchill, war correspondent, Prominente (celebrity prisoner) in Germany 1940-45
- James N. Rowe – Colonel, US Army Special Forces, held by the Viet Cong from 1963 to 1968, one of only 34 American soldiers to escape captivity in Vietnam

== S ==
- Jean-Paul Sartre – French philosopher and writer, POW 1940-1941
- Kazuo Sakamaki – first POW captured by US forces in WWII
- Winfield Scott – American Lt Col who surrendered at the Battle of Queenston Heights; later Commanding General of the United States Army from 1841 to 1861
- Ronald Searle – English cartoonist
- Léopold Senghor – Senegalize writer and political leader, captured 1940 in France
- Gilad Shalit – Israeli soldier captured in 2006 by Hamas, released in a prisoner exchange in 2011
- Vladek Spiegelman – Polish private captured by Germany on first day of WWII, father of Art Spiegelman
- William Stacy – Lieutenant Colonel of the Continental Army, captured during the Cherry Valley massacre; General George Washington made failed attempt to retrieve him via prisoner exchange
- James Stockdale – candidate for Vice President in 1992; decorated member of the US Navy; POW in Vietnam Medal of Honor recipient.
- E W Swanton – captured by Japanese in Singapore; after war, was BBC sports commentator

== T ==
- Floyd James Thompson – America's longest-held POW, he spent 9 years in POW camps in Vietnam (1964 – 1973)
- Josip Broz Tito – president of Yugoslavia, Austrian soldier in WWI, captured by Russians in 1915
- András Toma – last known WWII POW, a Hungarian soldier who lived in a psychiatric asylum in Russia for 55 years before being identified and returned home in 2000
- Jakow Trachtenberg – Russian Jewish mathematician who developed the mental calculation techniques called the Trachtenberg system
- Mikhail Tukhachevsky – Soviet military leader and theorist, captured by Germans in WWI

== U ==
- Charles Upham – most decorated Commonwealth soldier of WWII, awarded the Victoria Cross twice

== V ==
- Arthur W. Vanaman – Major General, Chief-of-Staff for Intelligence for the Eighth Air Force. Highest-ranked American POW in the European Theater during WWII
- Laurens van der Post – South African writer and war hero, captured by Japanese forces in 1942
- Bram van der Stok – Dutch pilot of No. 41 Squadron RAF. Escapee #18 of the "Great Escape" from Stalag Luft III, successfully crossed Europe with help from the French Resistance to reach a British consulate in Spain
- Abhinandan Varthaman – Indian Air Force pilot, shot down and captured during Indo - Pak standoff in Feb 2019
- Dietrich von Choltitz – German general, military governor of Paris, POW in England 1944-45, then in American custody till 1947
- Walther von Seydlitz-Kurzbach – German general captured at Stalingrad
- Kurt Vonnegut – American writer; captured in the Battle of the Bulge and witnessed the bombing of Dresden

== W ==
- Jonathan Wainwright – Commanding General US forces in Philippines; captured at Bataan (1942–1945)
- Mary Edwards Walker – first female doctor in the US Army, prisoner of war in the American Civil War. She is the only woman to receive the Medal of Honor.
- George Washington – first US President, captured in 1754 by the French during the French and Indian War
- Peter Wyngarde – British actor, imprisoned as a young British citizen in Langhua POW camp in WWII

== Z ==
- Louis Zamperini – American athlete, member of Olympic team, captured by Japanese forces in 1943
