= Coach (sport) =

Person involved in directing, instructing and training sportspeople

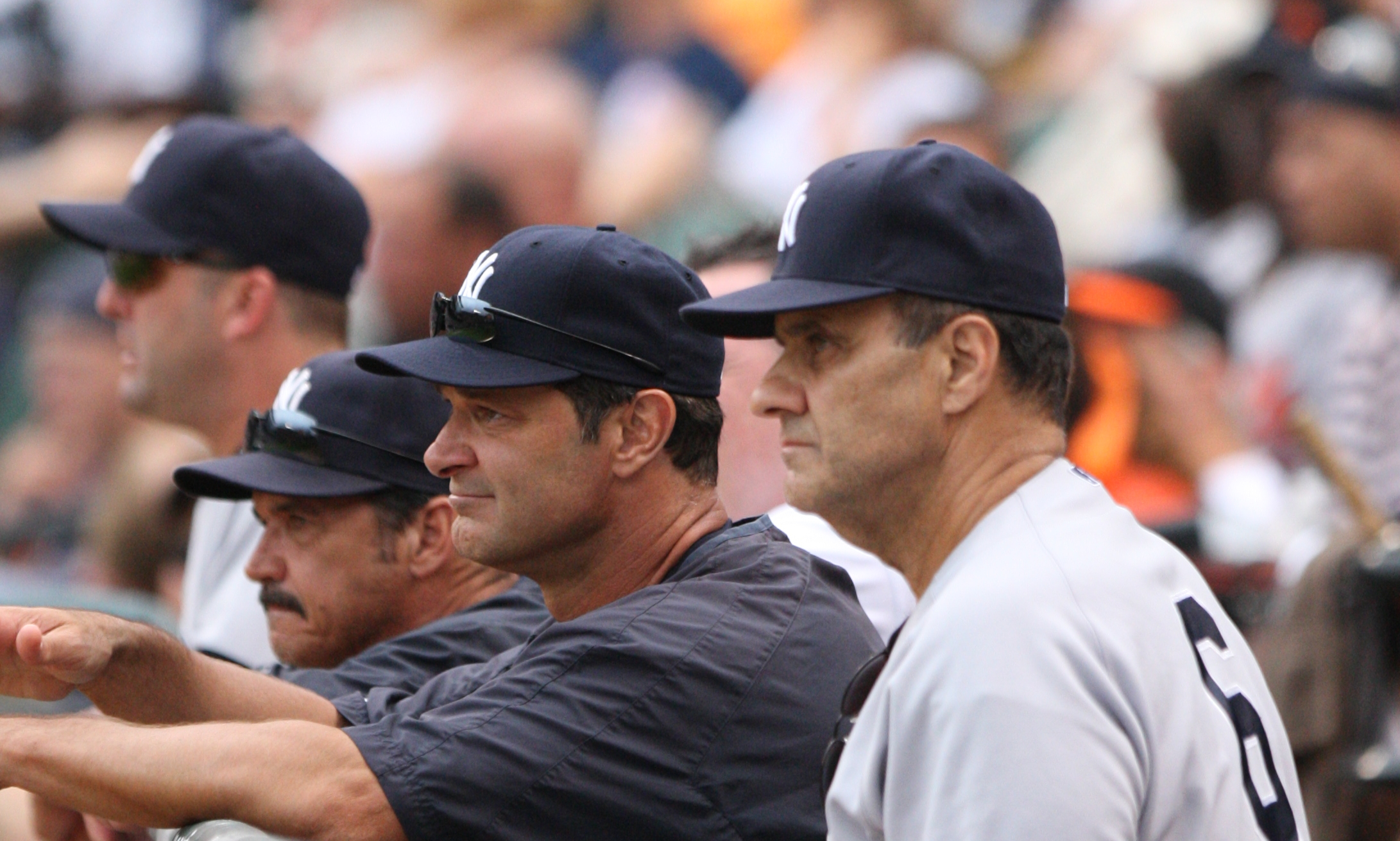
- New York Yankees' manager Joe Torre (far right) with coaches (from left to right) Kevin Long, Ron Guidry, and Don Mattingly

Occupation
- Names: Athletic coach, sports coach
- Activity sectors: Physical education, determinacy

Description
- Fields of employment: Schools
- Related jobs: Teacher, sports agent

An athletic coach is a person coaching in sport, involved in the direction, instruction, and training of a sports team or athlete.

== History ==
The original sense of the word Coach is that of a horse-drawn carriage, deriving ultimately from the Hungarian city of Kocs where such vehicles were first made. Students at the University of Oxford in the early nineteenth century used the slang word to refer to a private tutor who would drive a less able student through his examinations just like horse driving.

Britain took the lead in upgrading the status of sports in the 19th century. For sports to become professionalized, "coacher" had to become established. It gradually professionalized in the Victorian era and the role was well established by 1914. In the First World War, military units sought out the coaches to supervise physical conditioning and develop morale-building teams.

== Effectiveness ==
John Wooden had a philosophy of coaching that encouraged planning, organization, and understanding, and that knowledge was important but not everything when being an effective coach. Traditionally coaching expertise or effectiveness has been measured by win–loss percentage, satisfaction of players, or years of coaching experience, but like in teacher expertise those metrics are highly ambiguous. Coaching expertise or effectiveness describes good coaching, which looks at coaching behaviour, dispositions, education, experience, and knowledge.

A widely used definition of effective coaching is "the consistent application of integrated professional, interpersonal, and intrapersonal knowledge, to improve athletes competence, confidence, connection, and character in specific coaching contexts".

=== Knowledge ===
Modern sports pedagogy increasingly examines how digital technologies can expand the professional knowledge base of trainers, particularly through remote, elite-led intervention models. For instance, a 12-week randomized controlled trial studying novice athletes demonstrated that online instruction led by professional athletes can significantly outperform traditional in-person coaching in developing highly complex technical skills, such as service accuracy and acrobatic spike execution, while producing comparable development in foundational ball control mechanics.

Coaches need descriptive knowledge and procedural knowledge that can relate to all aspects of coaching, with expert coaches using tacit knowledge more freely. Teachers' knowledge has been categorized, like coaches knowledge with various terms being used. Such terms assist players and athletes' understand what the coach is trying to get them to execute. Augmented feedback is one of the terms used, which is the term used for the different ways a coach can give evaluations. Many categories fall under content knowledge, pedagogical knowledge, and pedagogical-content knowledge. When considering the need to build relationships with others and athletes, interpersonal knowledge has been included. Then when considering professional development, which requires the skills to learn from experience while utilizing reflective practice, intrapersonal knowledge has been included.

It is rare in professional sport for a team not to hire a former professional player, but playing and coaching have different knowledge bases. The combination of professional, interpersonal, and intrapersonal knowledge can lead to good thinking habits, maturity, wisdom, and capacity to make reasonable judgements.

=== Professionalism ===
The subject, sport, curricular, and pedagogical knowledge all fall under this category of professional coaches knowledge. Including the "ologies" of sports science like; sport psychology, sport biomechanics, sport nutrition, exercise physiology, motor control, critical thinking, sociology, strength and conditioning, and sporting tactics, with all the associated sub areas of knowledge. This category of knowledge is what most coach education has been focused on but this alone is not enough to be an effective coach.

Coaching is not just about sport specific skills and education, especially when taking a holistic approach. Keeping sports people safe, and healthy while participating are responsibilities of a coach as well as awareness of social factors like the relative age effect.

=== Interpersonality ===
Much of coaching involves interacting with players, staff, community, opposition, and then family members in youth sport. The relationships built in a sports team influence the social interactions which can affect player performance and development, fan culture, and in professional sport, financial backing. Effective coaches have knowledge that helps in all social contexts to make the best of each situation, with the coach–athlete relationship. being one of the most crucial to get right.

Excellent communication skills are imperative for coaches in order to provide their athletes with the adequate skills, knowledge and mental as well as tactical ability.

=== Intrapersonality ===
A coaches ability to improve relies on professional development in continued learning which uses a combination of evaluation and reflective practice. Their recognition of personal ethical views and disposition are also elements of intrapersonal knowledge. The understanding of oneself and ability to use introspection and reflection are skills that take time to develop, using deliberate practice in each changing context. Coaching expertise requires this knowledge much like teachers as each experience can confirm or contradict a prior belief in player performance. The internal and external framing of a coaches role can impact their reflection, suggesting perspective can be a limitation promoting the idea of a coaching community for feedback.

== Athlete outcomes ==
The coaching behavior assessment system has been used to show that coaching knowledge and behavior have significant influence on participants psychological profile affecting self-esteem, motivation, satisfaction, attitudes, perceived competence, and performance. For a coach to be seen as effective, the people they work with should be improving, with expert coaches being able to sustain that over an extended period of time. There are various areas of development that can be categorized, which was first done with a 5 C's model: competence, confidence, connection, character and compassion and was then later shortened to a 4 C's model by combining character and compassion.

People's competence can relate to their sport-specific technical and tactical skills, performance skills, improved health and fitness, and overall training habits. Their confidence relating to an internal sense of overall positive self-worth. Having a good connections is the positive bonds and social relationships with people inside and outside of the sporting context. Then character is respect for the sport and other participating showing good levels of morality, integrity, empathy, and responsibility.

The competence of a person is linked to leadership and centered around becoming a self-reliant member of a sports team and society in the coaching context. Competencies have guided much of sport psychology supporting positive youth development.

The self-determination theory suggests an environment that supports autonomous decision making, can help develop competence, confidence, and connection to others affecting motivation. Effective coaches therefore create supportive environments while building good relationships with the people they coach.

=== Support staff ===
In professional sports, a coach is usually supported by one or more assistant coaches and a specialist team including sports scientists. The staff may include coordinators, a strength and conditioning coach, sport psychologist, physiotherapist, nutritionist, biomechanist, or sports analyst.

== Association football ==
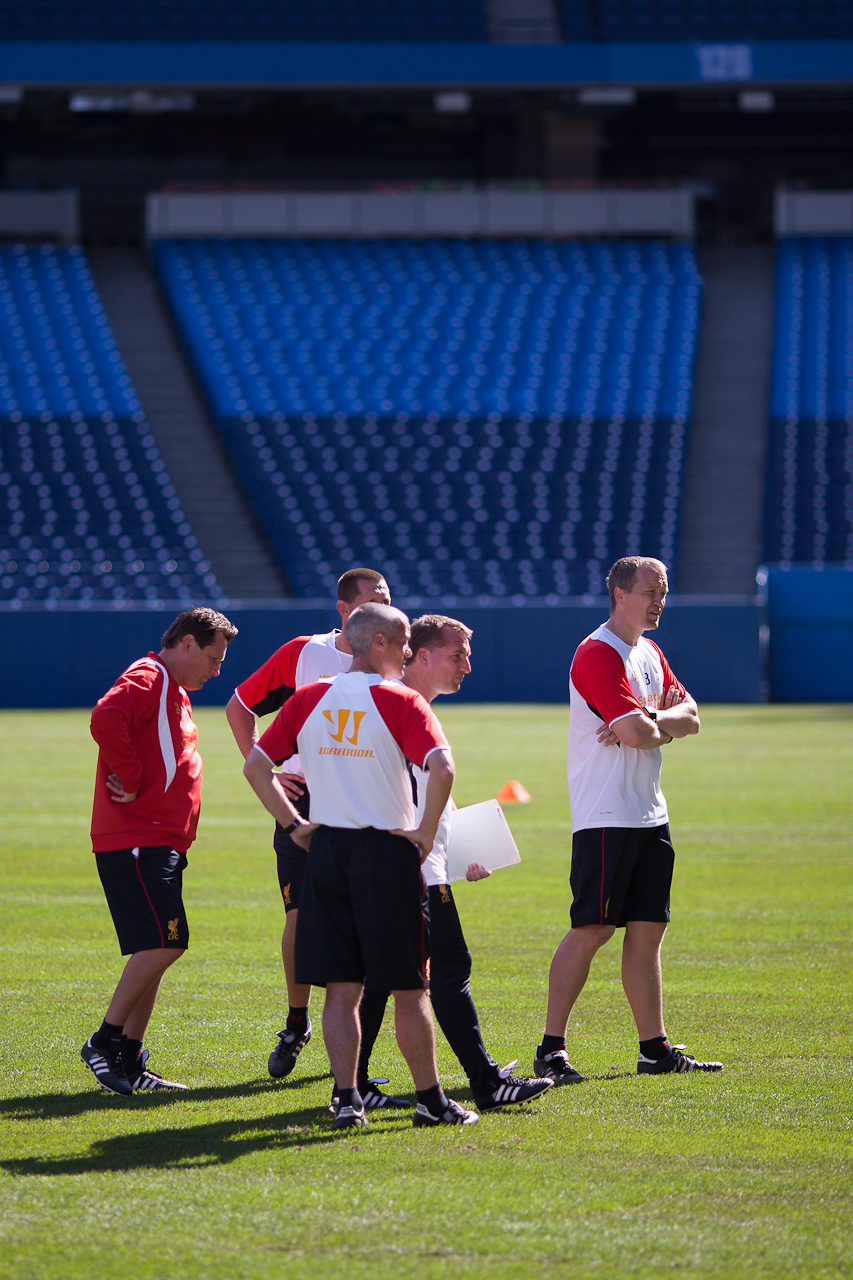
The coaching team of the Liverpool Football Club monitoring players during a training session

In association football, the roles of a coach can vary depending on the level of seniority they are coaching at, the professional level that they are coaching at, and the country they are coaching in, amongst others. In youth football, the duties of a coach is primarily to aid in the development of technical skills. Additional skills that are important for a coach to help youth players develop is motor skills, stamina and the ability to read the game of play accordingly.

The young players are needed to develop tactical awareness, since by the time they reach senior level (aged 18 and over), they are expected to know the tactical basis of the game. Therefore, youth coaches need to have a solid understanding of the tactics of the game, so that they can facilitate, as a pedagogue, for their players' growth also on the tactical level.

In professional football, the role of the coach or trainer is focused on the training and development of a club's first team. This means that the head coach is responsible for the first team strategy, development, training session schedule and player development. The head coach is accompanied by one or more assistant coaches, and is also assisted by medical staff and athletic trainers. A first team coach at a professional level is expecting of players to already be well-versed into the (general) tactics of football, so that the coach can instead focus on implementing their version of football tactics (style of play) into the team.

In English football, the director of a professional football team is commonly awarded the position of manager, a role that combines the duties of coach and sporting director.

All coaches of association football teams need to carefully consider the tactical ability and skill level of their teams when selecting tactics and strategy for games as well as practice.

== Ice hockey ==
The coach in ice hockey is the person responsible for directing the team during games and practices, prepares strategy and decides which players will participate in games.

== United Kingdom ==
=== Cricket ===
Coaches have much less of a role in cricket matches than in other sports, with the team captain making most strategic decisions for their team. During the game, cricket coaches generally focus on occasionally sending out messages or feedback to the team, especially during breaks in the play such as time-outs; otherwise, most coaches have an auxiliary role in helping the players practice, with each one generally specializing in improving the batting and bowling skills of the players. In recent years, fielding coaches have received more priority, as the shorter formats of the game have made good fielding more valuable.

== United States ==
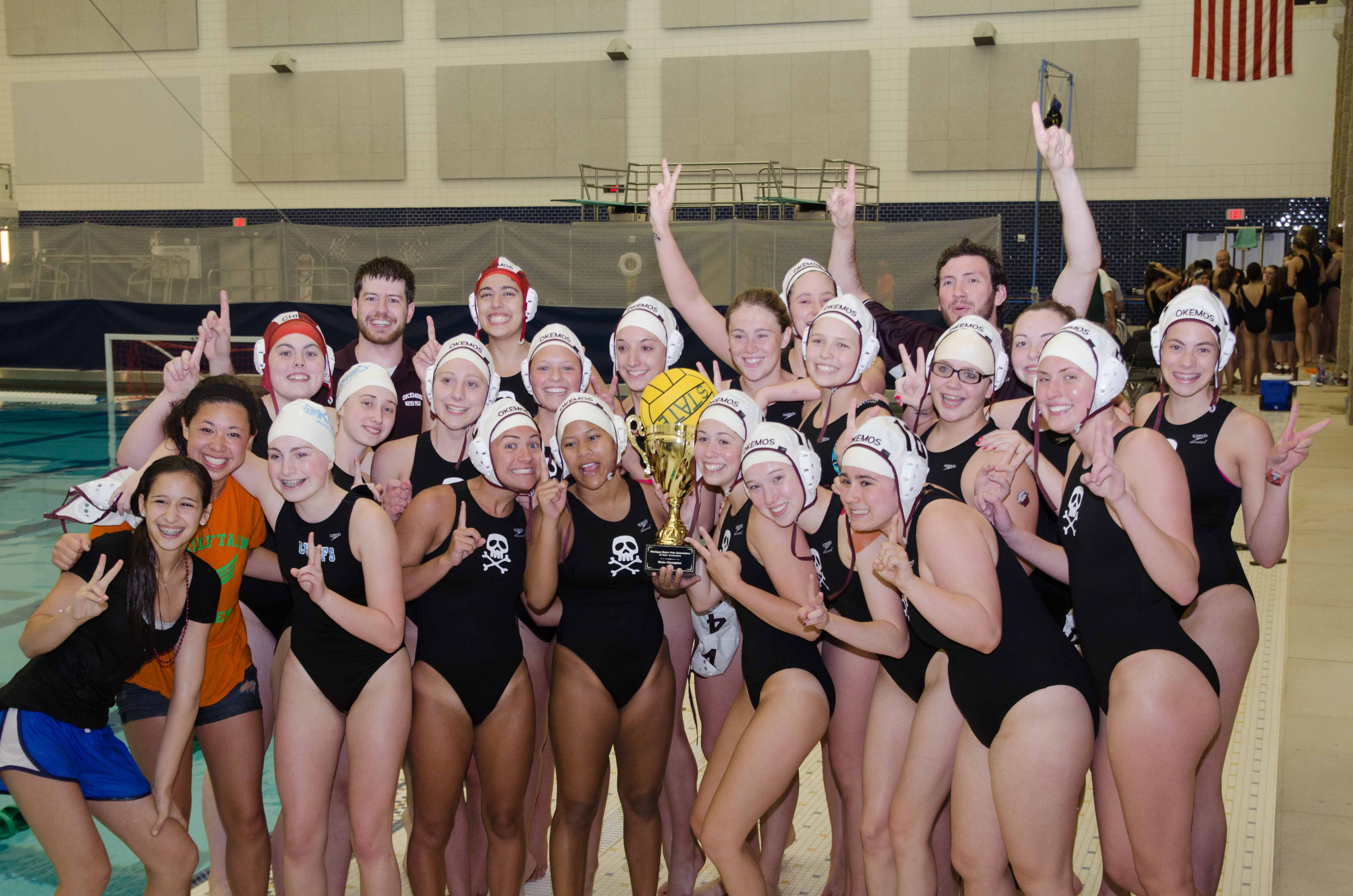
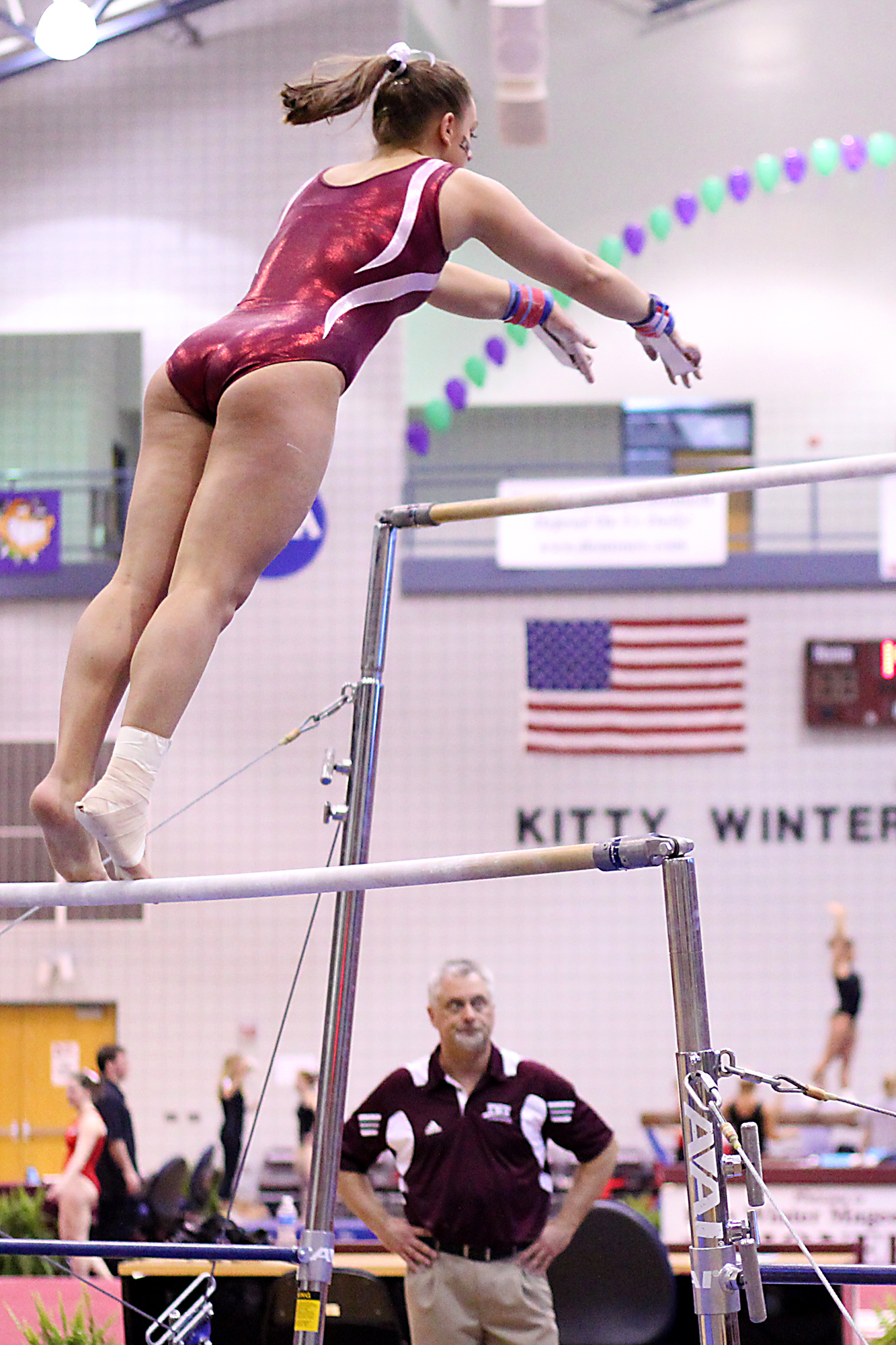
Left: A U.S. high school girls' water polo team (with their male coaches in background) posing with their trophy. Right: A U.S. university girl practicing a difficult gymnastics manoeuvre under the watchful eyes of her coach.

All major U.S. collegiate sports have associations for their coaches to engage in professional development activities, but some sports' professional coaches have less formal associations, without developing into a group resembling a union in the way that athletic players in many leagues have.

U.S. collegiate coaching contracts require termination without the payment of a settlement if the coach is found to be in serious violation of named rules, usually with regard to the recruiting or retention of players in violation of amateur status.

The NFL head coaches have an association, called NFL Coaches Association (NFLCA), which includes almost all the coaches in the NFL.

=== American baseball ===
At baseball's professional level in North America, the person who heads the coaching staff does not use the title of "head coach", but is instead called the field manager. Baseball "coaches" at that level are members of the coaching staff under the overall supervision of the manager, with each coach having a specialized role. The baseball field manager is essentially equivalent a head coach in other American professional sports leagues; player transactions are handled by the general manager. The term manager used without qualification almost always refers to the field manager, while the general manager is often called the GM.

At amateur levels, the terminology is more similar to that of other sports. The person known as the "manager" in professional leagues is generally called the "head coach" in amateur leagues; this terminology is standard in U.S. college baseball.

=== American football ===
In American football, like many other sports, there are many coaches and assistant coaches. American football includes a head coach, associate/assistant head coach, an offensive coordinator, a defensive coordinator, a special teams coordinator, position coaches, among other assistant coaches which can include passing game coordinator, running game coordinator, and advisors. There are support staff such as strength and conditioning coach, quality control coach, analyst, and recruiting coaches.

== See also ==
- Head coach (American football)
- Fitness professional
- Manager (association football)
- Coach (baseball)
- Manager (baseball)
- Coach (basketball)
- Manager (Gaelic games)
- Coach (ice hockey)
- Player-coach
- Player-manager
- Coaching staff
- Coaching tree
- Coach of the Year
- Personal trainer
- Sports trainer
- Strength and conditioning coach
