= The Bridge on the River Kwai =

1957 film directed by David Lean

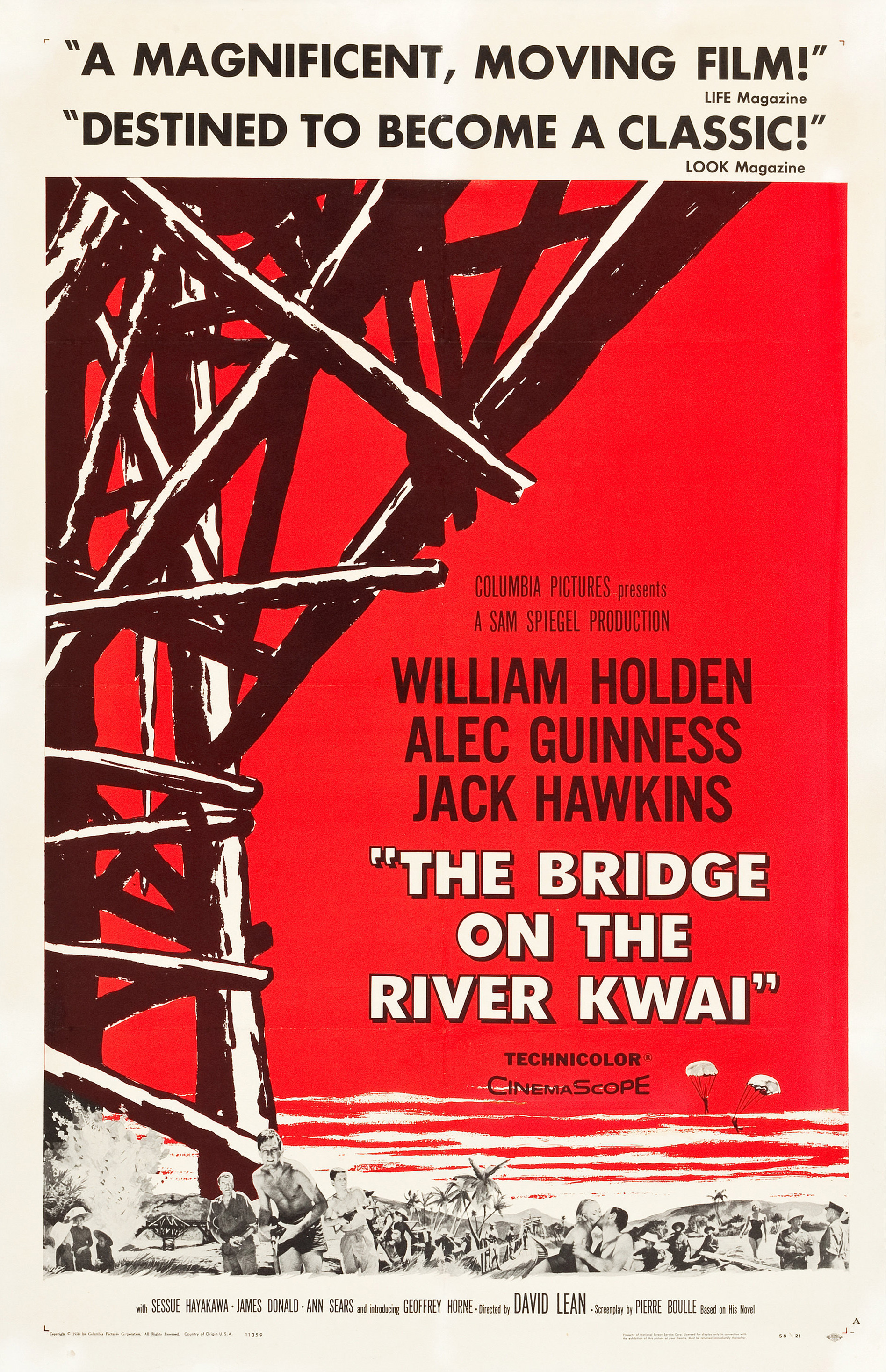
- American theatrical release poster, "Style A"
- Directed by: David Lean
- Screenplay by: Carl Foreman; Michael Wilson
- Based on: The Bridge over the River Kwai; 1952 novel by Pierre Boulle
- Produced by: Sam Spiegel
- Starring: William Holden; Alec Guinness; Jack Hawkins; Sessue Hayakawa; James Donald; Ann Sears; Geoffrey Horne
- Cinematography: Jack Hildyard
- Edited by: Peter Taylor
- Music by: Malcolm Arnold
- Production companies: Columbia Pictures; Horizon Pictures
- Distributed by: Columbia Pictures
- Release dates: 2 October 1957 (London-premiere); 11 October 1957 (United Kingdom); 14 December 1957 (United States)
- Running time: 161 minutes
- Countries: United Kingdom; United States
- Languages: English; Japanese
- Budget: $2.8 million or $2.4 million
- Box office: $30.6 million(equivalent to $342 million in 2024)

The film's trailer

The Bridge on the River Kwai is a 1957 war film directed by David Lean and based on the novel The Bridge over the River Kwai, written by Pierre Boulle. Boulle's novel and the film's screenplay are fictional; they use the construction of the Burma Railway in 1942–1943 as historical setting. It stars William Holden, Alec Guinness, and Jack Hawkins, with Sessue Hayakawa, James Donald, Ann Sears, and Geoffrey Horne in supporting roles.

The film was initially scripted by screenwriter Carl Foreman, who was replaced by Michael Wilson. Both writers had to work in secret since they were on the Hollywood blacklist and had fled to the UK to continue working. As a result, Boulle, who did not speak English, was credited and received the Academy Award for Best Adapted Screenplay; many years later, Foreman and Wilson posthumously received the Academy Award.

The Bridge on the River Kwai is considered as one of the greatest films of the 1950s. It was the highest-grossing film of 1957 and received positive reviews from critics. The film won seven Academy Awards (including Best Picture) at the 30th Academy Awards. In 1997, the film was deemed "culturally, historically, or aesthetically significant" and selected for preservation in the National Film Registry by the United States Library of Congress. It has been included on the American Film Institute's list of best American films ever made. In 1999, the British Film Institute voted The Bridge on the River Kwai the 11th greatest British film of the 20th century.

== Plot ==
In February 1943, a contingent of British prisoners of war, led by Lt. Colonel Nicholson, arrive at a Japanese prison camp in Thailand. United States Navy Commander Shears describes the horrific conditions to Nicholson, who forbids any escape attempts because they had been ordered to surrender by their own headquarters.

Colonel Saito, the camp commandant, informs the prisoners the camp needs no fences because the surrounding jungle makes escape impossible, and that they will be used as labor to construct a bridge over the River Kwai for the railway connecting Thailand and Burma.

Nicholson objects, citing the Geneva Convention exempting officers from manual labor. Saito threatens to have the officers shot, but Major Clipton, the British medical officer, warns him there are too many witnesses. The officers are left standing in the intense heat until evening when Saito confines them to a punishment hut. Nicholson is beaten and locked in a metal box. Shears becomes the only survivor of an escape attempt and recuperates in British Ceylon after being tended to by Thai civilians.

British sabotage and deliberately slow work impedes bridge construction, made worse by incompetent Japanese engineering. When Nicholson is released from confinement, he is shocked by the poor job his men have done and orders the construction of a proper bridge that he feels will be a lasting tribute to the British Army's superiority. Clipton unsuccessfully argues that would be collaboration with the enemy. Even though Saito had given in to his principled stand and excused the British officers from manual labor, Nicholson volunteers them to join in the physical work.

Shears' comfortable life in Ceylon is shaken up when Major Warden tries to recruit him for a commando mission to destroy the bridge. Shears reveals he impersonated an officer to get better treatment in the camp, but Warden already knew of his deception and arranged his attachment to the British military, forcing him to participate. Warden, Shears, Chapman and Joyce parachute into Thailand. Chapman dies on landing, and Warden is wounded in an encounter with a Japanese patrol. Khun Yai, a village chief, and a group of Thai women guide the trio to the river. Under cover of darkness, Shears, Yai and Joyce plant explosives at the base of the bridge towers and plan to destroy it as the first train crosses, scheduled for the next morning.

Sunrise reveals the river level has dropped, exposing the wire leading to the detonator. Nicholson spots the wire, and he and Saito investigate as the train approaches. Nicholson pulls up the wire on the riverbank, leading them toward Joyce, who is manning the detonator. Joyce breaks cover and stabs Saito to death. Nicholson calls for help and attempts to stop Joyce from reaching the detonator. After Joyce is shot, Yai is shot dead while offering covering fire as Shears swims across the river to try to detonate the explosives but he too is fatally wounded. Recognizing Shears, Nicholson exclaims, "What have I done?" Warden fires a mortar, wounding Nicholson. Dazed, Nicholson stumbles towards the detonator and falls on the plunger, blowing up the bridge; the train tumbles into the river. Warden, turning toward the group's horrified guides, pleads, "I had to do it! They might have been taken alive!". Witnessing the carnage, Clipton exclaims, "Madness! ... Madness!"

== Cast ==
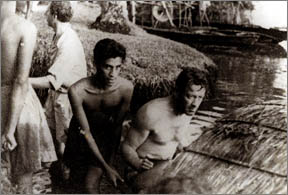
Chandran Rutnam and William Holden while shooting The Bridge on the River Kwai.

- William Holden as "Commander" Shears, U.S. Navy (later Brevet Major, Force 316)
- Alec Guinness as Colonel Nicholson, British commander
- Jack Hawkins as Major Warden, Force 316
- Sessue Hayakawa as Colonel Saito, Japanese commander
- James Donald as Major Clipton, medical officer
- Geoffrey Horne as Lieutenant Joyce
- André Morell as Colonel Green
- Peter Williams as Captain Reeves
- John Boxer as Major Hughes
- Percy Herbert as Grogan
- Harold Goodwin as Baker
- Henry Okawa as Captain Kanematsu
- Keiichiro Katsumoto as Lieutenant Miura
- M.R.B. Chakrabandhu as Yai

== Production ==
=== Screenplay ===
The screenwriters, Carl Foreman and Michael Wilson, were on the Hollywood blacklist and even though living in exile in England could only work on the film in secret. The two did not collaborate on the script; Wilson took over after Lean was dissatisfied with Foreman's work. The official credit was given to Pierre Boulle (who did not speak English), and the resulting Oscar for Best Screenplay (Adaptation) was awarded to him. Only in 1984 did the Academy rectify the situation by retroactively awarding the Oscar to Foreman and Wilson, posthumously in both cases. Subsequent releases of the film gave them proper screen credit. David Lean claimed that producer Sam Spiegel cheated him out of his rightful part in the credits since he had had a major hand in the script.

The film was relatively faithful to the novel, with two major exceptions. Shears, who is a British commando officer like Warden in the novel, becomes an American sailor who escapes from the POW camp. Also, in the novel, the bridge is not destroyed: the train plummets into the river from a secondary charge placed by Warden, but Nicholson (never realizing "what have I done?") does not fall onto the plunger, and the bridge suffers only minor damage. Boulle nonetheless enjoyed the film version, though he disagreed with its climax.

=== Casting ===
Although Lean later denied it, Charles Laughton was his first choice for the role of Nicholson. Laughton was in his habitually overweight state and was either denied insurance coverage or was simply not keen on filming in a tropical location. Cary Grant was offered the role of Nicholson but turned it down in favor of The Pride and the Passion to work with Marlon Brando before he was replaced by Frank Sinatra on that film. Guinness admitted that Lean "didn't particularly want me" for the role, and thought about immediately returning to England when he arrived in Ceylon and Lean reminded him that he was not the first choice.

William Holden's deal—he received 10% of the film's gross receipts—was considered one of the best ever for an actor at the time.

=== Filming ===
The bridge at Kitulgala, Sri Lanka, before the explosion seen in the film.

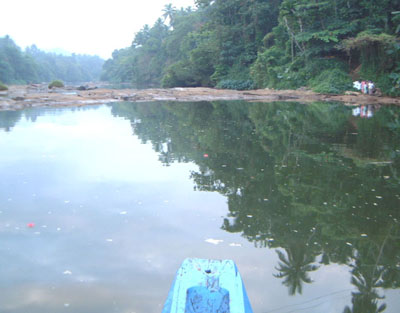
A photo of Kitulgala, Sri Lanka in 2004, where the bridge was made for the film.

Many directors were considered for the project, among them John Ford, William Wyler, Howard Hawks, Fred Zinnemann, and Orson Welles (who was also offered a starring role).

The film was an international co-production between companies in Britain and the United States.

Director David Lean clashed repeatedly with his cast members, particularly Guinness and James Donald, who thought the novel was anti-British. Lean had a lengthy row with Guinness over how to play the role of Nicholson; the actor wanted to play the part with a sense of humor and sympathy, while Lean thought Nicholson should be "a bore." On another occasion, they argued over the scene where Nicholson reflects on his career in the army. Lean filmed the scene from behind Guinness and angrily exploded when Guinness asked him why he was doing this. After Guinness was done with the scene, Lean said, "Now you can all fuck off and go home, you English actors. Thank God that I'm starting work tomorrow with an American actor (William Holden)."

The film was made in Ceylon (now Sri Lanka). The bridge in the film was near Kitulgala. The Mount Lavinia Hotel was used as a location for the hospital.

Guinness said that he subconsciously based his walk while emerging from "the Oven" on that of his eleven-year-old son Matthew, who was recovering from polio at the time, a disease that left him temporarily paralyzed from the waist down. Guinness reflected on the scene, calling it the "finest piece of work" he had ever done.

Lean nearly drowned when he was swept away by the river current during a break from filming.

In a 1988 interview with Barry Norman, Lean confirmed that Columbia almost stopped filming after three weeks because there was no white woman in the film, forcing him to add what he called "a very terrible scene" between Holden and a nurse on the beach.

The filming of the bridge explosion was to be done on 10 March 1957, in the presence of S.W.R.D. Bandaranaike, then Prime Minister of Ceylon, and a team of government dignitaries. However, cameraman Freddy Ford was unable to get out of the way of the explosion in time, and Lean had to stop filming. The train crashed into a generator on the other side of the bridge and was damaged. It was repaired in time to be blown up the next morning, with Bandaranaike and his entourage present.

=== Music and soundtrack ===
The Bridge on the River Kwai (Original Soundtrack Recording)

Soundtrack album by Various
- Released: 1957
- Recorded: 21 October 1957
- Genre: Soundtrack
- Length: 44:49
- Label: Columbia Records
- Producer: Various

Professional ratings
Review scores
Source	Rating
AllMusic	3/5 stars

British composer Malcolm Arnold recalled that he had "ten days to write around forty-five minutes worth of music"—much less time than he was used to. He described the music for The Bridge on the River Kwai as the "worst job I ever had in my life" because of the time constraint. Despite this, he won an Oscar and a Grammy. The film's soundtrack was released on LP after the film (Columbia CL 1100). In 1990, Christopher Palmer arranged a concert suite for large orchestra for Arnold's 70th birthday.

A memorable feature of the film is the tune that is whistled by the POWs—the first strain of the "Colonel Bogey March"—when they enter the camp. Gavin Young recounts meeting Donald Wise, a former prisoner of the Japanese who had worked on the Burma Railway. Young: "Donald, did anyone whistle Colonel Bogey ... as they did in the film?" Wise: "I never heard it in Thailand. We hadn't much breath left for whistling. But in Bangkok I was told that David Lean, the film's director, became mad at the extras who played the prisoners—us—because they couldn't march in time. Lean shouted at them, 'For God's sake, whistle a march to keep time to.' And a bloke called George Siegatz... —an expert whistler—began to whistle Colonel Bogey, and a hit was born."

The march was written in 1914 by Kenneth J. Alford, a pseudonym of British Bandmaster Frederick J. Ricketts. For the film, Arnold wrote an accompanying counter-melody to the Colonel Bogey strain using the same chord progressions, then continued with his own "The River Kwai March", played by the off-screen orchestra taking over from the whistlers, though Arnold's march was not heard in completion on the soundtrack (apparently for copyright reasons). Mitch Miller had a hit with a recording of both marches.

== Historical accuracy ==
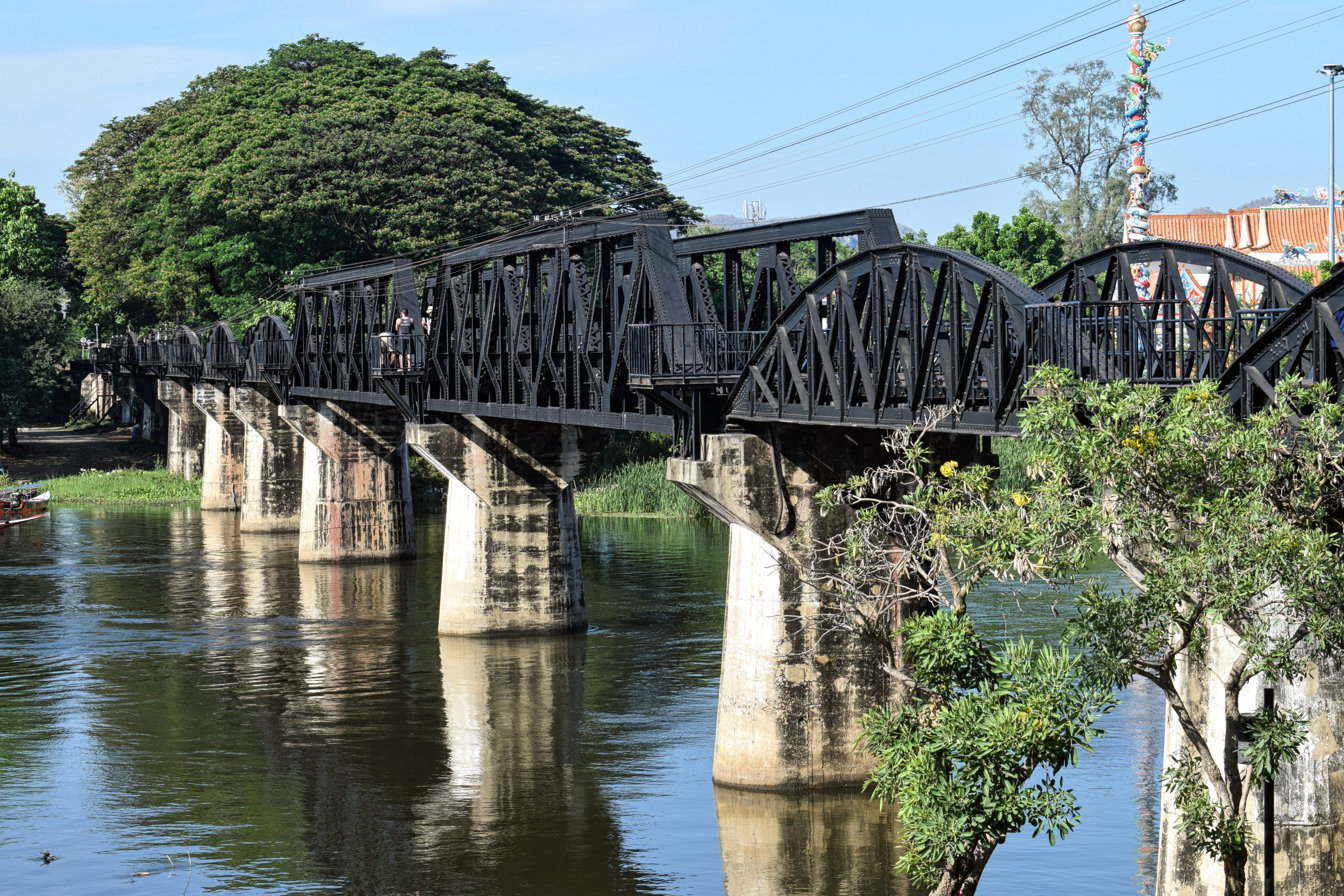
The River Kwai railway bridge in 2017. The arched sections are original (constructed for the Empire of Japan during the Second World War); the two sections with trapezoidal trusses were built by Japan after the war as war reparations, replacing sections destroyed by Allied aircraft.

The plot and characters of Boulle's novel and the screenplay were fictional. There are many historical inaccuracies in the film, as noted by historians citing eyewitnesses to the building of the real Burma Railway.

The conditions to which POW and civilian laborers were subjected were far worse than the film depicted. According to the Commonwealth War Graves Commission:

The notorious Burma-Siam railway, built by Commonwealth, Dutch and American prisoners of war, was a Japanese project driven by the need for improved communications to support the large Japanese army in Burma. During its construction, approximately 13,000 prisoners of war died and were buried along the railway. An estimated 80,000 to 100,000 civilians also died in the course of the project, chiefly forced labour brought from Malaya and the Dutch East Indies, or conscripted in Siam (Thailand) and Burma. Two labour forces, one based in Siam and the other in Burma, worked from opposite ends of the line towards the centre.

Lieutenant Colonel Philip Toosey of the British Army was the senior Allied officer at the bridge in question. Toosey was very different from Nicholson and was not a collaborator who felt obliged to work with the Japanese. Toosey strove to delay construction. While Nicholson disapproves of acts of sabotage and other deliberate attempts to delay progress, Toosey encouraged this: termites were collected in large numbers to eat the wooden structures, and the concrete was badly mixed. Some consider the film to be an insulting parody of Lt. Col. Toosey.

Julie Summers, in her book The Colonel of Tamarkan, writes that Boulle, who had been a prisoner of war in Thailand, created the fictional Nicholson character as an amalgam of his memories of collaborating French officers. He strongly denied the claim that the book was anti-British, although many involved in the film itself (including Alec Guinness) felt otherwise.

Ernest Gordon, a survivor of the railway construction and POW camps, stated in his 1962 book, Through the Valley of the Kwai:

In Pierre Boulle's book The Bridge over the River Kwai and the film which was based on it, the impression was given that British officers not only took part in building the bridge willingly, but finished in record time to demonstrate to the enemy their superior efficiency. This was an entertaining story. But I am writing a factual account, and in justice to these men—living and dead—who worked on that bridge, I must make it clear that we never did so willingly. We worked at bayonet point and under bamboo lash, taking any risk to sabotage the operation whenever the opportunity arose.

A 1969 BBC television documentary, Return to the River Kwai, made by former POW John Coast, sought to highlight the real history behind the film (partly through getting ex-POWs to question its factual basis, for example Dr Hugh de Wardener and Lt-Col Alfred Knights), which angered many former POWs. The documentary itself was described by one newspaper reviewer when it was shown on Boxing Day 1974 (The Bridge on the River Kwai had been shown on BBC1 on Christmas Day 1974) as "Following the movie, this is a rerun of the antidote."

Some of the characters in the film use the names of real people who were involved in the Burma Railway. Their roles and characters, however, are fictionalized. For example, a Sergeant-Major Risaburo Saito was in real life second in command at the camp. In the film, a Colonel Saito is camp commandant. In reality, Risaburo Saito was respected by his prisoners for being comparatively merciful and fair towards them. Toosey later defended him in his war crimes trial after the war, and the two became friends. Some Japanese viewers objected to the film's "implication that they are incapable engineers".

The major railway bridge described in the novel and film did not actually cross the river known at the time as the Kwai. However, in 1943 a railway bridge was built by Allied POWs over the Mae Klong river—renamed Khwae Yai in the 1960s as a result of the film—at Tha Ma Kham, five kilometers from Kanchanaburi, Thailand. Boulle had never been to the bridge. He knew that the railway ran parallel to the Kwae for many miles, and he therefore assumed that it was the Kwae which it crossed just north of Kanchanaburi. This was an incorrect assumption. The destruction of the bridge as depicted in the film is also entirely fictional. Two bridges were built: a temporary wooden bridge and a permanent steel/concrete bridge a few months later. Both bridges were used for two years, until they were destroyed by Allied bombing. The steel bridge was repaired and is still in use today.

== Reception ==
=== Box office ===
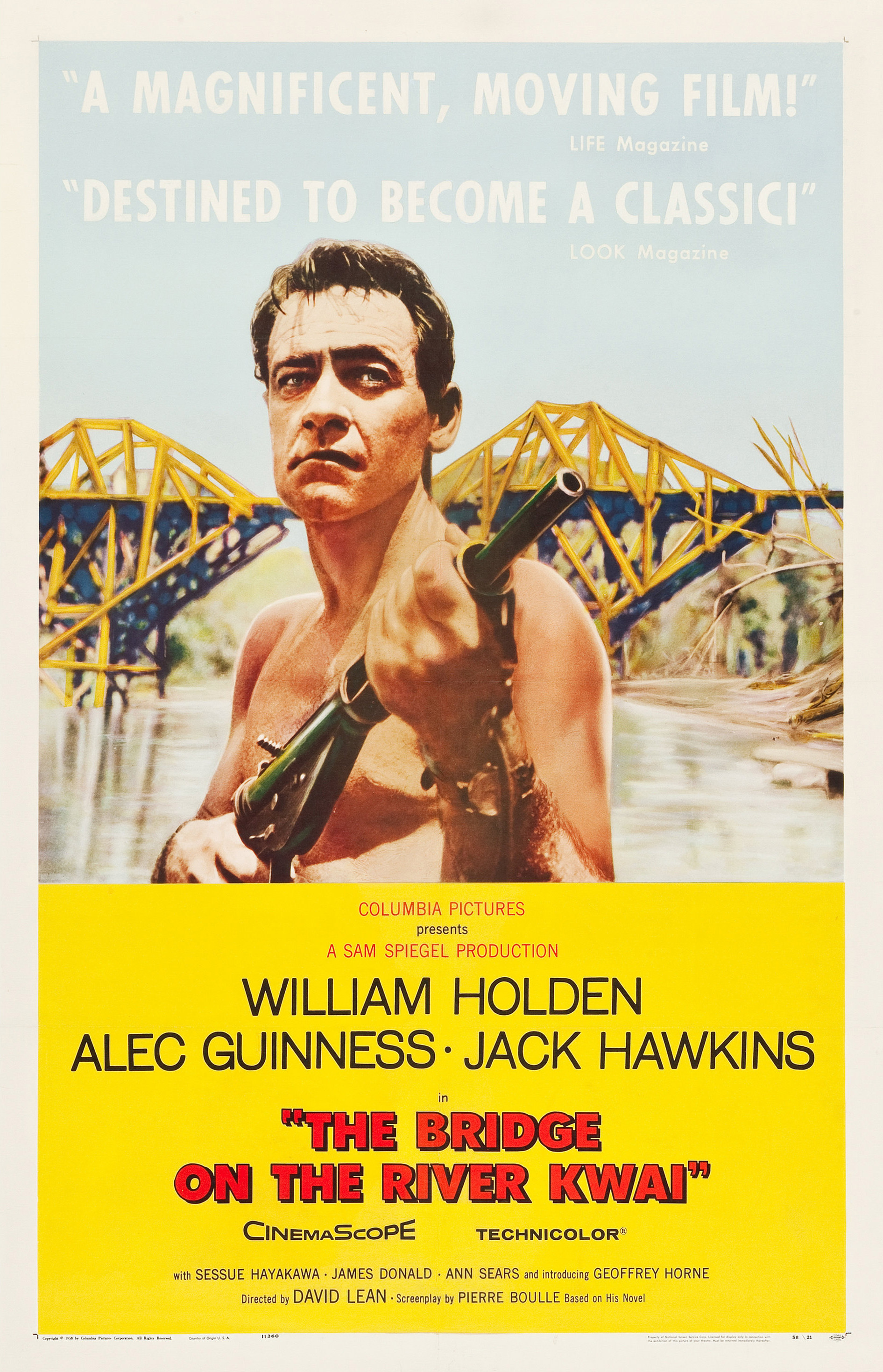
American theatrical release poster, "Style B", featuring Holden.

The Bridge on the River Kwai was a commercial success. It was the highest-grossing film of 1957 in the United States and Canada and was also the most popular film at the British box office that year. According to Variety, the film earned estimated domestic box office revenues of $18,000,000 although this was revised downward the following year to $15,000,000, which was still the biggest for 1958 and Columbia's highest-grossing film at the time. By October 1960, the film had earned worldwide box office revenues of $30 million.

The film was re-released in 1964 and earned a further estimated $2.6 million at the box office in the United States and Canada but the following year its revised total US and Canadian revenues were reported by Variety as $17,195,000.

=== Critical response ===
Contemporary reviews were highly favorable.

Bosley Crowther of The New York Times praised the film as "a towering entertainment of rich variety and revelation of the ways of men". Mike Kaplan, reviewing for Variety, described it as "a gripping drama, expertly put together and handled with skill in all departments." Kaplan further praised the actors, especially Alec Guinness, later writing "the film is unquestionably" his. William Holden was also credited for his acting for giving a solid characterization that was "easy, credible and always likeable in a role that is the pivot point of the story". Edwin Schallert of the Los Angeles Times claimed the film's strongest points were for being "excellently produced in virtually all respects and that it also offers an especially outstanding and different performance by Alec Guinness. Highly competent work is also done by William Holden, Jack Hawkins and Sessue Hayakawa". Time magazine praised Lean's directing, noting he demonstrates "a dazzlingly musical sense and control of the many and involving rhythms of a vast composition. He shows a rare sense of humor and a feeling for the poetry of situation; and he shows the even rarer ability to express these things, not in lines but in lives." Harrison's Reports described the film as an "excellent World War II adventure melodrama" in which the "production values are first-rate and so is the photography."

Among retrospective reviews, Roger Ebert gave the film four out of four stars, noting in 1999 that it is one of the few war movies that "focuses not on larger rights and wrongs but on individuals", but commented that the viewer is not certain what is intended by the final dialogue due to the film's shifting points of view. Slant magazine gave the film four out of five stars.

Slant stated in 2010 that "the 1957 epic subtly develops its themes about the irrationality of honor and the hypocrisy of Britain's class system without ever compromising its thrilling war narrative", and in comparing to other films of the time said that Bridge on the River Kwai "carefully builds its psychological tension until it erupts in a blinding flash of sulfur and flame."

On review aggregator website Rotten Tomatoes, the film received an approval rating of 96% based on 105 reviews, with an average rating of 9.4/10. The site's critical consensus reads, "This complex war epic asks hard questions, resists easy answers, and boasts career-defining work from star Alec Guinness and director David Lean." On Metacritic, the film has a weighted average score of 88 out of 100 based on 15 critics, indicating "universal acclaim".

Tamil film director Balu Mahendra observed the shooting of the film at Kitulgala, Sri Lanka during his school trip and was inspired to become a film director. Warren Buffett said it was his favorite film. In an interview, he said that "[t]here were a lot of lessons in that... The ending of that was sort of the story of life. He created the railroad. Did he really want the enemy to come in across it?"

=== Accolades ===
Award	Category	Nominee(s)	Result
Academy Awards	Best Picture	Sam Spiegel	Won
Academy Awards	Best Director	David Lean	Won
Academy Awards	Best Actor	Alec Guinness	Won
Academy Awards	Best Supporting Actor	Sessue Hayakawa	Nominated
Academy Awards	Best Screenplay – Based on Material from Another Medium	Michael Wilson, Carl Foreman, and Pierre Boulle	Won
Academy Awards	Best Cinematography	Jack Hildyard	Won
Academy Awards	Best Film Editing	Peter Taylor	Won
Academy Awards	Best Original Score	Malcolm Arnold	Won
British Academy Film Awards	Best Film		Won
British Academy Film Awards	Best British Film		Won
British Academy Film Awards	Best British Actor	Alec Guinness	Won
British Academy Film Awards	Best British Screenplay	Pierre Boulle	Won
British Society of Cinematographers Awards	Best Cinematography in a Theatrical Feature Film	Jack Hildyard	Won
David di Donatello Awards	Best Foreign Production	Sam Spiegel	Won
Directors Guild of America Awards	Outstanding Directorial Achievement in Motion Pictures	David Lean	Won
DVD Exclusive Awards	Best DVD Menu Design		Nominated
DVD Exclusive Awards	Best DVD Original Retrospective Documentary/Featurette	Laurent Bouzereau	Nominated
Golden Globe Awards	Best Motion Picture – Drama		Won
Golden Globe Awards	Best Actor in a Motion Picture – Drama	Alec Guinness	Won
Golden Globe Awards	Best Supporting Actor – Motion Picture	Sessue Hayakawa	Nominated
Golden Globe Awards	Best Director – Motion Picture	David Lean	Won
Golden Screen Awards	Golden Screen		Won
Golden Screen Awards	Golden Screen with 1 Star		Won
Grammy Awards	Best Sound Track Album, Dramatic Picture Score or Original Cast	Malcolm Arnold	Nominated
Laurel Awards	Top Drama		Nominated
Laurel Awards	Top Male Dramatic Performance	Alec Guinness	Nominated
National Board of Review Awards	Best Film		Won
National Board of Review Awards	Top Ten Films		Won
National Board of Review Awards	Best Director	David Lean	Won
National Board of Review Awards	Best Actor	Alec Guinness	Won
National Board of Review Awards	Best Supporting Actor	Sessue Hayakawa	Won
National Film Preservation Board	National Film Registry		Inducted
New York Film Critics Circle Awards	Best Film		Won
New York Film Critics Circle Awards	Best Director	David Lean	Won
New York Film Critics Circle Awards	Best Actor	Alec Guinness	Won
Online Film & Television Association Awards	Hall of Fame – Motion Picture		Honored
Sant Jordi Awards	Best Foreign Actor	Alec Guinness	Won

American Film Institute lists:

- 1998 — AFI's 100 Years...100 Movies — No. 13
- 2001 — AFI's 100 Years...100 Thrills — No. 58
- 2006 — AFI's 100 Years...100 Cheers — No. 14
- 2007 — AFI's 100 Years...100 Movies (10th Anniversary Edition) — No. 36

The film has been selected for preservation in the United States National Film Registry in 1997.

The British Film Institute placed The Bridge on the River Kwai as the 11th greatest British film, in 1999.

== First TV broadcast ==
ABC paid a record $1.8 million for the television rights for two TV broadcasts in the United States. The 167-minute film was first broadcast uncut and in color on the evening of 25 September 1966, as an ABC Movie Special, sponsored by the Ford Motor Company. The broadcast of the film was over three hours long, including commercial breaks. It was highly unusual at that time for a television network to show such a long film in one evening; most longer films were generally shown in two parts over two consecutive evenings. The film drew huge ratings for ABC, with a record audience of 72 million and a Nielsen rating of 38.3 and an audience share of 61%.

== Restorations and home video releases ==
In 1972, the film was among the first selection of films released on the early Cartrivision video format, alongside classics such as The Jazz Singer and Sands of Iwo Jima.

The film was restored in 1985 by Columbia Pictures. The separate dialogue, music and effects were located and remixed with newly recorded "atmospheric" sound effects. The image was restored by OCS, Freeze Frame, and Pixel Magic with George Hively editing.

On 2 November 2010 Columbia Pictures released a restored The Bridge on the River Kwai on Blu-ray. According to Columbia Pictures, they followed a 4K digital restoration from the original negative with restored 5.1 audio. The original negative for the feature was scanned at 4K (four times the resolution in High Definition), and the color correction and digital restoration were also completed at 4K. The negative had several issues: torn frames, embedded emulsion dirt, scratches through every reel, color fading. Unique to the film, in some ways, were other issues related to poorly made optical dissolves, the original camera lens and a malfunctioning camera. These problems resulted in a number of anomalies that were very difficult to correct, like a ghosting effect in many scenes that resembles color mis-registration, and a tick-like effect with the image jumping or jerking side-to-side. These issues, running throughout the film, were addressed to a lesser extent on various previous DVD releases of the film and might not have been so obvious in standard definition.

== In popular culture ==
- In 1962, Spike Milligan and Peter Sellers, with Peter Cook and Jonathan Miller, released the LP record Bridge on the River Wye (Parlophone LP PMC 1190, PCS 3036 (November 1962)). This spoof of the film was based on the script for the 1957 Goon Show episode "An African Incident". Shortly before its release, for legal reasons, producer George Martin edited out the 'K' every time the word 'Kwai' was spoken.
- The comedy team of Wayne and Shuster performed a sketch titled "Kwai Me a River" on their 27 March 1967 TV show, in which an officer in the British Dental Corps (Wayne) is captured by the Japanese and, despite being comically unintimidated by any abuse the commander of the POW camp (Shuster) inflicts on him, is forced to build a (dental) "bridge on the river Kwai" for the commander and plans to include an explosive in the appliance to detonate in his mouth. The commander survives the explosion, attributed to a toothpaste commercial punchline in 1960s commercials.
- The film was referenced in the lyrics of the 1989 Billy Joel song “We Didn’t Start the Fire”.

== See also ==
- BFI Top 100 British films
- List of American films of 1957
- List of historical drama films
- List of historical drama films of Asia
- To End All Wars (film)
- Return from the River Kwai (1989 film)
- Siam-Burma Death Railway (film)

== Bibliography ==
- Santas, Constantine (2012). The Epic Films of David Lean. Scarecrow Press. ISBN 978-0-8108-8210-2.
- Ebert, Roger (8 May 2012). 33 Movies to Restore Your Faith in Humanity: Ebert's Essentials. Andrews McMeel Publishing. ISBN 978-1-4494-2225-7.
- Phillips, Gene (24 November 2006). Beyond the Epic: The Life and Films of David Lean. University Press of Kentucky. p. 255. ISBN 0-8131-7155-5.
- Niemi, Robert (2006). History in the Media: Film and Television. ABC-CLIO. p. 96. ISBN 978-1-57607-952-2.
- Roche, Mark William (1998). Tragedy and Comedy: A Systematic Study and a Critique of Hegel. SUNY Press. p. 65. ISBN 978-0-7914-3546-5.
- Margulies, Ivone (6 March 2003). Rites of Realism: Essays on Corporeal Cinema. Duke University Press. p. 3. ISBN 0-8223-8461-2.
- Capua, Michelangelo (9 October 2009). William Holden: A Biography. McFarland. p. 98. ISBN 978-0-7864-5550-8.
- Larkin, Brian (10 March 2008). Signal and Noise: Media, Infrastructure, and Urban Culture in Nigeria. Duke University Press. p. 7. ISBN 978-0-8223-8931-6.
- Ray, Robert Beverley (1985). A Certain Tendency of the Hollywood Cinema, 1930-1980. Princeton University Press. p. 174. ISBN 0-691-10174-4.
- Grimes, Charles W. (1 January 2003). Trademark & Copyright Disputes: Litigation Forms and Analysis. Aspen Publishers Online. p. 3. ISBN 978-0-7355-3515-2.
- Monaco, Paul (2010). A History of American Movies: A Film-by-film Look at the Art, Craft, and Business of Cinema. Scarecrow Press. p. 349. ISBN 978-0-8108-7433-6.
- Roberts, Jonny. How has the representation of World War II on film changed from 1939 to 2009. Jonny Roberts. p. 43. GGKEY:HTN6JK1YKP8.
- Santas, Constantine (2002). Responding to Film: A Text Guide for Students of Cinema Art. Rowman & Littlefield. p. 66. ISBN 978-0-8304-1580-9.
- Hall, Sheldon (15 April 2010). Epics, Spectacles, and Blockbusters: A Hollywood History. Wayne State University Press. p. 168. ISBN 978-0-8143-3697-7.
- Singh, Dr. Laxman Swaroop (2 October 2009). The Obsidian Eye: Cat Journeys Through an Impossible Universe. PublishAmerica. p. 121. ISBN 978-1-4512-2353-8.
- Harris, Mark (14 February 2008). Pictures at a Revolution: Five Movies and the Birth of the New Hollywood. Penguin Publishing Group. p. 124. ISBN 978-1-101-20285-2.
- Huda, Anwar (1 January 2004). The Art and Science of Cinema. Atlantic Publishers & Dist. p. 154. ISBN 978-81-269-0348-1.
- Braddock, Jeremy; Hock, Stephen (2001). Directed by Allen Smithee. U of Minnesota Press. p. 113. ISBN 978-0-8166-3533-7.
- Medavoy, Mike (7 January 2003). You're Only as Good as Your Next One: 100 Great Films, 100 Good Films, and 100 for Which I Should Be Shot. Simon and Schuster. p. 67. ISBN 978-0-7434-0055-8.
- Fuller, Karla Rae (16 August 2010). Hollywood Goes Oriental: CaucAsian Performance in American Film. Wayne State University Press. p. 23. ISBN 978-0-8143-3538-3.
