= Coaching tree =

Chart displaying professional relationships between sports coaches

A coaching tree is similar to a family tree except it shows the relationships of coaches instead of family members. There are several ways to define a relationship between two coaches. The most common way to make the distinction is if a coach worked as an assistant on a particular head coach's staff for at least a season then that coach can be counted as being a branch on the head coach's coaching tree. Coaching trees can also show philosophical influence from one head coach to an assistant.

Coaching trees are common in the National Football League and most coaches in the NFL can trace their lineage back to a certain head coach for whom they previously worked as an assistant.

The phrase "coaching tree" has also grown to refer colloquially to any idea or set of ideas originated by an individual or group. For example, an individual may claim an original idiom or phrase as part of their coaching tree if used by another individual.

Coaching trees are becoming more prominent in today's NFL culture. They are often referenced by various media outlets, such as ESPN.

== Examples ==
In 1998, half of the active head coaches in the National Football League could be traced to Bill Walsh and Tom Landry. Of those fifteen coaches, four (plus Walsh and Landry) had coached a Super Bowl winning team.

20 years later, in 2018, an ESPN article showed visually how 28 of the 32 coaches who would serve as NFL head coaches in the upcoming season were connected to head coaches Bill Parcells and Bill Belichick. The only team that was not profiled in this particular story was the Indianapolis Colts, who had not yet hired a head coach at the time of the article. The Colts later hired Frank Reich. The only three NFL head coaches who couldn't be connected to either Parcells or Belichick, according to this said article, were the following coaches: Andy Reid of the Kansas City Chiefs, Matt Nagy of the Chicago Bears, and Doug Pederson of the Philadelphia Eagles. Incidentally, both Pederson and Nagy were once former assistants under Reid before becoming head coaches. Additionally, before Reich became head coach of the Colts, he served as Pederson's offensive coordinator of the Eagles, and helped Philadelphia win Super Bowl LII. Therefore, Reich is connected to Reid through Pederson.

Los Angeles Rams head coach Sean McVay currently has one of the fastest growing coaching trees in the NFL. Although he has only been the team's head coach since 2017, McVay has seen five of his assistants go on to become head coaches elsewhere. Matt LaFleur (Green Bay Packers), Zac Taylor (Cincinnati Bengals), Brandon Staley (Los Angeles Chargers), Kevin O'Connell (Minnesota Vikings), and most recently Raheem Morris (Atlanta Falcons) are currently or were previously head coaches who coached under McVay at some point. Many of his other assistants have taken promotions to become coordinators, as well.

In October 2018, The Washington Post published their own article about NFL coaching trees, mapping out the roots, influences and origins of every active NFL head coach.

Coaching tree examples (shown visually below) for Bill Walsh & Marty Schottenheimer:

Note: Trees updated through 2020. (Note: Trees compiled with data from Wall Street Journal article from December 9, 2015. Ben McAdoo was hired by the New York Giants as head coach in 2016 after previously being an assistant coach under Mike McCarthy (Schottenheimer's coaching tree).)

== Philosophical tree connections ==
Coaching trees can also show a philosophical relationship between a mentor head coach and their protégé. Below is a list of current and former head coaches and who they primarily developed their philosophy under:

- Norv Turner: Most recently, Turner worked as an offensive coordinator under Mike Nolan in San Francisco. However, Nolan previously worked under Turner when he was the head coach with the Redskins as a defensive coordinator 1997–1999. Also, before getting his first head coaching job with the Redskins in 1994, Turner worked under both John Robinson in Los Angeles and Jimmy Johnson in Dallas.
- Wade Phillips: Coached under Marty Schottenheimer, but primarily learned his philosophy from his father, Bum Phillips.
- Jon Gruden: Worked under Mike Holmgren in Green Bay.
- Tony Dungy: Dungy is listed above as part of the Schottenheimer coaching tree and was a Defensive Coordinator under Dennis Green. However, Dungy attributes most of his coaching style from tutelage under Chuck Noll. Noll learned much of his own philosophy from Paul Brown. Noll coached Dungy as a player and also gave him his first NFL position as the defensive backs coach of the Pittsburgh Steelers. Dungy later became the defensive coordinator for the Steelers.
- Todd Haley: Coached under Bill Parcells and learned his philosophy from him for many years before joining Ken Whisenhunt in Arizona, in 2007.
- Steve Spagnuolo: While Spagnuolo is credited under Tom Coughlin and Bill Parcells tree, he studied and learned much of his style and system during his tenure in Philadelphia under Jim Johnson and Andy Reid. Spagnuolo took Johnson's style of play to New York where he gained national attention for his scheming and personnel packages that helped shut down New England in the Super Bowl, one of the biggest upsets in NFL history. He then took that defense to St. Louis.
- Jack Del Rio: Del Rio worked under Marvin Lewis on the Ravens' defensive staff. However, Del Río got his coaching start from Mike Ditka in New Orleans, and then worked as defensive coordinator under John Fox in Carolina before being hired by Jacksonville in 2003.

Additionally, many college football coaches worked as assistants for head coaches on the tree. For instance, Bill Belichick can claim Kirk Ferentz, Nick Saban, and Charlie Weis as descendants of his tree, though they are not included in the graphic above.

- Bum Phillips coached under Gillman with the Oilers, and was chosen by Gillman to succeed him upon Gillman's stepping down from the head coaching job of the Houston Oilers.

== The Bill Belichick Tree ==
The Bill Belichick coaching tree is a far-reaching one. During Belichick's long-tenured career as an NFL head coach, 17 assistant coaches under him have gone on to become head coaches in both the NFL and college. They then sprouted their own trees, leading to over 100 total offshoots, which include 12 active NFL head coaches.

- Bill Belichick, Cleveland Browns (1991–1995), New England Patriots (2000–2023), North Carolina (2025-present)
  - Nick Saban, Toledo (1990), Michigan State (1995–1999), LSU (2000–2004), Miami Dolphins (2005–2006), Alabama (2007–2023)
    - Dean Pees, Kent State (1998–2003)
    - Bobby Williams, Michigan State (2000–2002)
      - Don Treadwell, Miami (OH) (2011–2013)
      - Ben McAdoo, New York Giants (2016–2017)
      - Robert Saleh, New York Jets (2021–2024), Tennessee Titans (2026-present)
    - Mike Stoops, Arizona (2004–2011)
      - Josh Heupel, UCF (2018–2020), Tennessee (2021–present)
    - Mark Dantonio, Cincinnati (2004–2006), Michigan State (2007–2020)
      - Dan Enos, Central Michigan (2010–2014)
      - Pat Narduzzi, Pittsburgh (2015–present)
        - Josh Conklin, Wofford (2018–2022)
    - Brad Salem, Augustana College (Illinois) (2005–2009)
    - Scott Linehan, St. Louis Rams (2006–2008)
    - Derek Dooley, Louisiana Tech (2007–2009), Tennessee (2010–2012)
      - Brandon Staley, San Diego Chargers, (2021–2023)
      - Tommy Spangler, Presbyterian (2017–2020)
      - Justin Wilcox, California (2017–present)
        - Beau Baldwin, Cal Poly (2020–present)
      - Frank Scelfo, Southeastern Louisiana (2018–present)
      - Sam Pittman, Arkansas (2020–2025)
        - Barry Odom, Missouri (2016–2019), UNLV (2023–present)
    - Josh McDaniels, Denver Broncos (2009–2010), Las Vegas Raiders (2022–2023) (first served under Saban)
    - Mike Haywood, Miami (OH) (2009–2010), Texas Southern (2016–2018)
    - Jimbo Fisher, Florida State (2010–2017), Texas A&M (2018–2023)
      - Bobby Petrino, Louisville (2003–2006; 2014–2018), Atlanta Falcons (2007), Arkansas (2008–2011), Western Kentucky (2013), Missouri State (2020–2022)
        - John L. Smith, Idaho (1989-1994), Utah State (1995-1997), Louisville (1998-2002), Michigan State (2003-2006), Arkansas (2012), Fort Lewis (2013-2015), Kentucky State (2016-2018)
          - Paul Petrino, Idaho (2013-2021)
        - Jonathan Gannon, Arizona Cardinals (2023–2025)
      - Mark Stoops, Kentucky (2013–2025)
        - Neal Brown, Troy (2015–2018); West Virginia (2019–2024); North Texas (2026-present)
        - Dean Hood, Murray State (2019–present)
      - Randy Sanders, East Tennessee State (2018–2021)
    - Jason Garrett, Dallas Cowboys (2010–2019)
    - Curt Cignetti, IUP (2011–2016), Elon (2017–2018), James Madison (2019–2023), Indiana (2024–present)
    - Pat Shurmur, Cleveland Browns (2011–2012), New York Giants (2018–2019)
      - Mark Whipple, UMass (2014–2018)
    - Will Muschamp, Florida (2011–2014), South Carolina (2016–2020)
      - D. J. Durkin: Maryland (2016–2017)
        - Walt Bell: UMass (2019–2021)
      - Jeff Choate: Montana State (2016–2020)
      - Shawn Elliott: Georgia State (2017–present)
    - Mike Mularkey, Jacksonville Jaguars (2012), Tennessee Titans (2016–2017)
    - Jim McElwain, Colorado State (2012–2014), Florida (2015–2017), Central Michigan (2019–present)
    - Brian Polian, Nevada (2013-2016)
      - Nick Rolovich, Hawaii (2016–2019), Washington State (2020–2021)
      - James Spady, Alabama A&M (2014–2017)
    - Dan Quinn, Atlanta Falcons (2015–2020), Washington Commanders (2024-present)
      - Kyle Shanahan, San Francisco 49ers (2017–present)
        - Jeff Hafley, Boston College (2020–2023), Miami Dolphins (2026-present)
        - Robert Saleh, New York Jets (2021–2024), Tennessee Titans (2026-present)
      - Charlie Jackson, Kentucky State (2019–2021)
      - Matt LaFleur, Green Bay Packers (2019–present)
        - Nathaniel Hackett, Denver Broncos (2022)
      - Mike McDaniel, Miami Dolphins (2022–2025)
    - Adam Gase, Miami Dolphins (2016–2018), New York Jets (2019–2020)
    - Kirby Smart, Georgia (2016–present)
    - Major Applewhite, Houston (2016–2018)
    - Geoff Collins, Temple (2017-2018), Georgia Tech (2019–2022)
    - Mario Cristobal, Oregon (2017–2021), Miami (2022-present)
      - Marcus Arroyo, UNLV (2020–2022)
    - Jeremy Pruitt, Tennessee (2018–2020)
      - Tyson Helton, Western Kentucky (2019–present)
    - Billy Napier, Louisiana (2018–2021), Florida (2022–present)
    - Mike Locksley, Maryland (2019–present)
    - Mel Tucker, Colorado (2019), Michigan State (2020–2023)
    - Freddie Kitchens, Cleveland Browns (2019)
    - Joe Judge, New York Giants (2020–2021) (first served under Saban)
  - Rod Dowhower, Vanderbilt (1995-1996)
    - Ken Whisenhunt, Arizona Cardinals (2007–2012), Tennessee Titans (2014–2015)
      - Frank Reich, Indianapolis Colts (2018–2022), Carolina Panthers (2023)
      - Arthur Smith, Atlanta Falcons (2021-2023)
  - Pat Hill, Fresno State (1997–2011)
    - Lane Kiffin, Oakland Raiders (2007-2008), Tennessee (2009), USC (2010-2013), Florida Atlantic (2017-2019), Ole Miss (2020-present)
      - Tom Cable, Oakland Raiders (2008–2010)
        - Hue Jackson, Oakland Raiders (2011), Cleveland Browns (2016–2018)
      - Clay Helton, USC (2016–2021)
      - Frank Wilson, UTSA (2016–2019)
      - Ed Orgeron, Ole Miss (2005–2007), USC (2013), LSU (2016–2021)
        - Dave Aranda, Baylor (2020–present)
    - Trent Miles, Indiana State (2008–2012), Georgia State (2013–2016)
    - Jim McElwain, Colorado State (2012–2014), Florida (2015–2017), Central Michigan (2019–present)
  - Woody Widenhofer, Vanderbilt (1997-2001)
  - Kirk Ferentz, Iowa (1999–present)
    - Bret Bielema, Wisconsin (2006-2012), Arkansas (2013–2017), Illinois (2021–present) (first under Ferentz)
      - Dave Doeren, Northern Illinois (2011–2012), NC State (2013–present)
        - Rod Carey, Northern Illinois (2012–2018), Temple (2019–2021)
        - Tom Matukewicz, Southeast Missouri State (2014–present)
        - Eliah Drinkwitz, Appalachian State (2019), Missouri (2020-present)
          - Shawn Clark, Appalachian State (2020–2024)
      - Paul Chryst, Pittsburgh (2012–2014), Wisconsin (2015–2022)
      - Charlie Partridge, Florida Atlantic (2014–2016)
      - Thomas Hammock, Northern Illinois (2019–present)
    - Chuck Long, San Diego State (2006–2008)
      - Chris Ash, Rutgers (2016–2019)
    - Joe Philbin, Miami Dolphins (2012–2015)
      - Dan Campbell, Detroit Lions (2021–present)
      - Zac Taylor, Cincinnati Bengals (2019–present)
        - Brian Callahan, Tennessee Titans (2024-2025)
  - Al Groh, New York Jets (2000), Virginia (2001–2009)
    - Mike Nolan, San Francisco 49ers (2005–2008)
      - Mike McCarthy, Green Bay Packers (2006–2018), Dallas Cowboys (2020–present)
      - Mike Singletary, San Francisco 49ers (2009–2010)
      - Vance Joseph, Denver Broncos (2017–2018)
    - Ron Prince, Kansas State (2006–2008), Howard (2019)
      - Raheem Morris, Tampa Bay Buccaneers (2009–2011), Atlanta Falcons (2024-2025)
        - Jimmy Lake, Washington Huskies (2020–2021)
      - Dave Brock, Delaware (2013–2016)
      - James Franklin, Vanderbilt (2011–2013), Penn State (2014–2025), Virginia Tech (2026-present)
        - Joe Moorhead, Mississippi State (2018–2019)
      - Scott Frost, UCF (2016–2017), Nebraska (2018–2022)
      - Ricky Rahne, Old Dominion (2020-present)
    - Al Golden, Temple (2006–2010), Miami (2011–2015)
      - Matt Rhule, Temple (2013–2016), Baylor (2017–2020), Carolina Panthers (2020–2022), Nebraska (2023-present)
      - Ryan Day, Ohio State (2019–present)
      - Larry Scott, Howard (2020–present)
    - Danny Rocco, Liberty (2006–2011), Richmond (2012–2016), Delaware (2017–2021), VMI (2023–present)
    - Mike London, Richmond (2008–2009), Virginia (2010–2015), Howard (2017–2018), William & Mary (2019–present)
      - Russ Huesman, Chattanooga (2009–2016), Richmond (2017–present)
        - Will Healy, Austin Peay (2016–2018), Charlotte (2019–2022) East Tennessee (2025-present)
        - Marcus Satterfield, Tennessee Tech (2016–2017)
        - Rusty Wright, Chattanooga (2019–present)
      - Vic Shealy, Houston Baptist (2013–present)
      - Scott Wachenheim, VMI (2015–present)
    - Todd Haley, Kansas City Chiefs (2009–2011)
      - Nick Sirianni, Philadelphia Eagles (2021–present)
    - Latrell Scott, Richmond (2010), Virginia State (2013–2014), Norfolk State (2015–2020)
    - Bob Diaco, UConn (2014–2016)
    - Todd Bowles, New York Jets (2015–2018), Tampa Bay Buccaneers (2022–present)
      - Dave Canales, Carolina Panthers (2024–present)
    - Gregg Brandon, Colorado Mines (2015–present)
    - John Garrett, Lafayette (2017–2021)
  - Charlie Weis, Notre Dame (2005–2009), Kansas (2011–2014)
    - Rob Ianello, Akron (2010–2011)
      - Curt Mallory, Indiana State (2017–present)
  - Romeo Crennel, Cleveland Browns (2005–2008), Kansas City Chiefs (2011–2012)
    - Anthony Lynn, Los Angeles Chargers (2017–2020)
  - Eric Mangini, New York Jets (2006–2008), Cleveland Browns (2009–2010)
    - Mike Bloomgren, Rice (2018–present)
    - Matt Eberflus Chicago Bears (2022–2024)
  - Jim Schwartz, Detroit Lions (2009–2013)
    - John Bonamego, Central Michigan (2015–2018)
  - Josh McDaniels, Denver Broncos (2009–2010), Las Vegas Raiders (2022–2023)
    - Mike McCoy, San Diego Chargers (2013–2016)
      - Shane Steichen, Indianapolis Colts (2023–present)
  - DeWayne Walker, New Mexico State (2009–2012)
    - Dale Lindsey, San Diego (2013–2022)
    - Doug Martin, New Mexico State (2013–2021)
    - Timm Rosenbach, Adams State (2015–2017)
  - Pete Mangurian, Columbia (2012–2014)
  - Bill O'Brien, Penn State (2012–2013), Houston Texans (2014–2020)
    - Charlie Fisher, Western Illinois (2016–2017)
      - Jared Elliott, Western Illinois (2018–present)
    - Mike Vrabel, Tennessee Titans (2018–2023), New England Patriots (2025-present) (played under Belichick first)
  - Matt Patricia, Detroit Lions (2018–2020)
  - Brian Flores, Miami Dolphins (2019–2021)
    - Karl Dorrell, Colorado (2020–2022)
  - Joe Judge, New York Giants (2020–2021)
  - Bret Bielema, Illinois (2021–present)
  - Jedd Fisch, Arizona Wildcats (2021–2023), Washington Huskies (2024–present)
  - Brian Daboll, New York Giants (2022–2025)

== The Nick Saban Tree ==
Nick Saban is another coach with a large coaching tree. According to a 2026 ESPN article, 45 different college and NFL head coaches have served as assistants on Saban's coaching staffs over the course of his coaching career.
