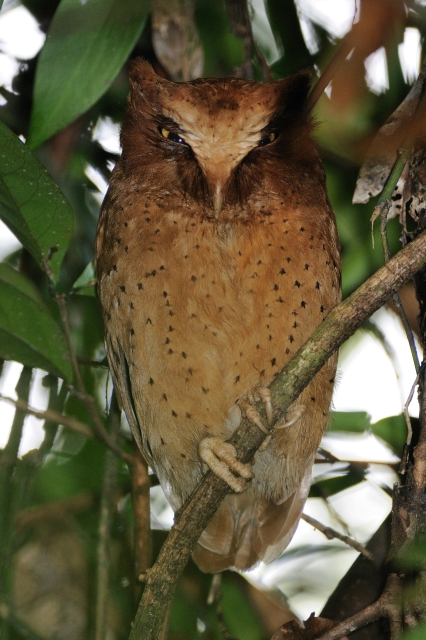
- Serendib scops owl

Conservation status
- Endangered (IUCN 3.1)
- CITES Appendix II

Scientific classification
- Kingdom: Animalia
- Phylum: Chordata
- Class: Aves
- Order: Strigiformes
- Family: Strigidae
- Genus: Otus
- Species: O. thilohoffmanni

Binomial name
- Otus thilohoffmanni Warakagoda & Rasmussen, 2004
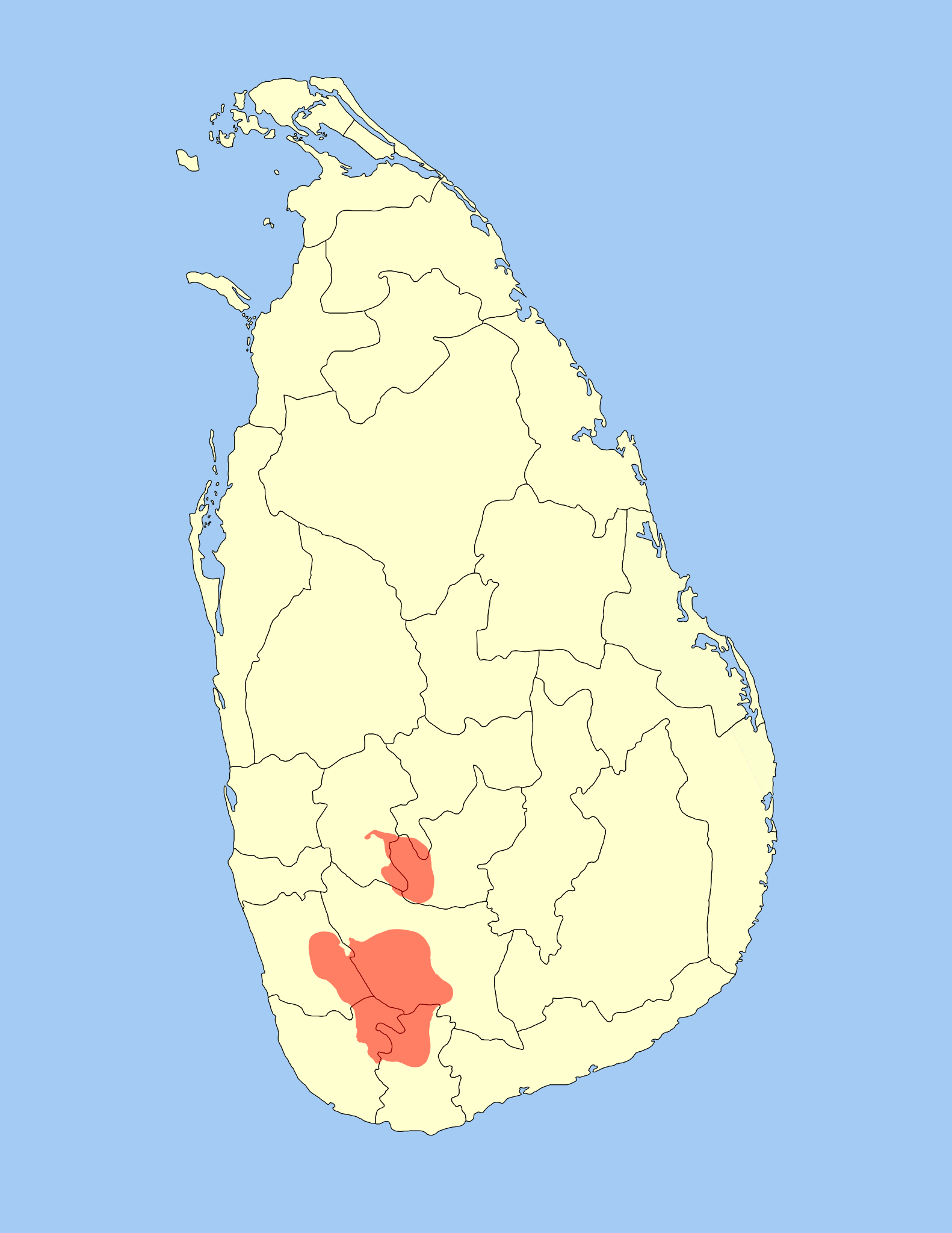

= Serendib scops owl =

Species of owl

The Serendib scops owl (Otus thilohoffmanni) is the most recently discovered bird of Sri Lanka. It was originally located by its unfamiliar poo-ooo call in the Kitulgala rainforest by prominent Sri Lankan ornithologist Deepal Warakagoda. Six years later, it was finally seen by him on 23 January 2001 in Sinharaja, and formally described as a species new to science in 2004. Apart from Sinharaja and Kitulgala, it has also been found at Runakanda Reserve in Morapitiya and Eratna Gilimale. It is known as පඬුවන් බස්සා in Sinhala.

It is the first new bird to be discovered in Sri Lanka since 1868, when the Sri Lanka whistling thrush—then Ceylon whistling thrush—(Myophonus blighi) was discovered. It is also the 24th (according to some authorities the 27th) endemic bird species for Sri Lanka.

The habitat of the Serendib scops owl is in the southern rainforests of Sri Lanka. There is an altitudinal range from 30 to 50 metres. This owl has no competition from other nocturnal birds, as the territories are completely different. This species has a very small population: at the end of January 2006 only 80 of them were known to exist. The places that it is expected to be found are in five protected areas, like the Forest Reserve or the Proposed Reserve of Sri Lanka. They seem to be declining because of the loss of habitat and the degradation. The first two hours of darkness are when the owl hunts for its food.

This rare species inhabits the rainforests in the southwestern part of Sri Lanka. Like most owls, it is strictly nocturnal and hunts insects (e.g. beetles and moths) close to the ground. It begins calling at dusk, then its frequency rises again some two hours before dawn.

Unlike the other two species of scops owl in Sri Lanka, Indian scops owl (Otus bakkamoena) and oriental scops owl (Otus sunia), it does not have ear-tufts and its facial disc is only weakly defined. The general colour of this 16.5 cm (6.5 in) long, short-tailed owl is reddish-brown with paler underparts, spotted all over with fine black markings. The irides are tawny yellow (more orangish in male) and the feet are a pale fleshy colour. Tarsi are feathered for less than half their length. The claws and bill are a pale ivory colour.

== Taxonomic status ==
In 2006 and 2007, two papers were published by Sri Lankan ornithologists in the publication Loris questioning whether the Serendib scops owl was a distinct species from other scops owl species found in India, and if so, whether it was actually a new discovery or a rediscovery.

The species has been subsequently recognized as a valid and distinct species by two of the authors who had earlier speculated on its "taxonomic uncertainty" in the papers mentioned above, in their following works.

- Birds of Sri Lanka: A Tally List (2009) by C. D. Kaluthota and S. W. Kotagama.
- An Illustrated Guide to the Birds of Sri Lanka (2010) by S. W. Kotagama and G. Ratnavira.

The question of 'ear-tufts' in this species, which has been misunderstood and led to questioning of its "taxonomic uncertainty" in the papers above, had already been dealt with at length in two articles at:

- http://ceylonbirdclub.org/articles-2006-11.php
- http://orientalbirdclub.org/birdingasia-6/

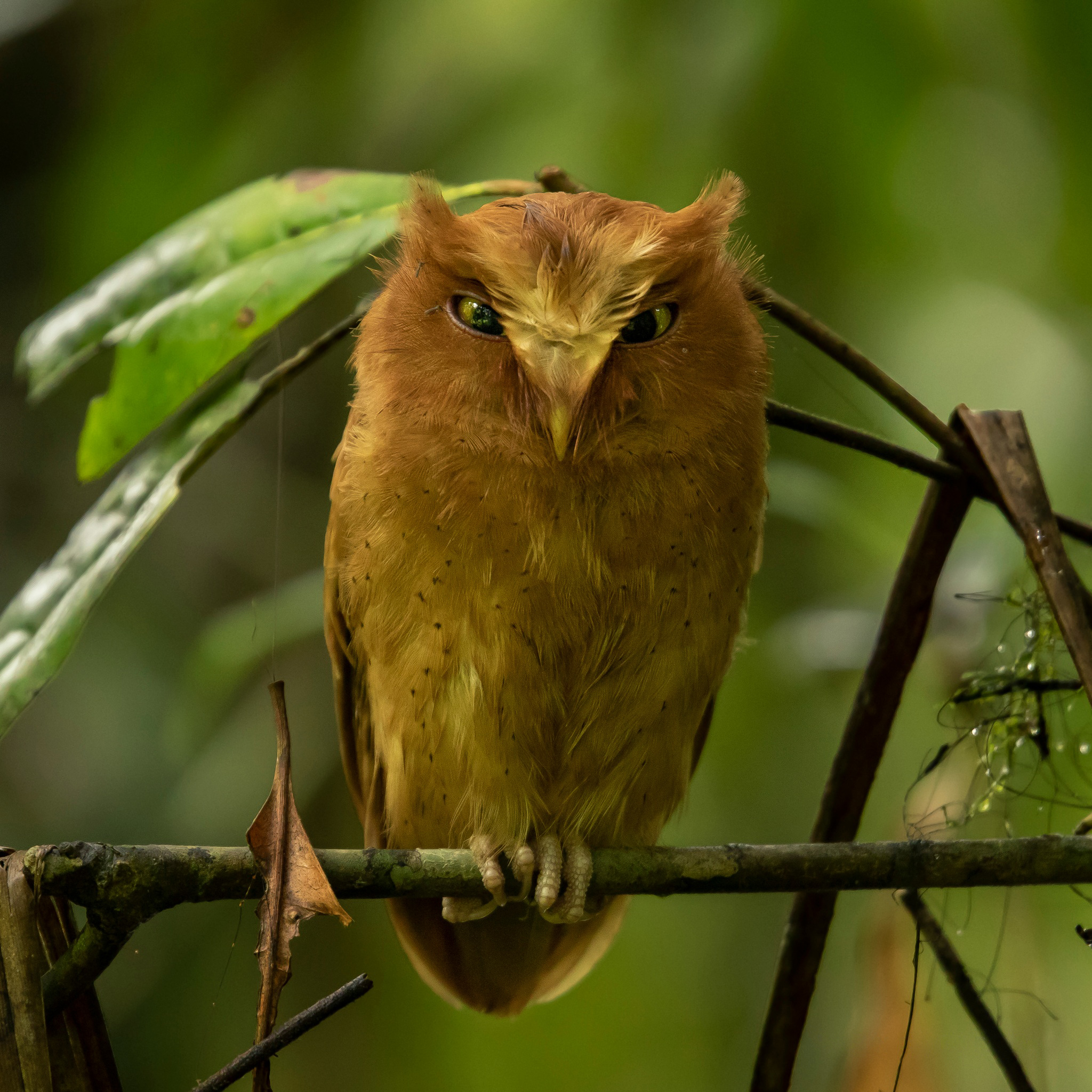
An adult

== In culture ==
This bird appears on the 20 Sri Lankan rupee bank note (2010 series).

== Bibliography ==
Rasmussen, P. & Anderton, J. (2005). Birds of South Asia. The Ripley Guide Lynx Edicions, Barcelona and Washington D.C.
