= Deepal Warakagoda =

Sri Lankan ornithologist

- Born: 1965, Dominion of Ceylon
- Organization(s): Sri Lanka Nature Sounds , Bird and Wildlife Team , Ceylon Bird Club
- Known for: Discovery of Serendib Scops Owl (in 2001), Knowledge of country's bird fauna, Expertise in bird and wildlife tour leading, Sri Lanka Nature Sounds playlist
- Notable work: Helm Field Guides: Birds of Sri Lanka (2012) , Helm Wildlife Guides: Birds of Sri Lanka (2022) , Birds of Sri Lanka - Sounds & Images , Birds of Sri Lanka - Habitat Edition 2017

Deepal Warakagoda is a Sri Lankan ornithologist. His early working career was in electronics, but since his childhood he has studied the island's bird fauna and for many years he has been working as a professional guide for birding and wildlife tours of the island. He is mostly known for his records as one of the few ornithologist who has seen the greatest amount of species in Sri Lanka. Deepal Warakagoda is also one of the major roles of the Ceylon Birds Club . He works with great passion to educate on birdlife in Sri Lanka and its rich diversity of fauna in soundscapes of natural habitats, and their conservation , and has his own career experience for over 30 years .

== Discoveries ==
He discovered a new species of bird endemic to Sri Lanka, the Serendib Scops owl. His expertise in vocalizations had enabled him to realize that an owl he heard calling near Kitulgala rain forest was an unknown species, and he later saw this bird in January 2001 in the Sinharaja rain forest with assistance of a few. He surrounded the bird's habitat and took photographs while it was roosting under a thick bush. This new-found species of scops owl is now on the IUCN Red List. He has also identified (each for the first time) 15 new migrant species of birds in Sri Lanka, and has published a large number of articles on the avifauna of Sri Lanka.

== Creations and experiences ==
Warakagoda is Sri Lanka's foremost sound recordist in natural history subjects, and has produced and published the only comprehensive audio guide to the island's birds (on tape and CD). He has an unmatched knowledge of Sri Lanka's bird songs and calls. His audio recordings of the island's distinct bird species have played a major role in the recognition of several of them as endemic to Sri Lanka in the book Birds of South Asia. The Ripley Guide (2005) by Pamela C. Rasmussen and John C. Anderton.

Although best known for his knowledge of the avifauna of Sri Lanka, and expertise in finding and identifying birds, his keen interest extends to the island's other wildlife too.

Warakagoda founded the Drongo Nature Sounds Library in 1997, the only one of its kind in Sri Lanka, which now holds the largest collection of audio recordings of individual species of fauna and soundscapes of natural habitats of the country. He was joint secretary of the Ceylon Bird Club, and is a national coordinator in Sri Lanka for the Asian Waterbird Census. He is a founder of Bird and Wildlife Team, a company specializing in natural history tours of Sri Lanka and India, and works as one of its senior tour leaders. He is also a leading tour guide of the organization 'Wings birds'

He is currently working on several new publications in the print and audio/video media, for the betterment of education of the country's bird fauna and bird watching in the nature-based tourism industry in Sri Lanka.

== Publications ==
- Helm Wildlife Guides: Birds of Sri Lanka (2022) - by Deepal Warakagoda, Uditha Hettige and Himesha Warakagoda ISBN 978-1-4081-1041-6
- Helm Field Guides: Birds of Sri Lanka (2012) - by Deepal Warakagoda, Carol Inskipp, Tim Inskipp and Richard Grimmet ISBN 978-0-7136-8853-5
- A Guide to the Birds of Sri Lanka Third Edition (1998) - by G. M. Henry, revised and enlarged by Thilo W. Hoffmann, Deepal Warakagoda, and Upali Ekanayake - ISBN 0-19-563813-1
- Photographic Guide to Birds of Sri Lanka (2000) - ISBN 1-85974-511-3
- Sri Lanka Nature Sounds (2011)
- The Bird Sounds of Sri Lanka. An Identification Guide Part 1 (1997, 2nd ed. 2001) audio tape
- The Bird Sounds of Sri Lanka. An Identification Guide Part 2 (1998) audio tape
- The Bird Sounds of Sri Lanka. 99 Species (2003) audio CD
- The Bird Sounds of Sri Lanka. Habitat Edition 2005 (2005) audio tape
- Bird of Sri Lanka, MP3 sound and image collection (2008) CD-ROM – by Deepal Warakagoda and Uditha Hettige.
- Bird Sounds of Sri Lanka, Vocalization and Image Guide (2008) CD-ROM – by Deepal Warakagoda and Uditha Hettige.
- Indian Bird Sounds, The Indian Peninsula (2009) A set of 5 audio CDs – by C. Chappuis, F. Deroussen and D. Warakagoda.
- The Bird Sounds of Sri Lanka. Habitat Edition 2017 (2017) MP3 digital album.
