= Charles Jackson (baseball) =

American baseball player

- Pitcher

Negro league baseball debut
- 1908, for the Minneapolis Keystones

Last appearance
- 1911, for the Kansas City Royal Giants

Teams
- Minneapolis Keystones (1908–1910); Kansas City Royal Giants (1911)

Charles Jackson, nicknamed "Slick" and "Baby", was an American Negro league pitcher between 1908 and 1911.

Jackson played for the Minneapolis Keystones from 1908 to 1910, and finished his career with the Kansas City Royal Giants in 1911. In six recorded career appearances on the mound, he posted a 3.67 ERA over 41.2 innings.
