= To End All Wars =

2001 film directed by David L. Cunningham

- Theatrical release poster
- Directed by: David L. Cunningham
- Written by: Brian Godawa; Ernest Gordon
- Produced by: Jack Hafer; David L. Cunningham
- Starring: Robert Carlyle; Kiefer Sutherland; Ciarán McMenamin; Mark Strong; Sakae Kimura; Masayuki Yui; James Cosmo
- Cinematography: Greg Gardiner
- Edited by: Tim Silano
- Music by: John Cameron; Moya Brennan
- Distributed by: GMT Pictures
- Release dates: September 2001 (Telluride); December 6, 2002 (United States)
- Running time: 125 minutes
- Languages: English; Japanese

To End All Wars is a 2001 war film starring Robert Carlyle, Kiefer Sutherland and Sakae Kimura and was directed by David L. Cunningham. The film is based on Through the Valley of the Kwai, an autobiography of Ernest Gordon, then a Scottish Captain, later the Presbyterian Dean of the Princeton University Chapel.

== Plot ==
The film is set in a Japanese prisoner of war labour camp where the inmates are building the Burma Railway during the last three and a half years of World War II. Captain Ernest Gordon was a company commander with the 2nd Battalion, Argyll and Sutherland Highlanders who fought in several battles in the Malayan Campaign and the Battle of Singapore before being captured and made a prisoner of war by the Japanese.

== Cast ==
- Robert Carlyle as Major Ian Campbell
- Kiefer Sutherland as Lieutenant Jim "Yanker" Reardon, an American Merchant Mariner in Singapore at the time of capture.
- Ciarán McMenamin as Captain Ernest "Ernie" Gordon
- Mark Strong as Dusty Miller
- Sakae Kimura as Sergeant Ito (Japanese: 伊藤軍曹, Itō Gunsō)
- Masayuki Yui as Captain Noguchi (Japanese: 陸軍大尉野口, Rikugun-Tai-i Noguchi)
- James Cosmo as Colonel Stuart McLean
- John Gregg as Dr. Coates
- Shu Nakajima as Nagatomo (Japanese: 長友, Nagatomo)
- Yugo Saso as Takashi Nagase (Japanese: 永瀬隆, Nagase Takashi)
- Pip Torrens as Lieutenant Foxworth
- Adam Sinclair as Jocko
- Winton Nicholson as Duncan
- Brendan Cowell as Private Wallace Hamilton
- Greg Ellis as Sergeant Roger Primrose
- James McCarthy as Norman
- Joji Yoshida as Guard #1
- Daryl Bonilla as POW

== Production ==
It was filmed primarily on the island of Kauai, Hawaii, with some excerpt shots of Thailand. The film was rated R in the U.S. for war violence and brutality, and for some language. The film was produced by Jack Hafer and David Cunningham.

The screenplay is based on the autobiography of Ernest Gordon and recounts the experiences of faith and hope of the interned men. The autobiography was originally published under the name Through the Valley of the Kwai, then later as Miracle on the River Kwai (not to be confused with the separate novel The Bridge over the River Kwai by Pierre Boulle). Gordon's book was finally re-issued with the title To End All Wars to tie in with the film.

Post-production of the film footage was delayed because of lack of funding, which was eventually provided by Goldcrest Films.

== Reception ==
On the review aggregation website Rotten Tomatoes the film has a score of 62% based on reviews from 13 critics, with an average rating of 5.9/10. The film was awarded the Crystal Heart Award and Grand Prize for Dramatic Feature at the Heartland Film Festival. A review in Variety is mainly negative.

== Soundtrack ==
The film's soundtrack was never released as a stand-alone release. Various songs have been re-recorded by Moya Brennan on her subsequent solo albums, most recently 'Mo Mhian' on My Match Is A Makin'.

No.	Title	Writer(s)	Length
1.	"Mo Mhian (Healing Heart)"	Moya Brennan
2.	"I Will Go (Campbell's Theme)"	Moya Brennan
3.	"Lá na Cruinne"	Moya Brennan
4.	"Find The Place"	John Cameron & Moya Brennan
5.	"Amazing Grace"	John Newton / Traditional
6.	"Pomp And Circumstance"	Edward Elgar
7.	"Jesu, Joy of Man's Desiring"	Johann Sebastian Bach
8.	"Yankee Doodle Boy"	George M. Cohan
