= Through the Valley of the Kwai =

Autobiographical work by Ernest Gordon

Through the Valley of the Kwai (also published under the titles Miracle on the River Kwai and To End All Wars) is the autobiography of the Scottish captain Ernest Gordon, and recounts the experiences of faith and hope of the men held in a Japanese prisoner of war labour camp, building the Burma Railway during World War II.

== Dusty Miller ==
Dusty Miller was a British prisoner of war (POW) in Thailand conscripted to work on the Burma Railway during the last three and a half years of World War II. His life and death is attested to in Gordon's book. Miller was a gardener from Newcastle and a Methodist. Like Gordon, he was in the Argyll and Sutherland Highlanders, but was drafted into the Military Police or "Red Caps". He became known to Ernest Gordon during a period early on in their three-and-a-half-year incarceration under the Japanese. Gordon was seriously ill, and was attended to by Miller and "Dinty" Moore, a Roman Catholic POW. In their care, Gordon unexpectedly recovered. Through the examples of Miller and Moore, the recovery of Gordon, and the self-sacrificing examples of numerous others, both faith and hope were restored to many soldiers in the death camps.

=== Death ===
At the war's end, Gordon was the sole survivor of the three. Upon liberation, he sought news of his friends. He found that Miller had been martyred two weeks before the war's end, crucified by a Japanese guard because of his faith.

Near the end of the war, Dinty Moore was being transferred on a Japanese vessel that should have had Red Cross markings because it was a POW ship, not a warship. An Allied submarine sank it, not knowing that it was a POW ship.

== In popular culture ==
The book was also adapted into a film in 2001 under the title To End All Wars.

== See also ==
- The Bridge over the River Kwai, a novel
- The Bridge on the River Kwai, a film
- Silence (Endō novel), a historical novel
