= Charlie Jackson (American football coach) =

American football player and coach (born 1976)

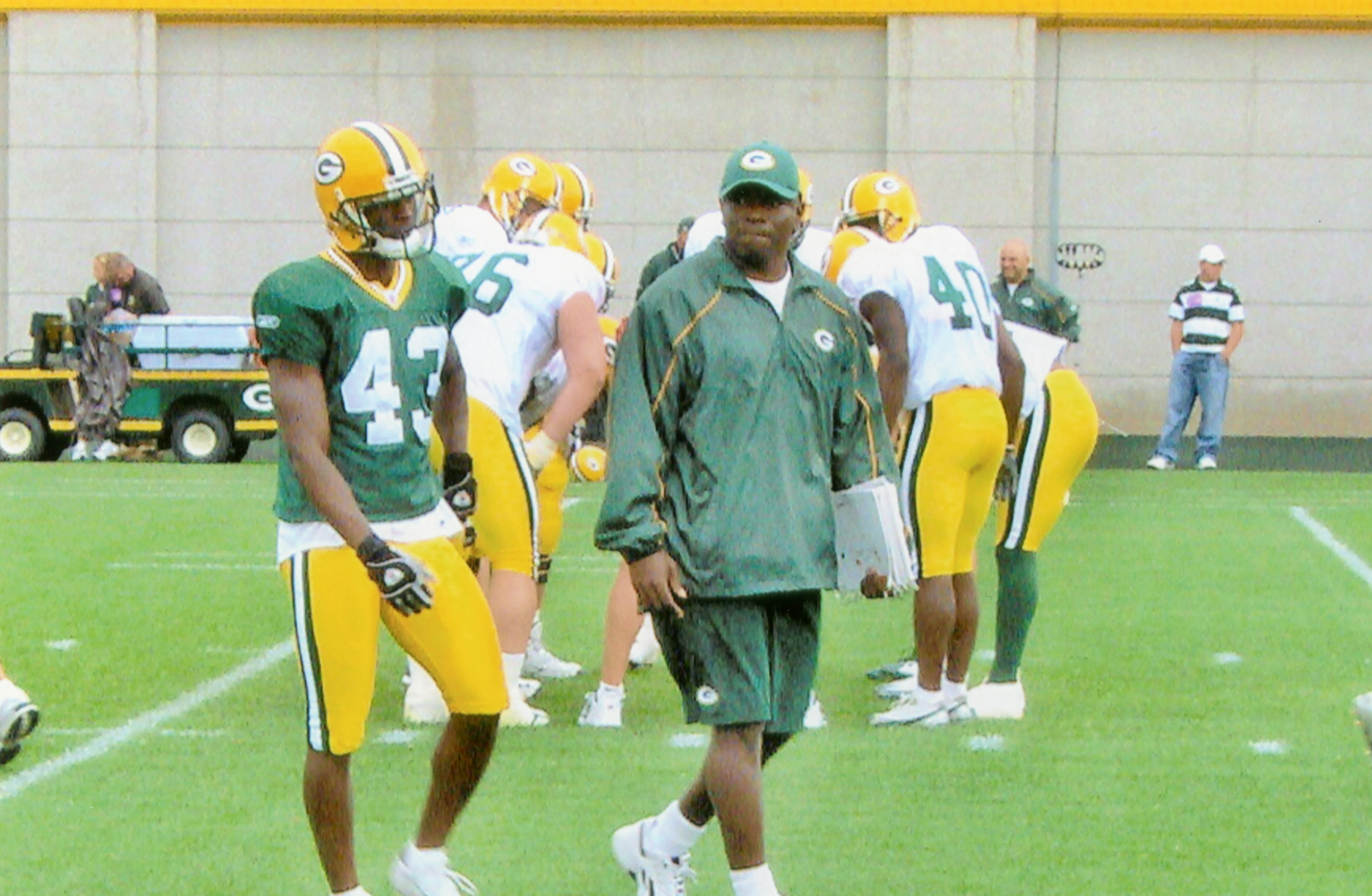
- Jackson with the Green Bay Packers in 2005

Current position
- Title: Assistant head coach, defensive backs coach
- Team: Air Force
- Conference: MW

Biographical details
- Born: November 4, 1976 (age 49); Vienna, Georgia, U.S.

Playing career
- 1995–1999: Air Force
- Position: Safety

Coaching career (HC unless noted)
- 2002–2003: UCLA (volunteer assistant)
- 2004: Air Force (assistant)
- 2005: Green Bay Packers (assistant)
- 2006: Buffalo (assistant)
- 2006: Utah State (special assistant)
- 2007–2009: Denver Broncos (assistant)
- 2012: Colorado (special assistant)
- 2017–2018: Atlanta Falcons (assistant)
- 2019–2021: Kentucky State
- 2022–present: Air Force (AHC/DB)

Administrative career (AD unless noted)
- 2010–2012: Seattle Seahawks (scout)
- 2013–2016: NCAA (CFB executive)

Head coaching record
- Overall: 14–7

Accomplishments and honors

Championships
- 1 SIAC West Division

Charlie Jackson (born November 4, 1976) is an American football coach. He is the assistant head coach and defensive backs coach at the United States Air Force Academy. Jackson served as the head football coach at Kentucky State University from 2019 to 2021.

Jackson was an assistant coach for the Atlanta Falcons of the National Football League (NFL) from 2017 to 2018. He served on the NCAA National Headquarters Enforcement Staff before joining the Falcons. Jackson's background includes multiple defensive coaching roles with the Green Bay Packers and Denver Broncos and coaching fellowships with the Falcons and St. Louis Rams. He also served as a college scout for the Seattle Seahawks. His collegiate experience includes Colorado, UCLA, Utah State, Buffalo, and Air Force.

== Early life ==
Born in Vienna, Georgia, Jackson is a 1995 academic honors graduate of Macon County High School in Montezuma, Georgia. As a football player at Macon County, he was named to the Georgia Academic All-State football team and many on the field accolades, including First Team All-State recognition and Georgia Class-A Football Defensive Player of the Year honors. He was named First Team All-Area by the Americus Times-Recorder, First Team All-Middle Georgia by the Macon Telegraph & News, and First Team All-State by the Atlanta Journal-Constitution and the Georgia Sports Writers Association.

== College ==
Jackson accepted an appointment to the United States Air Force Academy, and he participated in football and indoor track and field as a student-athlete. One of his many football highlights was his sophomore season performance against the United States Naval Academy in 1997. In front of the largest crowd in Navy-Marine Corps Memorial Stadium history, undefeated and #16 ranked Air Force traveled to Annapolis and defeated Navy 10–7. Jackson was named player of the game and subsequently conference player of the week. Following his senior football season, Jackson was selected by his teammates as a permanent team captain and recipient of Air Force football's highest honor, the Brian Bullard Award, as the player who displays unselfishness, pride in his role, total team commitment, and 110 percent effort. Jackson helped Air Force become a consistent member of the Top 25 national rankings, including a Top 10 final ranking and conference championship in 1998.

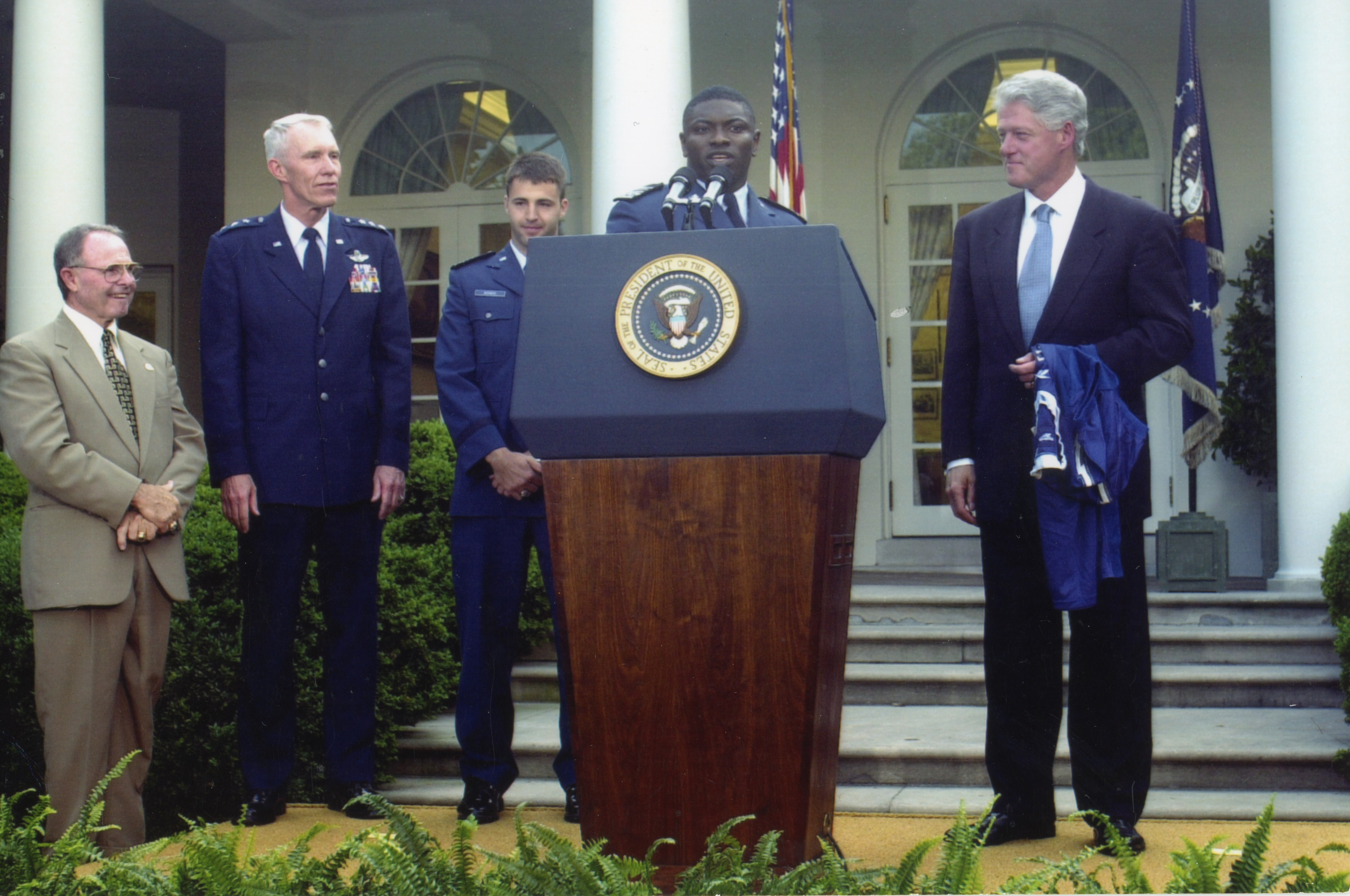
Charlie Jackson giving a White House Rose Garden presentation to United States President, Bill Clinton, on May 9, 2000.

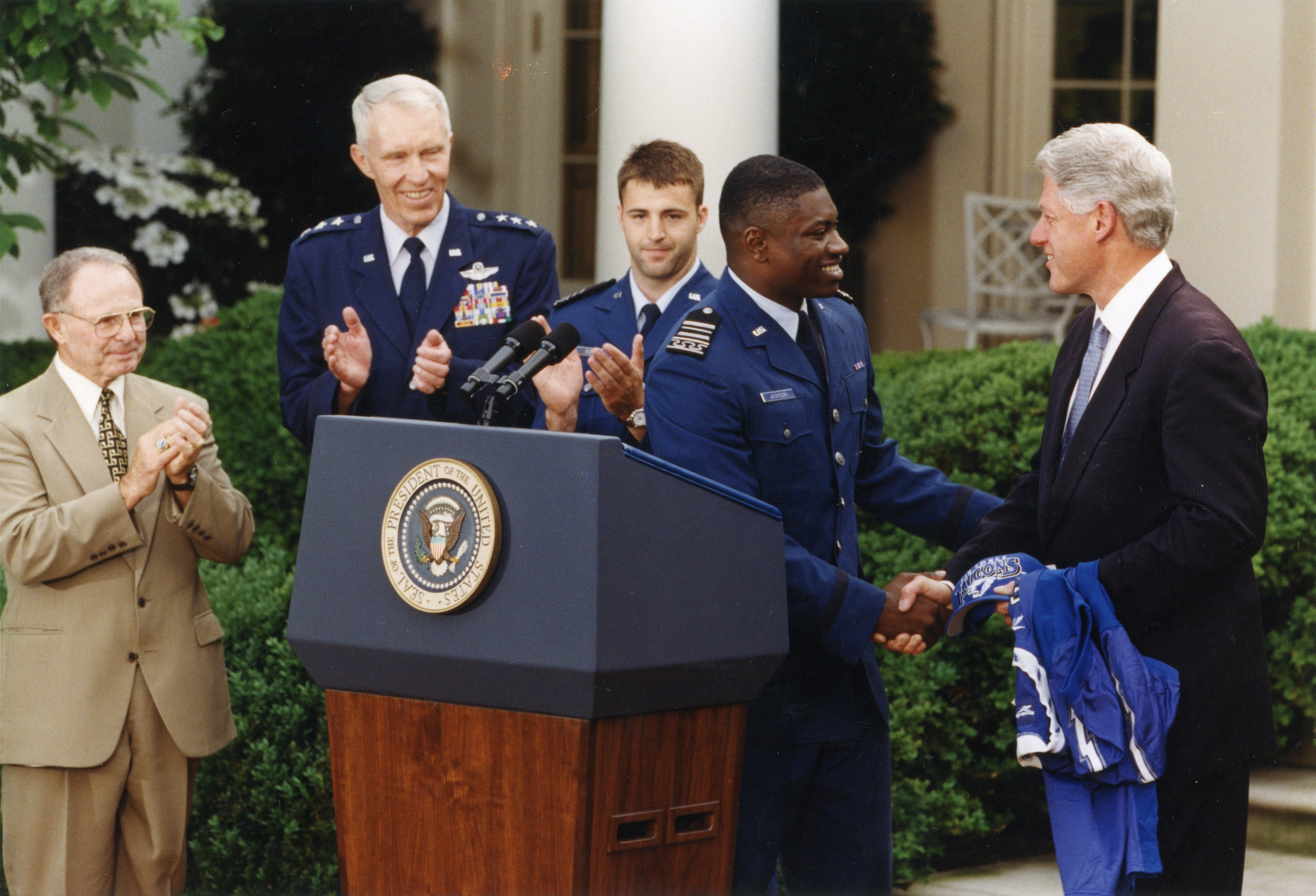
Charlie Jackson seen with President Clinton, College Football Hall of Fame Coach, Fisher DeBerry, Lieutenant General, Tad Oelstrom, and Orthopedic Surgeon, Dr. Cale Bonds.

Jackson earned a bachelor's degree in management from the United States Air Force Academy. He has a master's degree in management and sports studies from California State University, Long Beach.

== Military service ==
Jackson was a Commissioned Officer in the United States Air Force and ascended to the rank of Captain while being stationed more than four years at Tyndall Air Force Base, Florida and Los Angeles Air Force Base, California. His duties included serving as the U.S. Government point man in negotiations with three foreign government agencies in support of international treaty agreements

== Coaching career ==
On February 17, 2017, Jackson was hired as an assistant coach with the Atlanta Falcons of the National Football League (NFL). On February 1, 2019, Jackson was named head football coach at Kentucky State University. He is the winningest (percentage) head football coach at Kentucky State since 1945 (WWII) minimum 20 games. Jackson arrived at Kentucky State with the football program in the midst of a downward spiral that culminated in a 0–10 season in 2018. He took over a program on a 12-game losing streak and a record of 1–16 in the previous 17 games. In his first year leading the program in 2019, the team win total improved by seven games, the highest total win improvement in the country. His team posted victories over multiple Division 1 opponents for the first time in school history, and his team's 70 percent winning percentage (7–3) was the program's best in 41 years. After not competing in 2020 due to COVID-19, the next season produced more winning and the team's 14 win improvement over two seasons ranked #1. Jackson's team set many university records including points in an away game (76), points in a home game (63), total yards in a game (746), rush yards in a game (662), Division 1 victories, and most players with a 3.0 GPA or higher. Jackson is known for his associations with notable turnarounds throughout his coaching career. He helped Air Force to the best defense in school history in 2022. The Air Force defense ranked number one nationally in total defense, number one nationally in least first downs allowed, second nationally in passing defense, third in scoring defense, third in 3rd down conversion defense, and number five in rushing defense. Air Force defensive back, Trey Taylor, was awarded the 2023 Jim Thorpe Award for Best Defensive Back in College Football. With the Atlanta Falcons, the defensive unit ranked NFL Top 10 in scoring defense (eighth) and total defense (ninth) for the first time in 20 years. The Atlanta defensive unit finished fifth in red zone defense and ninth in rushing defense. Atlanta defensive back, Keanu Neal, was selected to his first Pro Bowl, and defensive back, Damontae Kazee, tied for the NFL lead with 7 interceptions. With the Green Bay Packers, the defense ranked seventh in the NFL in total defense and ranked first in passing defense - the organization's best in 27 years. During his time as a college scout with the Seattle Seahawks, the organization drafted future NFL All-Pro players Richard Sherman, Bobby Wagner, and Russell Wilson. Less than one month into his first season at Kentucky State, Jackson had multiple historic victories including the 36th-annual Circle City Classic.

== Professional organizations ==
Jackson is a member of the Fellowship of Christian Athletes (FCA). His professional associations include the American Football Coaches Association (AFCA), NFL Coaches Association (NFLCA), National Association of Collegiate Directors of Athletics (NACDA), National Association of Athletics Compliance (NAAC), Minority Coaches Association of Georgia (MCAofGA), and the National Association of Collegiate Women Athletics Administrators (NACWAA).

== Head coaching record ==
Year	Team	Overall	Conference	Standing	Bowl/playoffs
Kentucky State Thorobreds (Southern Intercollegiate Athletic Conference) (2019–2021)
2019	Kentucky State	7–3	3–3	3rd (West)	
2020–21	No team—COVID-19				
2021	Kentucky State	7–4	4–2	T–1st (West)	
Kentucky State:		14–7	7–5		
Total:		14–7			
National championship Conference title Conference division title or championship game berth
