= Ernest Gordon =

Scottish clergy (1916-2002)

- Born: 31 May 1916; Greenock, Scotland
- Died: 16 January 2002 (aged 85)
- Occupation: Presbyterian dean of the chapel at Princeton University
- Known for: Through the Valley of the Kwai
- Parents: James Gordon (father); Sarah R MacMillan (mother)
- Military career
- Allegiance: United Kingdom
- Branch: British Army
- Service years: 1939–1945
- Commands: Argyll and Sutherland Highlanders, 2nd Battalion
- Conflicts: World War II; Malayan Campaign; Battle of Singapore

Ernest Gordon (31 May 1916 – 16 January 2002) was the former Presbyterian dean of the chapel at Princeton University. A native of Greenock, Scotland, and the son of James Gordon and Sarah R MacMillan, as an officer in the Argyll and Sutherland Highlanders, Gordon spent three years in a Japanese prisoner of war (POW) camp during the Second World War. He chronicled his experiences on the Death Railway in his book Through the Valley of the Kwai. The book served as an inspiration to the film To End All Wars, where he was portrayed by actor Ciarán McMenamin. The film opened in 2001, and the film's DVD release, which came out after his death, dedicated the film to his memory.

== Wartime Service ==
Captain Ernest Gordon was a company commander with the 2nd Battalion, Argyll and Sutherland Highlanders. He fought in several battles in the Malayan Campaign and the Battle of Singapore. He was one of the last Allied soldiers to cross the causeway from Johore before it was blown up. After the capture of Singapore, he escaped to Java, and attempted to sail several thousand miles from Padang to Sri Lanka with a group of other British officers in a native fishing boat. His boat was captured by some Japanese warships, and he was returned to Singapore as a prisoner of war.

== Internment ==
Gordon found his sense of self and spirituality while a prisoner and one of the participant soldiers who helped build The Bridge on the River Kwai. The Japanese were especially cruel to their prisoners. The death rate was quite high. He underwent very torturous events, that led to his being placed in the "Death Ward" designated for those who were not expected to survive. (These conditions included malnutrition, beriberi, malaria, tropical ulcer, and an appendectomy.)

He was treated there by two soldiers in their late twenties, a Methodist named "Dusty Miller", a simple gardener from Newcastle upon Tyne; and "Dinty" Moore, a devout Roman Catholic. The two gave 24-hour care to Gordon. They boiled rags, cleaned and massaged Gordon's diseased legs every day. Against expectations Gordon survived, and as a consequence many of the POWs experienced a revival of faith and hope for life. Gordon, an agnostic, was impressed by Dusty's simplicity and firm Christian faith in the face of the severe treatment the prisoners received at the hands of their captors. Dusty was one who did not lose faith and never met the cruel treatment he received with anger.

Gordon survived the war. Upon liberation as he sought news of his friends he found that two weeks before the war's end Dusty had been crucified by a Japanese guard who was frustrated with Dusty's sense of calm in the face of hardship. Dinty, whom Gordon cared for and admired profoundly, died when the Allies sank his unmarked prisoner transport ship.

== Post war ==
Gordon returned home to Scotland to pursue the vocation he had found in the camp. He was ordained a minister of the Church of Scotland at Paisley Abbey in 1950. After moving to the United States, he preached at churches in Amagansett and Montauk, Long Island. Gordon came to Princeton University in Princeton, N.J., as Presbyterian chaplain in 1954 and was named dean of the chapel the following year.

== Bibliography ==
- Through the Valley of the Kwai (1962)
- Miracle on the River Kwai (1963)
- Solan (1973)
- To End All Wars (2002)

== See also ==
- Silence (Endō novel)
