= NFL Coaches Association =

Group of coaches of the National Football League

The National Football League Coaches Association (NFLCA) is a group of coaches in the National Football League (NFL).

During the 2011 NFL Lockout, the NFLCA filed a brief in favor of the players. One major element of NFL coaches' contracts, negotiated between individual coaches and NFL teams/owners, are provisions that authorize the employing NFL teams to withhold part of a coach's salary when league operations are suspended, such as lockouts or television contract negotiations.

== See also ==
- American Football Coaches Association
- National Basketball Coaches Association
