= Charles R. Jackson (USMC) =

American Marine

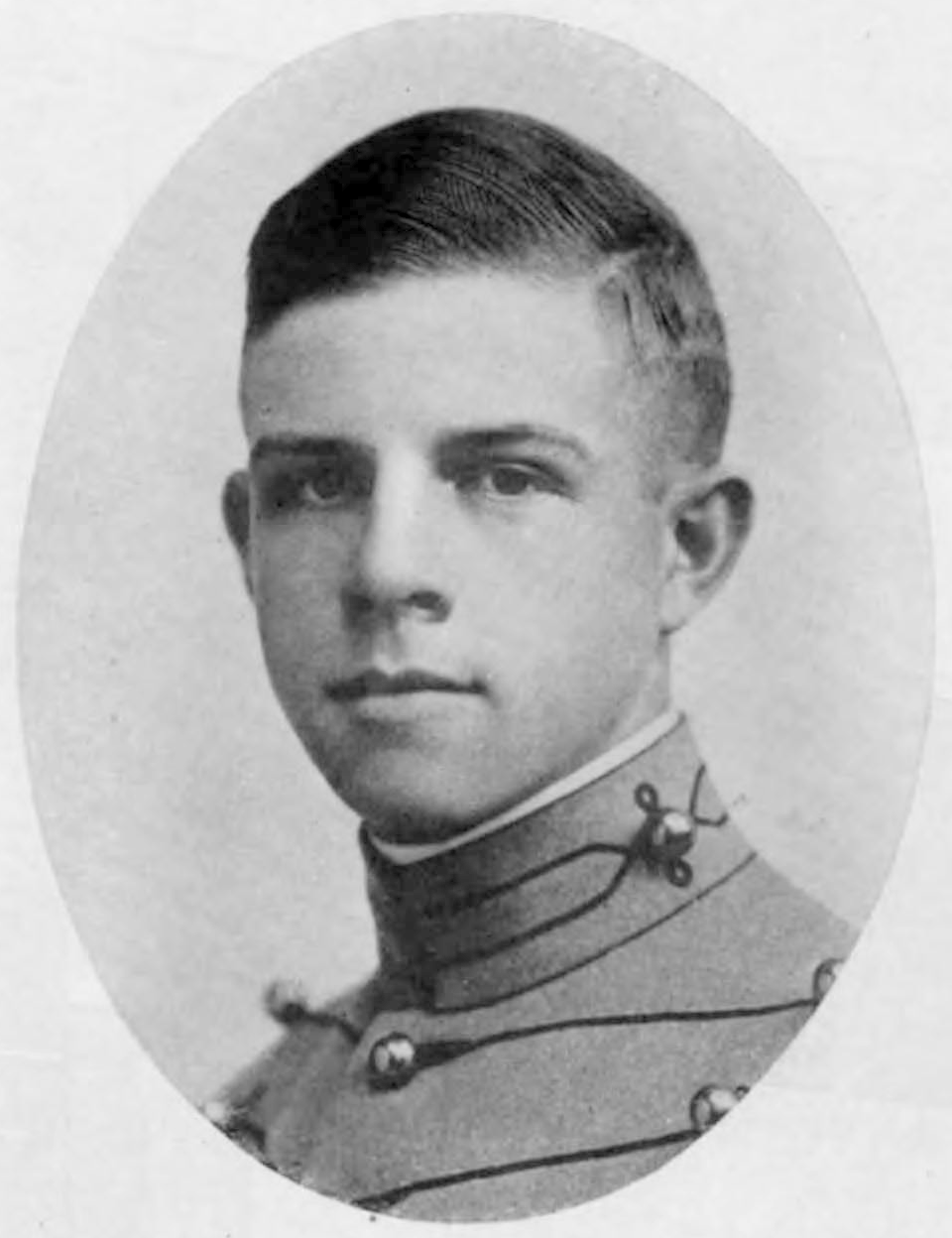
- As a West Point cadet
- Born: July 14, 1898; Petersburg, Virginia
- Died: May 4, 1971 (aged 72); San Diego, California
- Occupation: United States Marine
- Spouse: Margaret MacRae (m. 1949)
- Writing career
- Genre: memoir

Personal details
- Awards: Silver Star; Purple Heart

Military service
- Allegiance: United States of America
- Branch/service: United States Army; United States Marine Corps
- Years of service: 1919–1925; 1927–1951
- Rank: Sergeant major
- Battles/wars: World War II

Charles Ream Jackson (1898–1971) was an American Marine, best known for his posthumously published memoir I Am Alive: A United States Marine's Story of Survival in a World War II Japanese POW Camp.

== Biography ==
Charles R. Jackson was born in Petersburg, Virginia, on July 14, 1898. He attended Virginia Military Institute, where he earned a degree in civil engineering. From there he attended West Point and graduated in 1919. He then served in the United States Army, resigning his commission in 1925 to join the United States Marine Corps, where he enrolled in 1927 as a private.

While fighting in the Battle of Corregidor in the spring of 1942, he was captured by the Japanese and interned as a POW for three years.

After the war, he was appointed a commissioned warrant officer in the Marine Corps. He married Margaret MacRae on April 7, 1949.

He retired on November 1, 1951, due to eye problems caused by vitamin deficiencies he experienced as a prisoner of war.

He died in San Diego, California, on May 4, 1971.

== Ranks ==
- Private
- Sergeant major

== Military medals and ribbons ==
Silver Star
Purple Heart

== Writings ==
Charles R. Jackson's plain account of his experiences as a P.O.W. of the Japanese was edited by military historian Major Bruce Norton USMC (Ret.) and published posthumously in June 2003. Among other topics from Jackson's notes that were assembled were accounts of inhumanity and deadly situations, including forced marches.

== Sources ==
- Jackson, Charles; Bruce H. Norton (2003). I Am Alive!: A United States Marine's Story of Survival in a World war II Japanese POW Camp. Presidio Press. ISBN 0-345-44911-8.
- Morris, Eric (2000). Corregidor: The American Alamo of World War II. Cooper Square Press. ISBN 0-8154-1085-9.
