= Metropolitan Waterworks Authority =

Thai state enterprise

Metropolitan Waterworks Authority (MWA)
- Logo depicts Phra Mae Thorani
- Native name: การประปานครหลวง
- Romanized name: kan prapa nakhon luang
- Formerly: Bangkok Waterworks
- Company type: State enterprise
- Industry: Municipal water supply
- Predecessor: Sanitary Department
- Founded: 16 August 1967; 58 years ago
- Headquarters: Lak Si District, Bangkok, Thailand
- Area served: Bangkok Metropolitan
- Key people: Chaiwat Chuenkosum (chairman); Manit Panaim (governor)
- Products: Potable water
- Production output: 1,997 million m^{3} (2018)
- Revenue: 19,203 million baht (2018)
- Net income: 7,519 million baht (2018)
- Total assets: 75,100 million baht (2018)
- Number of employees: 5,365 (2018)
- Parent: Ministry of Interior
- Website: Official website

The Metropolitan Waterworks Authority (Abrv: MWA; Thai: การประปานครหลวง, RTGS: kan prapa nakhon luang) is a Thai state enterprise under the Ministry of Interior. Its mission is to produce, distribute, and sell treated water in Bangkok, Nonthaburi, and Samut Prakan, and engage in related businesses synergistic with waterworks.

The MWA began operations on 16 August 1967 under the Metropolitan Waterworks Authority Act B.E. 2510 (1967) to serve potable water to Bangkok, Nonthaburi Province, and Samut Prakan Province.

== History ==
In the reign of King Rama V, when Bangkok had a population of roughly 333,000, the king, returning from his first visit to Europe in 1897, ordered the establishment of a Sanitary Department to provide water to the Bangkok populace. Many still used water from rivers or canals, frequently the source of epidemics. The new department made a survey and dug up a distributary canal of the Chao Phraya River at Sam Lae Sub-district in Pathum Thani Province to the north of Bangkok. Water was drawn though this canal into Bangkok to supply cleaner water.

In 1907, the king made a second visit to Europe. He found that most European countries produced clean, adequate water for their people. Returning to Thailand, he ordered the hiring of French experts to conduct a survey and make suggestions on water procurement for Bangkok. On 13 July 1909, the king decreed that the government would provide a modern water supply system for the people of Thailand. He ordered the Sanitary Department to dig and construct canals and install water pumps in order to deliver water to water treatment plants in the Sam Sen Sub-district. Pipes were installed underground to distribute water throughout the Bangkok area, at a cost of over four million baht and five years of construction. The king called the result "Bangkok Waterworks". The first water treatment plant was set up in 1914.

Demand for water in Bangkok increased rapidly, from 10,000 to 13,000 metres^{3} per day, most of which was consumed at numerous public water spigots. People in the suburbs of Bangkok, with no water supply, carried pots to take water from them, especially in the summer, when the waterworks increased production to full capacity of 28,800 m^{3} per day, sufficient for the population at the time. The government's emphasis on improving water supplies in Bangkok led to the merging of the Nonthaburi municipality water supply, Samut Prakan's water supply, and Thonburi's water supply with those of Bangkok Waterworks. A new organization called the "Metropolitan Waterworks Authority", a public enterprise under the Interior Ministry, began operations on 16 August 1967.

== Operations ==
The MWA draws raw water from two sources: the Chao Phraya River at Ban Krachaeng Sub-district, Mueang Pathum Thani District, Pathum Thani Province and from the Mae Klong Dam in Tha Muang District, Kanchanaburi Province. The water is treated with lime, chlorine, alum, and polyelectrolyte at four water treatment plants—Bang Khen, Sam Sen, Thonburi, and Maha Sawat. MWA's treated water is distributed to its 2,375,490 customers in five regional service areas via 37,700 km of water pipes. The 2018 average tariff for residential customers was 9.99 baht per cubic metre. Total consumption in FY2018 was 1,401.4 million m^{3}. At the end of September 2018, the MWA employed 5,365 persons.

== Water tariffs ==
Charges for MWA water for residential users range from 8.50-14.45 baht per m^{3} depending on usage. These rates have evidently been unchanged since December 1999. MWA does not add waste water charges to water supply bills, despite clear evidence from international experience that this is best practice. Critics claim this exacerbates Thailand's water pollution problems for want of adequate funding.

== Financials ==
MWA's fiscal year (FY) runs from 1 October to 30 September. In FY2018 (1 October 2017 – 30 September 2018) MWA reported total assets of 75,100 million baht, revenues of 19,203 million baht, and a net profit of 7,519 million baht.

== Issues ==
- Source water salinity: Thailand's frequent droughts cause the water level of the Chao Phraya River, one of MWA's two raw water sources, to plunge. At high tide in the Gulf of Thailand salt water intrudes up the river, causing an increase in salinity. As of 2020, salinity levels have been within acceptable limits, but MWA has advised vulnerable customers to monitor or restrict their intake of salt.

== See also ==
- Provincial Waterworks Authority
- Metropolitan Electricity Authority
