= Mae Klong Dam =

Dam in Kanchanaburi, Thailand

Coordinates: 13°57′17″N 99°37′30″E

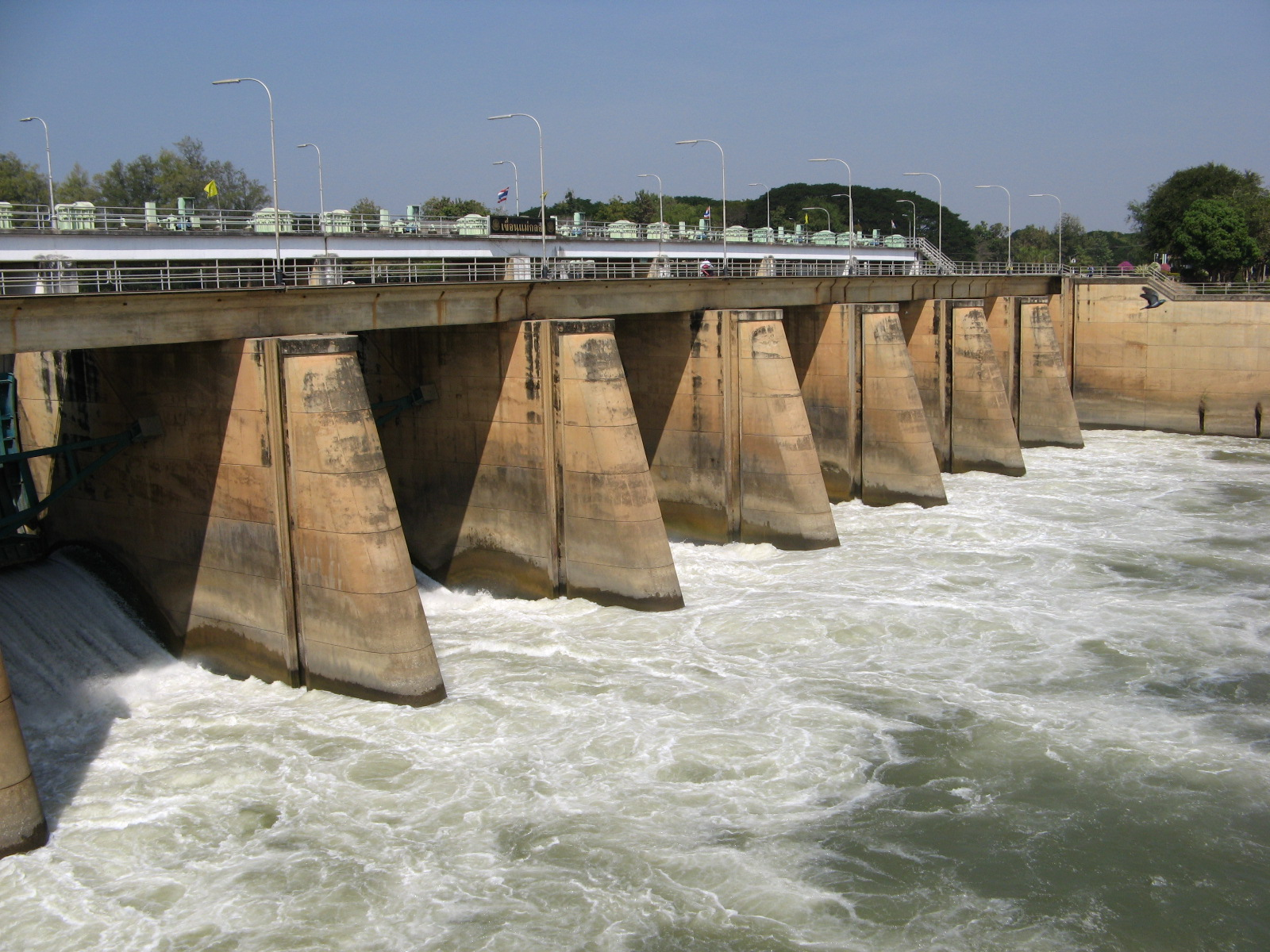
The barrage gates

The Mae Klong Dam (Thai: เขื่อนแม่กลอง) is a barrage dam on the Mae Klong River in western Thailand's Kanchanaburi Province. Situated in Tha Muang District, shortly downstream of the provincial capital of Kanchanaburi, it was built as part of the Greater Mae Klong Irrigation Project and was completed in 1970.

The barrage is a steel-reinforced concrete structure, 150 metres long and 14 metres high, with eight 12.5-by-7.5-metre radial gates. It regulates the flow of the river, while a network of irrigation canals provides water for agriculture over an area of 2,621,000 rai (4,194 km^{2}; 1,619 sq mi) in six provinces, diverts water to the Tha Chin River, and supplies water for the Metropolitan Waterworks Authority's Maha Sawat Water Treatment Plant, which provides the Thonburi (western) side of Bangkok with running water. A small hydroelectric power plant with two 6-megawatt generators was built in 2006. The dam is jointly operated by the Royal Irrigation Department and the Electricity Generating Authority of Thailand.

Mae Klong Dam produced 33.32 GWh in 2014. The targeted annual supply was set at 74 GWh, and experiments have demonstrated that the dam is capable of producing up to 124.39 GWh.
