= Phra Mae Thorani =

Mother Earth (goddess) of Buddhist mythology

Translations of Vasundharā
- Pali: Vasundharā
- Burmese: Wathondare (ဝသုန္ဓရေ); Wathondara (ဝသုန္ဓရာ)
- Khmer: Neang Konghing (នាងគង្ហីង); Preah Thoroni (ព្រះធរណី); Preah Mae Thoroni (ព្រះម៉ែធរណី)
- Thai: Vasundharā (พระศรีวสุนธรา); Phra Mae Thorani (พระแม่ธรณี); Nang Thorani (นางธรณี)

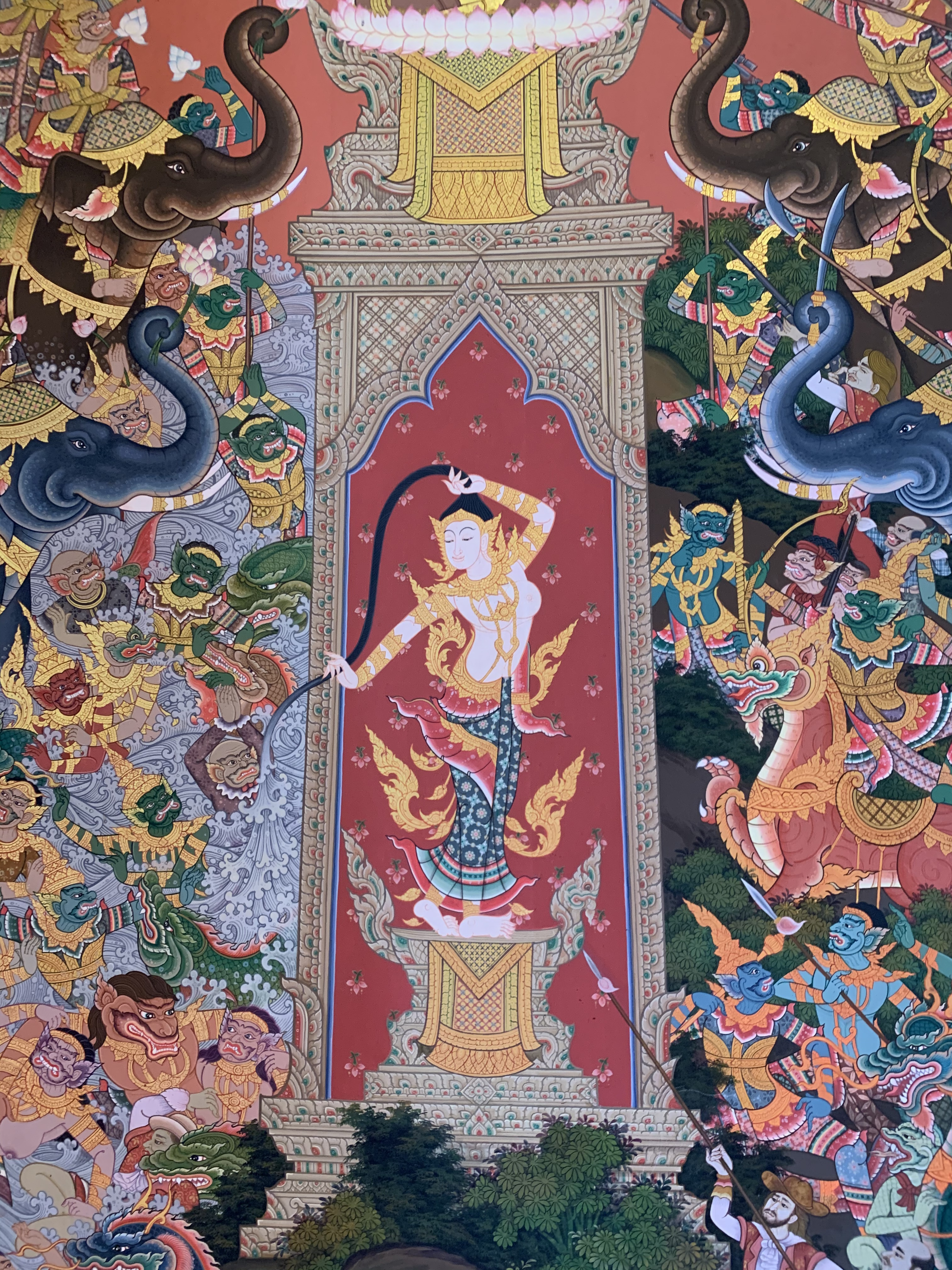
Dharanī squeezing her hair aiding the Gautama Buddha to subdue māra, a mural at Wat Hong Rattanaram, Bangkok

Vasundharā or Dharaṇī is a chthonic goddess from Buddhist mythology of Theravada in Southeast Asia. Similar earth deities include Pṛthivī, Kṣiti, and Dharaṇī, Vasudhara bodhisattva in Vajrayana and Bhoomi devi and Prithvi in Hinduism.

== Etymology ==
She is known by various names throughout Southeast Asia. In Khmer, she is known by her title Neang Konghing (នាងគង្ហីង, lit. "lady princess"), or as Preah Thoroni (ព្រះធរណី) or Preah Mae Thoroni (ព្រះម៉ែធរណី; "Mother Earth Goddess"). In Burmese, she is known as Wathondare (ဝသုန္ဓရေ) or Wathondara (ဝသုန္ဓရာ) (from Pali: vasundharā, lit. 'earth') and variously transliterated as Wathundari, Wathundaye, Vasundari, etc. In Thai and other Tai languages, she is known as Thorani (from Pali: dhāraṇī, lit. 'ground, earth"') in various appellations, including Nang Thorani (นางธรณี), Mae Thorani (แม่ธรณี), and Phra Mae Thorani (พระแม่ธรณี).

== Iconography and symbology ==
Various depictions across the Suvarnabhumi
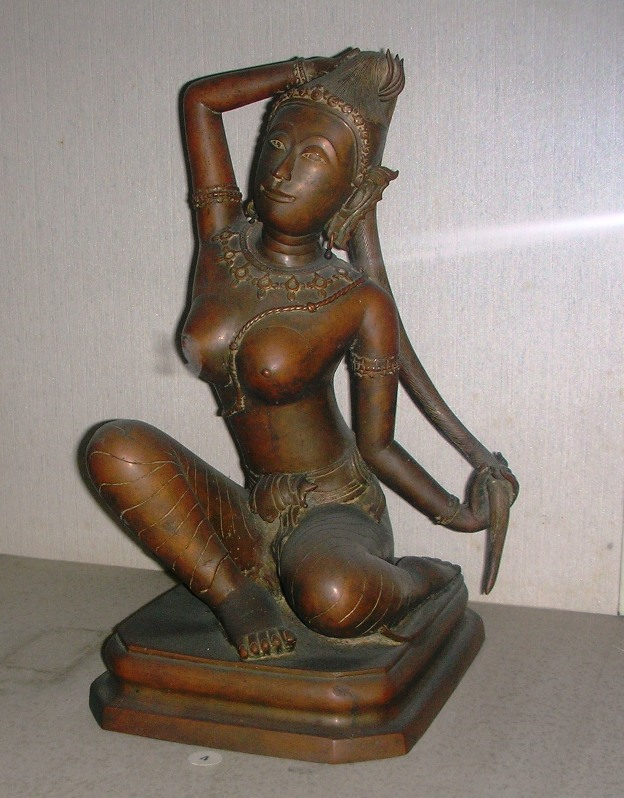
at Bangkok National Museum

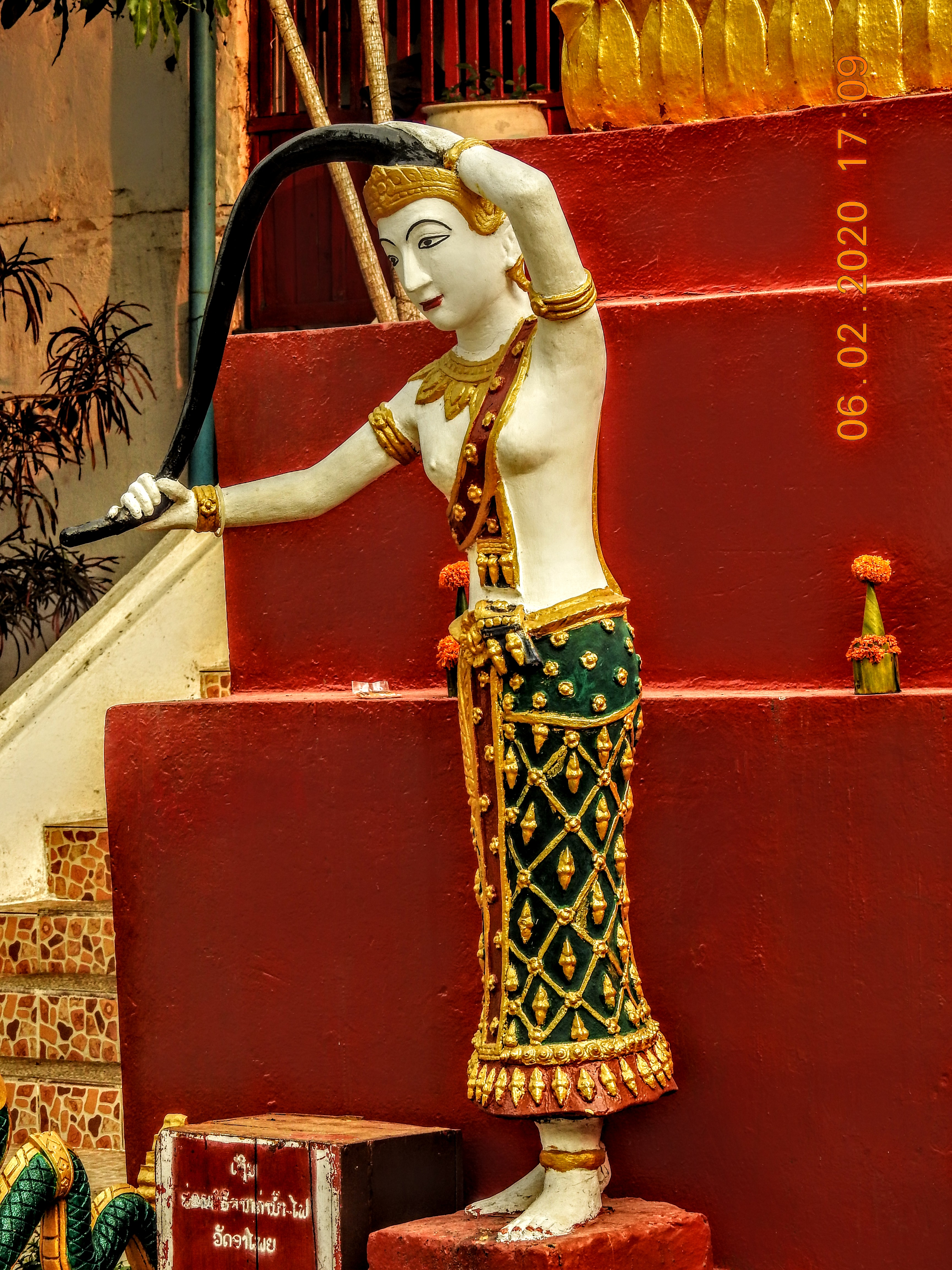
Lao art

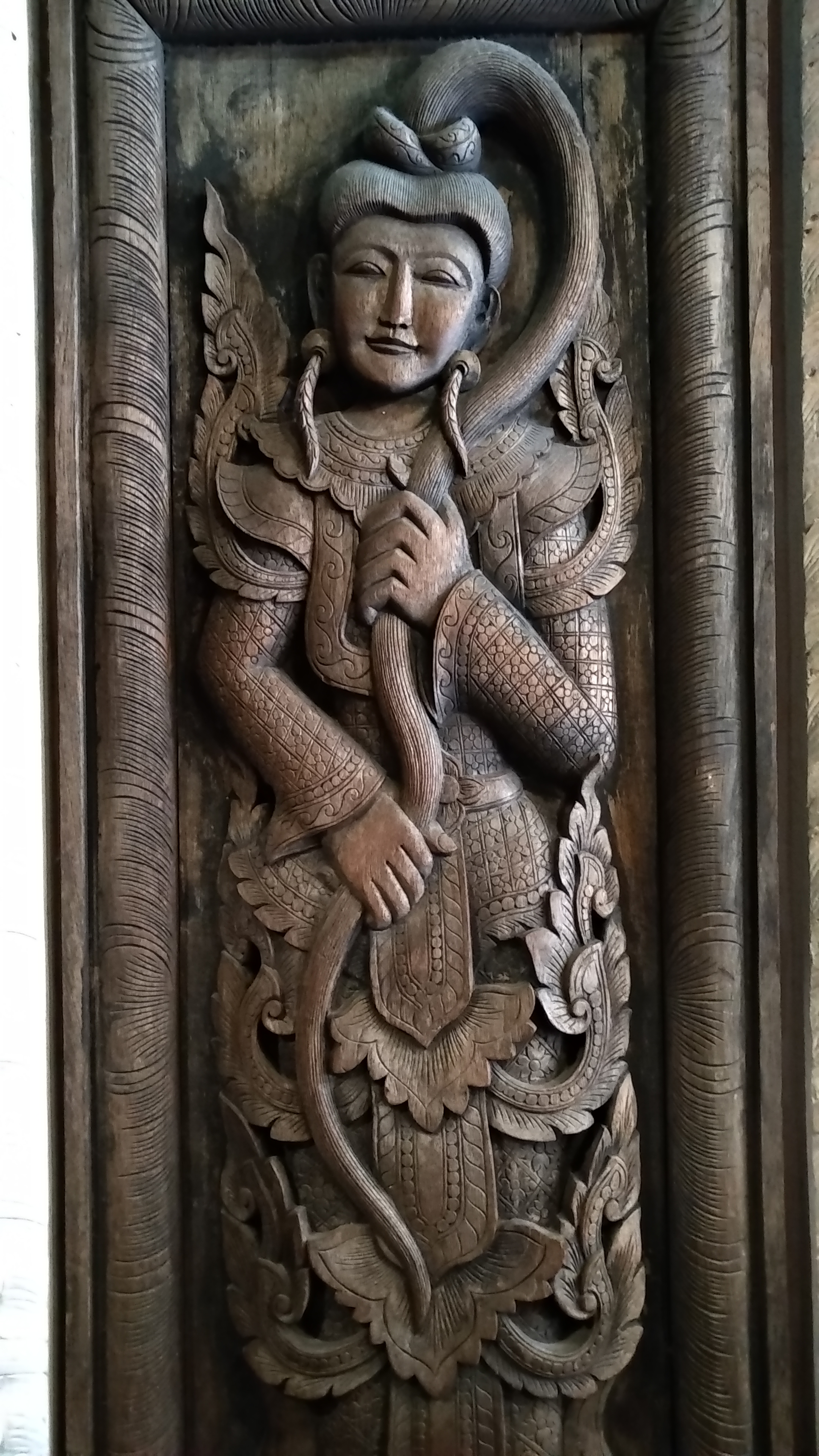
in Art of Myanmar

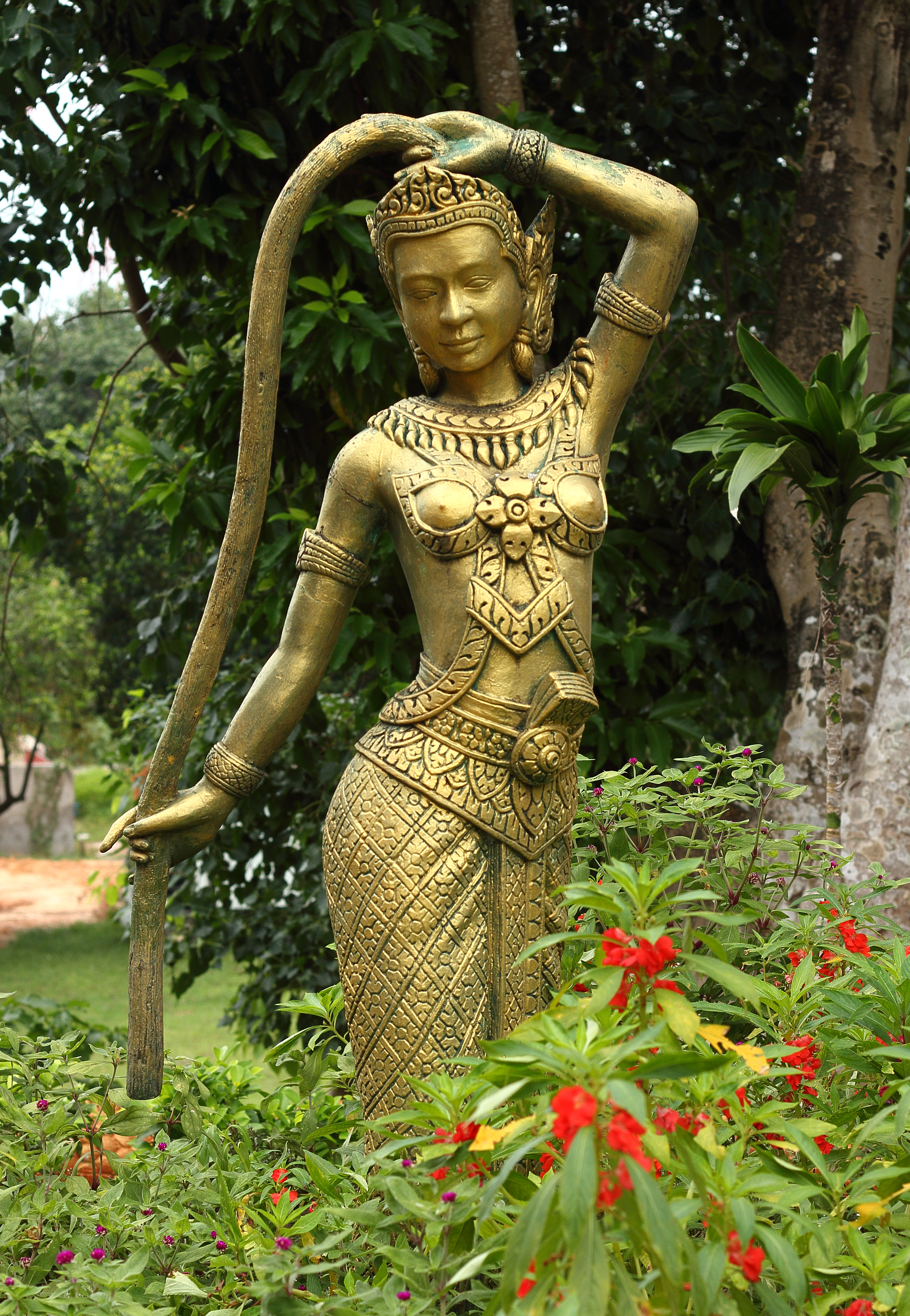
"Preah Thorani" in Cambodia.

Images of Preah Thorani are common in shrines and Buddhist temples of Burma, Cambodia, Thailand and Laos. According to Buddhist myths, Phra Mae Thorani is personified as a young woman wringing the cool waters of detachment out of her hair to drown Mara, the demon sent to tempt Gautama Buddha as he meditated under the Bodhi Tree.

The Bodhisattva was sitting in meditation on his throne under the Bodhi Tree, Mara, the Evil One, was jealous and wanted to stop him from reaching enlightenment. Accompanied by his warriors, wild animals and his daughters, the personifications of desire, he tried to drive the Bodhisattva from his throne. All the gods were terrified and ran away, leaving the Bodhisattva alone to face Mara's challenge. The Bodhisattva stretched down his right hand and touched the earth, summoning her to be his witness. The earth deity in the form of a beautiful woman rose up from underneath the throne, and affirmed the Bodhisattva's right to occupy the vajrisana. She twisted her long hair, and torrents of water collected there from the innumerable donative libations of the Buddha over the ages created a flood. The flood washed away Mara and his army, and the Bodhisattva was freed to reach enlightenment.

— A Study of the History and Cult of the Buddhist Earth Deity in Mainland Southeast Asia

In Buddhism, most predominantly in the Pali Canon (but stretches throughout all schools and sects), Vasundhara (in the Pali Language) is categorized as a "Bhummatthika Devata" meaning "Earth Dwelling Deva". and in a modern sense, like other non-heavenly Devas, she is categorized as a Bhuta, a general Buddhist term for a coarse, primal, or non-heavenly Deva.

In temple murals, Phra Mae Thorani is often depicted with the Buddha in the mudra known as calling the earth to witness. The waters flowing forth from her long hair wash away the armies of Mara and symbolize the water of the bodhisattva's perfection of generosity (dāna paramī).

== Calling the earth to witness ==
In the iconography of Gautama Buddha in Laos and Thailand, "touching the earth" mudra (Maravijaya Attitude) refers to the Buddha's pointing towards the earth to summon the Earth Goddess to come to his assistance in obtaining enlightenment by witnessing to his past good deeds.

== Buddhist water libation ==
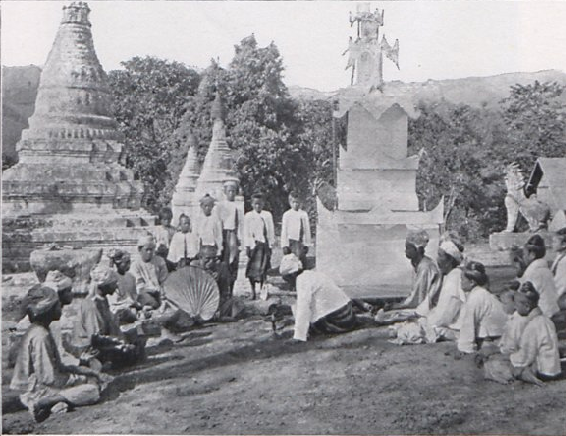
Photograph of a libation ceremony in 1900.

In Buddhism in Burma, the water ceremony (yay zet cha), which involves the ceremonial pouring of water from a glass into a vase, drop by drop, concludes most Buddhist ceremonies including donation celebrations and feasts. This ceremonial libation is done to share the accrued merit with all other living beings in all 31 planes of existence. While the water is poured, a confession of faith, called the hsu taung imaya dhammanu, is recited and led by the monks. Then, the merit is distributed by the donors, called ahmya wei, by saying Ahmya ahmya ahmya yu daw mu gya ba gon law three times, with the audience responding thadu, Pali for "well done." The earth goddess, known in Burmese as Wathondara (ဝသုန္ဒရာ) or Wathondare (ဝသုန္ဒရေ), is invoked to witness these meritorious deeds. Afterward, the libated water is poured on soil outside, to return the water to the goddess.

== Modern use as a symbol ==
Phra Mae Thorani is featured in the logo of:

- The Metropolitan Waterworks Authority and Provincial Waterworks Authority of Thailand.
- The Democrat Party (Thailand) to emphasise the importance of earth and water for Thailand, together with the Pali proverb sachamwe amatta wacha (สจฺจํเว อมตา วาจา) "truth is indeed the undying word," to symbolise the values of the Party.

== Gallery ==
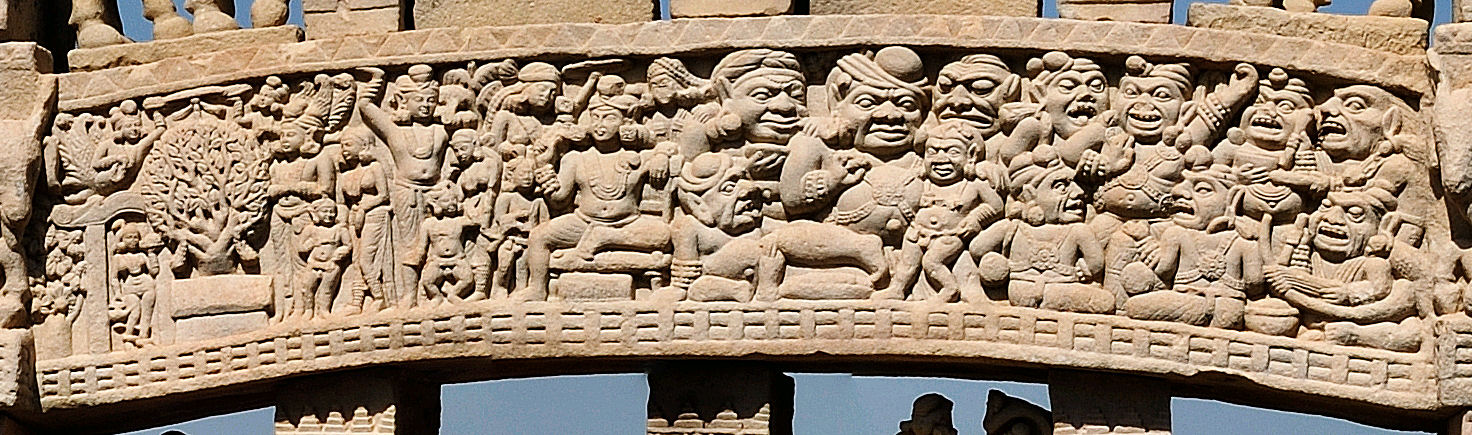
Buddha during the battle with Mara, pointing towards the earth, summoning Phra Mae Thorani to come to his assistance from Sanchi. She is on the left hand and holding Kalasha.

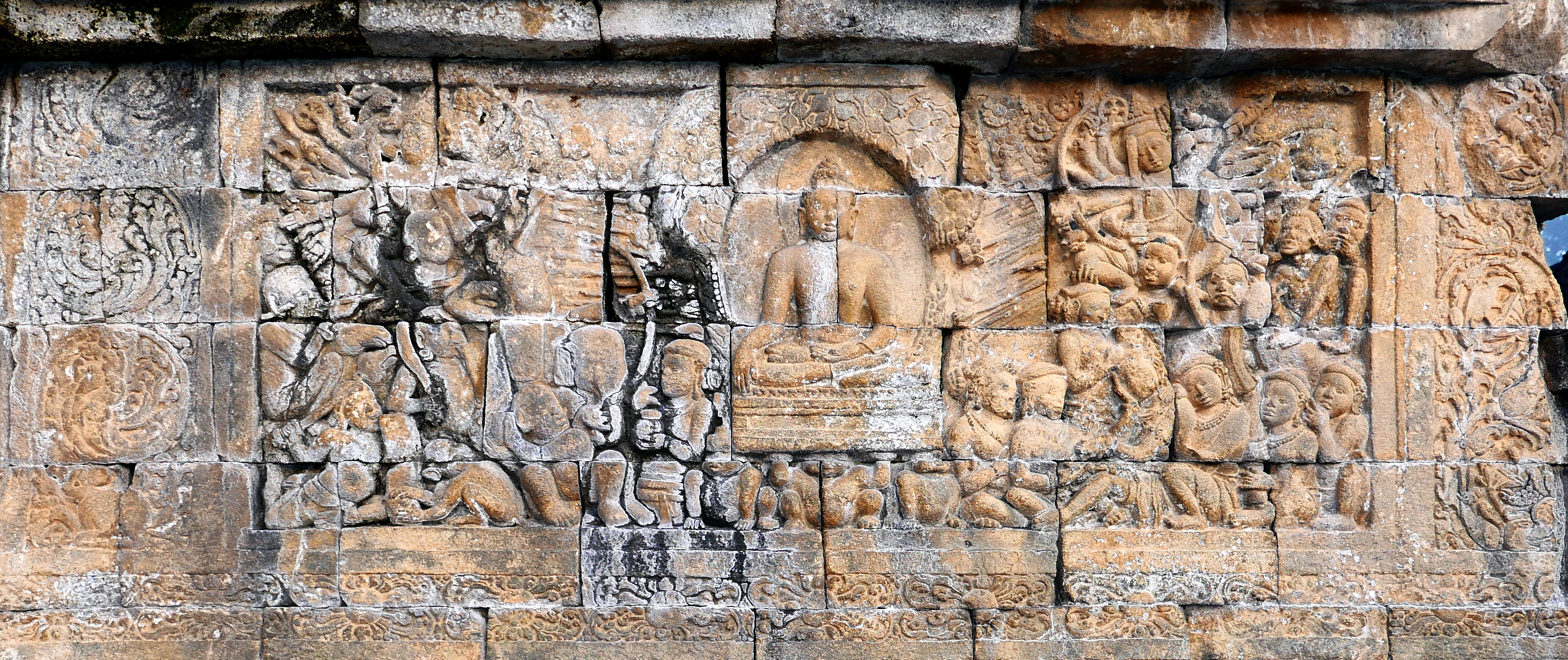
Buddha during the battle with Mara pointing towards the earth, summoning Phra Mae Thorani to come to his assistance from Borobudur. She is on the left hand and holding Kalasha.

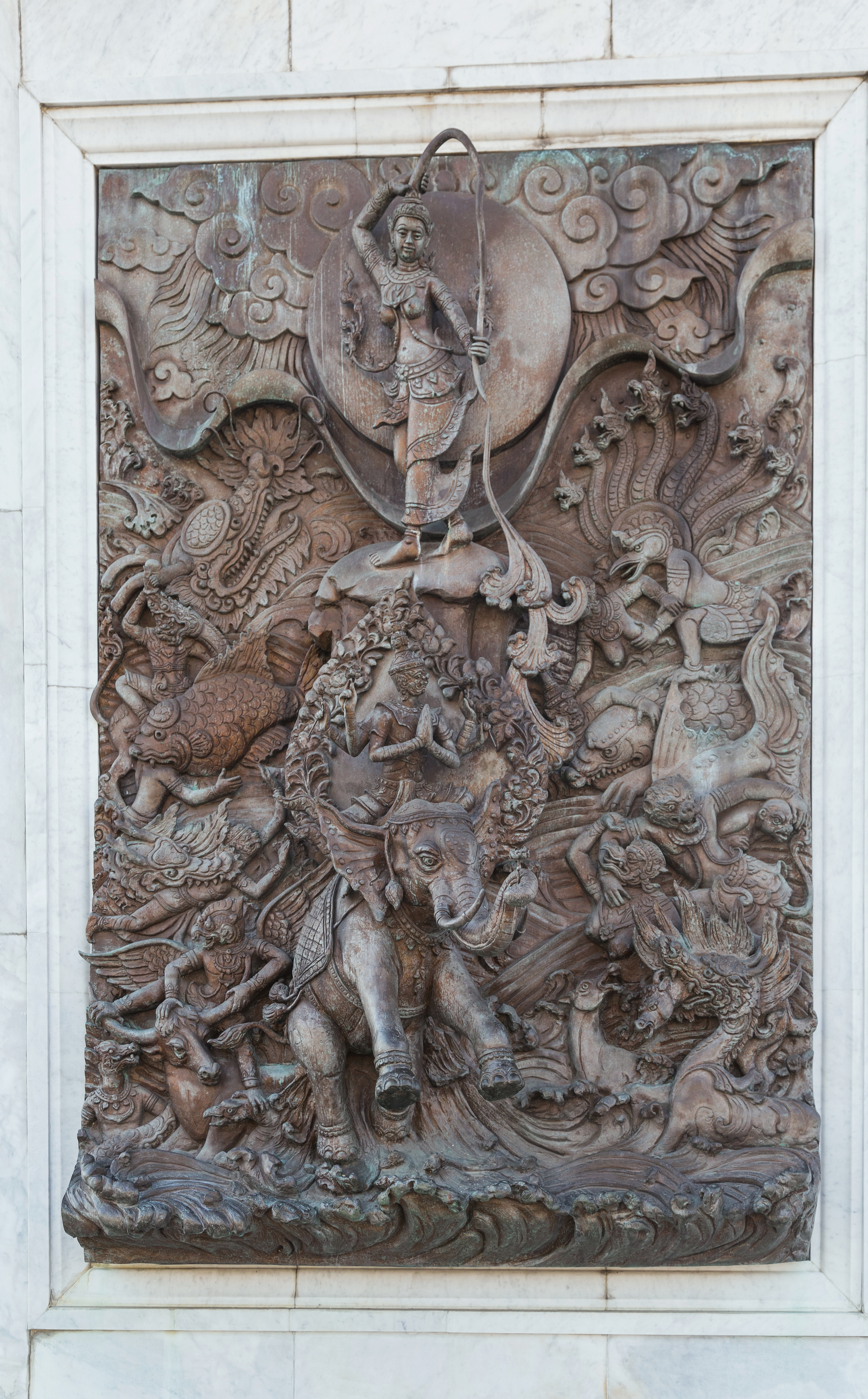
Buddha during the battle with Mara pointing towards the earth, summoning Phra Mae Thorani to come to his assistance in Wat Traimit

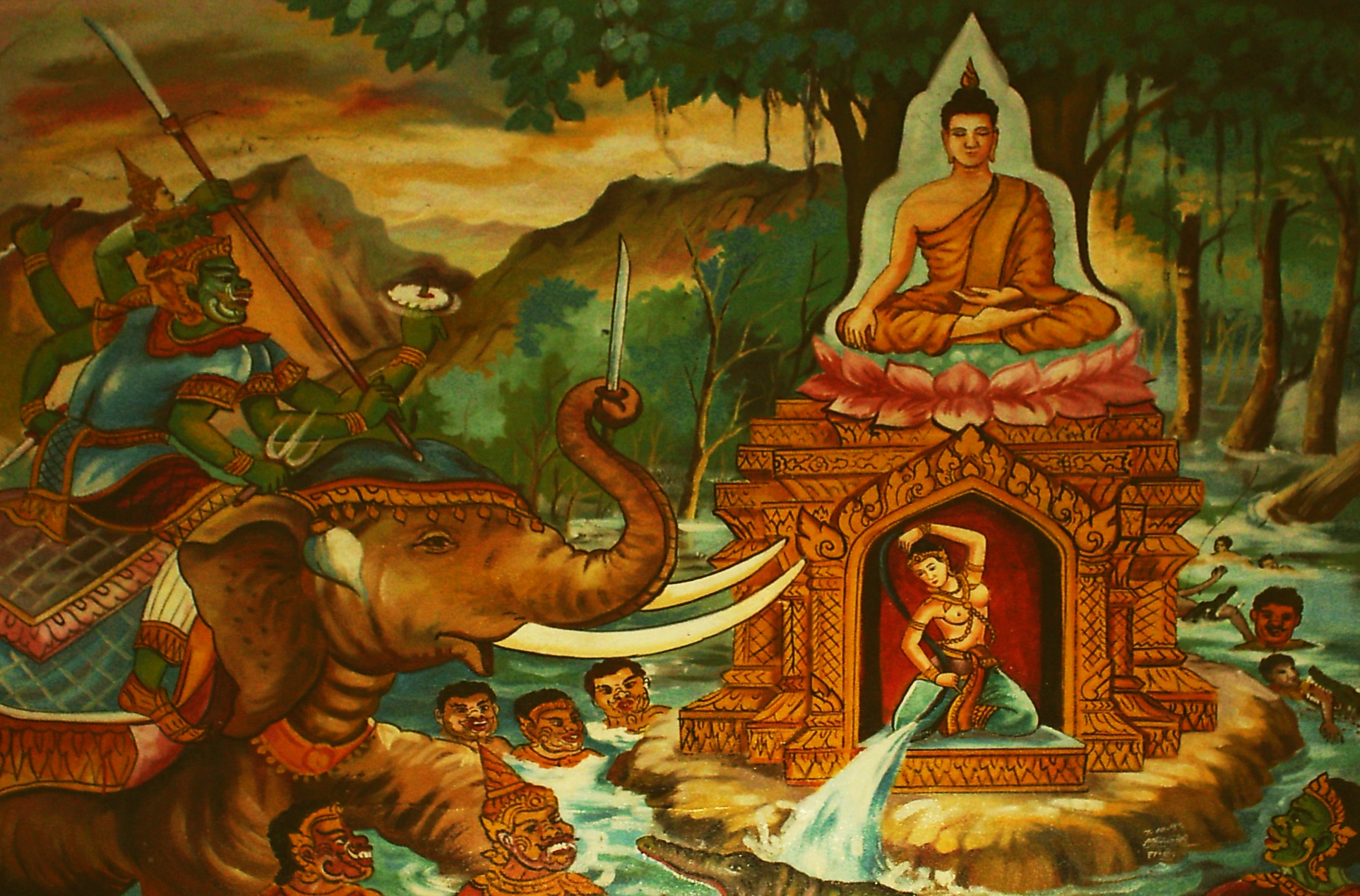
Painting in a Laotian wat. Buddha during the battle with Mara pointing towards the earth, summoning Phra Mae Thorani to come to his assistance

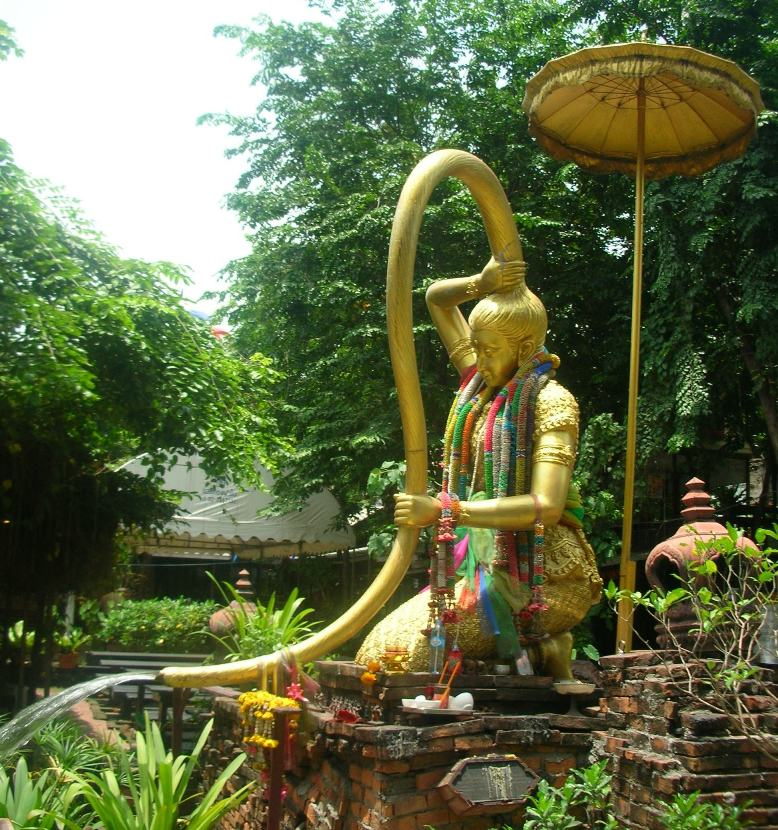
Phra Mae Thorani fountain, Bangkok

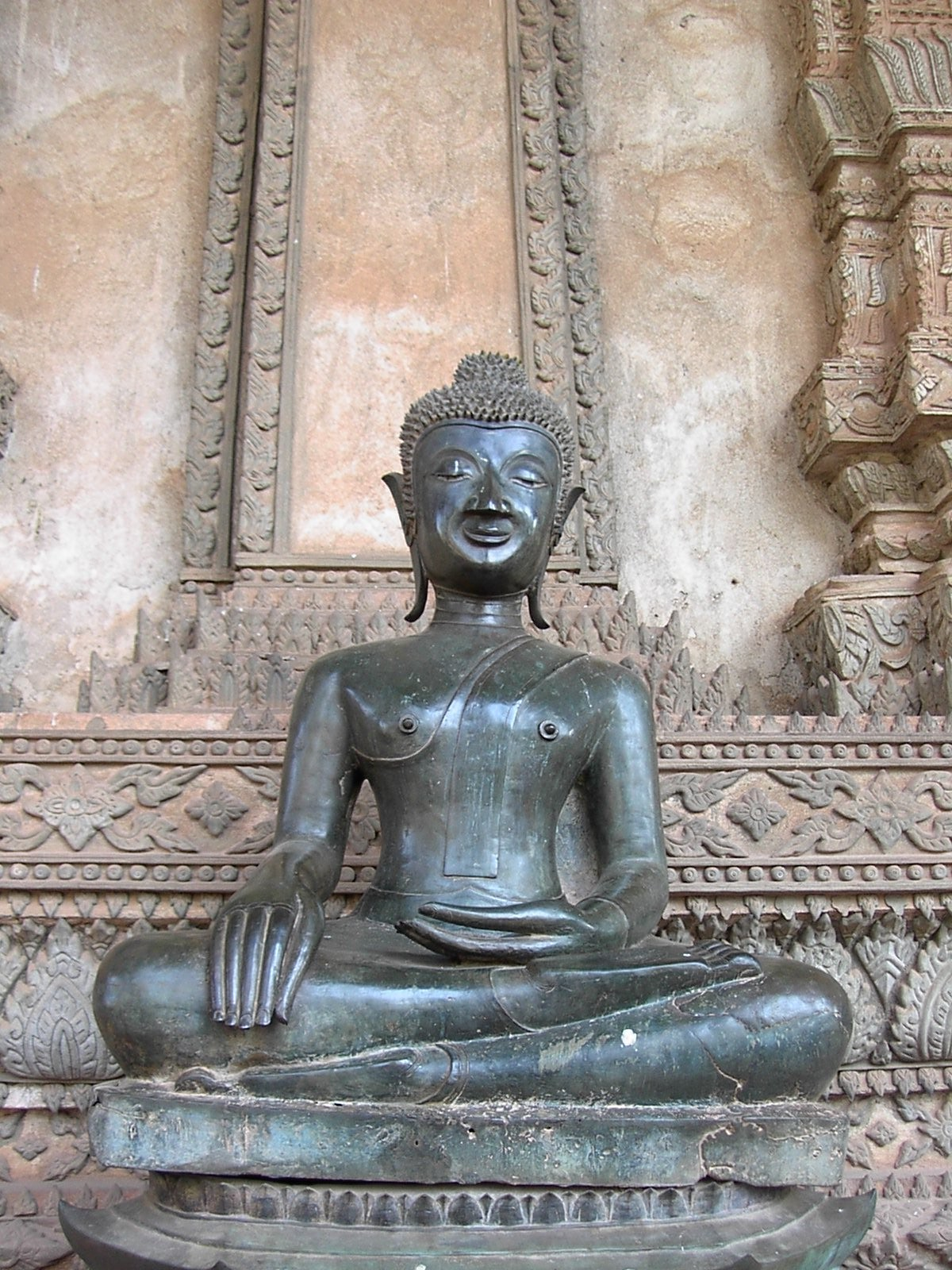
Calling the earth to witness

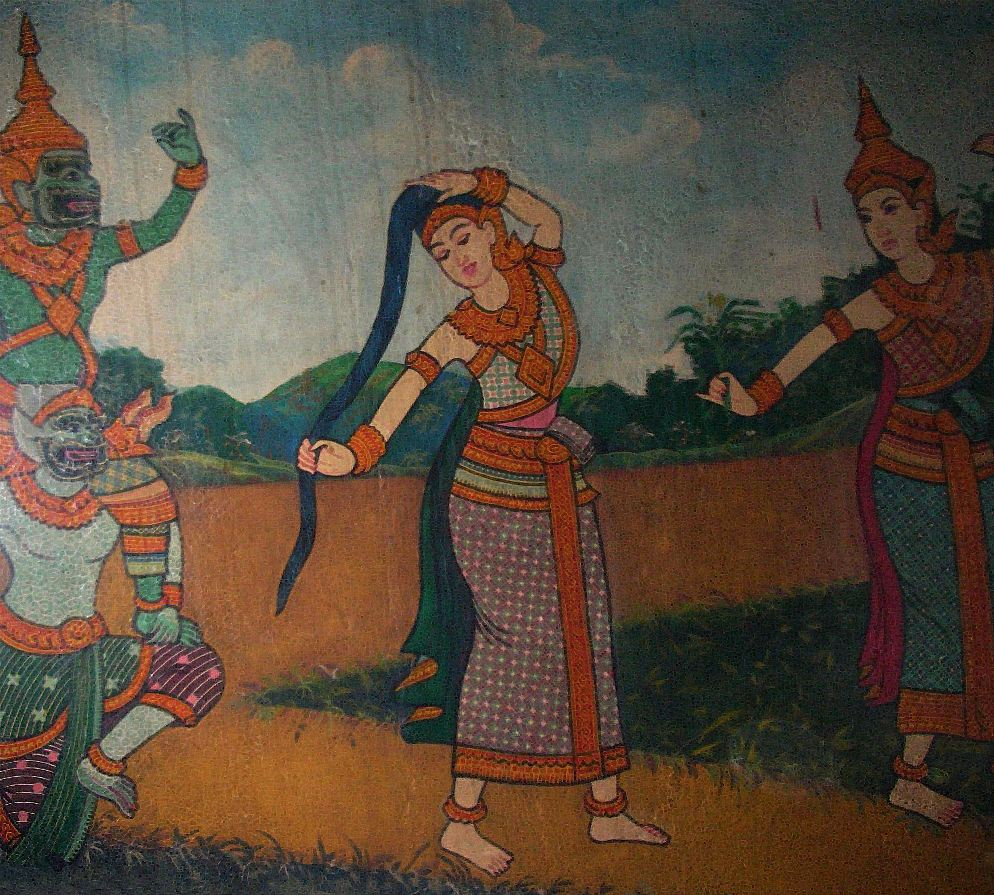
Wat Phnom Mural: Preah Thorani placing herself between the demons and Gautama Buddha

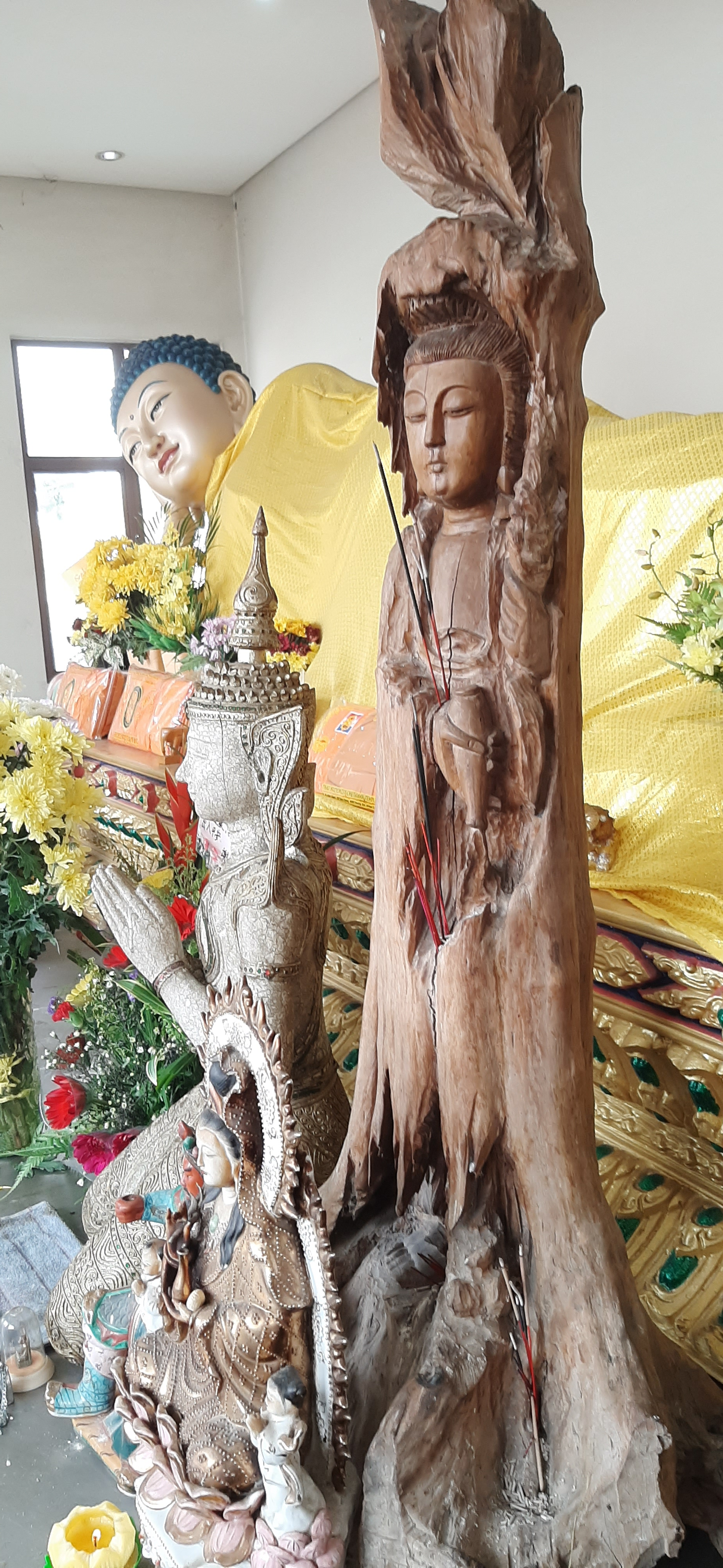
Wooden statue of Phra Mae Thorani in Wat Chetawan, Malaysia

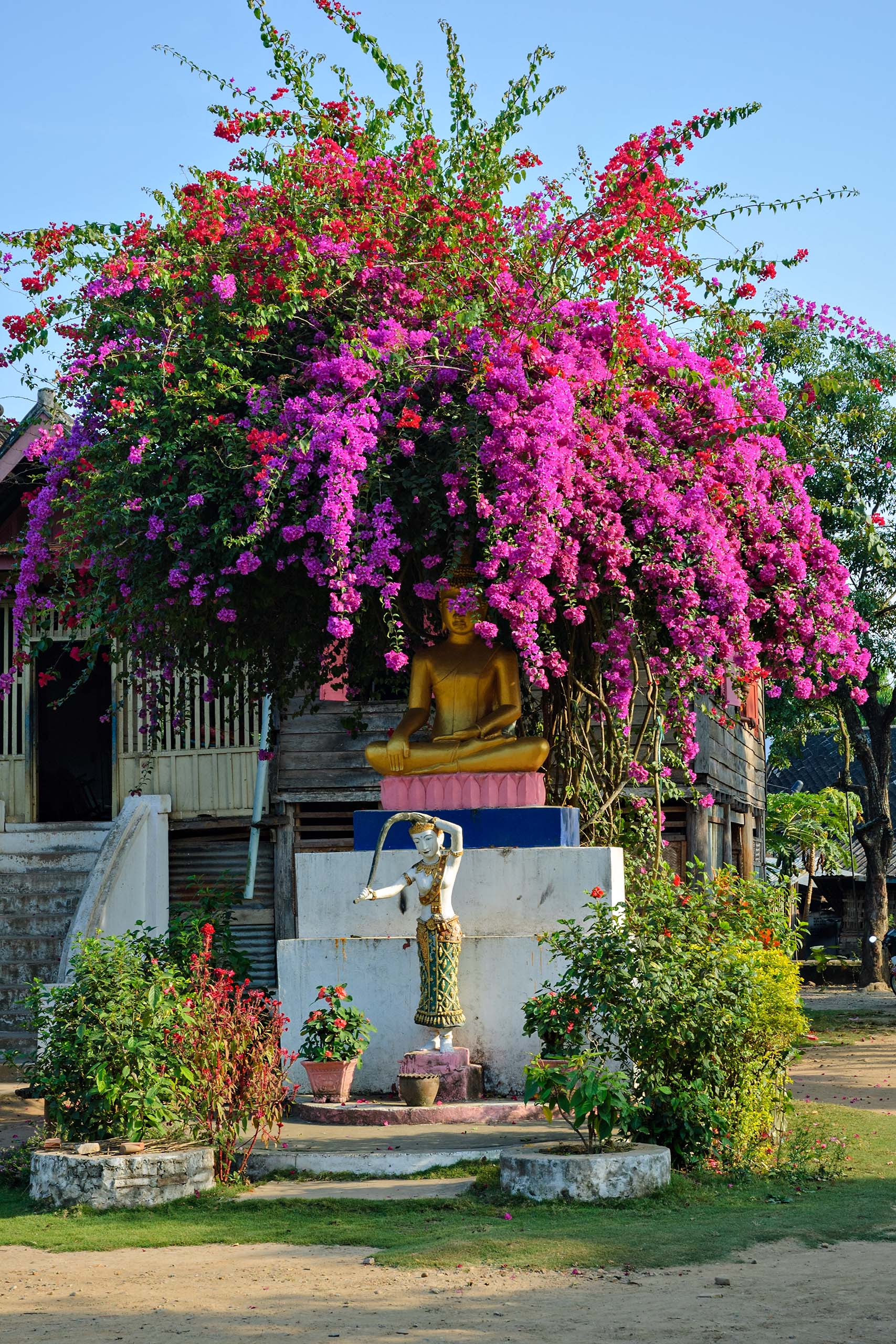
Phra Mae Thorani earth goddess under lilac bougainvillea tree, Luang Prabang, Laos

== See also ==
- Maravijaya attitude
- Mother goddess
- Houtu
- Vasudhara
- Phosop
- Bhūmi
