= Provincial Waterworks Authority =

State enterprise in Thailand

Provincial Waterworks Authority (PWA)
- Logo depicts Phra Mae Thorani and a map of Thailand in the background
- Native name: การประปาส่วนภูมิภาค
- Romanized name: kan prapa suan phumi phak
- Company type: State enterprise
- Industry: Provincial water supplies
- Predecessors: Department of Public Works; Department of Health
- Founded: 28 February 1979; 47 years ago in Bangkok, Thailand
- Headquarters: Bangkok, Thailand
- Number of locations: 10 regional offices, 233 waterworks (2014)
- Area served: 74 Thai provinces
- Key people: Chakapong Kamchan (governor)
- Products: Potable water
- Operating income: 26,017 million baht (2014)
- Net income: 5,775 million baht (2014)
- Total assets: 89,226 million baht (2014)
- Number of employees: 7,730 (2014)
- Parent: Ministry of Interior
- Website: Official website

The Provincial Waterworks Authority (PWA) (Thai: การประปาส่วนภูมิภาค) is a Thai state enterprise under the Ministry of Interior. The PWA is responsible for the production and distribution of potable water that meets WHO standards to 74 provinces throughout Thailand—all except Bangkok, Samut Prakan, and Nonthaburi)—which are served by the Metropolitan Waterworks Authority.

== History ==
The Provincial Waterworks Authority was established on 28 February 1979, as a state enterprise under the jurisdiction of the Interior Ministry. Prior to the creation of the PWA, water supply services in the provincial areas had been assigned to two government agencies—the Department of Public Works (DOPW) was in charge of the water supply services in municipal areas outside the Bangkok metropolitan area, while the Department of Health (DOH) took care of rural areas. When the performance of these two agencies was found wanting, the government shifted water supply affairs, along with officials and employees, transferred from DOPW's provincial waterworks division and DOH's rural waterworks division, to the newly created Provincial Waterworks Authority. The governor of the PWA is Mr Seree Supratid.

== Operations ==
As of end-May 2014, the PWA had 7,730 employees, 987 of them working at Bangkok headquarters, and the remaining 6,743 staffers working at 10 PWA regional offices and 233 waterworks across the country. Of Thailand's 20.7 million households, PWA provides water services to 3.6 million of them (24.5 percent of the country's total households) or 16 million persons. A sister-agency, the Metropolitan Waterworks Authority (MWA), provides water services to 2.1 million households (12.5 percent) or 8.4 million persons in Bangkok and two neighboring provinces. Local governments provide water services to 11.5 million households (52.48 percent) or 38.7 million persons in regional areas. Over 3.5 million households (12.41 percent) or 8.25 million persons, mostly in remote rural areas, have no access to piped-water.

== Financials ==
In its fiscal year 2014 (1 October 2013-30 September 2014), PWA reported revenues of 26,017 million baht, total assets of 89,226 million baht, and net profit of 5,775 million baht.

== See also ==
- Metropolitan Waterworks Authority
- Provincial Electricity Authority
