= Ministry of Interior (Thailand) =

Government ministry of Thailand

Coordinates: 13°45′01″N 100°29′51″E

- กระทรวงมหาดไทย
- Seal of Rajasiha by Prince Narisara Nuwattiwong

- Flag of Rajasiha by Prince Narisara Nuwattiwong

Ministry overview
- Formed: 1 April 1892; 134 years ago
- Jurisdiction: Government of Thailand
- Headquarters: Phra Nakhon, Bangkok
- Annual budget: 371,802 million baht (2019)
- Minister responsible: Anutin Charnvirakul, Minister
- Deputy Ministers responsible: Polpheer Suwannachee, Deputy Minister; Jeseth Thaiseth, Deputy Minister; Vorasit Liangprasitl, Deputy Minister
- Ministry executive: Unsit Sampuntharat, Permanent Secretary
- Website: www.moi.go.th

The Ministry of Interior (Thai: กระทรวงมหาดไทย, RTGS: Krasuang Mahatthai) is a cabinet-level department in the Government of Thailand. The ministry has wide ranging responsibilities. It is responsible for local administration, internal security, citizenship, disaster management, road safety, land management, issuance of national identity cards, and public works. The ministry is responsible for appointing the 76 governors of the Provinces of Thailand. The Minister of Interior (Thai: รัฐมนตรีว่าการกระทรวงมหาดไทย) is the head of the ministry. The minister is appointed by the King of Thailand on the recommendation of the prime minister. Since 1 September 2023, the head of the ministry has been Prime Minister Anutin Charnvirakul. He is aided by two deputy ministers. The FY2019 budget of the ministry is 371,802 million baht.

== History ==
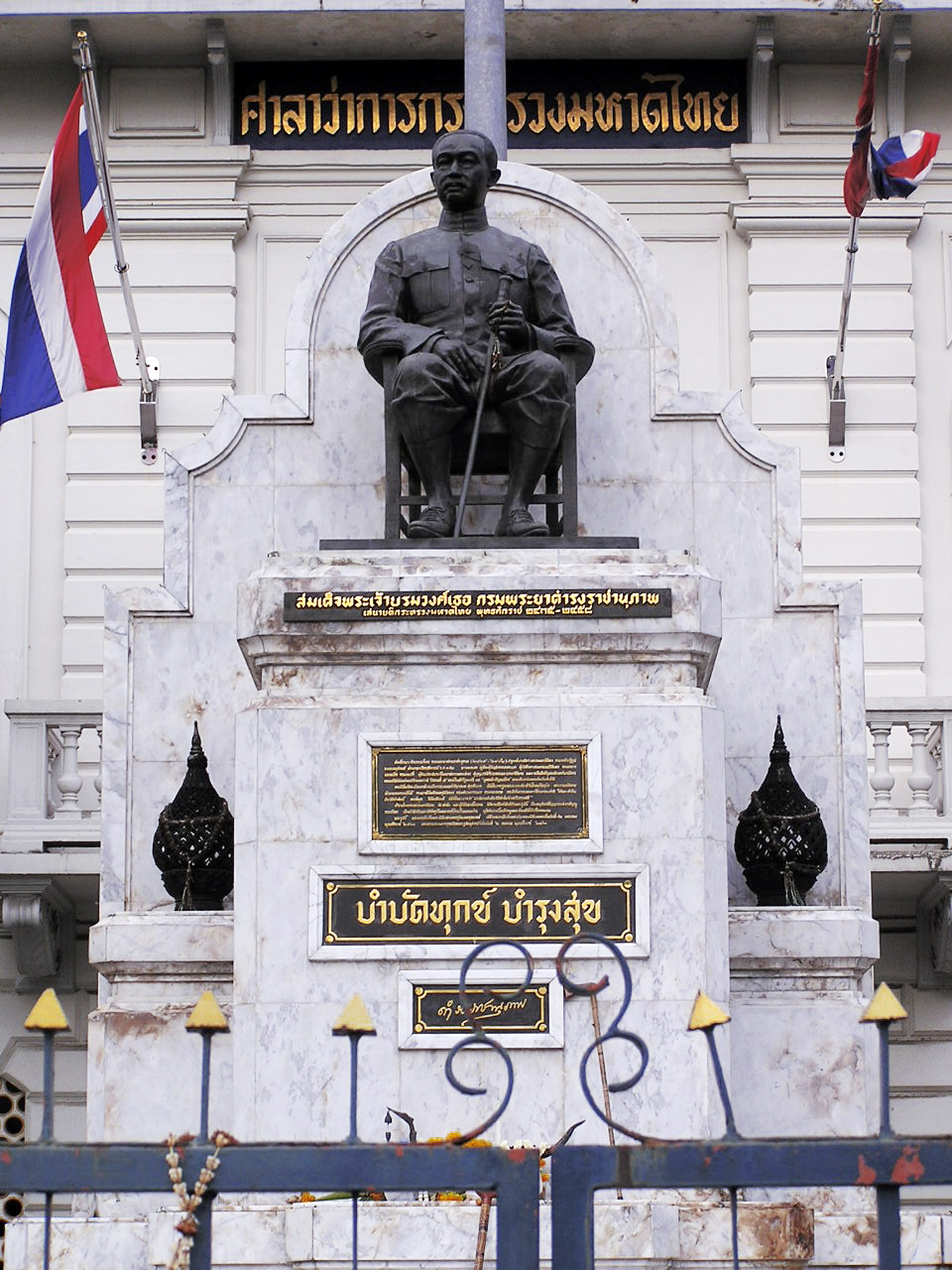
Statue of Prince Damrong Rajanubhab, outside the Ministry of Interior

The ministry in its present form was founded on 1 April 1892 by King Chulalongkorn (Rama V) in his reforms of the Siamese government. He appointed his brother Prince Damrong Rajanubhab, to be its first "minister of state". At the time the ministry was divided into three divisions: central (Thai: กรมมหาดไทยกลาง), northern (Thai: กรมมหาดไทยฝ่ายเหนือ), and local administration (Thai: กรมพลัมภัง).

Prince Damrong reorganized the workings of the entire ministry and as a result the entire country. He created the monthon system, a completely new system of sub-divisions for the kingdom. He and the ministry took on so much power that he was considered second only to the king. After King Vajiravudh (Rama VI) succeeded his father in 1910, the relationship between the king and Prince Damrong deteriorated. In 1915 Prince Damrong resigned, officially for health reasons, though it was an open secret that disagreements with the king were the real reason.

During the Revolution of 1932 (actually a coup d'état), the Minister of Interior was Prince Paribatra Sukhumbandhu, who was exiled after the revolution because of his power. From then on the minister became an appointed position within the Cabinet of Thailand. Most ministers had been former police officials.

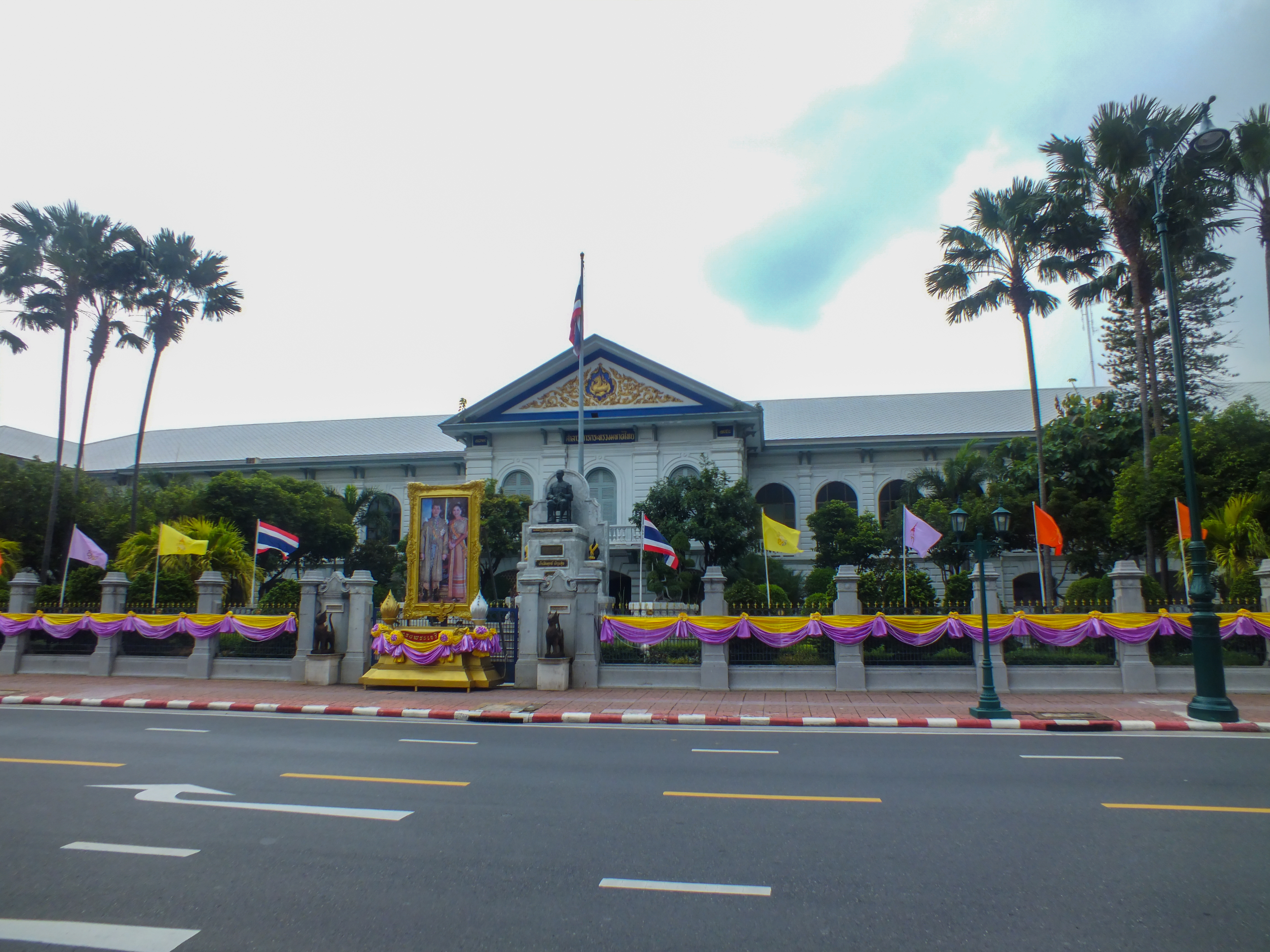
Ministry Headquarters at Atsadang Road in Bangkok

== Thai Niyom ==
The MOI, being responsible for provincial affairs, will, in conjunction with other ministries, deploy 7,663 teams to visit 83,151 communities starting 21 February 2018 to explain the NCPO's Thai Niyom project. At meetings with people in each village, the ministry will a host free lunch for all participants, including villagers, resource persons, and officials. The interior minister explained that most of the Thai Niyom two-billion baht luncheon budget is to be spent on food for villagers, estimated at 50 baht per head. Four visits will be made by officials to each village.

Overall, the program was originally to cost 47 billion baht. In addition to the two billion baht luncheon budget, the combined ministries have been allocated 3.2 billion baht to help farmers switch to "economical crops"; 3.4 billion baht to develop new crop varieties; six billion baht to increase the value of agricultural products and avoid low prices; 15 billion baht to reduce economic inequality and enhance quality of life; 19 billion baht to upgrade irrigation systems; and 769 million baht for a "big data management project". The budget has since swollen to 100 billion baht.

Thai Niyom, as defined by Gen Prayut Chan-o-cha, is "Thainess without ignoring global practices and international norms". It is neither nationalism nor patriotism and it is different from populism. "It is the extent[ion] of the pracharat (people's state) policy which emphasises internal growth and public participation and support while the government seeks cooperation from the private sector and the academic sector. Cooperation creates the power of three—government, public and private sector," he said. A 61-member panel known as "steering committee for development under sustainable Thai Niyom Yangyeun ('Sustainable Thai-ism') projects" was set up to supervise the program. Each tambon (sub-district) team will have 7 to 12 members, consisting of local officials, security personnel, academics and volunteers brought together under the "Tam Kwam Dee Duay Hua Jai" ('Do good deeds by hearts') project. Interior Minister Anupong Paojinda denied the program was aimed at boosting the popularity of the military government. He insisted it was the government's duty to take good care of the people.

The Thai Niyom program was officially launched by Prayut in Nonthaburi Province on 9 February 2018 to all 76 provincial governors, chiefs of 878 districts, and high ranking officials of related agencies. The 100 billion baht program allocates 35 billion baht for "grass-roots" economic development, 34.5 billion baht for tourism, community development, and village funds, and 30 billion for agricultural reform. The four phases of the project run until 20 May 2018.

== Departments ==
=== Administration ===
- Office of the Minister
- Office of the Permanent Secretary

=== Dependent departments ===
- Department of Provincial Administration (DOPA)
  - Volunteer Defense Corps
- Department of Local Administration (DLA)
- Department of Community Development (CDD)
- Department of Lands (DOL)
- Department of Disaster Prevention and Mitigation (DDPM)
- Department of Public Works and Town & Country Planning (DPT)

=== State enterprises ===
- The Marketing Organization
- Wastewater Management Authority
- Metropolitan Electricity Authority
- Provincial Electricity Authority
- Metropolitan Waterworks Authority
- Provincial Waterworks Authority

== See also ==
- Administrative divisions of Thailand
- Cabinet of Thailand
- Government of Thailand
- Provinces of Thailand
- Thesaban
- List of Government Ministers of Thailand
