= Vasudhara =

Buddhist bodhisattva of prosperity

Vasudhārā
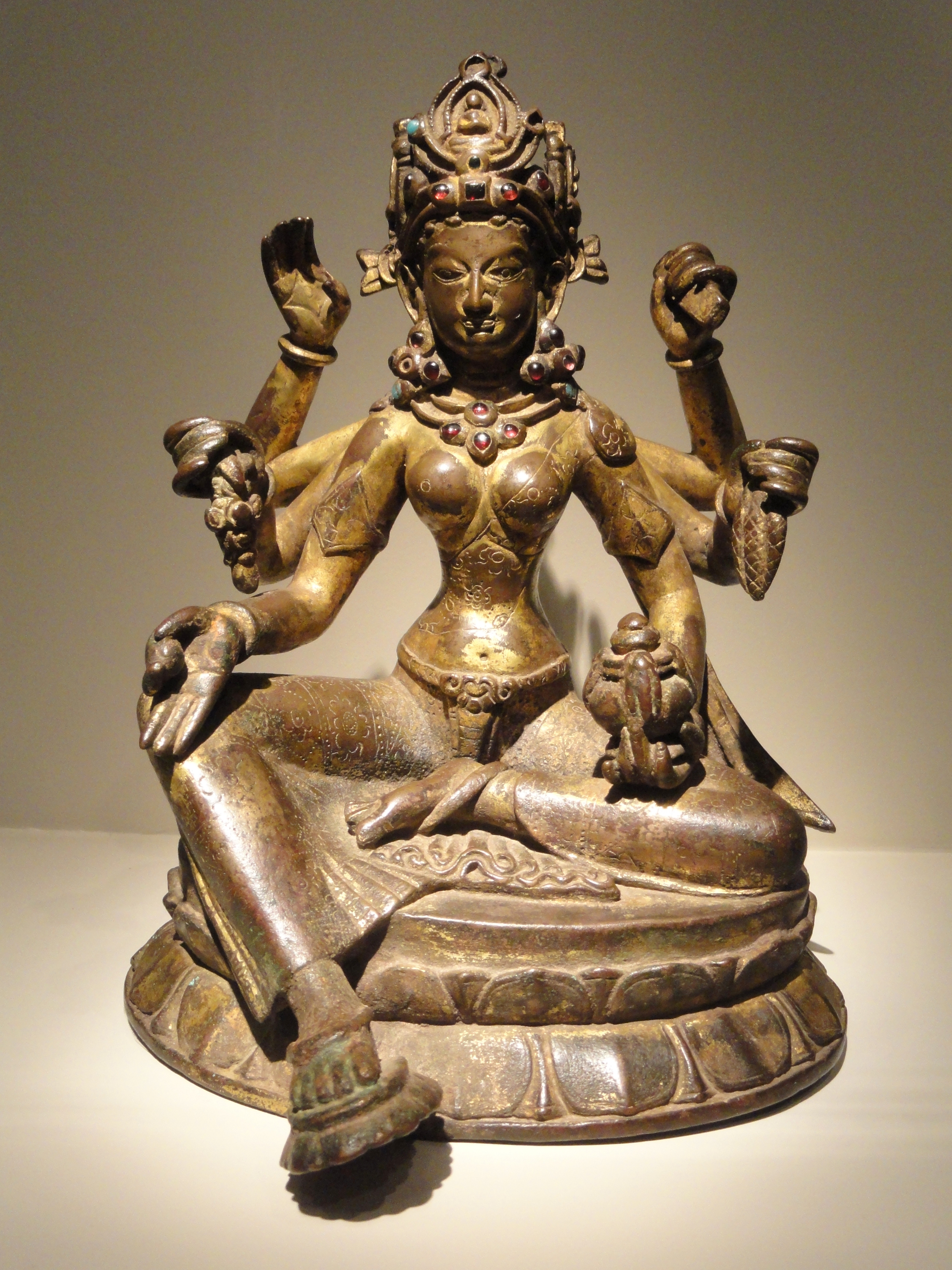
- Sanskrit: वसुधारा Vasudhārā
- Burmese: ဝသုန္ဓရာ
- Chinese: (Traditional) 持世菩薩 (Simplified) 持世菩萨 (Pinyin: Chíshì Púsà) (Traditional) 財源天母 (Simplified) 财源天母 (Pinyin: Cáiyuán Tiānmǔ) 金度母 (Pinyin: Jinˉ Duˋ Muˇ)
- Japanese: 持世菩薩(じせぼさつ) (romaji: Jise Bosatsu)
- Khmer: ព្រះនាងវ៉ាសុនហារ៉ាពោធិសត្វ
- Korean: 지세보살 (RR: Jije Bosal)
- Tagalog: Basudhala
- Thai: พระนางวสุธาราโพธิสัตว์ พระวสุธารา
- Tibetan: ནོར་རྒྱུན་མ་ Wylie: nor rgyun ma
- Vietnamese: Trì Thế Bồ Tát, Tài Nguyên Thiên Nữ

Information
- Venerated by: Mahāyāna, Vajrayāna

Vasudhārā whose name means "stream of gems" in Sanskrit, also known as "Gold Tara", is the Buddhist goddess of wealth, prosperity, and abundance. Her popularity peaks in Nepal where she has a strong following among the Buddhist Newars of the Kathmandu Valley and is thus a central figure in Newar Buddhism. She is one of the most popular goddesses worshipped in many Buddhist countries and is a subject of Buddhist legends and art.

Her short mantra originated from Nepal is Oṃ Vasudhārāyai Svāhā, is now followed across India and beyond.

== Parallels with Bhūmidevī ==
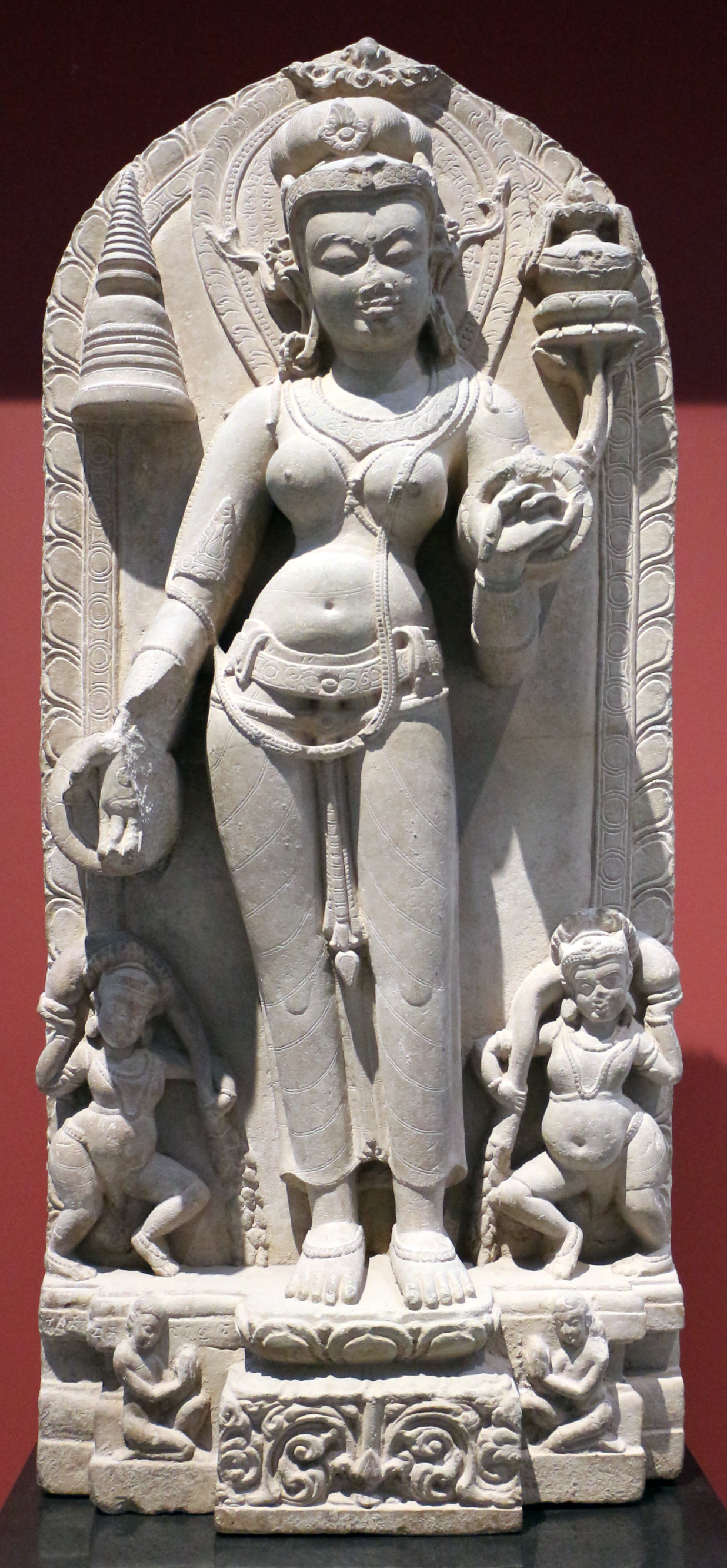
Tenth century sculpture of Vasudhara from the Kurkihar hoard, Bihar, India

Vasudhara is often compared to the Hindu goddess Bhūmidevī. As goddesses of wealth, both deities have a similar iconography and are worshipped for their role in an abundant harvest. Both assume a golden hue in artistic representations, perform the same mudra, and hold similar objects. For example, Vasudhara and Prithvi are often depicted holding gems or having pots of treasure under their feet. It is believed that the convention of depicting Vasudhara standing on vases originated from earlier representations of Bhūmi . Furthermore, both goddesses are often depicted paired with their respective consorts, Prithvi alongside Vishnu and Vasudhara alongside Jambhala.

== Mantra ==
Her mantra is " Oṃ Śrī Vasudhārā Ratna Nidhāna Kṣetri Svāhā", when one takes up Vasudhara practice, 800 mantras (8 rounds of a mala) should be recited on the first day, then 300 mantras (3 rounds of a mala) on every day afterwards, one mala's worth of mantras in the morning, when time permits before work, another mala's worth of mantras when time permits in the late afternoon/evening, perhaps after work, the final mala's worth of mantras before sleeping, or 3 malas all at once any time of the day. It is said that devotees will accumulate 7 kinds of prosperity - wealth, quality, offspring, long life, happiness, praise and wisdom, enabling her devotees to be better equipped to practise generosity, in itself a cause for wealth, as well as having enough resources to be able to engage in spiritual practices. It also believed her practise leads to Enlightenment.

== Legends ==
=== The Inquiry of the Layman Sucandra ===
The origin of Vasudhārā in Buddhism appears in the Buddhist text The Vasudhara Dharani. According to a legend in the text known as “The Inquiry of the Layman Sucandra,” an impoverished layman named Sucandra approaches the Buddha Shakyamuni requesting a way to obtain large amounts of gold, grain, silver, and gems in order to feed his large family and engage in acts of charity with the surplus fortune. Shakyamuni, aware of a mantra about the bodhisattva Vasudhara that would suit his purposes, bestows Sucandra with an incantation and religious ritual that when followed would result in good fortune and prosperity brought on by Vasudhara herself. Upon commencing the rituals and teaching them to others, Sucandra begins to prosper. Noticing his success, the monk Ananda asked Shakyamuni how he had obtained this fortune so quickly. Shakyamuni instructs Ananda to also practice the Vasudhara Dharani and “impart it to others ‘for the good of many’.”.

Although “The Inquiry of the Layman Sucandra” seems to contradict the Buddha’s renunciation of material possessions and earthly pleasures, Shakyamuni does not instruct the monk to recite the mantra for material benefit but instead he stresses that the mantra is for “‘the good of many’ and for ‘the happiness of many’.” Thus the mantra is meant more as means of alleviating suffering rather than obtaining wealth through Vasudhara, who not only grants physical wealth and abundance but also spiritual wealth and abundance.

=== Legends from Taranatha ===
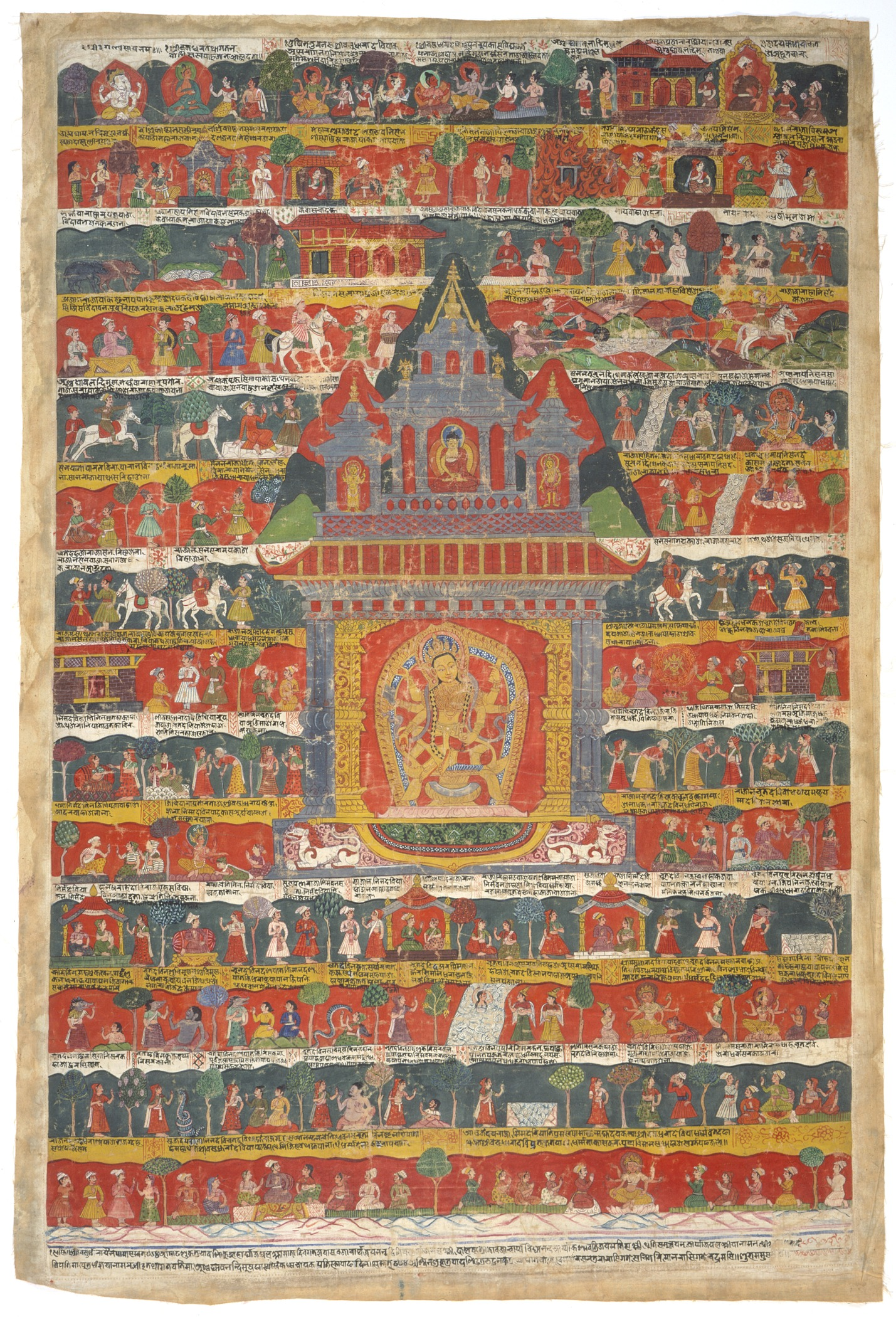
Legend of Vasudhara, 1744 painting from Nepal

Several other legends describing Vasudhara’s generosity are found in the writings of Taranatha (1575–1634), a prominent Tibetan monk and scholar. According to his history, the bodhisattva Vasudhara granted the monk Buddhajnana three hundred pearl necklaces every day. Buddhajnana was also blessed with a steady stream of buyers to purchase these necklaces. With this success, the monk was able to invest his fortune into the monastery by supporting his fellow monks and students, purchasing votive statues and ritual objects, and making generous donations to the monastery. Because he did not use the money amassed for his own personal gain, Vasudhara continued to bestow these gifts on Buddhajnana for the rest of his life. Another legend in Taranatha’s history echoes the legend of “The Inquiry of the Layman Sucundra.” According to the legend, a poor philosopher was struggling to support his family. He encounters a monk devoted to the practice of meditation who teaches him the rites and rituals necessary to meditate on the goddess Vasudhara. He began the rituals and quickly prospered, receiving a large amount of land and a prestigious teaching post at a monastery. As a result, he, like the monk who had once helped him in his time of need, also shared the rites and rituals of Vasudhara with others.

Like the legend of the Inquiry of the Layman Sucandra" these legends are significant because they encourage both the lay and monastic worship of Vasudhara. In addition, they stress the importance of charity, teaching worshippers to share in their good fortune rather than amassing it for themselves.

== Iconography in Buddhist art ==
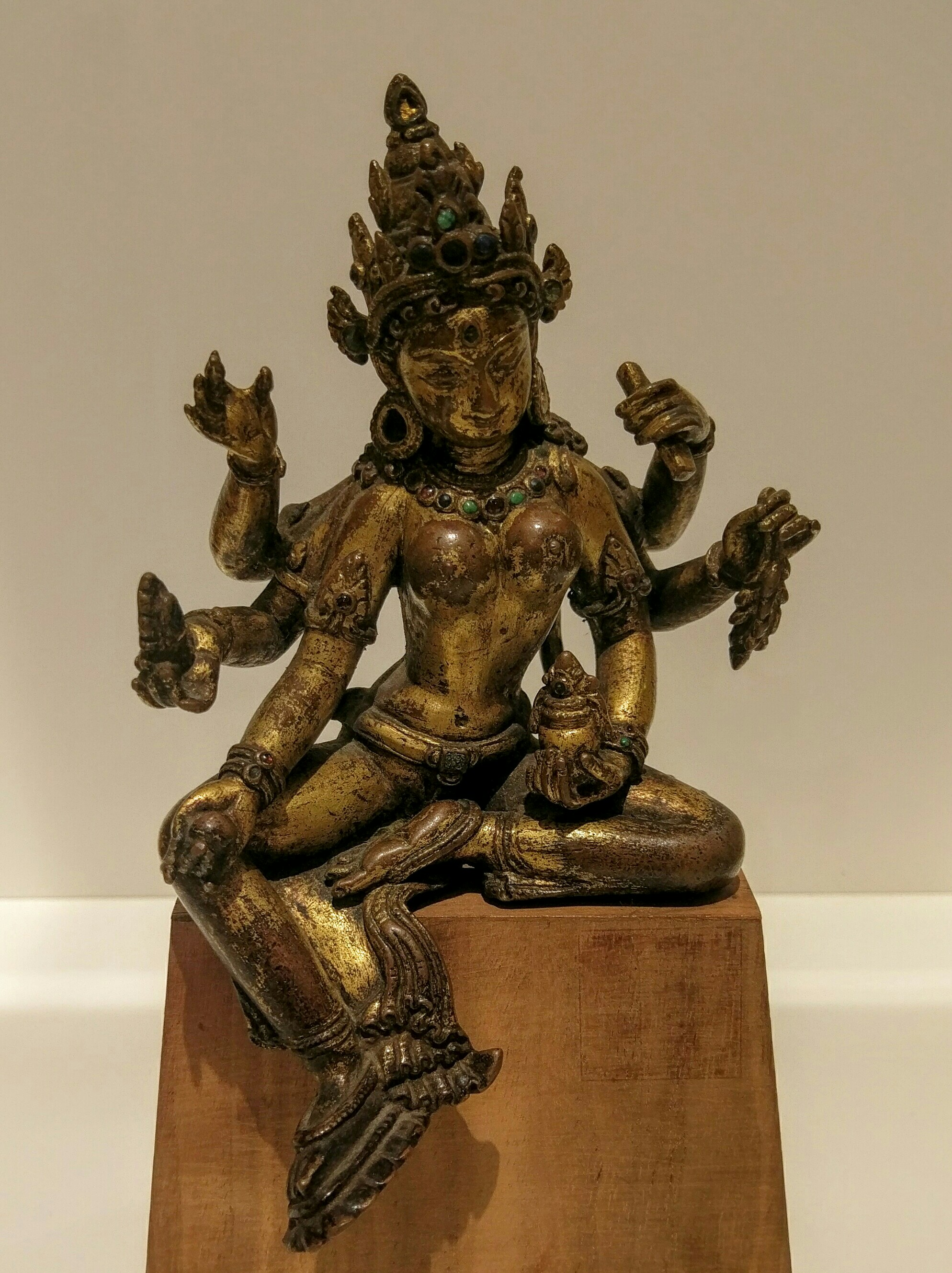
A gilt bronze Vasudhara from Nepal, 12th century CE

In Buddhist art, Vasudhara has a consistent iconography. She can easily be identified as a bodhisattva by the elaborate headdress and the extensive amount of jewelry she wears. Her skin has a golden hue in bronze and painted images. This color is associated with precious metals and symbolizes opulence, fertility, and generosity in Buddhist iconography. Vasudhara is typically seated on a lotus flower base in the lalitasana, or royal pose, with one foot tucked in towards her and the other hanging of the flower base but resting on a small treasure. She can, however, also be represented in a standing position. When standing, Vasudhara has a full vase representing abundance underneath each foot.

Despite this consistency in her representations, the number of her arms may differ from image to image. In visual representations, Vasudhara can have as few as two arms and as many as six. The two-armed representations are more common in Tibetan art and Indian art, while six-armed representations are almost exclusive to Nepalese art. Although the six-armed image originates in India, they are rare and only few examples have been found.

Vasudhara, the 'treasure holder', is a popular Newar goddess of fertility and prosperity, and a consort of the wealth-god Jambhala. She sits in the posture of 'royal ease' on a moon disc and a pink lotus, with her left leg drawn up and her extended right foot resting (similar posture to Green Tara - showing her willingness to "come down from her lotus throne" to help those who call upon her) upon a white conch shell (symbolising having conquered/having perfect control of speech) and a golden treasure-vase (wealth/prosperity). She is beautiful and attractive, as youthful as a sixteen-year-old, and her golden body scintillates with radiant light. Her three beautiful and smiling faces are coloured red (right - red being the colour of controlling), golden (centre, golden being the colour of increasing), and red (left), representing perfect compassion, wisdom understanding, awareness and insight into the past, present and future, she is adorned with the five divine silks and the eight jewelled ornaments. Her first right hand makes the gesture of generosity, while her other two right hands hold the 'Three Jewels' of the Buddha, Dharma and Sangha, - symbolising the necessity of maintaining the commitments of refuge to the three jewels, and a golden rosary, symbolising continuous practise and self-examination, vital to enlightenment. With her three left hands she holds a small treasure-vase, for long life and initiation, an ear of grain, for abundant harvests and earthly benefits, and a sacred text to grant wisdom. In her hands, Vasudhara holds a variety of objects attributed to her. Most representations show her holding a sheaf of corn in her left hand, symbolizing an abundant harvest. She may also be holding a gem or small treasure, a symbol of wealth. Representations with more arms, such as the six-armed Nepali representation, also depict her holding a full vase and the Book of Wisdom. With her free hands, Vasudhara performs mudras. A commonly seen mudra in paintings and figurines featuring Vasudhara is the varada mudra, also known as the charity mudra, which symbolizes the “pouring forth of divine blessings.” In her 2 armed one faced form, she has a golden body, representing the earth element, Ratnasambhava in her crown, sometimes 2 eyes or 3 eyes, if with 3 eyes - representing perfect awareness, understanding, compassion, wisdom and insight into the past, present and future. Her 2 hands holding a sheaf or corn for agricultural prosperity and to "sew the seeds" of enlightenment, and either a single wishfulfilling jewel or a bowl of wish fulfilling jewels for wealth and wish fulfilment. Vasudhara is the subject of numerous bronzes and paintings. She is predominantly the central figure of bronze sculptures or painted mandalas. She may also, however, appear alongside her consort, Vaiśravaṇa (Jambhala) the Buddhist God of Riches. Despite his status, she surpasses him in popularity and is more commonly the central figure of her own mandalas.

== In Nepali Buddhism ==
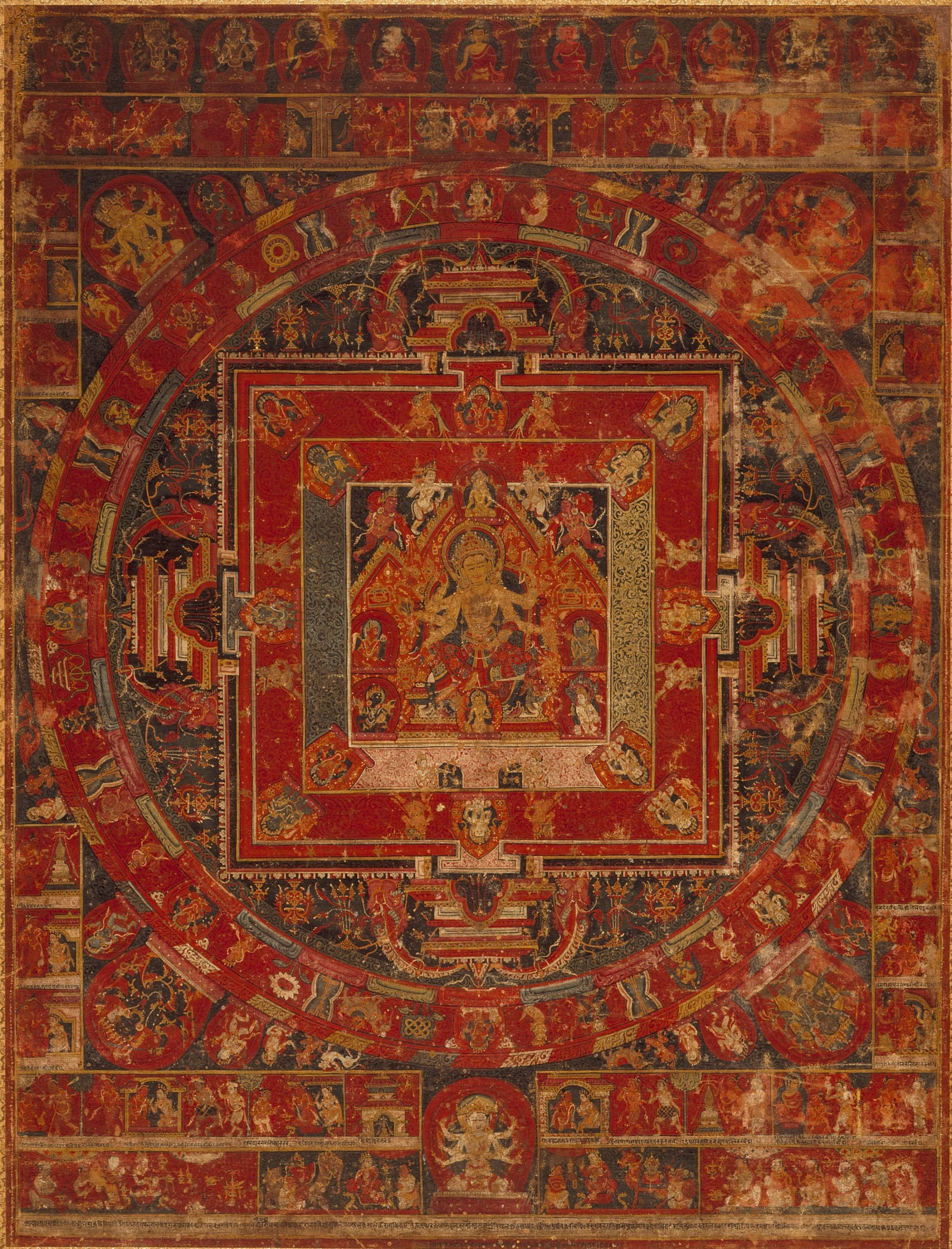
Nepalese painting of the Mandala of Vasudhara, 1495

Vasudhara is particularly popular in Nepali Buddhism among the Buddhist Newars of the Kathmandu Valley. In this region she is a common household deity. This is known from the countless number of bronzes and paintings found representing her. These images are small in size, typically 18 cm or smaller. Because of their small size it is known that these images were primarily for private use, namely household veneration of the goddess. Additionally, there is a cult dedicated to her worship followed by the Buddhist Newars. Followers of this cult believe that her worship brings wealth and stability. Despite the strong following of this cult by the Buddhist Newars, unfortunately, it is now in decline.

As the Bodhisattva of abundance and prosperity, her popularity in this region is due to the predominance of agriculture and trade essential to the economy of the Kathmandu Valley. The Newars believe that her veneration will generally result in good fortune.

=== Mandala ===
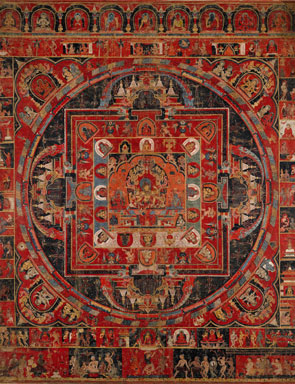
Vasudhara Mandala, by Jasaraja Jirili, Nepal, 1365

One of the earliest Nepalese representations of Vasudhara is a paubha (textile art depicting Hindu and Buddhist images on course cotton), dating back to 1015 C.E. This pauhba is known as the Mandala of Vasudhara. The goddess is the central image of this mandala, which depicts scenes of dedication, ritual initiation, festive music, and dance associated with her worship. Its purpose is didactic (to teach). The mandala teaches the importance of worshipping Vasudhara primarily through the narrative of a non-believer whom she converted to belief.

== In Tibetan Buddhism ==
In addition to her popularity in Nepal, Vasudhara is also an important “wealth deity” in Tibetan Buddhism. Although popular in Tibet, Vasudhara does not assume as important a role as she does in Newar Buddhism. In Tibet, the worship of Vasudhara is limited to mostly lay people as opposed to worship by both lay and monastic life. This is because Tibetan monastic life regards Vasudhara as a “benefactor of the laity” and instead primarily engages in the worship of the goddess Tara for all their needs. This, however, does not mean that monastic life disregards her completely. They do perform rites and rituals to the goddess habitually but it is usually at the request of a patron. She is considered to be one of the 21 Taras, also known as "Golden/Yellow Tara" Tibetan: Dolma Sermo, another name is Norgyunma.

=== Differences in Iconography ===
The iconography of Vasudhara varies slightly in this region. In Tibetan art she appears more commonly with two arms. The six-armed representations, however, also exist and it is believed they filtered into Tibet through Nepal because of the late appearance of these images in manuscripts and art. Unlike Newar art Vasudhara rarely appears alone in Tibetan art. Instead she is paired with Jambhala or appears alongside other deities. Despite these slight differences, most of her iconography remains unchanged and Vasudhara can be easily recognized by her attributes in most Buddhist art.

== Burmese water libation ==
In Burmese Buddhism, the water ceremony, called yay zet cha, which involves the ceremonial pouring of water from a glass into a vase, drop by drop, concludes most Buddhist ceremonies including donation celebrations and feasts. This ceremonial libation is done to share the accrued merit with all other living beings in all 31 planes of existence. While the water is poured, a confession of faith, called the hsu taung imaya dhammanu, is recited and led by the monks. Then, the merit is distributed by the donors, called ahmya wei by saying Ahmya ahmya ahmya yu daw mu gya ba gon law three times, with the audience responding thadu, Pali for "well done." The earth goddess Vasudhara is invoked to witness these meritorious deeds. Afterward, the libated water is poured on soil outside, to return the water to Vasudhara.

== Dharani use by Jains ==
According to the scholar Padmanabh Jaini, a copy of the Vasudhara Dharani, was copied down in 1638 CE and used by Gujarati Jainas in the 1960s. In the private houses of Jain laypeople, this dharani could be heard being recited by non-Jain, Brahmin priests.

== See also ==
- Bodhisattva
- Śrīmahādevī, another Buddhist deity associated with wealth
- Phra Mae Thorani cult of Vasudhara peculiar to people of Burma, Cambodia, Thailand and Laos
