= Tha Muang district =

Tha Muang ท่าม่วง
- District
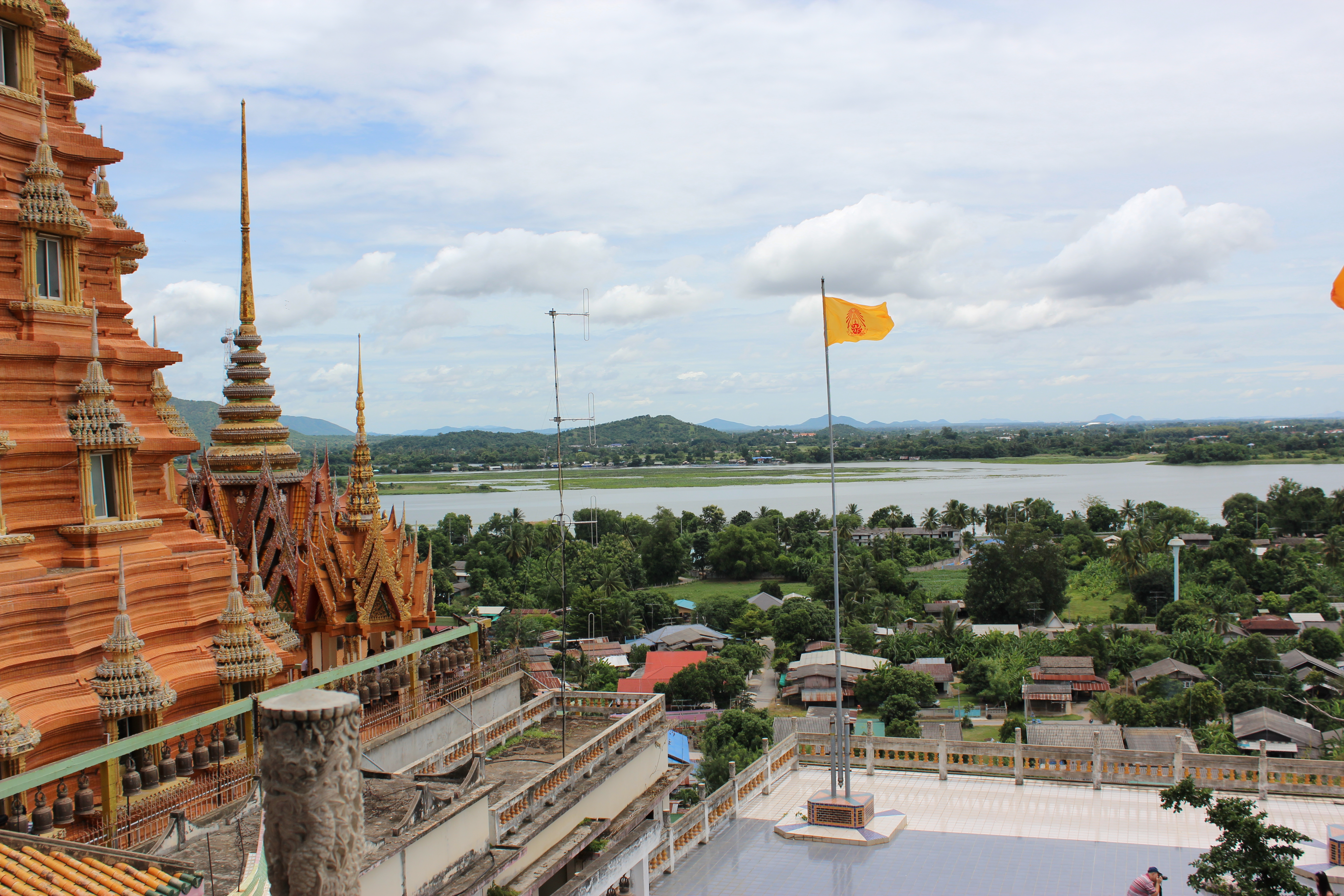
- Muang Chum village, view from Wat Tham Seu

- District location in Kanchanaburi province
- Coordinates: 13°58′0″N 99°38′19″E
- Country: Thailand
- Province: Kanchanaburi
- Seat: Tha Muang

Area
  - Total: 611 km^{2} (236 sq mi)

Population (2024)
  - Total: 109,000
  - Density: 178/km^{2} (460/sq mi)
- Time zone: UTC+7 (ICT)
- Postal code: 71110
- Calling code: 034
- ISO 3166 code: TH-7106

Tha Muang (ท่าม่วง, pronounced [tʰâː mûa̯ŋ]) is a district (amphoe) in the southern part of Kanchanaburi province, central Thailand and is located west of Bangkok.

== History ==
The district was established in 1898. Later people in the district moved southward to nearby Wat Si Loha Rat Bamrung. They changed the district name to Wang Khanai (วังขนาย). In 1939 Phra Woraphak Phibun, then head of the district, renamed the district Tha Muang after the name of the central tambon.

== Geography ==
Neighbouring districts are (from the west clockwise) Dan Makham Tia, Mueang Kanchanaburi, Phanom Thuan, Tha Maka of Kanchanaburi Province, Ban Pong, and Chom Bueng of Ratchaburi province.

The important water resource is the Mae Klong River. The Mae Klong Dam on the Mae Klong River is in the district.

== Administration ==
=== Provincial administration ===
The district is divided into thirteen subdistricts (tambons), which are further subdivided into 119 administrative villages (mubans).

No.	Subdistrict	Thai	Villages	Pop.
1.	Tha Muang	ท่าม่วง	5	12,366
2.	Wang Khanai	วังขนาย	7	9,331
3.	Wang Sala	วังศาลา	10	11,781
4.	Tha Lo	ท่าล้อ	6	10,530
5.	Nong Khao	หนองขาว	12	9,427
6.	Thung Thong	ทุ่งทอง	8	9,348
7.	Khao Noi	เขาน้อย	8	5,370
8.	Muang Chum	ม่วงชุม	5	5,495
9.	Ban Mai	บ้านใหม่	11	7,610
10.	Phang Tru	พังตรุ	9	8,733
11.	Tha Takro	ท่าตะคร้อ	7	3,872
12.	Rang Sali	รางสาลี่	15	6,803
13.	Nong Tak Ya	หนองตากยา	16	8,334
		Total	119	109,000

=== Local government ===
==== Municipalities ====
As of December 2024 there are: nine municipal (thesaban) areas in the district: these are subdistrict municipalities (thesaban tambons) of which Muang Chum, Wang Khanai and Wang Sala cover the whole subdistrict; Nong Khao, Nong Tak Ya, Tha Lo and Tha Muang cover parts of the same named subdistrict; Nong Ya Dok Khao covers parts of Nong Tak Ya and Sam Rong covers parts of Phang Tru subdistrict. Also parts of Tha Lo subdistrict belongs to Kanchanaburi town municipality.

Subdistrict municipality	Pop.	LAO code	website
Wang Sala	11,781	05710607	wangsala.go.th
Tha Muang	9,351	05710602	tmm-kan.go.th
Wang Khanai	9,331	05710606	wangkanai.go.th
Tha Lo	9,230	05710608	thalor.go.th
Muang Chum	5,495	05710609	muangchumcity.go.th
Nong Khao	4,857	05710604	nongkhaolocal.go.th
Nong Tak Ya	3,045	05710605	nongtakya.go.th

Nong Ya Dok Khao subd.mun.	Pop.	05710601	nongkhao.go.th
Nong Khao	4,570		

Sam Rong subdistrict mun.	Pop.	05710603	sumrong.go.th
Phang Tru	1,778		

==== Subdistrict Administrative organizations ====
The non-municipal areas are administered by eight subdistrict administrative organizations - SAO (ongkan borihan suan tambon - o bo toh).

Subdistrict adm.org - SAO	Pop.	LAO code	website
Thung Thong SAO	9,348	06710610	thungthong-kan.go.th
Ban Mai SAO	7,610	06710509	banmaikan.go.th
Phang Tru SAO	6,955	06710513	pangtru-thamuang.go.th
Rang Sali SAO	6,803	06710516	rangsali.go.th
Khao Noi SAO	5,370	06710521	khaonoilocal.go.th
Nong Tak Ya SAO	5,289	06710512	nongtakyasao.go.th
Tha Takro SAO	3,872	06710511	thatakro.go.th
Tha Muang SAO	3,015	06710514	thamuang-kan.go.th

== Education ==
- 44 primary schools
- 6 secondary schools

== Healthcare ==
=== Hospital ===
Tha Muang district is served by one hospital

- Somdet Prasangkharach XIX Hospital with 141 beds.

=== Health promoting hospitals ===
In the district there are fourteen health-promoting hospitals in total; every subdistrict have one, but Nong Tak Ya and Phang Tru each have two.

== Religion ==
There are fifty-five Theravada Buddhist temples in the district.

1 Tha Muang	1 Tha Takro	1 Wang Khanai	2 Rang Sali	3 Thung Thong
3 Wang Sala	4 Nong Khao	4 Tha Lo	5 Khao Noi	5 Muang Chum
6 Phang Tru	7 Ban mai	13 Nong Tak Yai

The Christians have two churches and muslims have one mosque.
