= Sakunothayan Botanical Garden =

Botanical garden in Thailand

- สวนพฤกษศาสตร์สกุโณทยาน
- Type: Botanical garden and urban forest
- Location: Wang Thong, Phitsanulok, Thailand
- Coordinates: 16°50′30″N 100°31′53″E
- Area: 1.3 km^{2} (0.50 sq mi)
- Created: 1955
- Operated by: Forest and Plant Conservation Research Office

Sakunothayan Botanical Garden (Thai: สวนพฤกษศาสตร์สกุโณทยาน) is a botanical garden in Wang Thong District, Phitsanulok Province, northern Thailand. The park, at kilometer 33 of Phitsanulok-Lomsak Road, has 164 species of plants.

== History ==
In 1955, "Wang Nok Aen Forest park" was established with a total area of approximately 130 ha (320 acres). Royal Forest Department changed its name to "Sakunothayan Forest Park" in 1958 and to "Sakunothayan Arboretum" in 1961.
On 4 February 2018 Department of National Parks, Wildlife and Plant Conservation upgraded it to "Sakunothayan Botanical Garden".

== Wang Nok Aen Waterfall ==
Wang Nok Aen or Sakunothayan Waterfall, within the arboretum, is a 10 metres (33 ft) elevation drop of the Wang Thong River.

== Location ==
Sakunothayan Botanical Garden in overview PARO 11 (Phitsanulok)

38) Sakunothayan Botanical Garden in overview PARO 11

| | Botanical garden | | | | |
| 38 | Sakunothayan | | | | |
| | National park | | | | |
| 1 | Khao Kho | | | | |
| 2 | Khwae Noi | 3 | Lam Nam Nan | 4 | Nam Nao |
| 5 | Namtok Chat Trakan | 6 | Phu Hin Rong Kla | 7 | Phu Soi Dao |
| 8 | Tat Mok | 9 | Thung Salaeng Luang | 10 | Ton Sak Yai |
| | Wildlife sanctuary | | | | |
| 11 | Mae Charim | 12 | Nam Pat | 13 | Phu Khat |
| 14 | Phu Miang-Phu Thong | 15 | Phu Pha Daeng | 16 | Tabo-Huai Yai |
