= Lam Nam Nan National Park =

National park in Thailand

- อุทยานแห่งชาติลำน้ำน่าน
- IUCN category II (national park)
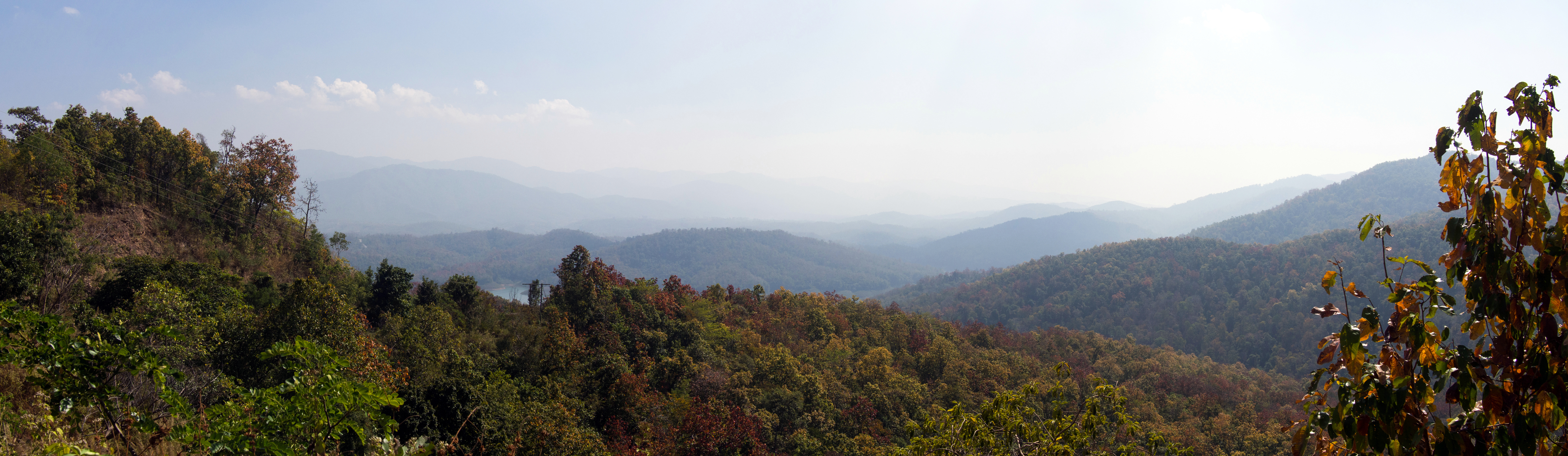
- Phi Pan Nam mountains near Sirikit reservoir

- Location within Thailand
- Location: Thailand
- Nearest city: Uttaradit
- Coordinates: 18°3′48″N 100°32′55″E
- Area: 999 km^{2} (386 sq mi)
- Established: 30 September 1998
- Visitors: 27,926 (in 2019)
- Governing body: Department of National Parks, Wildlife and Plant Conservation

Lam Nam Nan National Park (Thai: อุทยานแห่งชาติลำน้ำน่าน, RTGS: Utthayan Haeng Chat Lam Nam Nan) is a national park in Thailand's Phrae and Uttaradit provinces. The national park covers an area of 999 square kilometres (386 sq mi) and was established in 1998, it is home to rugged mountains and the reservoir of the Sirikit Dam.

== Geography ==
Lam Nam Nan National Park is located about 50 kilometres (30 mi) north of Uttaradit town in the Mueang district of Phrae Province and the Tha Pla and Nam Pat districts of Uttaradit Province. The park's area is 622,839 rai ~ 999 square kilometres (386 sq mi). High mountains in the Phi Pan Nam Range include: Doi Cha Khan, Doi Mae Naeng, Doi Pang Muang Kham, Poi Pha Dub, Doi Sam Phak Hei Yok, Doi San Pha Mu, Khao Hat La, Khao Huai Chan, Phu Khon Kaen, Phu Mon Krataai and Phu Phaya Pho is the highest peak with 1,350 metres (4,430 ft), and are the boundary of Uttaradit province and Phrae province. The Sirikit Dam, impounding the Nan River, forms a large reservoir in the park. The park's streams also feed the Yom River, a tributary of the Nan.

== History ==
Lam Nam Nan was proposed for inclusion in the national parks system. Lam Nam Nan was declared a national park, which was announced in the Government Gazette, volume 115, part. 67 kor, dated 30 September 1998.
Since 2002 this national park has been managed by region 11 (Phitsanulok)

== Attractions ==
The Sirikit Dam reservoir is a popular boating recreation spot and features a number of small islands and reefs. Choeng Thong waterfall is a year-round waterfall located on the Phrae side of the park. Phu Phaya Pho mountain offers sweeping views of the surrounding mountains and forested landscape.

== Flora ==
The park features numerous forest types, including deciduous, deciduous dipterocarp and dry evergreen forest. Plants include:

- Afzelia xylocarpa
- Dalbergia oliveri
- Dipterocarpus alatus
- Dipterocarpus tuberculatus
- Duabanga grandiflora
- Hopea ferrea
- Hopea odorata
- Lagerstroemia spp.
- Morinda citrifolia
- Prunus cerasoides
- Pterocarpus macrocarpus
- Shorea obtusa
- Shorea siamensis
- Tectona grandis
- Terminalia spp.
- Tetrameles nudiflora
- Xylia xylocarpa

== Fauna ==
The number of sightings in the park are:
Thirty-three species of mammals including:

- Asian black bear
- Bat
- Fishing cat
- Muntjac
- Asian palm civet
- Malayan porcupine
- Sambar deer
- Mainland serow
- Sun bear
- Wild boar

Birds:

60 species of passerine from 22 families including:

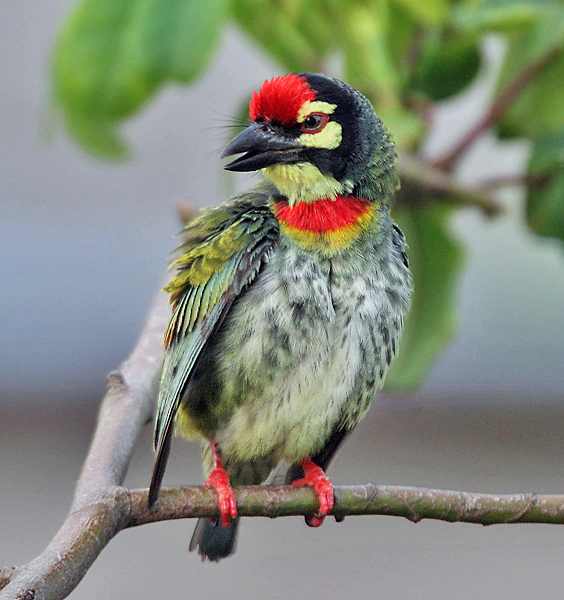
Coppersmith barbet

- Barn swallow
- Bar-winged flycatcher-shrike
- Black-naped monarch
- Black-throated laughingthrush
- Black-throated sunbird
- Common iora
- Common rosefinch
- Golden babbler
- Greater racket-tailed drongo
- Grey-backed shrike
- Grey-headed canary-flycatcher
- Grey-winged blackbird
- Indian white-eye
- Olive-backed pipit
- Oriental magpie-robin
- Puff-throated babbler
- Red-whiskered bulbul
- Rufescent prinia
- Scarlet minivet
- Slender-billed oriole
- Sulphur-breasted warbler
- Yellow-bellied warbler

20 species of non-passerine species including:

- Asian emerald dove
- Bay woodpecker
- Blue-bearded bee-eater
- Coppersmith barbet
- Green-billed malkoha
- Red junglefowl
- Shikra
- Vernal hanging parrot

Reptiles:

- Bengal monitor
- Burmese python
- Butterfly lizard
- Cobra
- Gekko
- King cobra
- Ptyas
- Reticulated python

Amphibians:

- Asian common toad
- Banded bullfrog
- Big-headed turtle
- Blyth's river frog
- Chinese edible frog
- Common green frog

Fishes:

- Clown featherback
- Giant snakehead
- Goby fishes
- Java barb
- Jullien's golden carp
- Mekong giant catfish
- Nile tilapia
- Pla ta kok
- Pangasius

== Location ==
Lam Nam Nan National Park in overview PARO 11 (Phitsanulok)

3) Lam Nam Nan National park in overview PARO 11 (Phitsanulok)

	National park			1	Khao Kho
2	Khwae Noi	3	Lam Nam Nan	4	Nam Nao
5	Namtok Chat Trakan	6	Phu Hin Rong Kla	7	Phu Soi Dao
8	Tat Mok	9	Thung Salaeng Luang	10	Ton Sak Yai
	Wildlife sanctuary				
11	Mae charim	12	Nam Pat	13	Phu Khat
14	Phu Miang-Phu Thong	15	Phu Pha Daeng	16	Tabo-Huai Yai

== See also ==
- List of national parks in Thailand
- DNP - Lam Nam Nan National Park
- List of Protected Areas Regional Offices of Thailand
