= Ton Sak Yai National Park =

National park in Thailand

- อุทยานแห่งชาติต้นสักใหญ่
- IUCN category II (national park)
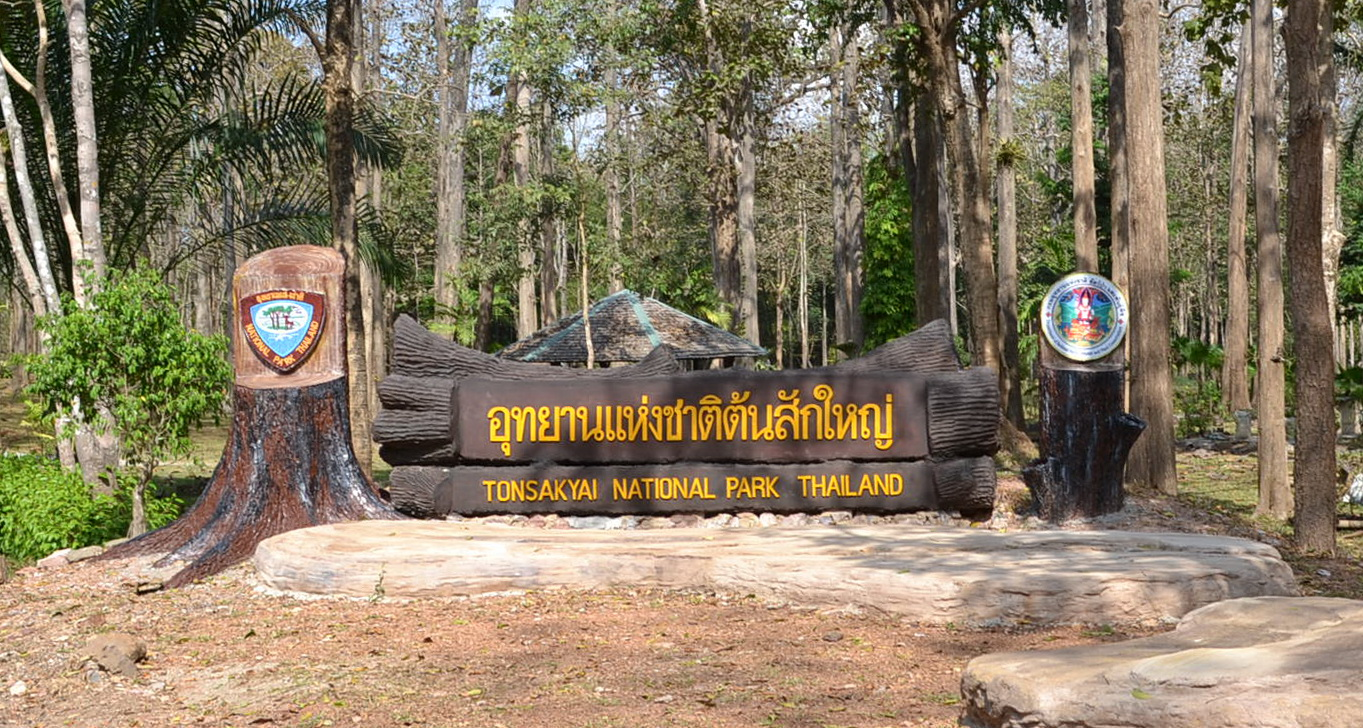

- Location within Thailand
- Location: Uttaradit Province, Thailand
- Nearest city: Uttaradit
- Coordinates: 17°39′N 100°34′E
- Area: 519 km^{2} (200 sq mi)
- Established: December 4, 2003
- Visitors: 4,089 (in 2019)
- Governing body: Department of National Parks, Wildlife and Plant Conservation

Ton Sak Yai National Park (Thai: อุทยานแห่งชาติต้นสักใหญ่, RTGS: Utthayan Haeng Chat Ton Sak Yai) is a national park in Nam Pat, Tha Pla, Thong Saen Khan and Mueang Uttaradit districts in Uttaradit Province, Thailand, it was formerly known as Khlong Tron National Park.

== Geography ==
Ton Sak Yai National Park is located about 90 kilometres (56 mi) east of Uttaradit town in Nam Pat, Pak Huay Chalong, Huay Sisead, Khlong Tron Fang Khwa and Khlong Tron Fang Say forests in Uttaradit province. The park's area is 324,240 rai ~ 519 square kilometres (200 sq mi) and neighbouring Lam Nam Nan National Park and Nam Pat Wildlife Sanctuary to the north, abutting Phu Miang-Phu Thong Wildlife Sanctuary to the east and neighbouring Khao Yai-Khao Na Pha Thong & Khao Ta Phrom non-hunting area to the west. It is a high and a low mountain range, such as Khao Chan, Khao Daet, Khao Khwam Ruea, Khao Mai Pha, Khao Nam Yoi, Khao Ngai Ruea, Khao Phak Khwang, Khao Sam Liam, Khao Tak Bon, Khao Thanon, Khao Yuak and Khao Phu Miang is with 1,500 metres (4,900 ft) the highest. The park's streams feed the Nan River.

== Climate ==
Ton Sak Yai National park has a tropical savanna climate (Köppen climate classification category Aw), which is divided into three seasons. The rainy or southwest mansoon season, with hot weather from May until September. Winter or northeast mansoon season, with cold weather from October until February. Summer or pre-mansoon season, from March until April. Temperature statistics: maximum temperature is 43 °C (109 °F) and lowest temperature is 13 °C (55 °F).

== History ==
In December 1990, a survey was set up in the Khlong Tron National Forest Reserve in Mueang Uttaradit and Nam Pat districts of Uttaradit province. The name was "Khlong Tron National park". On November 8, 1994, a draft decree was proposed to establish a national park, including Nam Pat Forest, Pak Huay Chalong Forest, Huay Sisead Forest, Khlong Tron Fang Khwa Forest and Khong Tron Fang Say Forest. On December 4, 2003, Khlong Tron National Park, covering an area of 519 km^{2} (200 sq mi) was declared the 103rd national park and managed by region 11 (Phitsanulok). On July 12, 2012, the name of the park was changed to "Ton Sak Yai National Park", after the 1500 year old teak tree with a circumference of 10 meters.

== Flora ==
The park features forest types, including hill evergreen forest, coniferous forest, tropical evergreen forest, dry evergreen forest, mixed deciduous forest and dry dipterocarp forest.
Plants species include:

- Anisoptera costata
- Cratoxylum formosum
- Dipterocarpus alatus
- Dipterocarpus obtusifolius
- Dipterocarpus tuberculatus
- Hopea ferrea
- Irvingia malayana
- Lagerstroemia calyculata
- Lagerstroemia venusta
- Lithocarpus cantleyanus
- Magnolia champaca
- Magnolia floribunda
- Phyllanthus emblica
- Pterocarpus macrocarpus
- Schleichera oleosa
- Shorea obtusa
- Shorea siamensis
- Tectona grandis
- Terminalia chebula
- Toona ciliata
- Vitex pinnata
- Xylia xylocarpa

== Fauna ==
Mammals in the park are:

- Asian palm civet
- Asiatic black bear
- Barking deer
- Bengal slow loris
- Black giant squirrel
- Burmese hare
- Clouded leopard
- Fishing cat
- Javan mongoose
- Lesser Malay chevrotain
- Macaque
- Mainland serow
- Malayan porcupine
- Northern treeshrew
- Wild boar

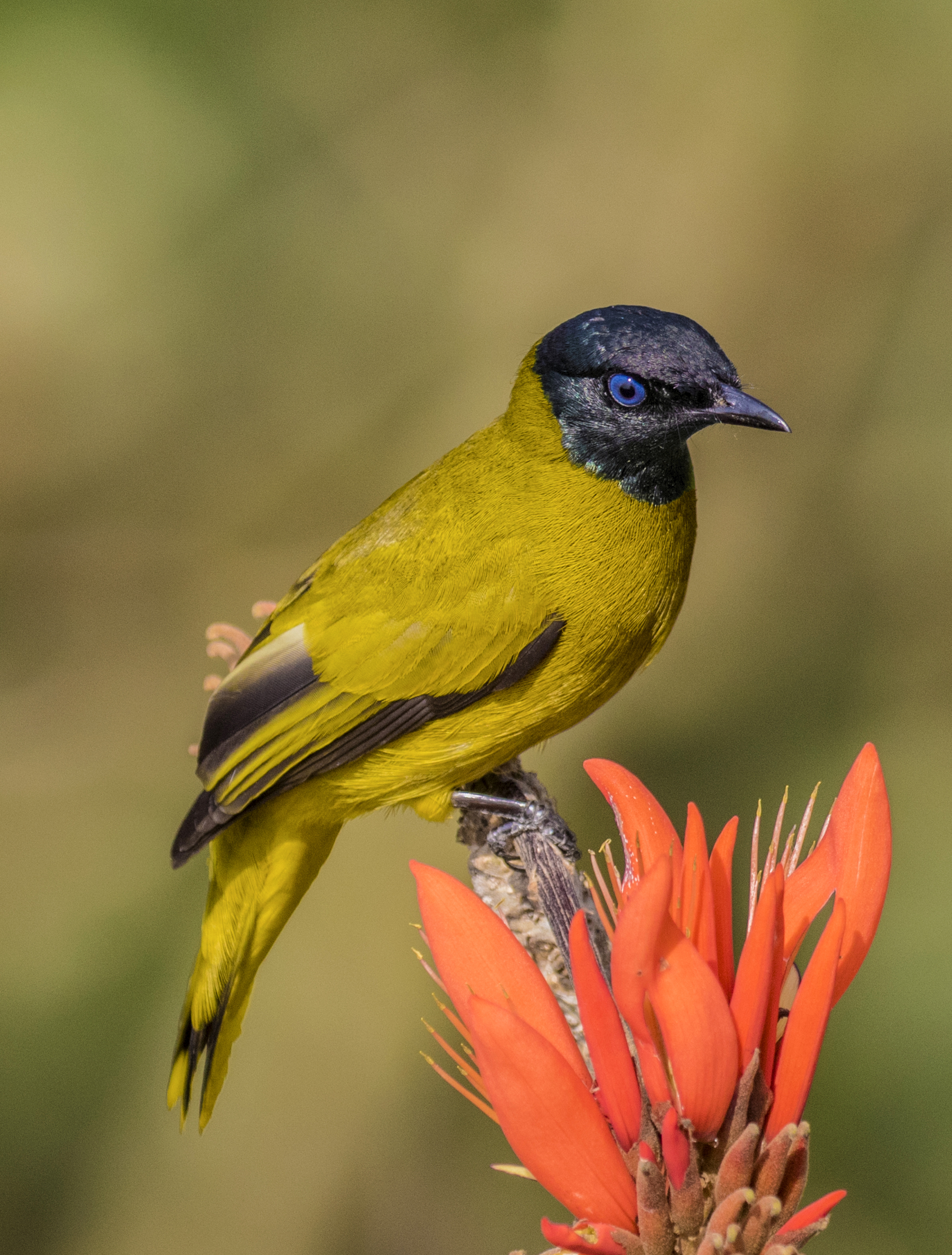
Black-headed bulbul

Birds, the park has some 60 species, of which some 40 species of passerine from 22 families, represented by one species:

- Ashy drongo
- Bar-winged flycatcher-shrike
- Black-headed bulbul
- Black-naped monarch
- Black-naped oriole
- Blue pitta
- Blue-winged leafbird
- Buff-chested babbler
- Common hill myna
- Common iora
- Common tailorbird
- Grey-headed canary-flycatcher
- Olive-backed sunbird
- Puff-throated babbler
- Richard's pipit
- Scarlet minivet
- Striated swallow
- White-bellied erpornis
- White-crested laughingthrush
- White-rumped shama
- Yellow-bellied warbler
- Yellow-vented flowerpecker

and some 20 species of non-passerine from 14 families, represented by one species:

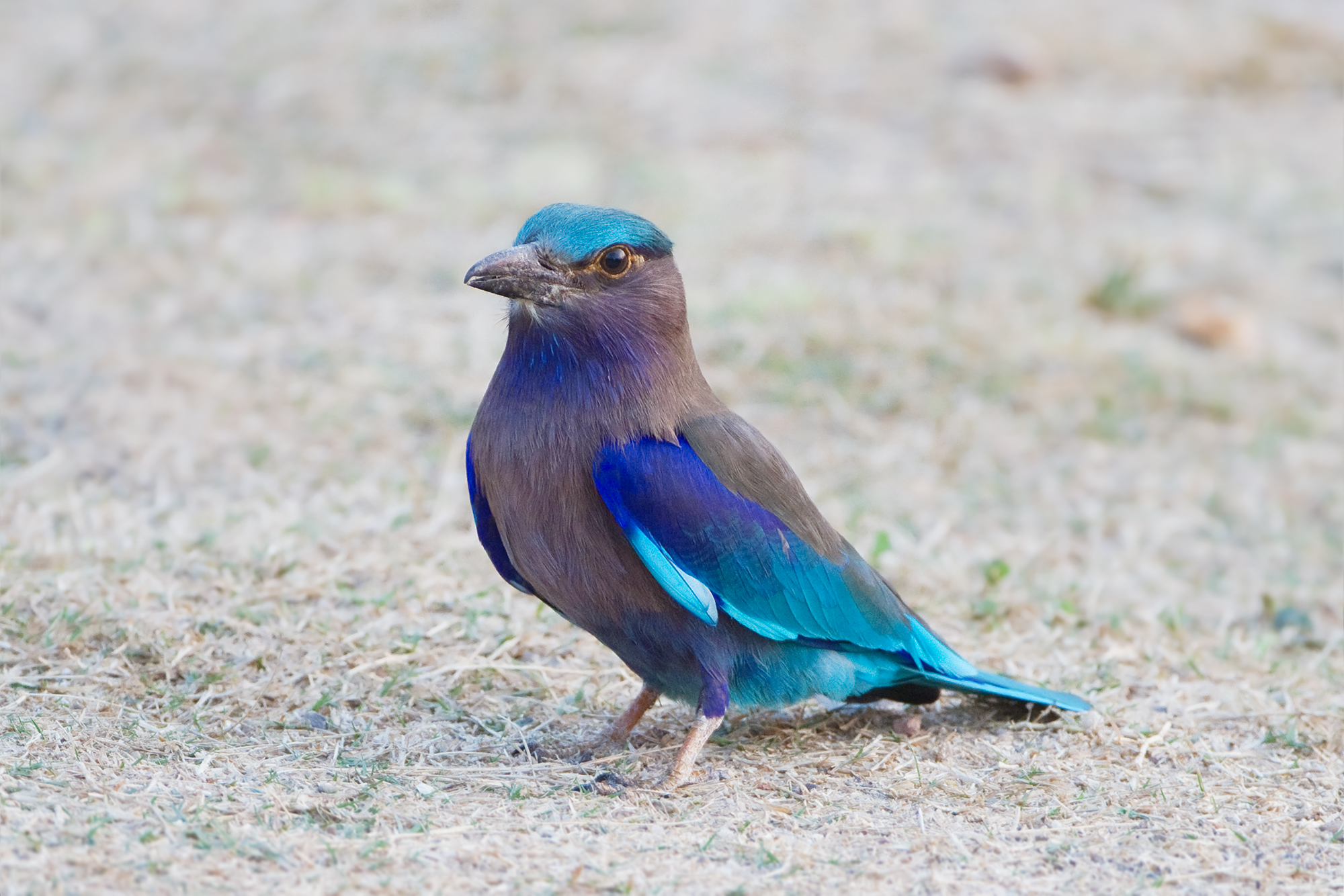
Indochinese roller

- Asian barred owlet
- Black baza
- Brown-backed needletail
- Collared falconet
- Common flameback
- Green-billed malkoha
- Indochinese roller
- Lineated barbet
- Oriental darter
- Osprey
- Red-wattled lapwing
- Silver pheasant
- Striated heron
- Thick-billed green pigeon

== Places ==
- Namtok Huay Khom - three waterfalls, one 11-tiered 15 metres (49 ft), one 2-tiered 15 metres (49 ft) and one 20 metres (66 ft) high waterfall.
- Namtok Huay Niam - a 3-tiered 5 metres (16 ft) high waterfall.
- Namtok Huay Sai - a 35 metres (115 ft) high waterfall.
- Namtok Khlong Tron - a 4-tiered 20 metres (66 ft) high and a 30 metres (98 ft) high waterfall.
- Namtok Phu Miang - a 11-tiered 30–45 metres (98–148 ft) high waterfall.
- Tham Chan - a 200 metres (660 ft) deep and 15 metres (49 ft) wide cave.
- Ton Sak Yai - a 47 metres (154 ft) high teak tree with a circumference of 10 metres (33 ft), approximately 1,500 years old.

== Location ==
Ton Sak Yai National Park in overview PARO 11 (Phitsanulok)

10) Ton Sak Yai National Park in overview PARO 11 (Phitsanulok)

| | National park | | | 1 | Khao Kho |
| 2 | Khwae Noi | 3 | Lam Nam Nan | 4 | Nam Nao |
| 5 | Namtok Chat Trakan | 6 | Phu Hin Rong Kla | 7 | Phu Soi Dao |
| 8 | Tat Mok | 9 | Thung Salaeng Luang | 10 | Ton Sak Yai |
| | Wildlife sanctuary | | | | |
| 11 | Mae Charim | 12 | Nam Pat | 13 | Phu Khat |
| 14 | Phu Miang-Phu Thong | 15 | Phu Pha Daeng | 16 | Tabo-Huai Yai |

== See also ==
- List of national parks in Thailand
- DNP - Ton Sak Yai National Park
- List of Protected Areas Regional Offices of Thailand
