= Phu Hin Rong Kla National Park =

National park of Thailand

- อุทยานแห่งชาติภูหินร่องกล้า
- IUCN category II (national park)
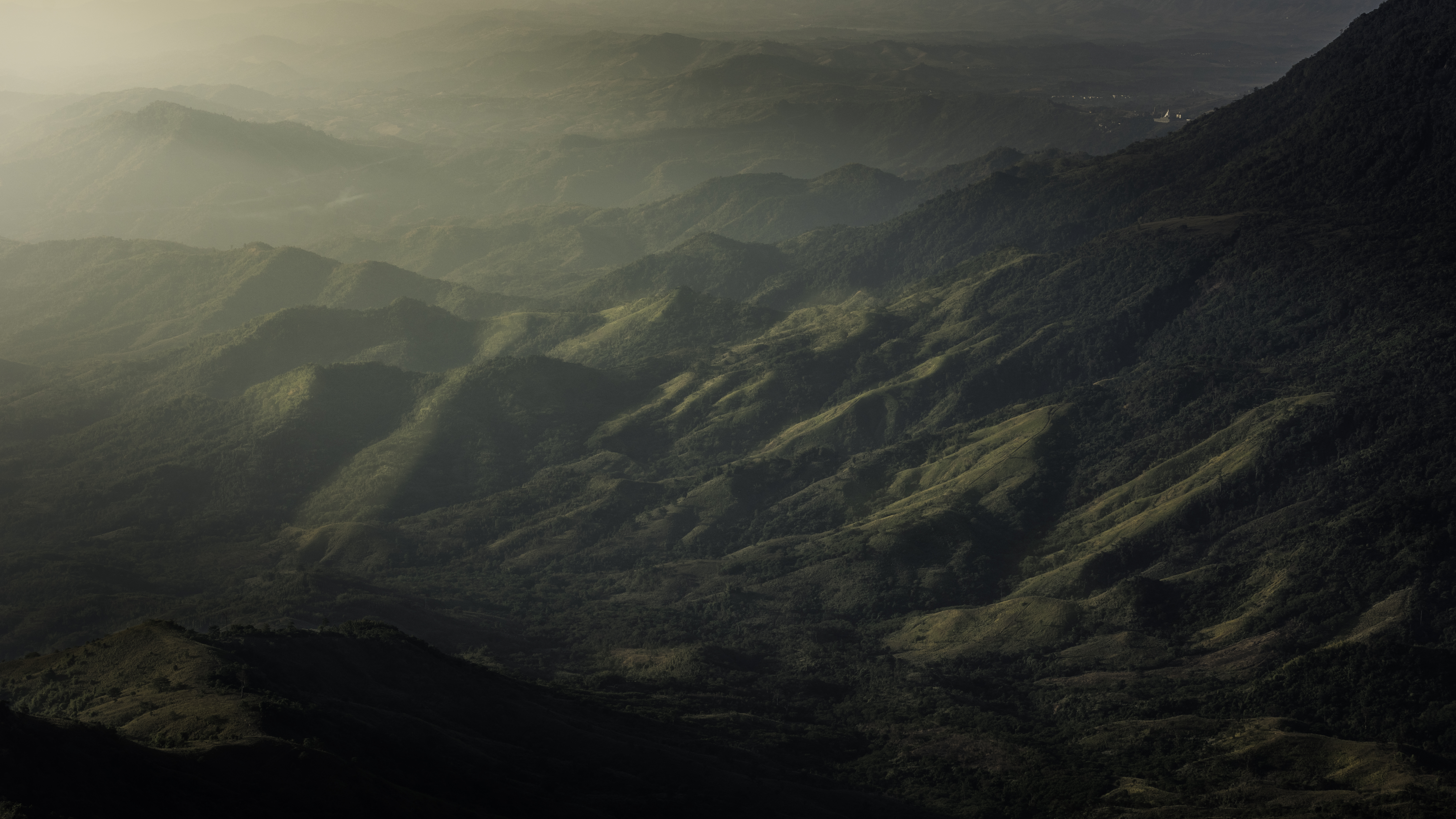
- Landform
- Interactive map of Phu Hin Rong Kla National Park
- Location: Phitsanulok, Loei Provinces, Thailand
- Coordinates: 16°58′36″N 101°02′24″E
- Area: 307 km^{2} (119 sq mi)
- Established: July 26, 1984
- Visitors: 289,210 (in 2019)
- Governing body: Department of National Parks, Wildlife and Plant Conservation

Phu Hin Rong Kla National Park (Thai: อุทยานแห่งชาติภูหินร่องกล้า, RTGS: Utthayan Haeng Chat Phu Hin Rong Kla) is a national park located in the Loei and Phitsanulok Provinces of Thailand. The protected area is located in the forested mountains of the Luang Prabang Range close to the border with Laos and is part of the Luang Prabang montane rain forests ecoregion. The park was the base of operations of the long fight of Thai combatant in communist war of Thailand.

== Geography ==
Phu Hin Rong Kla National Park is located 50 kilometres (31 mi) north of Phetchabun town and 80 kilometres (50 mi) east of Phitsanulok town in the Nakhon Thai district of Phitsanulok Province and Dan Sai district of Loei Province with an area of 191,875 rai ~ 307 square kilometres (119 sq mi) and is neighbouring Khao Kho National Park to the southeast.
There are four types of forest, namely mixed deciduous forest, dry dipterocarp forest, hill evergreen forest and conifer forest. High mountains in the Phetchabun Mountains include: Phu Hin Rong Kla, Phu Khi Thao, Phu Phaeng Ma, the highest peak with 1,820 metres (5,970 ft) is Phu Man Khao and second tallest with 1,664 metres (5,459 ft) is Phu Lomlo. There are many streams such as: Huai Lam Nam Sai and Huai Luang Yai.

== History ==
Between 1968 and 1972, the area was the scene of fighting between Thai communist insurgents and the Royal Thai Armed Forces. Due to the difficult terrain, it was initially impossible to achieve success against the communists and tactics had to be changed. The military were able to convince the Hmong community present around the area to cooperate with the Thai government. This worked out perfectly and the communist insurgents surrendered without further bloodshed.

A survey was set up of Phu Hin Rong Kla forest in the area of Bo Pho subdistrict, Noen Phoem subdistrict and Ban Yaeng subdistrict, Nakhon Thai district, Phitsanulok province and Kok Ssathon subdistrict, Dan Sai district, Loei province in February 1983. Later the Royal Forest Department proposed to include Phu Hin Rong Kla in the system of national parks on March 15, 1983. Phu Hin Rong Kla was declared the 48th national park on July 26, 1984. Since 2002 this national park has been managed by region 11 (Phitsanulok)

== Climate ==
The park is generally cool all year round, with temperatures rarely rising above 25 °C (77 °F). The temperature occasionally drops below freezing.

== Flora ==
Plant species include:

- Anisoptera costata
- Anneslea fragrans
- Arecaceae spp.
- Betula alnoides
- Calamus rotang
- Chukrasia velutina
- Cinnamomum cassia
- Dacrycarpus imbricatus
- Dacrydium elatum
- Dalbergia oliveri
- Dipterocarpus alatus
- Dipterocarpus obtusifolius
- Dipterocarpus tuberculatus
- Eugenia cumini
- Hopea ferrea
- Hopea odorata
- Lithocarpus sootepensis
- Pinus kesiya
- Poaceae spp.
- Schima wallichii
- Schleichera oleosa
- Shorea obtusa
- Shorea roxburghii
- Shorea siamensis

Orchids species include:

- Dendrobium crystallinum
- Dendrobium infundibulum
- Dendrolirium lasiopetalum
- Phalaenopsis pulcherrima

== Fauna ==
At the present, humans come and settle down so there are less wild animals in the national park.
The number of sightings in the park are:
Nine species of mammals, include:

- Asian black bear
- Asian golden cat
- Barking deer
- Finlayson's squirrel
- Hog badger
- Indochinese serow
- Leopard
- Leopard cat
- Wild boar

The park has some 260 species of birds, of which some 190 species of passerine from 42 families, represented by one species:

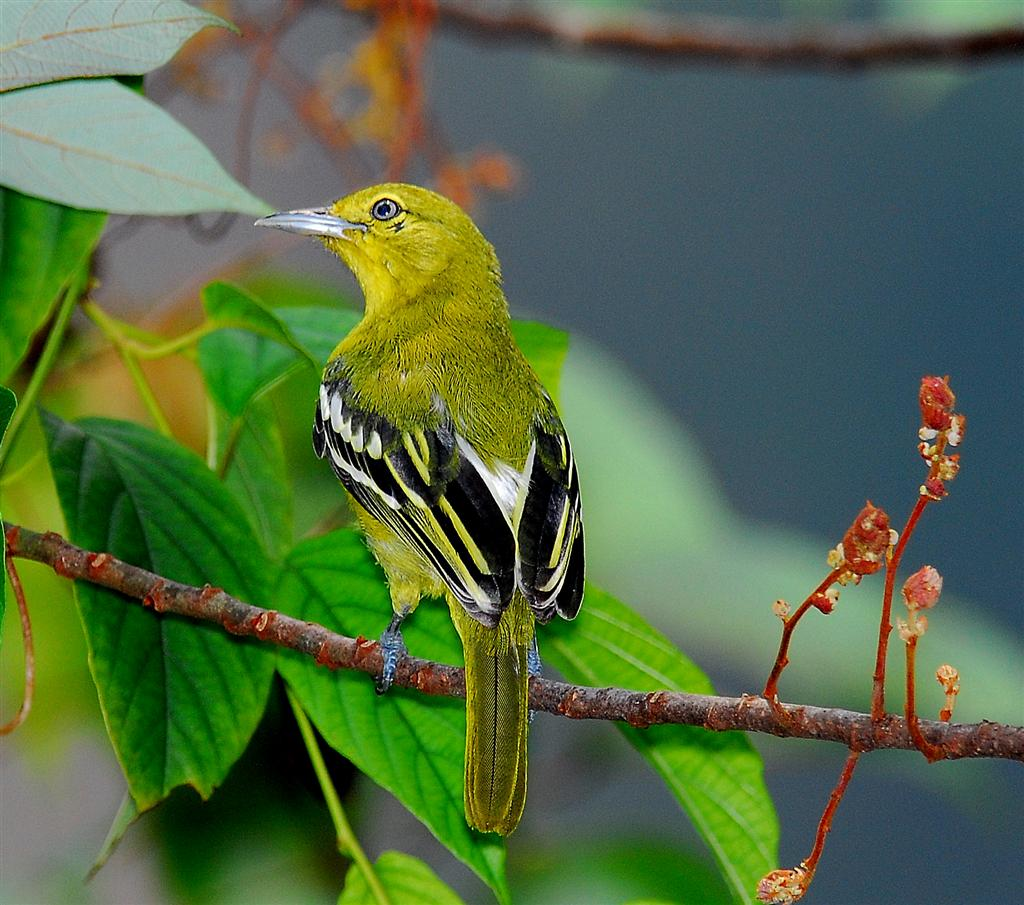
Common iora

- Ashy woodswallow
- Asian fairy-bluebird
- Bar-winged flycatcher-shrike
- Black-eared shrike-babbler
- Black-naped monarch
- Black-naped oriole
- Blue pitta
- Bronzed drongo
- Brown-cheeked fulvetta
- Chestnut-capped babbler
- Chestnut-eared bunting
- Common iora
- Common myna
- Common rosefinch
- Common tailorbird
- Dusky crag martin
- Eurasian tree sparrow
- Green cochoa
- Grey-headed canary-flycatcher
- Indochinese cuckooshrike
- Lanceolated warbler
- Long-tailed broadbill
- Long-tailed shrike
- Orange-bellied leafbird
- Oriental magpie-robin
- Oriental white-eye
- Pygmy cupwing
- Radde's warbler
- Red-throated pipit
- Rufous treepie
- Scarlet-backed flowerpecker
- Silver-eared mesia
- Slaty-bellied tesia
- Spotted Babbler
- Spotted munia
- Thick-billed warbler
- Velvet-fronted nuthatch
- White-throated fantail
- Yellow-bellied sunbird
- Yellow-cheeked tit
- Yellow-eyed babbler
- Yellow-vented bulbul

and some 70 species of non-passerine from 21 families, represented by one species:

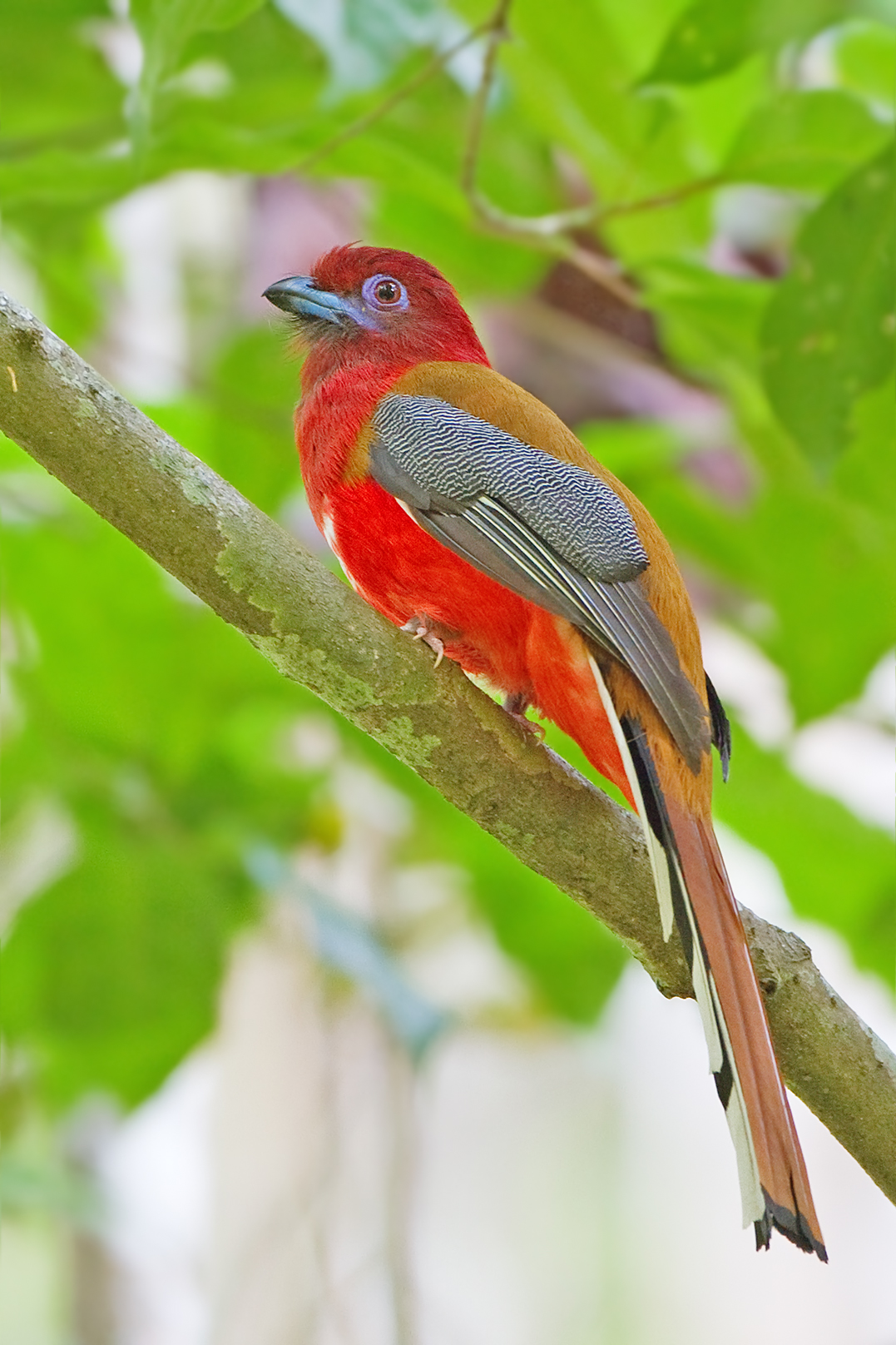
Red-headed trogon

- Asian openbill
- Asian barred owlet
- Barred buttonquail
- Black eagle
- Blue-bearded bee-eater
- Chinese pond heron
- Common flameback
- Common kestrel
- Common kingfisher
- Crested treeswift
- Eurasian hoopoe
- Great barbet
- Greater coucal
- Hodgson's frogmouth
- Indochinese roller
- Large-tailed nightjar
- Mountain imperial pigeon
- Pacific swift
- Red-headed trogon
- Red-wattled lapwing
- Siamese fireback

Eighteen species of reptiles from four families, represented by one species:

- Banded wolf snake
- Barred flying dragon
- Big-headed turtle
- Gumprecht's green pitviper

Fifteen species of amphibians from five families, represented by one species:

- Black-striped frog
- Heymon's narrow-mouthed frog
- Small spadefoot toad
- Somsak's newt
- Taylor's tree frog

== Places ==
- Lan Hin Taek (ลานหินแตก) - a big broken stone sheet that looks similar to splitting land. It is covered with orchids, ferns, mosses, lichens and seasonal flowers.
- Lan Hin Pum (ลานหินปุ่ม) - natural rock formations.
- Namtok Man Daeng (น้ำตกหมันแดง) - a 32-tiered waterfall of the Man creek that flows throughout the year.
- Namtok Romklao and Pharadon (น้ำตกร่มเกล้า-ภราดร) - waterfalls.
- Namtok Pha Lat and Tat Fa (น้ำตกผาลาด-ตาดฟ้า) - waterfalls.
- Namtok Huai Khamin Noi (น้ำตกห้วยขมิ้นน้อย) - a waterfall
- Pha Chu Thong (พาชูธง) - a cliff
- Thailand-Communism museum.

== Effect of human presence ==
Much of the forest was damaged and much of the wildlife was killed or fled to safer areas during a period when the region was used as a battlefield between the Thai government and the communists.

== Location ==
Phu Hin Rong Kla National Park in overview PARO 11 (Phitsanulok)

6) Phu Hin Rong Kla National Park in overview PARO 11 (Phitsanulok)

	National park			1	Khao Kho
2	Khwae Noi	3	Lam Nam Nan	4	Nam Nao
5	Namtok Chat Trakan	6	Phu Hin Rong Kla	7	Phu Soi Dao
8	Tat Mok	9	Thung Salaeng Luang	10	Ton Sak Yai
	Wildlife sanctuary				
11	Mae Charim	12	Nam Pat	13	Phu Khat
14	Phu Miang-Phu Thong	15	Phu Pha Daeng	16	Tabo-Huai Yai

== See also ==
- List of national parks in Thailand
- DNP - Phu Hin Rong Kla National Park
- List of Protected Areas Regional Offices of Thailand
