= Phu Soi Dao National Park =

National park in Thailand

- IUCN category II (national park)
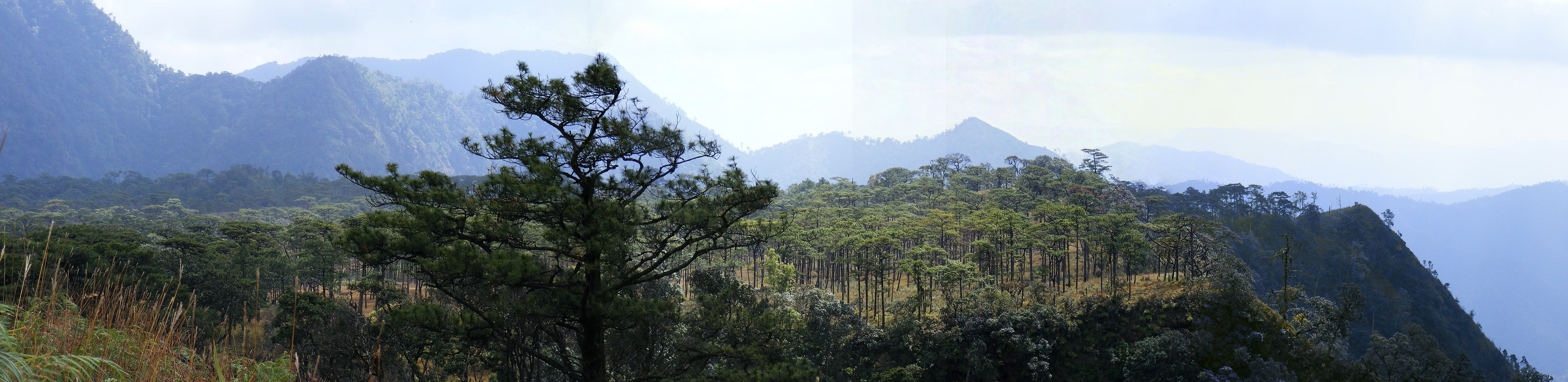
- Phu Soi Dao National park

- Location within Thailand
- Location: Uttaradit, Phitsanulok Provinces, Thailand
- Coordinates: 17°44′N 101°0′E
- Area: 340 km^{2} (130 sq mi)
- Established: May 28, 2008
- Visitors: 19,706 (in 2019)
- Governing body: Department of National Parks, Wildlife and Plant Conservation

Phu Soi Dao National Park (Thai: อุทยานแห่งชาติภูสอยดาว, RTGS: Utthayan Haeng Chat Phu Soi Dao) named after 2,120 metres (6,960 ft) high Phu Soi Dao mountain, is a protected area at the southern end of the Luang Prabang Range in the Thai/Lao border area, on the Thai side of the range. It is located in Ban Khok and Nam Pat Districts of Uttaradit Province and Chat Trakan District of Phitsanulok Province. The park was established as Thailand's 109th national park in 2008.

== Topography ==
The park is bordered by Laos PDR for a length of about 60 kilometres (37 mi) to the east and is up to 10 kilometres (6.2 mi) wide at its widest point and is abutting Phu Miang-Phu Thong Wildlife Sanctuary to the southwest and neighbouring Nam Pat Wildlife Sanctuary to the west. Landscape is mostly covered by mountains and forests (85%) and some small plains (15%), the height ranges from 500 metres (1,600 ft) to 2,100 metres (6,900 ft). Phu Soi Dao summit is with 2,120 metres (6,960 ft) the fifth highest in Thailand. There are mixed deciduous forest, dry dipterocarp forest, hill evergreen forest and conifer forest. Several rivers have their source within the park, including Pat and Kwae Noi rivers.

== Climate ==
The park is generally cool all year round. Average high temperature is 35.0 °C (95.0 °F), average lowest temperature is 13.0 °C (55.4 °F), average mean temperature is 27.0 °C (80.6 °F). Rainy season is from May to October, average rainfall is 1,334 millimetres (52.5 in)/year. Winter is from November to February and summer is from April to June.

== History ==
A survey was set up in November 1990, with an area of only 32 square kilometres (12 sq mi). In 1992 the area was extended to 78 square kilometres (30 sq mi). In August 1993 Phu Soi Dao National Park was proposed, with the inclusion of Phu Soi Dao waterfall. On May 28, 2008, Phu Soi Dao National Park, including Nam Pat forest and Phu Soi Dao forest, with an area of 212,633 rai ~ 340 square kilometres (130 sq mi) was declared the 109th national park. Since 2002 this national park has been managed by region 11 (Phitsanulok).

== Flora ==
Plant species include:

- Afzelia xylocarpa
- Anisoptera costata
- Betula alnoides
- Dalbergia oliveri
- Dillenia spp.
- Dipterocarpus obtusifolius
- Garuga pinnata
- Hopea odorata
- Lagerstroemia calyculata
- Lannea coromandelica
- Magnolia champaca
- Phyllanthus emblica
- Pinus kesiya
- Pterocarpus macrocarpus
- Quercus spp.
- Schima wallichii
- Shorea obtusa
- Shorea roxburghii
- Shorea siamensis
- Spondias mombin
- Terminalia chebula
- Tetrameles nudiflora
- Toona ciliata
- Vitex pinnata
- Xylia xylocarpa

Flowering plant species include:

- Aeginetia indica
- Aeschynanthus andersonii
- Alpinia galanga
- Arachnothryx spp.
- Hibiscus syriacus
- Melastoma malabathricum
- Murdannia gigantea
- Poaceae spp.
- Xyris bancana
- Xyris complanata
- Zingiber officinale

Orchids species include:

- Dendrobium christyanum
- Paphiopedilum villosum
- Papilionanthe teres
- Spathoglottis affinis

Carnivorous plant species include:

- Drosera peltata
- Utricularia bifida
- Utricularia phusoidaoensis
- Utricularia spinomarginata

== Fauna ==
In the park are the following mammals:

- Asian black bear
- Asian palm civet
- Barking deer
- Burmese hare
- Mainland serow
- Malayan porcupine
- Sambar deer
- Wild boar

Birds, the park has some 190 species, of which 130 species of passerine from 32 families, represented by one species:

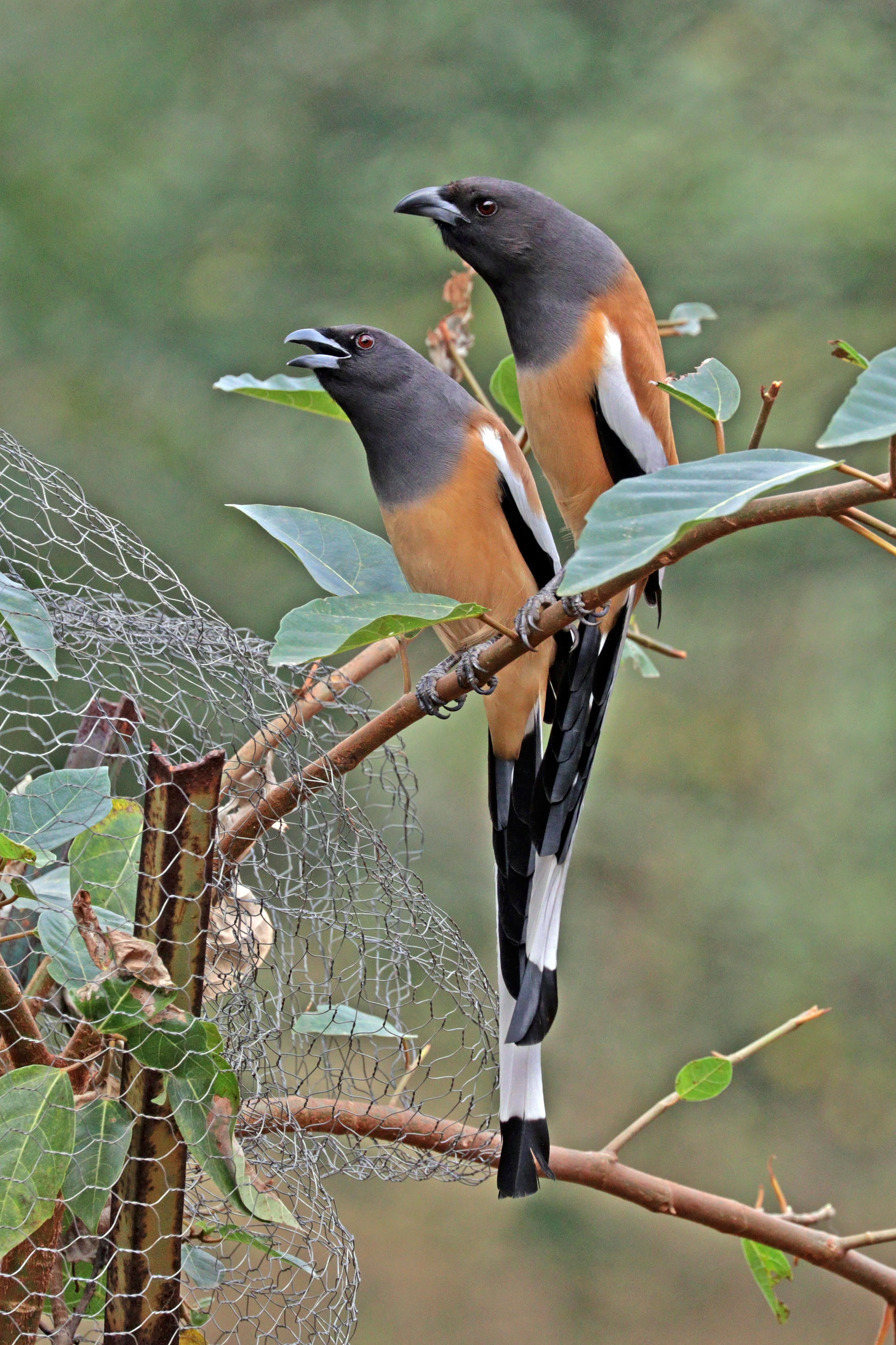
Rufous treepie

- Ashy woodswallow
- Barn swallow
- Bar-winged flycatcher-shrike
- Black-headed bulbul
- Black-throated sunbird
- Blyth's paradise flycatcher
- Common hill myna
- Common rosefinch
- Common tailorbird
- Golden babbler
- Great iora
- Grey-backed shrike
- Grey-headed canary-flycatcher
- Hair-crested drongo
- Mountain tailorbird
- Olive-backed pipit
- Orange-headed thrush
- Orange-bellied leafbird
- Rufous treepie
- Sapphire flycatcher
- Scarlet minivet
- Short-tailed parrotbill
- Streaked wren-babbler
- Sulphur-breasted warbler
- Swinhoe's white-eye
- Velvet-fronted nuthatch
- White-bellied erpornis
- White-necked laughingthrush
- White-rumped munia
- White-throated fantail
- Yellow-cheeked tit
- Yellow-vented flowerpecker

and some 60 species of non-passerine from 14 families, represented by one species:

- Asian barred owlet
- Blue-bearded bee-eater
- Blue-throated barbet
- Greater coucal
- House swift
- Indochinese roller
- Large-tailed nightjar
- Mountain hawk-eagle
- Oriental hobby
- Red collared dove
- Red-headed trogon
- Red junglefowl
- Red-wattled lapwing
- Stripe-breasted woodpecker

And also reptiles:

- Bengal monitor
- King cobra
- Reticulated python
- Softshell turtle

== Places ==
- Namtok Phu Soi Dao - a 5-tiered waterfall.
- Lan Son Phu Soi Dao - a broad plain, 640 hectares (1,600 acres) at 1,630 metres (5,350 ft) elevation, Thailand's largest field of "Crested Naga" flowers.
- Namtok Sai Thip - a 7 tiered waterfall.
- Namtok Pha Chan and Moss - two small waterfalls.
- Yod Phu Soi Dao - the summit, a flat plain, 160 hectares (400 acres) at 2,120 metres (6,960 ft) elevation.

== Location ==
Phu Soi Dao National Park in overview PARO 11 (Phitsanulok)

7) Phu Soi Dao National Park in overview PARO 11 (Phitsanulok)

	National park			1	Khao Kho
2	Khwae Noi	3	Lam Nam Nan	4	Nam Nao
5	Namtok Chat Trakan	6	Phu Hin Rong Kla	7	Phu Soi Dao
8	Tat Mok	9	Thung Salaeng Luang	10	Ton Sak Yai
	Wildlife sanctuary				
11	Mae Charim	12	Nam Pat	13	Phu Khat
14	Phu Miang-Phu Thong	15	Phu Pha Daeng	16	Tabo-Huai Yai

== See also ==
- List of national parks in Thailand
- DNP - Phu Soi Dao National Park
- List of Protected Areas Regional Offices of Thailand
