= Namtok Chat Trakan National Park =

National park in Thailand

- IUCN category II (national park)
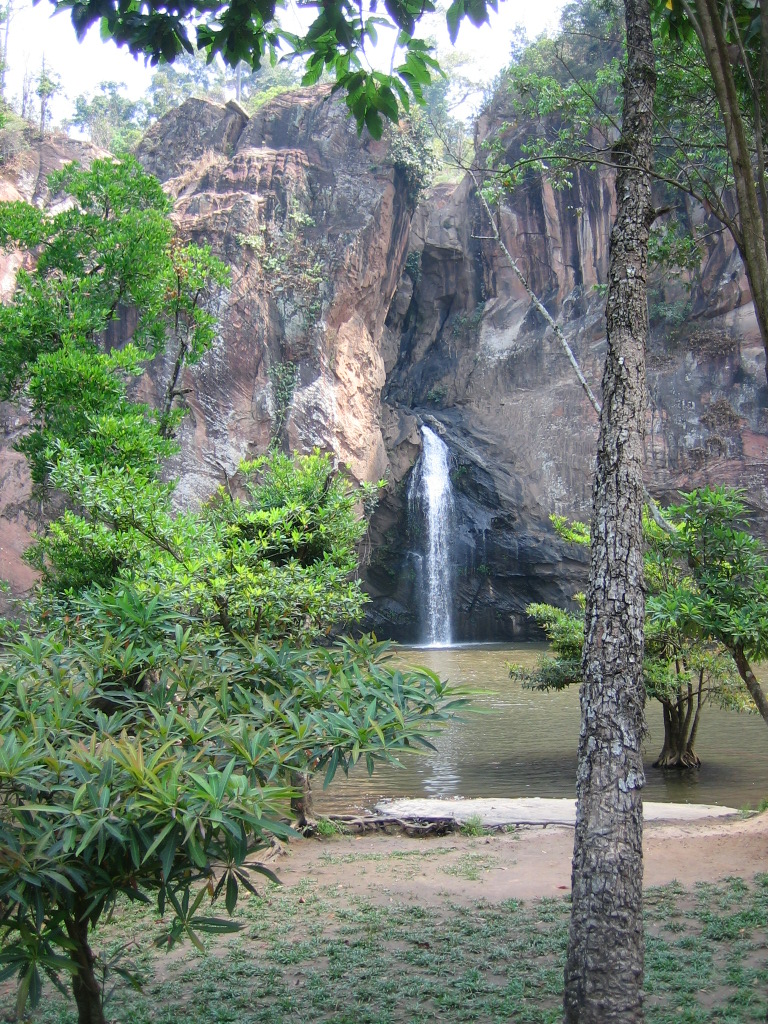
- Chat Trakan waterfall

- Location within Thailand
- Location: Phitsanulok Province, Thailand
- Coordinates: 17°09′0″N 100°50′50″E
- Area: 543 km^{2} (210 sq mi)
- Established: 2 November 1987
- Visitors: 13,033 (in 2019)
- Governing body: Department of National Parks, Wildlife and Plant Conservation

Namtok Chat Trakan National Park (Thai: อุทยานแห่งชาดิน้ำตกชาติตระการ, RTGS: Utthayan Haeng Chat Namtok Chat Trakan) is a national park located in Chat Trakan and Nakhon Thai Districts of Phitsanulok Province of Thailand, established in 1987. It encompasses Lam Kwae Noi, Daeng and Chat Trakan forests a substantial portion of Chat Trakan District.

== Topography ==
Most of the park is mountains covered with dipterocarp forest. The source of several rivers is within the park, including the Khwae Noi River and its tributary the Phak River. The area of the park is part of the Luang Prabang montane rain forests ecoregion, Phu Khai Hoi is the highest peak in the park with 1,277 metres (4,190 ft).

== Chat Trakan Waterfall ==
The Chat Trakan Waterfall, a.k.a. Pak Rong Waterfall, is located within the park. The sandy beach near the falls is suitable for swimming. Some of the cliffs near the falls are inscribed with yet unexplained rock carvings. The stream from the waterfall joins the Phak River.

== History ==
A survey called "Khao Ya Puk Forest Park" was set up, in March 1982 the name changed to "Namtok Chat Trakan Forest Park". First they surveyed areas of approximately 1,274 square kilometres (492 sq mi) for a national park. Later half of the surveyed areas should be designated as a national park. Namtok Chat Trakan, with an area of 339,375 rai ~ 543 square kilometres (210 sq mi), was proposed for inclusion in the national parks system in 1985. Namtok Chat Trakan was declared the 55th national park on 2 November 1987. Since 2002 this national park has been managed by region 11 (Phitsanulok)

== Climate ==
Summer is between March and May, with temperatures around 25–29 °C (77–84 °F). Rainy season is between June and October. Winter from November till February is very cold at night.

== Flora ==
Plants in the park are:

- Afzelia xylocarpa
- Anisoptera costata
- Arecaceae spp.
- Diospyros spp.
- Dipterocarpus alatus
- Dipterocarpus obtusifolius
- Lagerstroemia sp.
- Lithocarpus sp.
- Mangifera indica
- Poaceae spp.
- Pterocarpus macrocarpus
- Calamus rotang
- Shorea obtusa
- Shorea roxburghii
- Shorea siamensis
- Xylia xylocarpa

== Fauna ==
In the park are the following mammals:

- Barking deer
- Black giant squirrel
- Chipmunk
- Jungle fowl
- Kanchil
- Northern treeshrew
- Wild boar

Birds, the park has some 60 species, of which 44 species of passerine from 19 families, represented by one species:

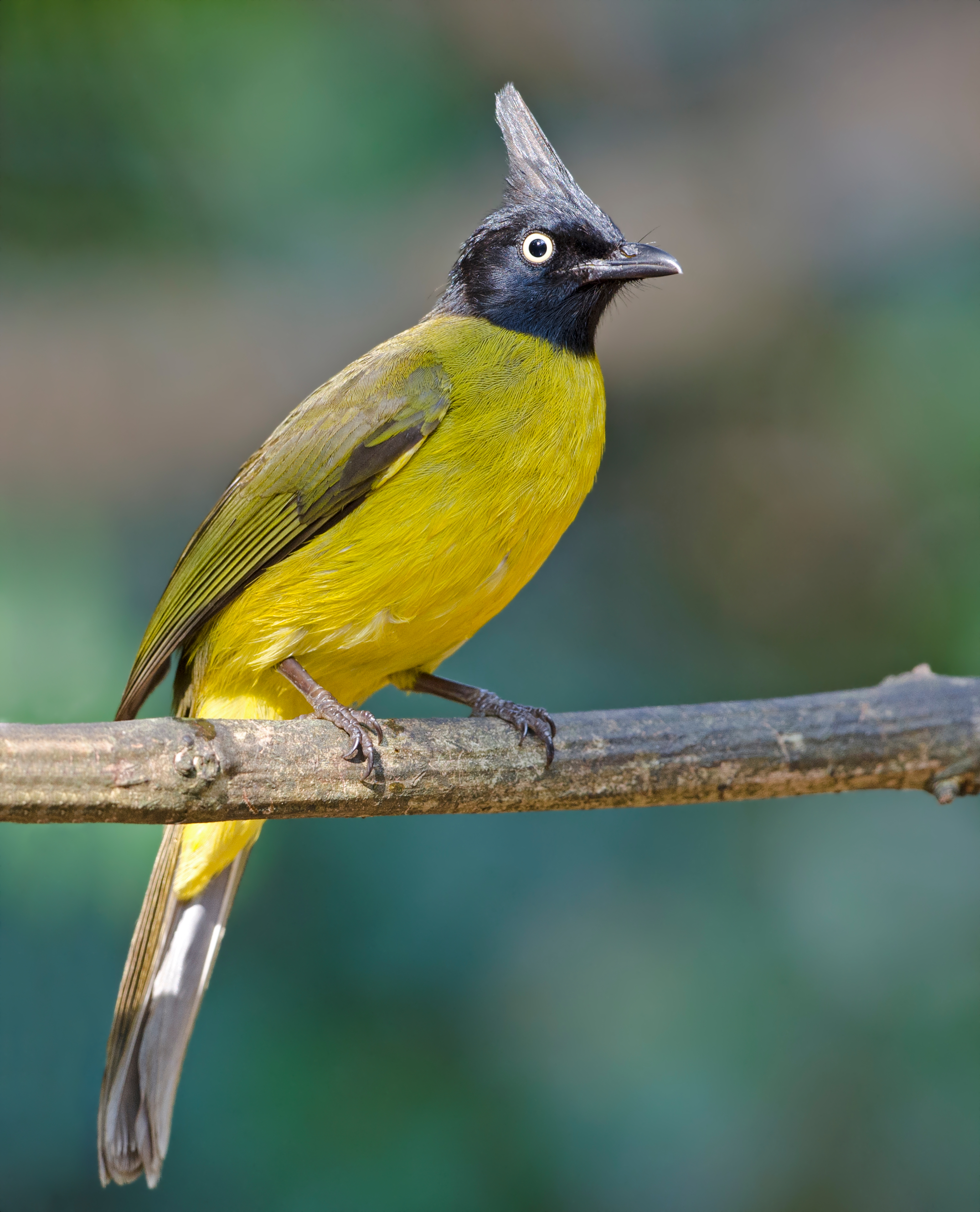
Black-crested bulbul

- Ashy woodswallow
- Barn swallow
- Black drongo
- Black-headed bulbul
- Black-naped oriole
- Blue-winged leafbird
- Brown-throated sunbird
- Chestnut-tailed starling
- Dark-necked tailorbird
- Eurasian tree sparrow
- Grey-crowned warbler
- Grey-headed canary-flycatcher
- Grey wagtail
- Indochinese blue flycatcher
- Pin-striped tit-babbler
- Rosy minivet
- Scaly-breasted munia
- Scarlet-backed flowerpecker
- White-bellied erpornis

and some 16 species of non-passerine from 9 families, represented by one species:

- Asian barred owlet
- Asian openbill
- Asian palm swift
- Chinese pond heron
- Common emerald dove
- Common kingfisher
- Greater coucal
- Green-eared barbet
- Shikra

== Places ==
- Namtok Chat Trakan - 7 tiers waterfall (total distance 1,280 metres (4,200 ft).
- Namtok Na Chan - a 7 tiers waterfall.
- Namtok Pha Khu Kham - a 50 metres (160 ft) high waterfall.
- Tham Pha Kradan Lek - a cave with pre-historic carvings.
- Khao Chang Luang - a sandstone mountain.

== Location ==
Namtok Chat Trakan National Park in overview PARO 11 (Phitsanulok)

5) Namtok Chat Trakan National park in overview PARO 11 (Phitsanulok)

	National park			1	Khao Kho
2	Khwae Noi	3	Lam Nam Nan	4	Nam Nao
5	Namtok Chat Trakan	6	Phu Hin Rong Kla	7	Phu Soi Dao
8	Tat Mok	9	Thung Salaeng Luang	10	Ton Sak Yai
	Wildlife sanctuary				
11	Mae Charim	12	Nam Pat	13	Phu Khat
14	Phu Miang-Phu Thong	15	Phu Pha Daeng	16	Tabo-Huai Yai

== Gallery ==
Chat Trakan waterfall

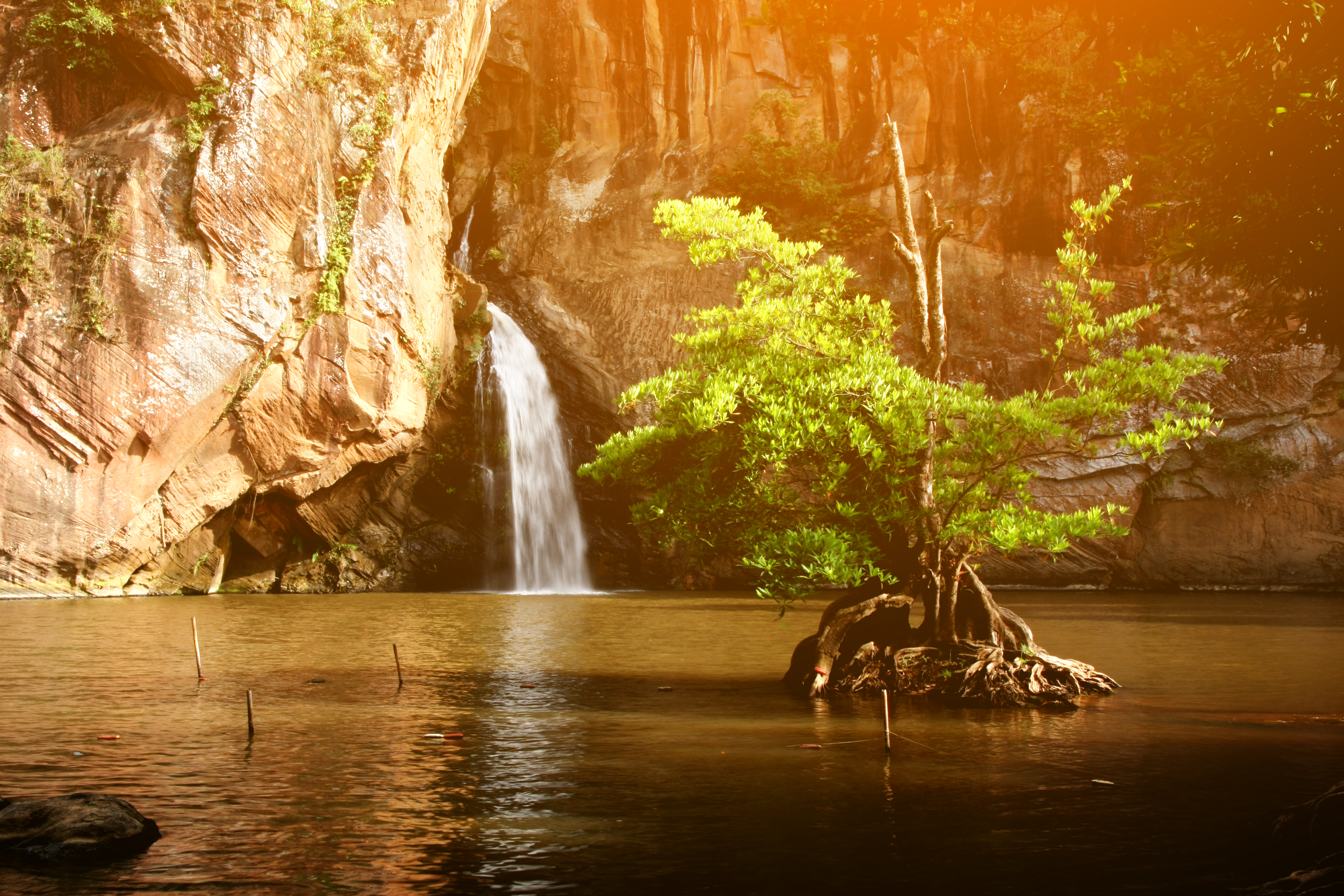

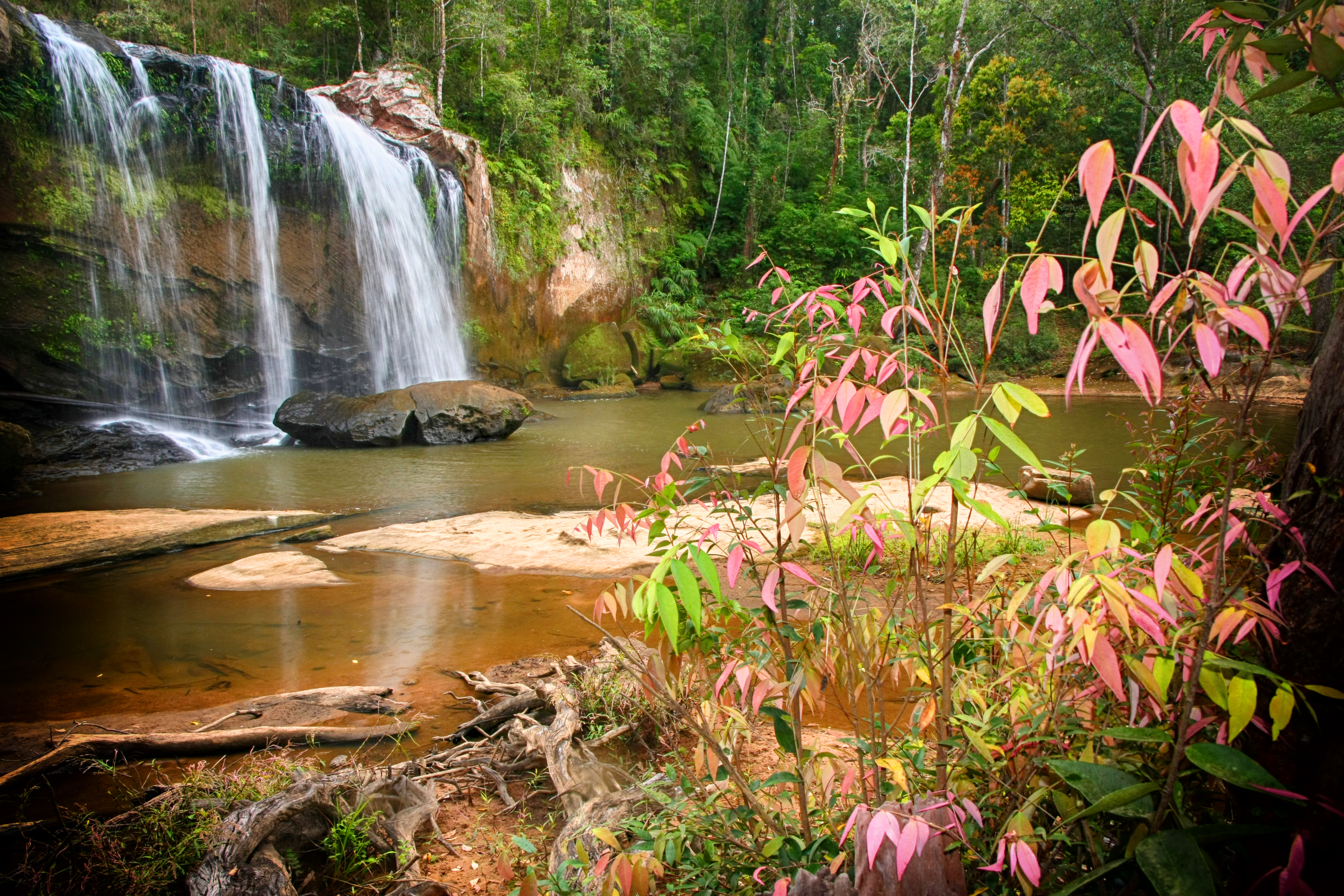

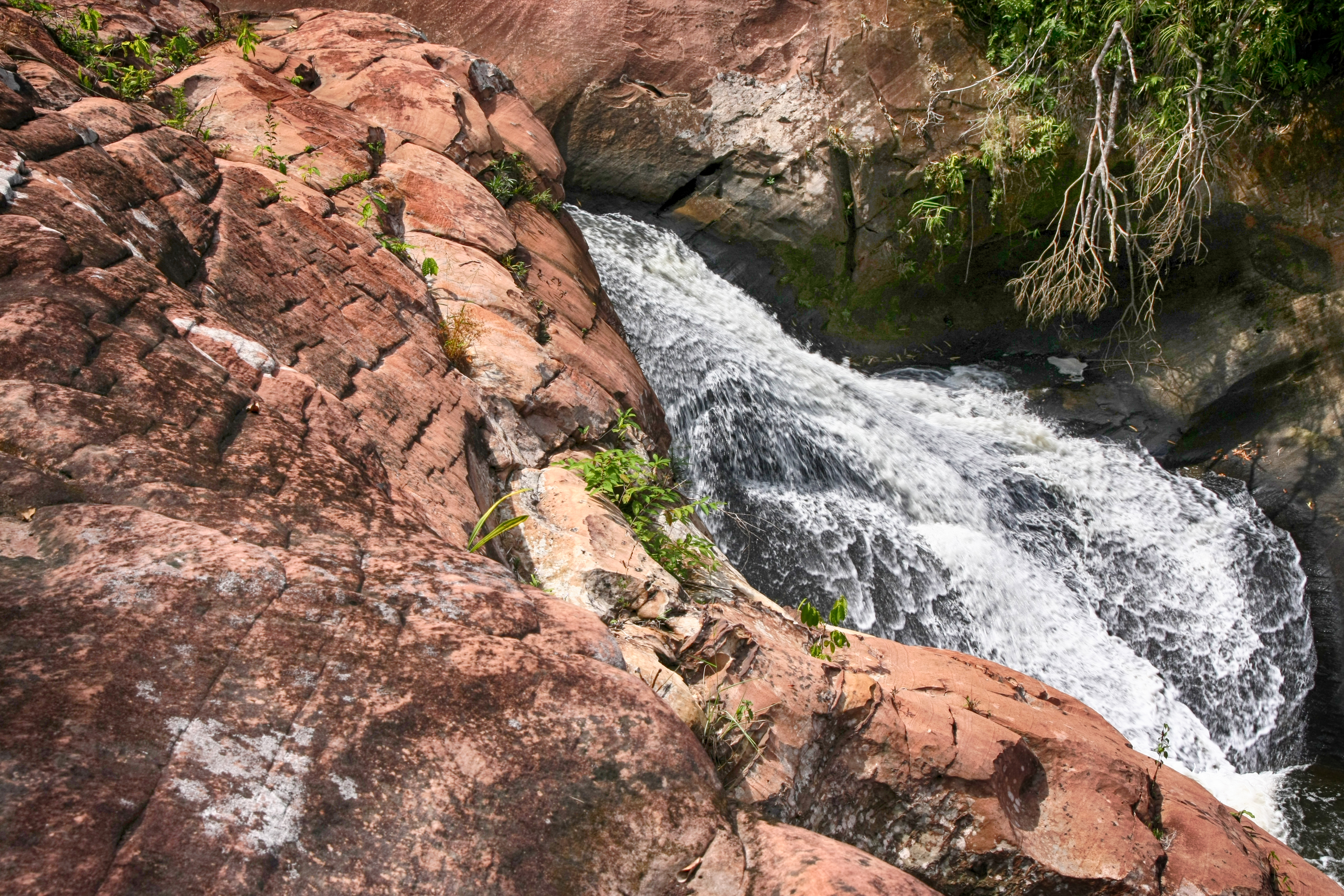

== See also ==
- List of national parks of Thailand
- DNP - Namtok Chat Trakan National Park
- List of Protected Areas Regional Offices of Thailand
