= Khwae Noi National Park =

National park in Thailand

- IUCN category II (national park)
- Location within Thailand
- Location: Phitsanulok Province, Thailand
- Coordinates: 17°05′35″N 100°37′22″E
- Area: 198 km^{2} (76 sq mi)
- Visitors: 5,692 (in 2019)
- Governing body: Department of National Parks, Wildlife and Plant Conservation(DNP)

Khwae Noi National Park (Thai: อุทยานแห่งชาติแควน้อย, RTGS: Utthayan Haeng Chat Khwae Noi) is a national park in Chat Trakan, Nakhon Thai, Wang Thong and Wat Bot districts in Phitsanulok Province, Thailand, it was formerly known as Kaeng Chet Kwae National Park.

== Topography ==
The park consists of long complex mountains and forests which also includes scenic steep valleys, rugged mountains, rocky terrain and waterfalls. It occupies 123,779 rai ~ 198 square kilometres (76 sq mi).

== Forest ==
The park contains mixed deciduous, dipterocarp, hill evergreen and dry evergreen forests. It is divided into the following forest parks:

- Kaeng Chet Khwae Forest Park
- Khwae Noi National Reserved Forest in Wat Bot district.
- Suan Miang National Reserved Forest in Chat Trakan district.
- Khao Krayang National Reserved Forest in Nakhon Thai and Wang Thong districts.

Since 2002 this park has been managed by region 11 (Phitsanulok)

== Flora and fauna ==
Plant species include:

- Afzelia xylocarpa
- Dalbergia oliveri
- Dipterocarpus alatus
- Hopea odorata
- Pterocarpus macrocarpus
- Tectona grandis
- Xylia xylocarpa

Mammal sorts include:

- Asian palm civet
- Langur
- Malayan porcupine
- Barking deer
- Wild boar

Mammals not further specified:

- Macaque
- Monkey
- Rabbit

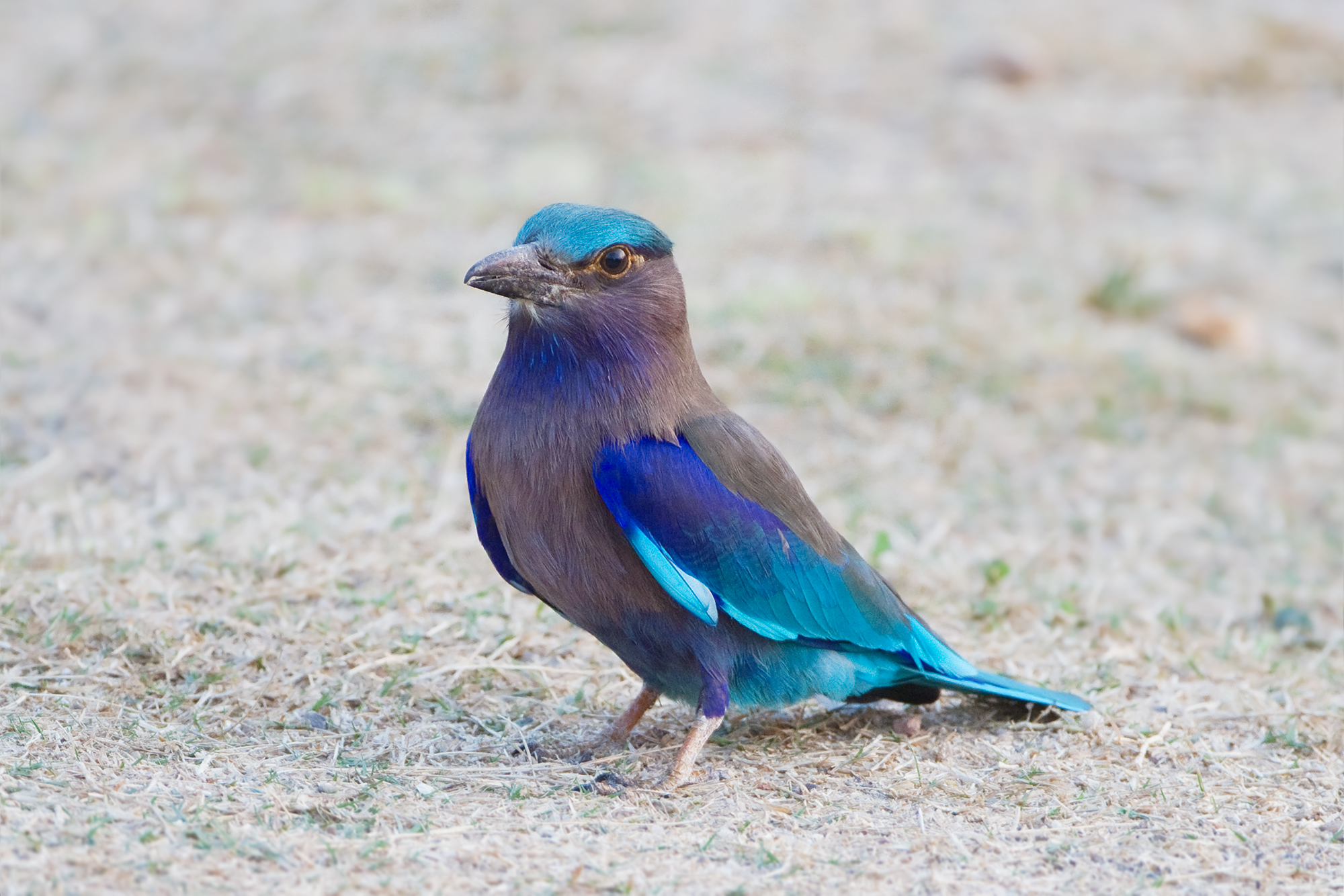
Indochinese roller

Birds, the park has some 18 species, of which 12 species of passerine from 10 families, represented by one species:

- Barn swallow
- Black-collared starling
- Black-headed bulbul
- Brown shrike
- Chestnut-capped babbler
- Hair-crested drongo
- Indochinese bush lark
- Paddyfield pipit
- Taiga flycatcher
- White-rumped munia

and some 6 species of non-passerine from 5 families, represented by one species:

- Black-winged kite
- Green-billed malkoha
- Indochinese roller
- Little egret
- White-throated kingfisher

Reptile sorts include:

- Bengal monitor

== Places ==
- Namtok Kaeng Pu Ten - a 9-tiered waterfall.
- Namtok Kaeng Suea - a 5-tiered waterfall.
- Namtok Pu Daeng Ron - a hot waterfall.
- Namtok Sam Takhian - a tiered waterfall.
- Kaeng Chet Khwae nature trail.
- Khwae Noi Bamrung Dan - a dam with a reservoir.

== Location ==
Khwae Noi National Park in overview PARO 11 (Phitsanulok)

2) Khwae Noi National park in overview PARO 11 (Phitsanulok)

	National park			1	Khao Kho
2	Khwae Noi	3	Lam Nam Nan	4	Nam Nao
5	Namtok Chat Trakan	6	Phu Hin Rong Kla	7	Phu Soi Dao
8	Tat Mok	9	Thung Salaeng Luang	10	Ton Sak Yai
	Wildlife sanctuary				
11	Mae Charim	12	Nam Pat	13	Phu Khat
14	Phu Miang-Phu Thong	15	Phu Pha Daeng	16	Tabo-Huai Yau

== See also ==
- List of national parks of Thailand
- DNP - Khwae Noi National Park
- List of Protected Areas Regional Offices of Thailand
