= Khao Kho National Park =

National park in Thailand

- อุทยานแห่งชาติเขาค้อ
- IUCN category II (national park)
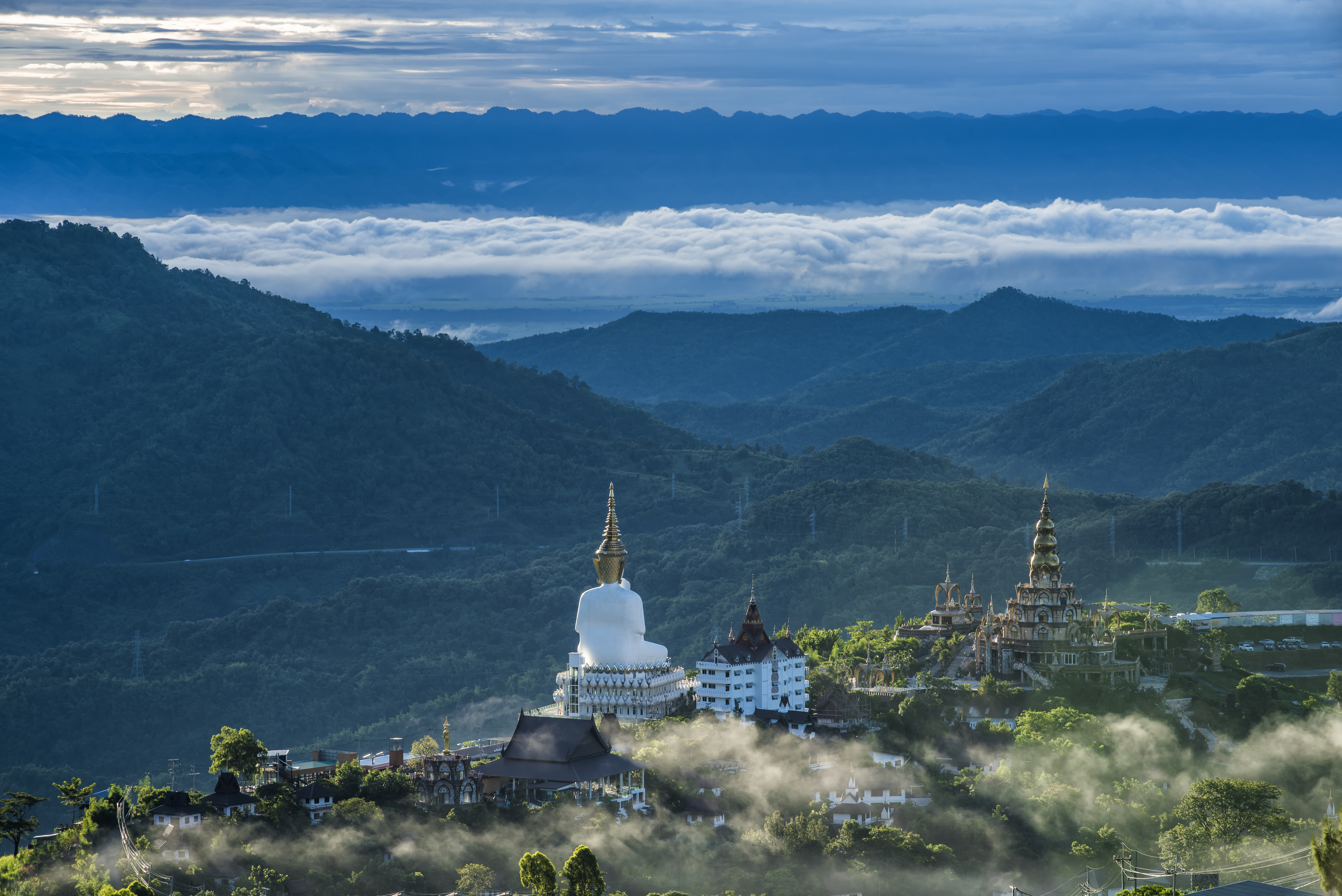
- In the foreground Wat Phra That Pha Son Kaeo

- Location within Thailand
- Location: Phetchabun Province, Thailand
- Coordinates: 16°40′00″N 100°58′00″E
- Area: 483 km^{2} (186 sq mi)
- Established: 18 May 2012
- Visitors: 33,609 (in 2019)
- Governing body: Department of National Parks, Wildlife and Plant Conservation

The Khao Kho National park (Thai: อุทยานแห่งชาดิเขาค้อ, RTGS: Utthayan Haeng Chat Khao Kho) is located in Lom Kao, Lom Sak, Khao Kho and Mueang Phetchabun districts in Thailand's Phetchabun province. The national park covers an area of 483 square kilometres (186 sq mi) and was established in 2012.

== Topography ==
Landscape is mostly covered by mountains and forests, the height ranged from 155 metres (509 ft) to 1,305 metres (4,281 ft), Khao Kha the highest point in the park. The national park is named after Khao Kho, a mesa high 1,143 metres (3,750 ft). This part of the Phetchabun mountain range is the origin of the main tributaries of the Pa Sak, Yom and Nan rivers.

== Climate ==
Weather measurement station at the Khao Kho National park collects data of temperature, relative humidity and rainfall since June 1999. The park is generally cool all year round, with rainy season around mid-May to October. Rainfall is approximately 1,425 millimetres (56.1 in)/year, with rainfall for 126 days a year. Winter is around November to mid-February. Summer is around mid-February to mid-May.

== History ==
From 1968 to 1981 the park's forest was used as a base for guerrillas of the Communist Party of Thailand. On 1 May 1995 an area of 14 km^{2} (5.4 sq mi) in the Khao Polok Lon National Forest, originally named Namtok Than Thip Forest Park, was declared as Khao Kho National Park. A survey was set up of Khok Sam Sang forest, Khao Polok Lon forest, Khao Pang Kho forest and Wang Chompu forest in the area of Lom Kao district, Lom Sak district, Khao Kho district and Mueang Phetchabun district of Phetchabun province on 16 August 2001. Later on 18 May 2012 Khao Kho National Park, with an area of 301,698 rai ~ 483 km^{2} (186 sq mi) and neighbouring Phu Hin Rong Kla National Park to the north, has been declared the 125th national park and is managed by region 11 (Phitsanulok).

== Flora ==
The park is home to deciduous dipterocarp forest or red rainforest, such as:

- Afzelia xylocarpa
- Dipterocarpus alatus
- Hopea odorata
- Wild orchid
- Pterocarpus macrocarpus
- Shorea obtusa
- Tectona grandis
- Xylia xylocarpa

== Fauna ==
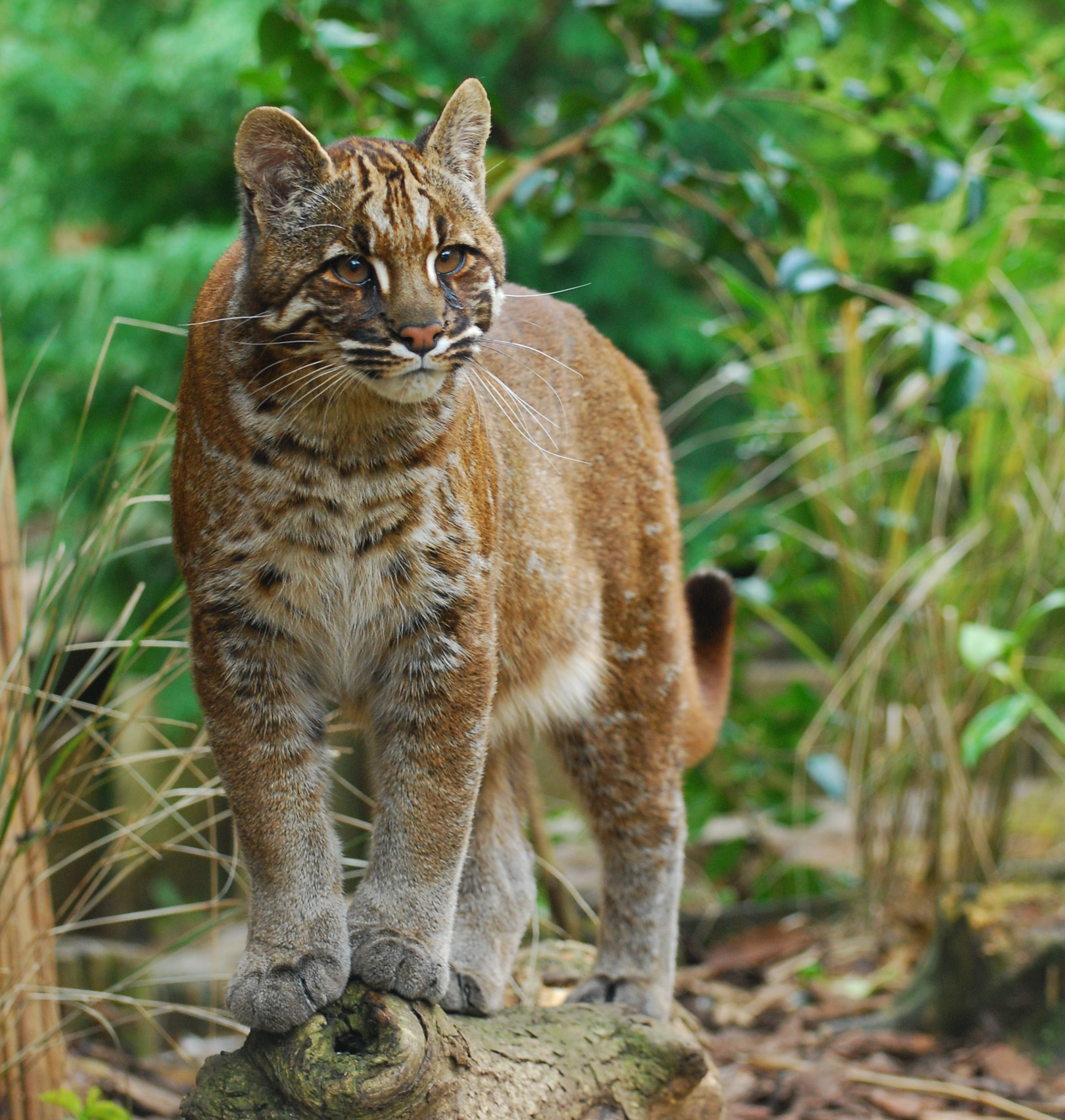
Asian golden cat

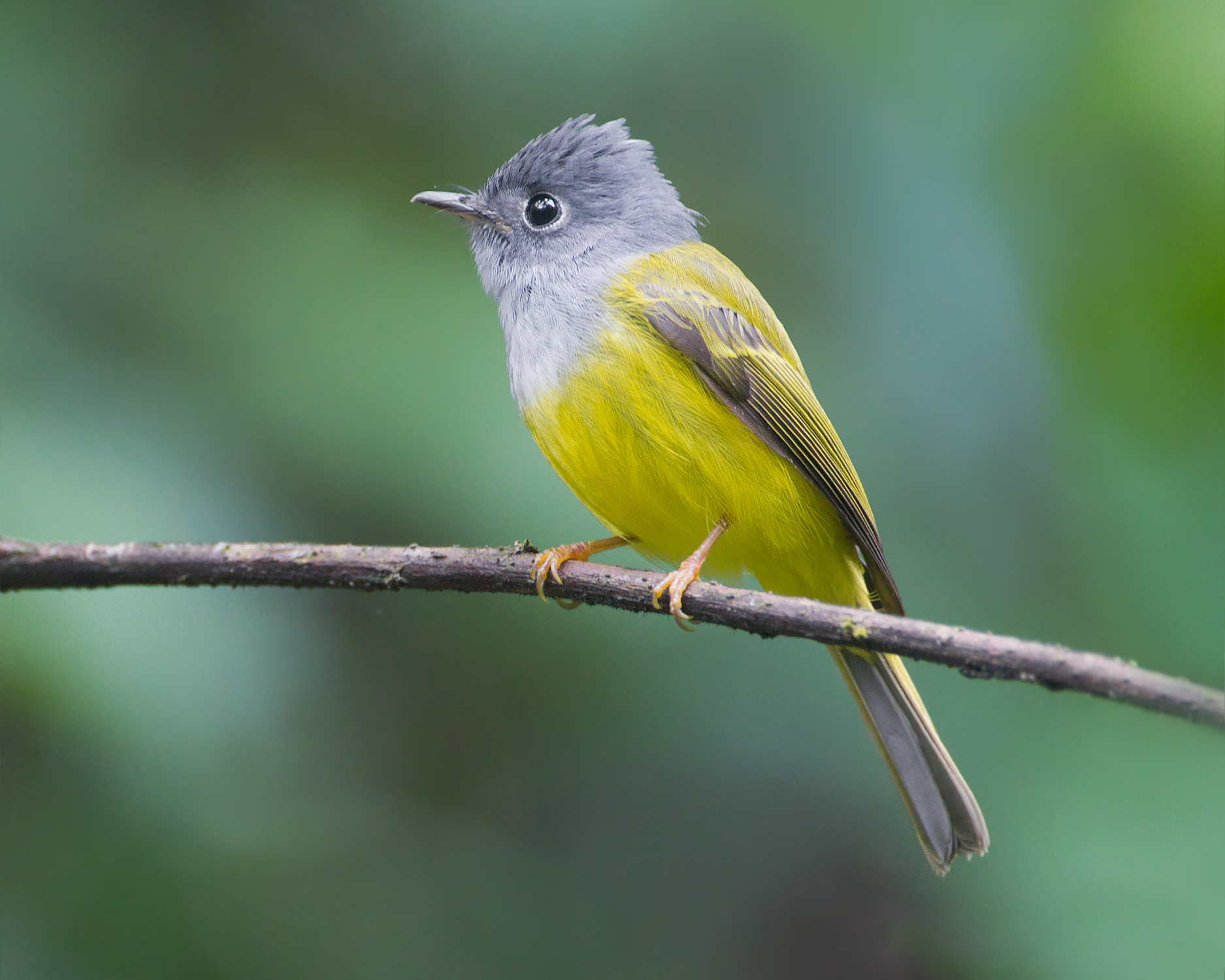
Grey-headed canary-flycatcher

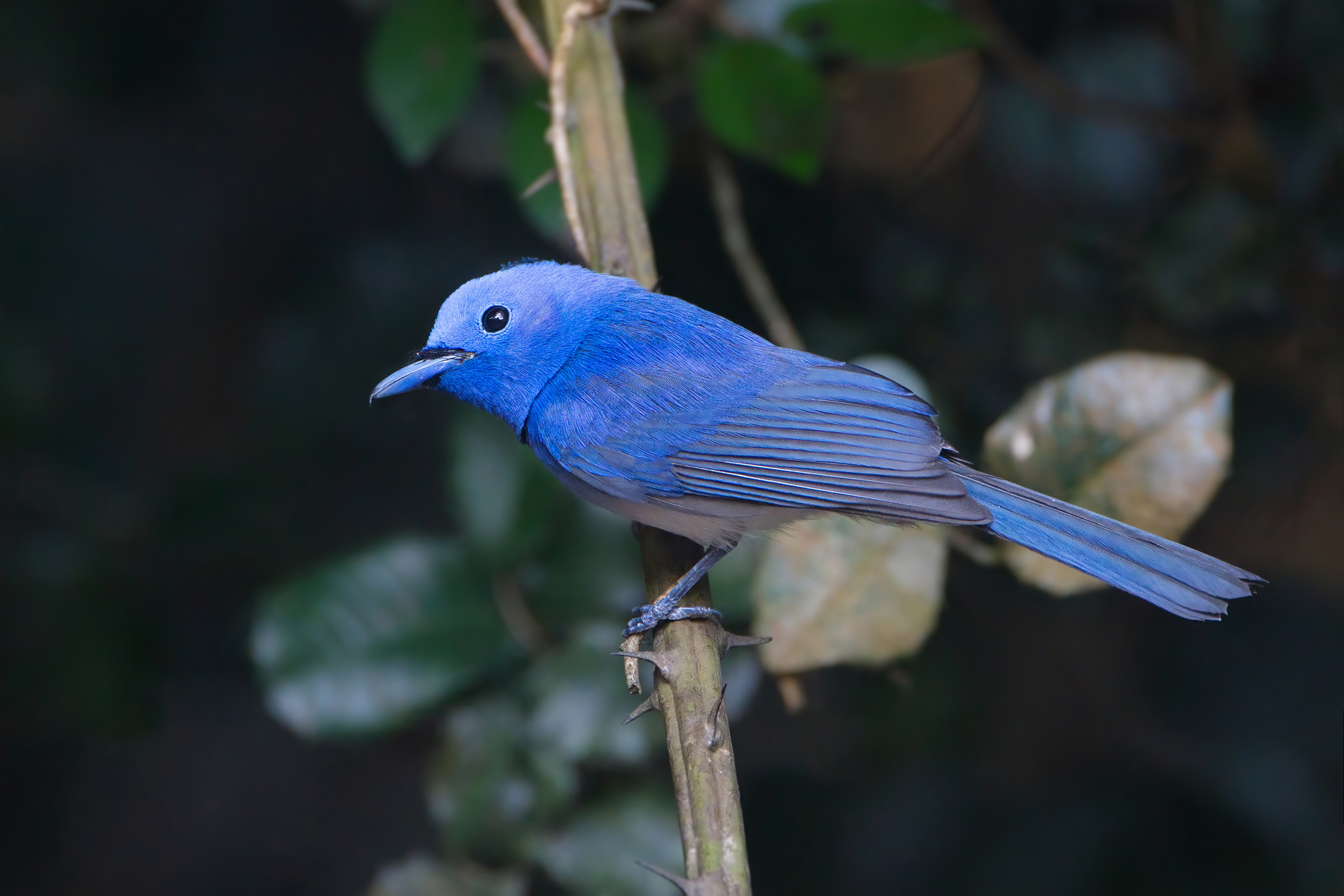
Black-naped monarch

Mammals:

- Asian elephant
- Asian golden cat
- Asian palm civet
- Burmese hare
- Chevrotain
- Flying lemur
- Porcupine
- Slow loris
- Wild boar

Birds:

The park has some 80 species of birds of which 60 species of passerine from 20 families include:

- Ashy woodswallow
- Asian fairy-bluebird
- Barn swallow
- Bar-winged flycatcher-shrike
- Black-crested bulbul
- Black-naped monarch
- Bronzed drongo
- Common green magpie
- Common iora
- Common myna
- Common tailorbird
- Grey-backed shrike
- Grey-headed canary-flycatcher
- Grey wagtail
- Hainan blue flycatcher
- Indian white-eye
- Olive-backed sunbird
- Scarlet-backed flowerpecker
- Scarlet minivet
- Slender-billed oriole
- White-browed scimitar babbler
- Yellow-browed warbler

and some 20 species of non-passerine from 9 families, which include:

- Asian barred owlet
- Bay woodpecker
- Blue-throated barbet
- Eurasian hoopoe
- Green-billed malkoha
- Mountain imperial pigeon
- Oriental honey buzzard
- Silver-backed needletail
- Vernal hanging parrot

Reptiles:

- Bengal monitor

Butterflies, there is a wide variety of butterflies.

== Places ==
- Namtok Tat Fa - largest waterfall in Khao Kho national park.
- Namtok Than Thip - 26 m (85 ft) high waterfall.
- Namtok Huai Yai - 20 m (66 ft) high waterfall.
- Namtok Khan Bandai - a 20-tiered waterfall.
- Namtok Wang Nam Rin - 5 m (16 ft) high waterfall.
- Namtok Pha Lat - a waterfall off a cliff.
- Namtok Kaeng Liang Pha - waterfall with a large stone yard.
- Tham Yai Nam Ko - a cave.
- Khao Kho royal palace - temporarily residence from late King Bhumidol Adulyadaj (1985).
- Wat Phra That Pha Son Kaeo - temple with five large sitting Buddha images in line (2004).
- Khao Kho wind farm - wind farm with 24 wind turbines each 110 m (360 ft) tall.

== Location ==
Khao Kho National Park in overview PARO 11 (Phitsanulok)

1) Khao Kho National Park in overview PARO 11 (Phitsanulok)

	National park			1	Khao Kho
2	Khwae Noi	3	Lam Nam Nan	4	Nam Nao
5	Namtok Chat Trakan	6	Phu Hin Rong Kla	7	Phu Soi Dao
8	Tat Mok	9	Thung Salaeng Luang	10	Ton Sak Yai
	Wildlife sanctuary				
11	Mae Charim	12	Nam Pat	13	Phu Khat
14	Phu Miang-Phu Thong	15	Phu Pha Daeng	16	Tabo-Huai Yai

== See also ==
- List of national parks in Thailand
- DNP - Khao Kho National Park
- List of Protected Areas Regional Offices of Thailand
