= Tat Mok National Park =

National park in Thailand

- อุทยานแห่งชาติตาดหมอก
- IUCN category II (national park)
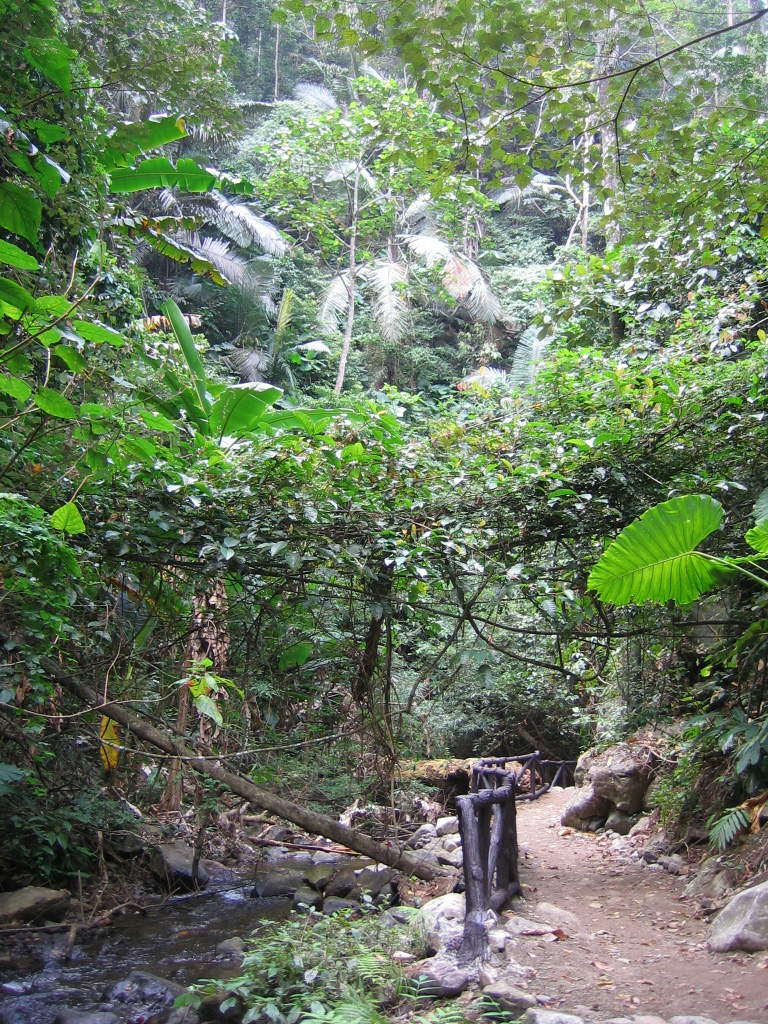
- Near Tat Mok waterfall

- Location within Thailand
- Location: Phetchabun Province, Thailand
- Nearest city: Phetchabun
- Coordinates: 16°28′5″N 101°23′25″E
- Area: 290 km^{2} (110 sq mi)
- Established: 30 October 1998
- Visitors: 17,872 (in 2019)
- Governing body: Department of National Parks, Wildlife and Plant Conservation

Tat Mok National Park (Thai: อุทยานแห่งชาติตาดหมอก, RTGS: Utthayan Haeng Chat Tat Mok) is a national park in Phetchabun Province, Thailand. Established on 30 October 1998, it is the 87th national park in Thailand. Both park and the waterfall are named after Tat Mok Mountains.

== Geography ==
Tat Mok National Park is about 37 kilometres (20 mi) east of Phetchabun in Mueang District. The park's area covers 181,250 rai ~ 290 square kilometres (110 sq mi).
The national park is abutting Phu Pha Daeng Wildlife Sanctuary and connected by Nam Nao National Park to the north, abutting Phu Khiao Wildlife Sanctuary to the east and abutting Tabo-Huai Yai Wildlife Sanctuary to the south. The park's streams and waterfalls provide the main source for the Pa Sak and Chi Rivers.

== History ==
In mid-1991 a survey was set up, a beautiful waterfall was found suitable for renovation into a tourist attraction. Later in 1995, the Royal Forest Department requested additional information so that the Tabo forest and Huai Yai forest area could become a national park. Tat Mok was declared the 87th National Park on 30 October 1998. Since 2002 this national park has been managed by region 11 (Phitsanulok)

== Flora ==
The park features forest types, including mixed deciduous, deciduous dipterocarp, dry evergreen and hill evergreen forest. Plants include:

- Dipterocarpus alatus
- Hopea odorata
- Lagerstroemia calyculata
- Lithocarpus spp.
- Poaceae spp.
- Pterocarpus macrocarpus
- Tectona grandis
- Xylia xylocarpa

== Fauna ==
In the park are the following mammals:

- Asian elephant
- Assam macaque
- Bengal slow loris
- Gaur
- Golden jackal
- Grey-bellied squirrel
- Malayan porcupine
- Northern treeshrew
- Sambar deer
- Wild boar

The park has approximately 170 species of birds, of which some 110 species of passerine from 33 families, represented by one species:

- Ashy woodswallow
- Asian fairy-bluebird
- Bar-winged flycatcher-shrike
- Black-naped monarch
- Black-naped oriole
- Blue-winged leafbird
- Brown shrike
- Common hill myna
- Common iora
- Crimson sunbird
- Dark-sided thrush
- Eared pitta
- Flavescent bulbul
- Greater racket-tailed drongo
- Grey-headed canary-flycatcher
- Indian white-eye
- Malaysian pied fantail
- Mekong wagtail
- Pale-legged leaf warbler
- Pin-striped tit-babbler
- Plain flowerpecker
- Plain prinia
- Racket-tailed treepie
- Rosy minivet
- Silver-breasted broadbill
- Streaked wren-babbler
- Striated swallow
- Tickell's blue flycatcher
- Velvet-fronted nuthatch
- White-bellied erpornis
- White-crested laughingthrush
- White-rumped munia
- Yellow-bellied warbler

and some 60 species of non-passerine from 19 families, represented by one species:

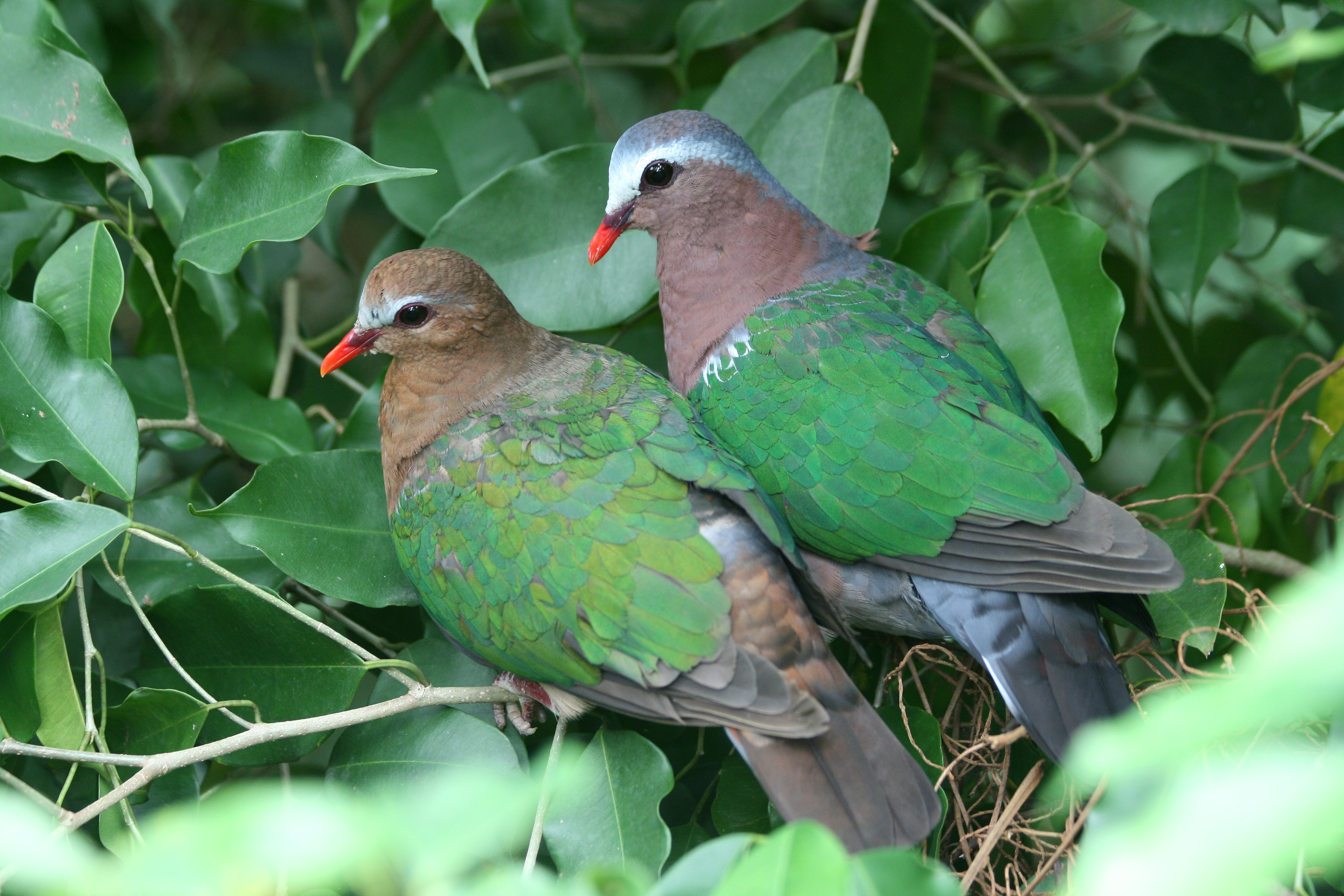
Common emerald dove

- Asian emerald cuckoo
- Asian openbill
- Banded kingfisher
- Bay woodpecker
- Black-winged stilt
- Brown-backed needletail
- Chestnut-headed bee-eater
- Common emerald dove
- Eurasian hoopoe
- Great hornbill
- Green-eared barbet
- Indochinese roller
- Large-tailed nightjar
- Little egret
- Red-headed trogon
- Shikra
- Silver pheasant
- Vernal hanging parrot
- White-breasted waterhen

And reptiles:

- Big-headed turtle
- Forest garden lizard
- Oriental whip snake
- Osella's skink
- Tokay gecko
- White-lipped pit viper

== Places ==
- Namtok Tat Mok - a one level 200–300 metres (660–980 ft) high waterfall.
- Namtok Song Nang - a 12-tiered waterfall.

== Location ==
Tat Mok National Park in overview PARO 11 (Phitsanulok)

8) Tat Mok National Park in overview PARO 11 (Phitsanulok)

	National park			1	Khao Kho
2	Khwae Noi	3	Lam Nam Nan	4	Nam Nao
5	Namtok Chat Trakan	6	Phu Hin Rong Kla	7	Phu Soi Dao
8	Tat Mok	9	Thung Salaeng Luang	10	Ton Sak Yai
	Wildlife sanctuary				
11	Mae Charim	12	Nam Pat	13	Phu Khat
14	Phu Miang-Phu Thong	15	Phu Pha Daeng	16	Tabo-Huai Yai

== See also ==
- List of national parks in Thailand
- DNP - Tat Mok National Park
- List of Protected Areas Regional Offices of Thailand
