= Phu Pha Daeng Wildlife Sanctuary =

Thailand wildlife sanctuary

- เขตรักษาพันธุ์สัตร์ป่าภูผาแดง
- IUCN category Ia (strict nature reserve)
- Location within Thailand
- Location: Phetchabun Province, Thailand
- Nearest city: Phetchabun
- Coordinates: 16°42′N 101°24′E
- Area: 235 km^{2} (91 sq mi)
- Established: 1999
- Governing body: Department of National Parks, Wildlife and Plant Conservation

Phu Pha Daeng Wildlife Sanctuary (Thai: เขตรักษาพันธุ์สัตว์ป่าภูผาแดง;RTGS: Khet Raksa Phan Satpa Phu Pha Daeng) is a wildlife sanctuary in Lom Sak District of Thailand's Phetchabun Province. The sanctuary covers an area of 235 square kilometres (91 sq mi) and was established in 1999.

== Geography ==
Phu Pha Daeng Wildlife Sanctuary is located about 35 kilometres (22 mi) northeast of Phetchabun town in Ban Klang, Ban Tio, Chang Talut, Huai Rai, Pak Chong and Thai Ibun subdistricts of Lom Sak District of Phetchabun Province.
The sanctuary's area is 235 square kilometres (91 sq mi) and is abutting Nam Nao National Park to the north and east and Tat Mok National Park to the south.
Landscape is largely covered by forests and in the west by mountains, the altitude varies from 200 metres (660 ft) to 1,143 metres (3,750 ft). This part of the Phetchabun Mountains has several small streams, which are tributaries of the Pa Sak River.

== Topography ==
Landscape is mostly covered by forested mountains, such as Phu Luak, Khao Khok Dein Thasi, Khao Khun Nam Phai and Khao Wang Han. The total forested area is 98%, divided into 66% high slope mountain area (mountain tops, high ridges, deeply incised streams, shallow valleys, upper slopes and local ridges) and 32% hill slope area (open slopes, midslope ridges and u-shaped valleys).

== Climate ==
The climate is characterised by three seasons: a wet season from May to October, a cooler, dry period from November to the beginning of February and a hot, dry season from mid-February to the beginning of May. Average highest temperature is 28.1 °C (82.6 °F) and the average lowest temperature is 10.2 °C (50.4 °F). The average precipitation amounts to 1,458 millimetres (57.4 in) per year. The average relative humidity is 76.0 percent.

== Flora ==
The sanctuary features mixed deciduous forest (75%), dry deciduous forest (15%), conifer forest (5%), agricultural area (2%) and bamboo forest (2%).

== Fauna ==
In the sanctuary are the following number of species: 17 mammals, 93 birds, 20 reptiles and 28 amphibians.

Mammals in the sanctuary are:

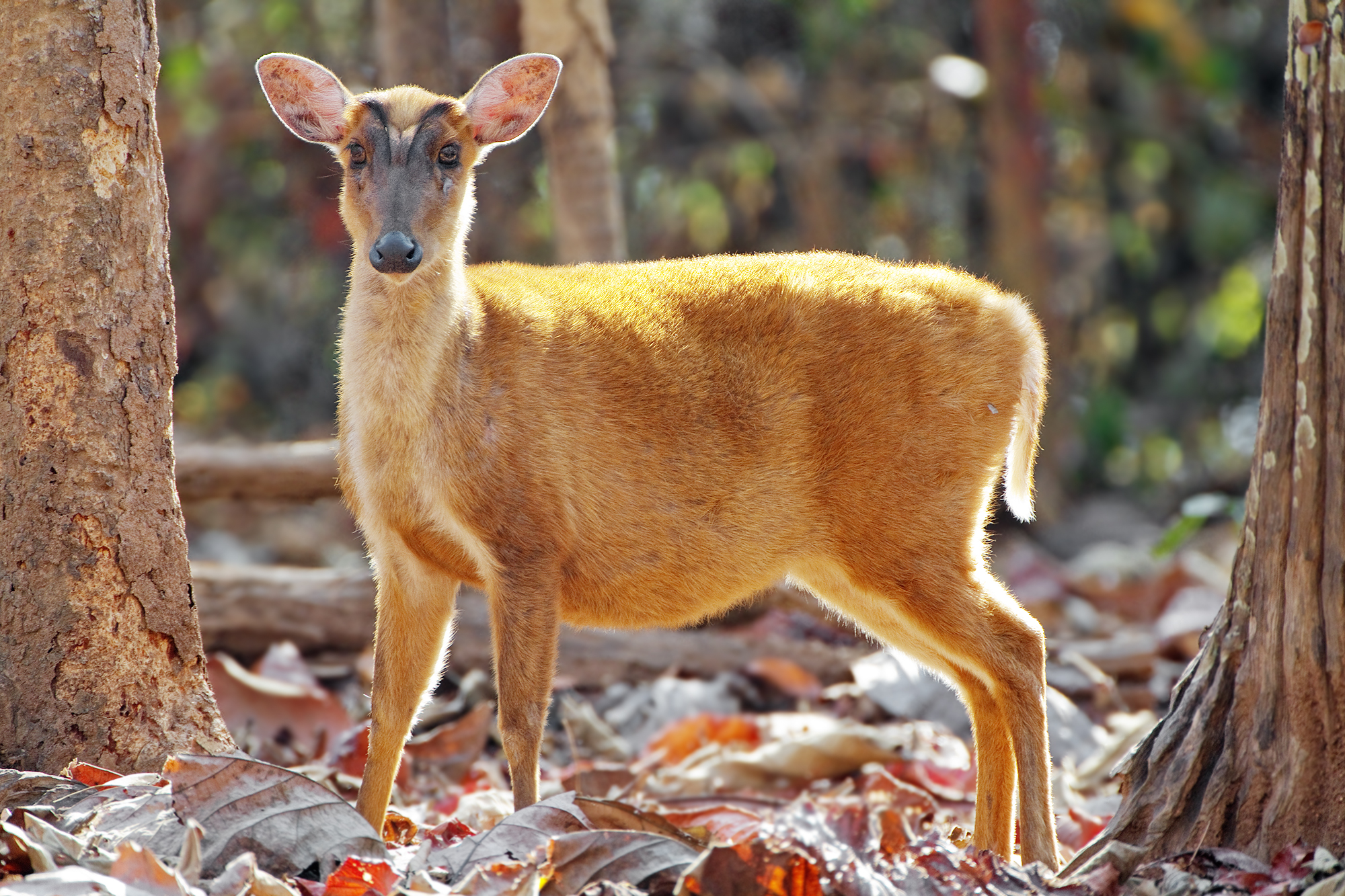
Barking deer (Muntiacus spp.)

- Asian black bear (Ursus thibetanus)
- Asian palm civet (Paradoxurus hermaphroditus)
- Asian wild dog (Cuon alpinus)
- Barking deer (Muntiacus spp.)
- Gibbon (Hylobates spp.)
- Macaque (Macaca spp.)
- Mainland serow (Capricornis sumatraensis)
- Malayan porcupine (Hystrix brachyura)
- Pangolin (Manis spp.)
- Sambar deer (Rusa unicolor)

One mammal species is listed as Endangered on the IUCN Red List:

- Asian wild dog (Cuon alpinus)

Three mammal species are listed as Vulnerable:

- Asian black bear (Ursus thibetanus)
- Mainland serow (Capricornis sumatraensis)
- Sambar deer (Rusa unicolor)

== Location ==
Phu Pha Daeng Wildlife Sanctuary in overview PARO 11 (Phitsanulok)

15) Phu Pha Daeng Wildlife Sanctuary in overview PARO 11 (Phitsanulok)

	Wildlife sanctuary				
11	Mae Charim	12	Nam Pat	13	Phu Khat
14	Phu Miang-Phu Thong	15	Phu Pha Daeng	16	Tabo-Huai Yai
	National park			1	Khao Kho
2	Khwae Noi	3	Lam Nam Nan	4	Nam Nao
5	Namtok Chat Trakan	6	Phu Hin Rong Kla	7	Phu Soi Dao
8	Tat Mok	9	Thung Salaeng Luang	10	Ton Sak Yai

== See also ==
- List of protected areas of Thailand
- DNP - Phu Pha Daeng Wildlife Sanctuary
- List of Protected Areas Regional Offices of Thailand
