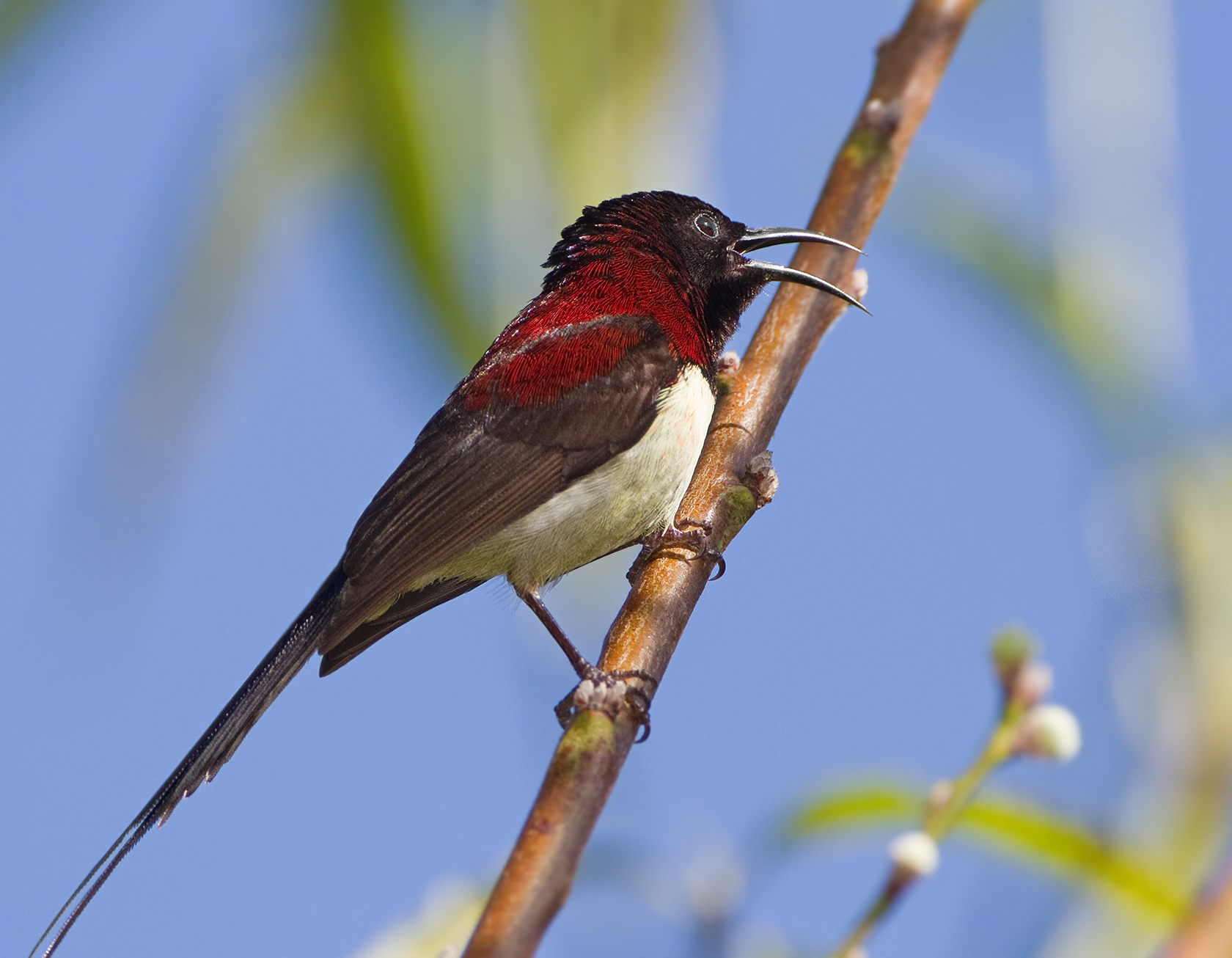
- An adult male Aethopyga saturata galenae at the Royal Agricultural Station, Ang Khang, Mon Pin, Chiang Mai, Thailand

Conservation status
- Least Concern (IUCN 3.1)

Scientific classification
- Kingdom: Animalia
- Phylum: Chordata
- Class: Aves
- Order: Passeriformes
- Family: Nectariniidae
- Genus: Aethopyga
- Species: A. saturata

Binomial name
- Aethopyga saturata (Hodgson, 1836)

= Black-throated sunbird =

Species of bird

The black-throated sunbird (Aethopyga saturata) is a species of bird in the family Nectariniidae.

It is found in the Indian subcontinent and adjoining regions of Southeast Asia, ranging across Bangladesh, Bhutan, Cambodia, China, India, Laos, Malaysia, Myanmar, Nepal, Thailand and Vietnam.

Its natural habitats are subtropical or tropical moist lowland forest and subtropical or tropical moist montane forest.
