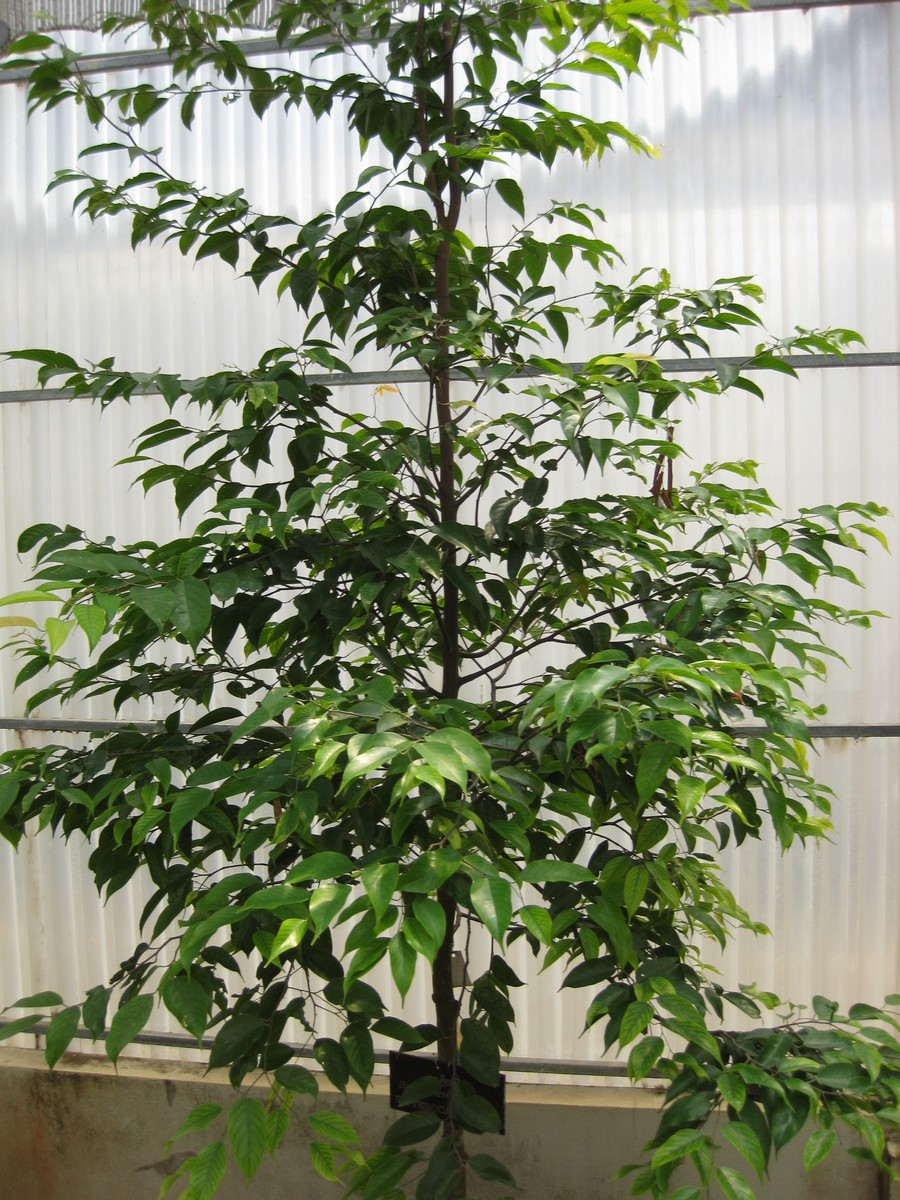

Conservation status
- Endangered (IUCN 3.1)

Scientific classification
- Kingdom: Plantae
- Clade: Tracheophytes
- Clade: Angiosperms
- Clade: Eudicots
- Clade: Rosids
- Order: Malvales
- Family: Dipterocarpaceae
- Genus: Hopea
- Species: H. ferrea

Binomial name
- Hopea ferrea Laness.

Synonyms
- Balanocarpus anomalus King; Hopea anomala (King) Foxw.; Hopea ferrea F.Heim

= Hopea ferrea =

Species of tree

Hopea ferrea is a species of tree in the family Dipterocarpaceae. It is native to Cambodia, Laos, Peninsular Malaysia, Thailand, and Vietnam.

It is the provincial tree of Thailand's Amnat Charoen Province.
