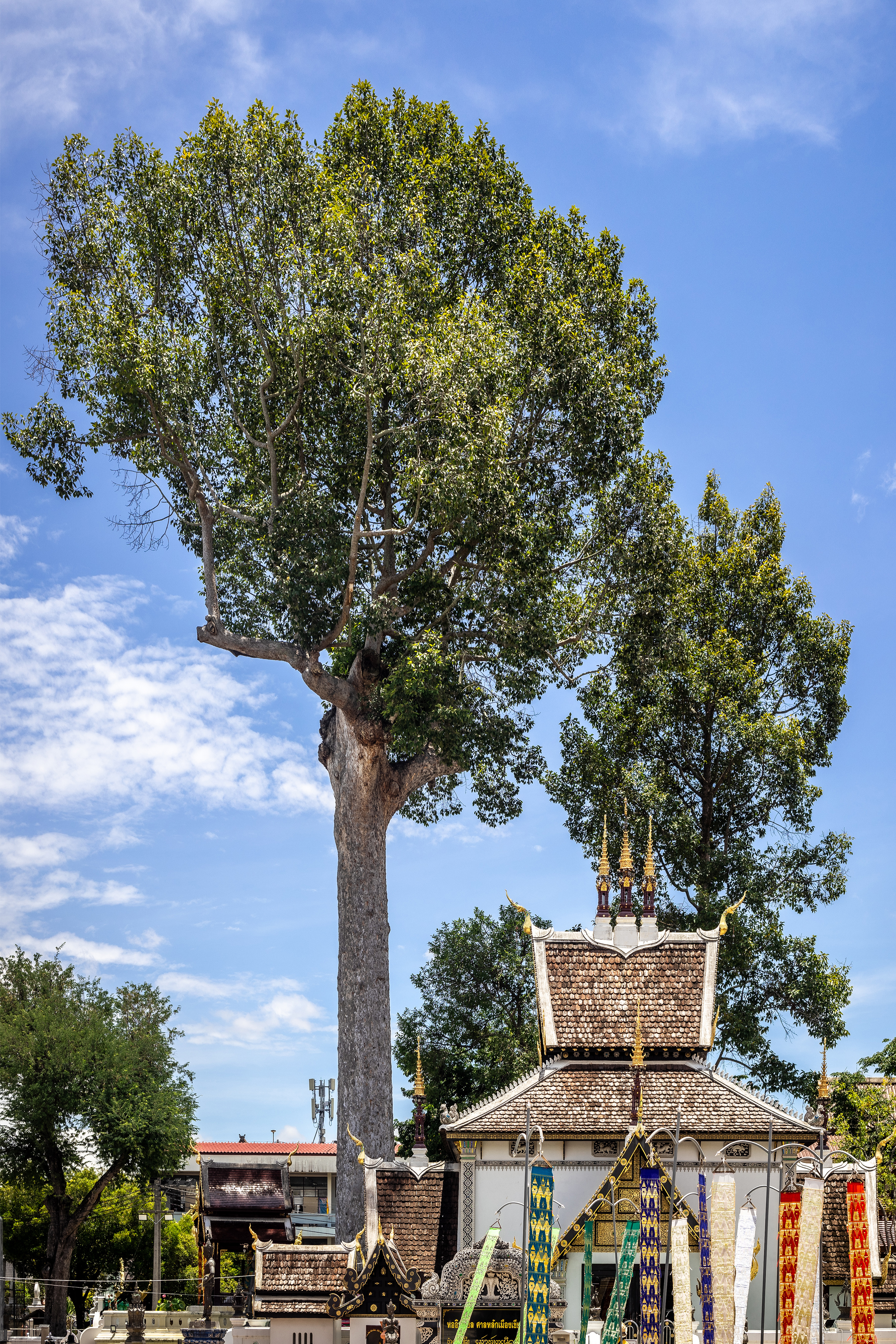
- In Chiang Mai City Pillar Shrine, Thailand
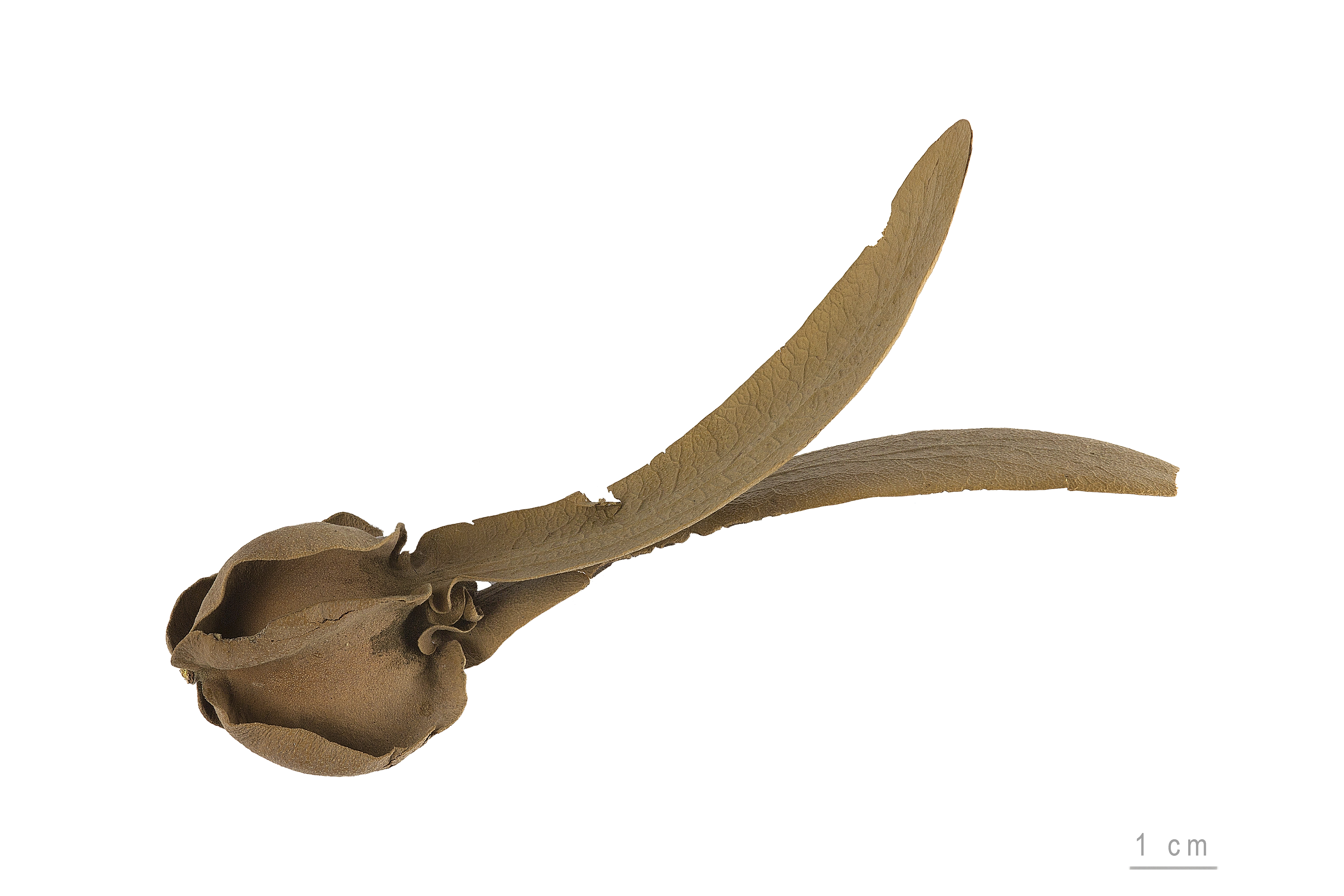
- Seed - MHNT

Conservation status
- Vulnerable (IUCN 3.1)

Scientific classification
- Kingdom: Plantae
- Clade: Tracheophytes
- Clade: Angiosperms
- Clade: Eudicots
- Clade: Rosids
- Order: Malvales
- Family: Dipterocarpaceae
- Genus: Dipterocarpus
- Species: D. alatus

Binomial name
- Dipterocarpus alatus Roxb. ex G.Don

Synonyms
- Dipterocarpus gonopterus Turcz.; Dipterocarpus incanus Roxb.; Dipterocarpus philippinensis Foxw.; Hopea conduplicata Buch.-Ham.; Oleoxylon balsamifera Roxb.; Pterigium costatum Corrêa

= Dipterocarpus alatus =

Species of flowering plant

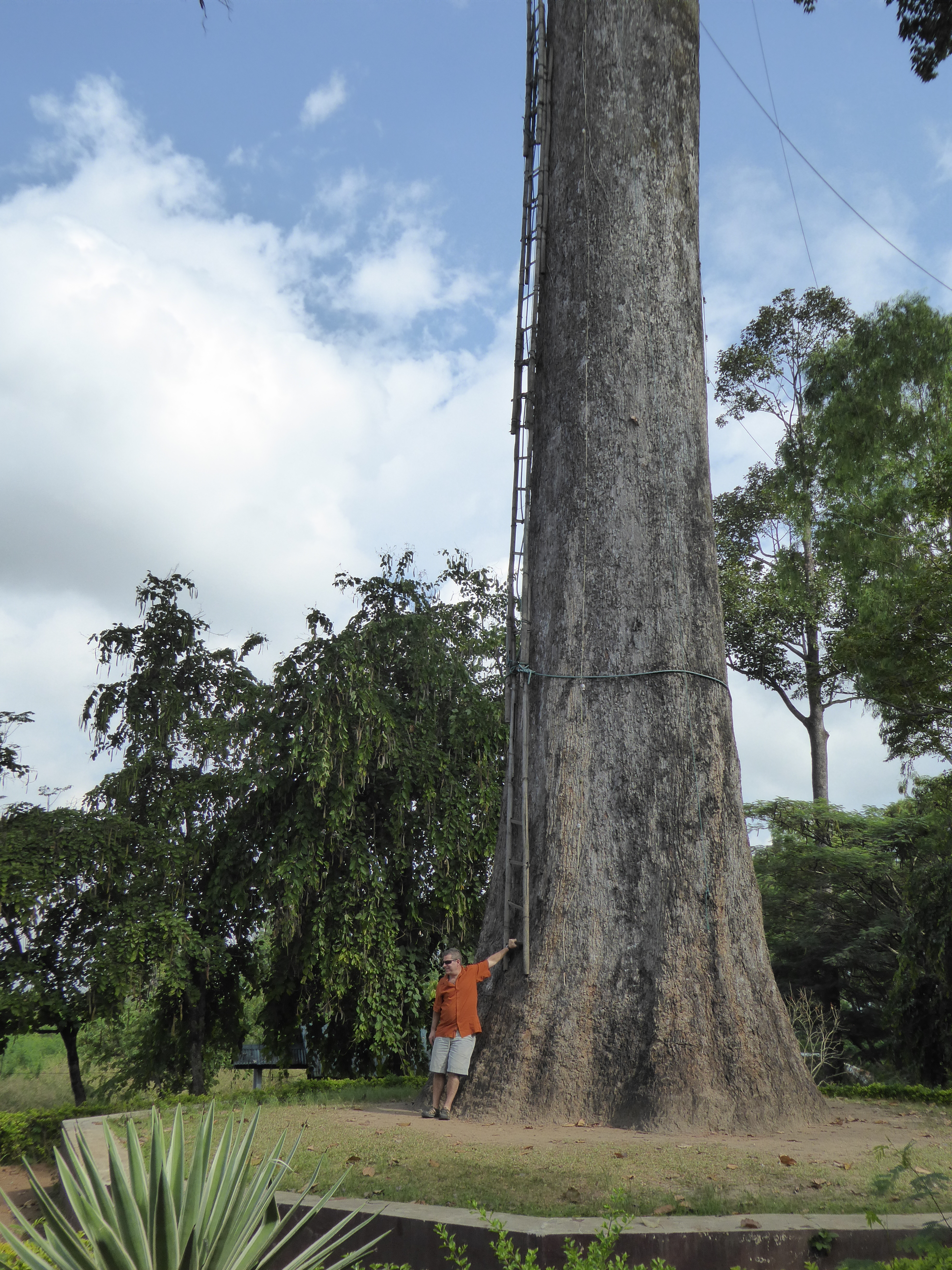
In Kengtung, Burma

Dipterocarpus alatus, the resin tree, is a tropical forest tree, of dense evergreen or mixed dense forests, in tropical Asia. It is considered vulnerable.

== Description ==
Dipterocarpus alatus is a large tree, growing 30–60 m (98–197 ft) tall. It is insect pollinated, and sets fruit between March and April. Its seeds are wind dispersed.

== Range and habitat ==
Dipterocarpus alatus ranges from West Bengal and Bangladesh through Myanmar, Thailand, Laos, Cambodia, Vietnam and the Philippines. It is also native to Sri Lanka and the Andaman Islands.

It grows in evergreen and semi-evergreen lowland dipterocarp forests in valleys and foothills. It is often found on ancient alluvial, granite, and basalt rock substrates. It requires humid and well-drained soil. It tolerates flooding but not fire or wind.

It often occurs gregariously along river banks and is a key planting species for regenerating deforested land around the Dong Nai river and Cat Tien National Park.

== Uses ==
In Cambodia, the wood is much valued in construction and cabinetwork, when not exploited for its oily resin. Generally, resin is collected for the following uses: wood lacquering, draught-proofing of boats and traditional medicine. When mixed with beeswax, it is used in bandages for ulcerated wounds. The bark of young trees is also used in traditional medicine, taken against rheumatism and diseases of the liver, and to stimulate appetite in cattle.

In Myanmar, one of the largest of the species is in Kengtung, see photos.

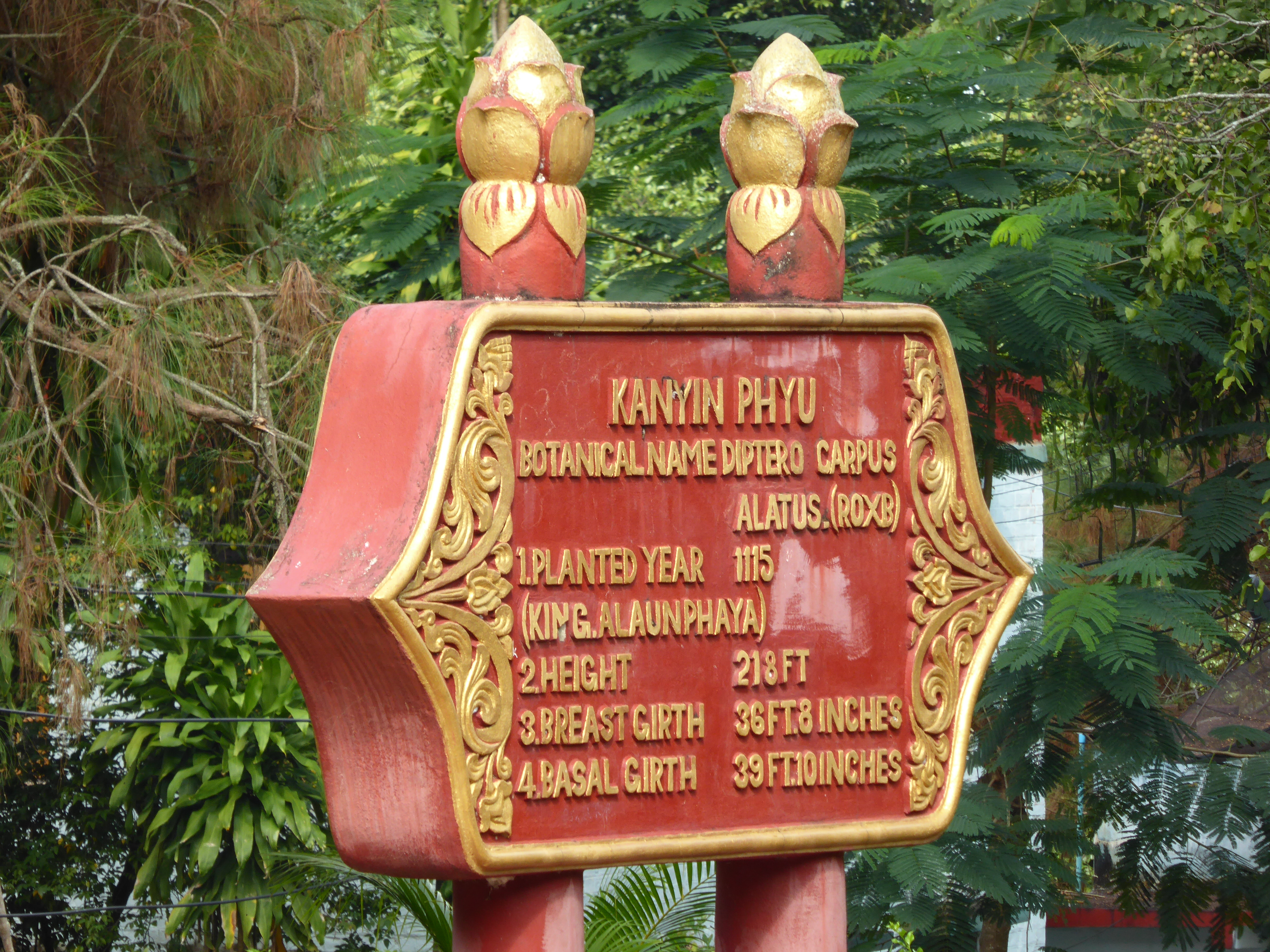
Descriptive sign for tree, Kengtung, Burma
