= Khao Yai–Khao Na Pha Tang and Khao Ta Phrom Non-hunting Area =

Protected area in Thailand

- เขตห้ามล่าสัตว์ป่าเขาใหญ–เขาหน้าผาตั้ง และ เขาตาพรม
- IUCN category III (natural monument or feature)
- Location within Thailand
- Location: Uttaradit Province, Thailand
- Nearest city: Uttaradit
- Coordinates: 17°32′6″N 100°20′30″E
- Area: 24 km^{2} (9.3 sq mi)
- Established: 1984
- Governing body: Department of National Parks, Wildlife and Plant Conservation

Khao Yai–Khao Na Pha Tang and Khao Ta Phrom Non-hunting Area (Thai: เขตห้ามล่าสัตว์ป่าเขาใหญ–เขาหน้าผาตั้ง และเขาตาพรม, RTGS: Khet Hamla Satpa Khao Yai–Khao Na Pha Tang leao Khao Ta Phrom) is a non-hunting area in Thong Saen Khan District of Uttaradit Province. It covers an area of 24 km^{2} (9.3 sq mi) and was established in 1984.

== Geography ==
Khao Yai–Khao Na Pha Tang and Khao Ta Phrom Non-hunting Area is located about 35 km (22 mi) east of Uttaradit town in Khao Yai Forest in Bo Thong Subdistrict, Nam Phi Subdistrict, Pa Khai Subdistrict, Phak Khuang Subdistrict, Thong Saen Khan District of Uttaradit Province. The non-hunting area consists of a larger northern part, including Khao Yai 647 m (2,123 ft) and Khao Na Pha Tang 370 m (1,210 ft) and a smaller southern part, including Khao Ta Phrom 311 m (1,020 ft) and is neighbouring Ton Sak Yai National Park in the north and east. Streams, such as Huai Phaniat, Huai Pladuk and Huai Taew, flow into Khlong Tron a tributary of the Nan River.

== Topography ==
Landscape is covered by forested mountains. The total mountained area is 99%, of which 60% high hill slope area (upper-slopes, mountain tops and shallow valleys) and 39% hill slope area (open slopes and midslope ridges). Plains count for 1%.

== Flora ==
The protected area features mixed deciduous forest (87%), abandoned farms (6%), agricultural area (5%) and other area (2%).

== Fauna ==
Mammals, there are 18 species from 18 families:

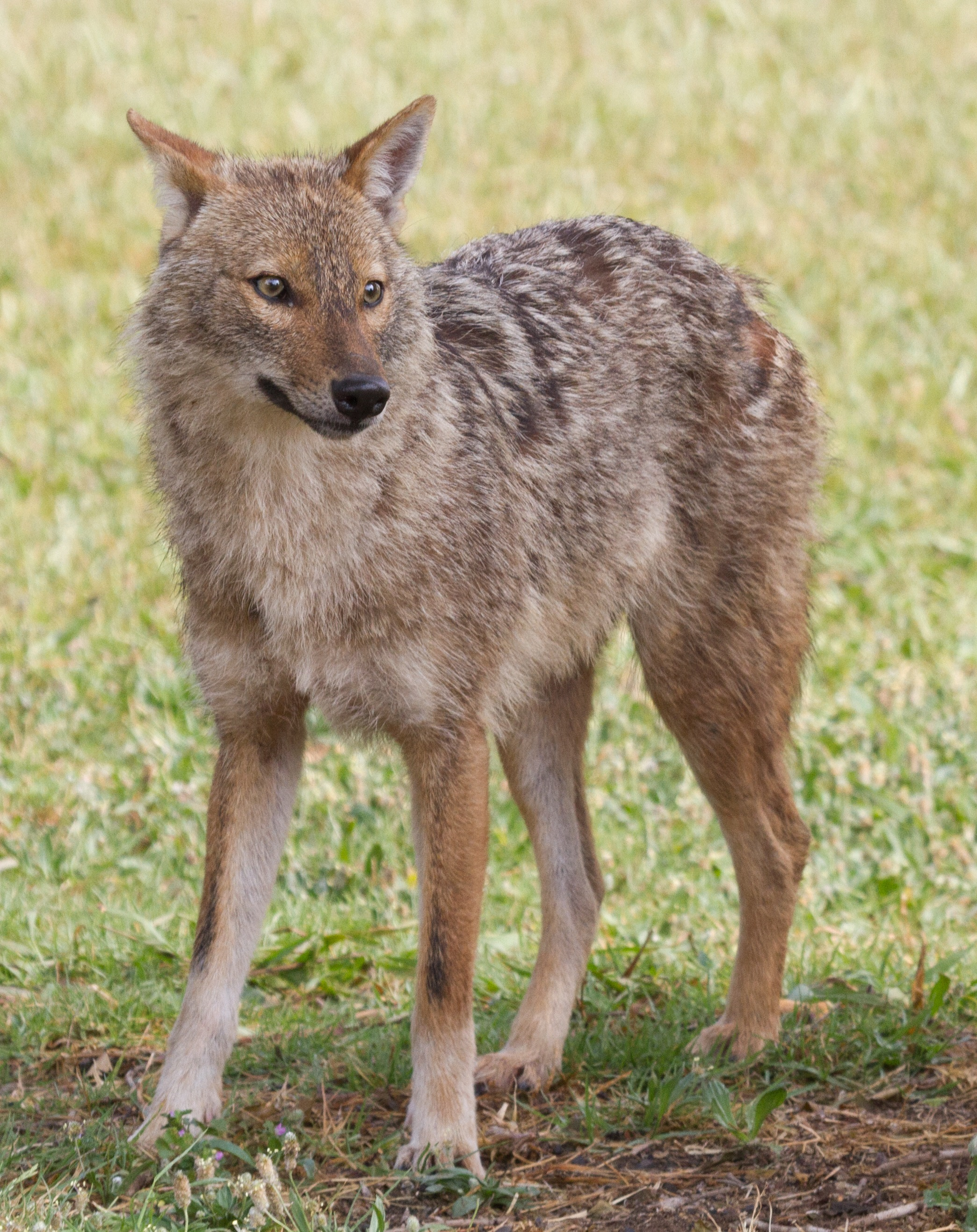
Golden jackal

- Asian palm civet (Paradoxurus hermaphroditus
- Asiatic brush-tailed porcupine (Atherusus macrourus)
- Burmese hare (Lepus peguensis)
- Finlayson's squirrel (Callosciurus finlaysonii)
- Fulvus roundleaf bat (Hipposideros)
- Golden jackal (Canis aureus)
- Javan mongoose (Urva javanica)
- Lar gibbon (Hylobates lar)
- Little bent-wing bat (Miniopterus australis)
- Macaque (Macaca spp.)
- Mainland serow (Capricornis sumatraensis)
- Mole (Talpa spp.)
- Phayre's langur (Trachypithecus phayrei)
- Small Indian civet (Viverricula indica)
- Sunda flying lemur (Cynocephalus variegatus)
- Sunda pangolin (Manis javanica)
- Wild boar (Sus scrofa)
- Wrinkle-lipped free-tailed bat (Tadarida plicata)

Birds, there are some 18 species, of which 6 species of passerine from 6 families:

- Barn swallow
- Common hill myna
- Common myna
- Drongo
- Large-billed crow
- Old World flycatcher

and 12 species of non-passerine from 11 families:

- Asian koel
- Black-crowned night heron
- Common emerald dove
- Cuckoo-dove
- Greater coucal
- Indian scops owl
- Oriental turtle-dove
- Red junglefowl
- Spotted dove
- White-throated kingfisher
- Zebra dove

== Location ==
Khao Yai–Khao Na Pha Tang and Khao Ta Phrom N.H.A. in overview PARO 11 (Phitsanulok)

24) Khao Yai–Khao Na Pha Tang and Khao Ta Phrom N.H.A. in overview PARO 11 (Phitsanulok)

	Non-hunting area	17	Ban Yang	18	Bo Pho Thi–Pak Thong Chai
19	Dong Khlo–Huai Kapo	20	Huai Phueng–Wang Yao	21	Khao Kho
22	Khao Noi–Khao Pradu	23	Khao Phanom Thong	24	Khao Yai–Khao Na Pha Tang and Khao Ta Phrom
25	Phu San Khiao	26	Phutthabat Chon Daen	27	Song Khwae
28	Tha Daeng	29	Tham Pha Tha Phon	30	Wang Pong–Chon Daen
	Wildlife sanctuary				
11	Mae Charim	12	Nam Pat	13	Phu Khat
14	Phu Miang–Phu Thong	15	Phu Pha Daeng	16	Tabo–Huai Yai
	National park			1	Khao Kho
2	Khwae Noi	3	Lam Nam Nan	4	Nam Nao
5	Namtok Chat Trakan	6	Phu Hin Rong Kla	7	Phu Soi Dao
8	Tat Mok	9	Thung Salaeng Luang	10	Ton Sak Yai

== See also ==
- List of protected areas of Thailand
- DNP - Khao Yai–Khao Na Pha Tang and Khao Ta Phrom Non-hunting Area
- List of Protected Areas Regional Offices of Thailand
