= Khao Noi–Khao Pradu Non-hunting Area =

Protected area in Thailand

- เขตห้ามล่าสัตว์ป่าเขาน้อย-เขาประดู่
- IUCN category III (natural monument or feature)
- Location within Thailand
- Location: Phitsanulok Province, Thailand
- Nearest city: Phitsanulok
- Coordinates: 17°02′N 100°27′E
- Area: 129 km^{2} (50 sq mi)
- Established: 1998
- Governing body: Department of National Parks, Wildlife and Plant Conservation

Khao Noi–Khao Pradu Non-hunting Area (Thai: เขตห้ามล่าสัตว์ป่าเขาน้อย-เขาประดู่, RTGS: Khet Hamla Satpa Khao Noi-Khao Pradu) is a non-hunting area in Mueang Phitsanulok District, Wang Thong District and Wat Bot District of Phitsanulok Province. It covers an area of 129 km^{2} (50 sq mi) and was established in 1998.

== Geography ==
Khao Noi–Khao Pradu Non-hunting Area is located about 25 km (16 mi) northeast of Phitsanulok city in Don Thong Subdistrict, Mueang Phitsanulok District and Ban Klang, Chai Nam, Wang Nok Aen Subdistricts, Wang Thong District and Ban Yang, Hin Lat, Khan Chong Subdistricts, Wat Bot District of Phitsanulok Province.
The non-hunting area is 40 km (25 mi) long and has a maximum width of 5 km (3.1 mi), total area is 129 km^{2} (50 sq mi) and is neighbouring by Song Khwae Non-hunting Area to the north, Khwae Noi National Park to the east and Thung Salaeng Luang National Park to the southeast. Streams flow into the Khwae Noi River a tributary of the Nan River.

== Topography ==
Landscape is mostly covered by forested mountains, such as Khao Noi in the north and Khao Pradu in the south. The total mountained area is 88%, divided into 33% high slope mountain area (upper-slopes, shallow valleys, mountain tops and deeply incised streams) and 55% hill slope area (open slopes, u-shaped valleys and midslope ridges). There are plains for 12%.

== History ==
In 1992 a survey was set up by the Phitsanulok Regional Forestry Office for Khao Noi–Khao Pradu forest area and many wild animals were found here. In 1994 the forest area on both sides of the Khwae Noi River were surveyed and also many kinds of wild animals were found there. Later in 1998 the Ministry of Agriculture and Cooperatives proposed that the area should be Khao Noi–Khao Pradu Non-hunting Area, which was publized in the Government Gazette, volume 115, issue 43 Ngor, dated May 28, 1998. Since 2002 this non-hunting area has been managed by Protected Areas Regional Office 11 (Phitsanulok).

== Flora ==
The non-hunting area features mixed deciduous forest (89%), agricultural area (6%), and abandoned farms (5%).

== Fauna ==
Mammals, there are 20 species from 13 families, represented by one species:

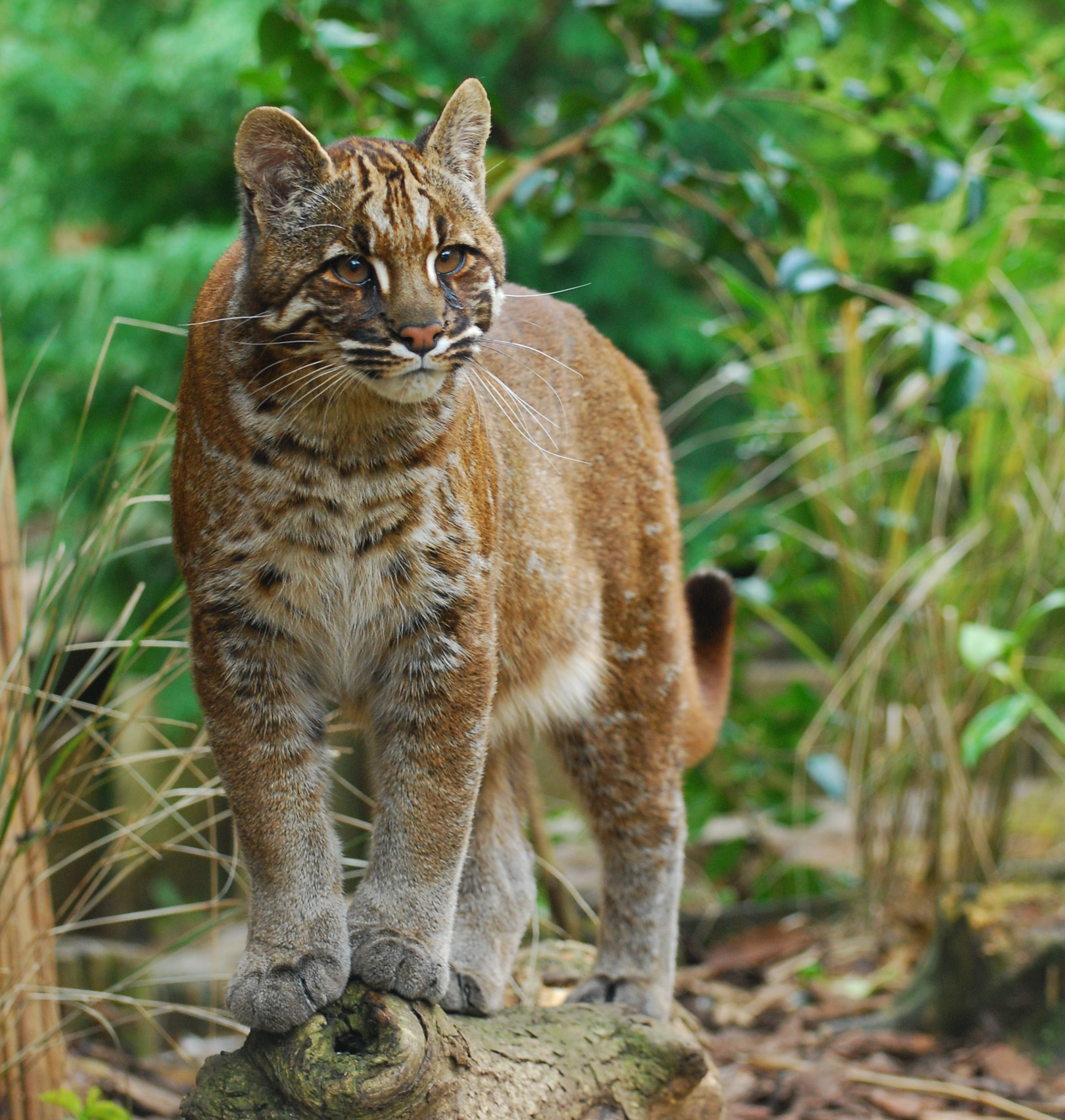
Asian golden cat

- Asian golden cat (Catopuma temminckii)
- Asiatic brush-tailed porcupine (Atherusus macrourus)
- Asiatic wild dog (Cuon alpinus)
- Burmese hare (Lepus peguensis)
- Finlayson's squirrel (Callosciurus finlaysonii)
- Greater slow loris (Nycticebus coucang)
- Javan mongoose (Urva javanica)
- Large Indian civet (Viverra zibetha)
- Lesser bamboo rat (Cannomys badius)
- Malayan flying lemur (Galeopterus variegatus)
- Rhesus macaque (Macaca mulatta)
- Sunda pangolin (Manis javanica)
- Wild boar (Sus scrofa)

Birds, there are some 120 species, of which 70 species of passerine from 30 families, represented by one species:

- Ashy woodswallow
- Australasian pipit
- Bar-winged flycatcher-shrike
- Black-browed reed warbler
- Black drongo
- Black-naped monarch
- Black-naped oriole
- Black-throated laughingthrush
- Brown shrike
- Chestnut-tailed starling
- Common iora
- Common tailorbird
- Golden babbler
- Golden-fronted leafbird
- Grey-headed canary-flycatcher
- Indochinese bush lark
- Indochinese cuckooshrike
- Lanceolated warbler
- Malaysian pied fantail
- Olive-backed sunbird
- Oriental magpie-robin
- Puff-throated babbler
- Red-billed blue magpie
- Red-rumped swallow
- Red-whiskered bulbul
- Scarlet-backed flowerpecker
- Velvet-fronted nuthatch
- White-rumped munia
- Yellow-bellied warbler
- Yellow-browed warbler

and 50 species of non-passerine from 19 families, represented by one species:

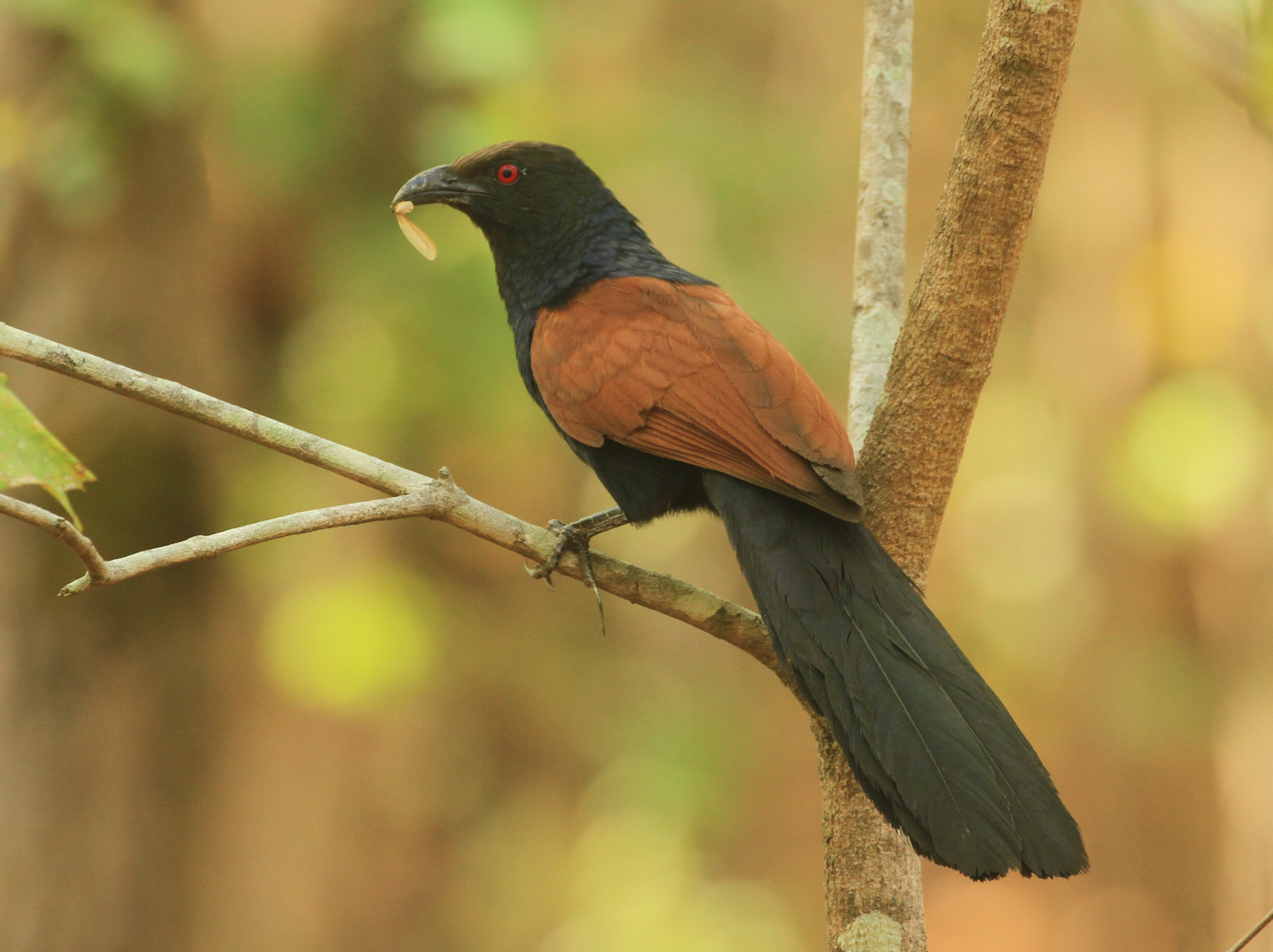
Greater coucal

- Asian barred owlet
- Asian green bee-eater
- Asian palm swift
- Black-headed woodpecker
- Chinese pond heron
- Coppersmith barbet
- Crested treeswift
- Eurasian hoopoe
- Greater coucal
- Grey-headed parakeet
- Indian roller
- Large cuckooshrike
- Large-tailed nightjar
- Lesser whistling duck
- Red junglefowl
- Red-wattled lapwing
- Shikra
- Thick-billed green pigeon
- White-throated kingfisher

Reptiles, there are 12 species from 8 families, represented by one species:

- Asian water monitor
- Asiatic softshell turtle
- Blue-crested lizard
- Giant Asian pond turtle
- Monocled cobra
- Painted Bronzeback
- Reticulated python
- White-lipped pit viper

Amphibians, there are 6 species from 3 families, represented by one species:

- Asian common toad
- Marbled pygmy frog
- Rice field frog

== Location ==
Khao Noi–Khao Pradu Non-hunting Area in overview PARO 11 (Phitsanulok)

22) Khao Noi–Khao Pradu N.H.A. in overview PARO 11 (Phitsanulok)

	Non-hunting area	17	Ban Yang	18	Bo Pho Thi–Pak Thong Chai
19	Dong Khlo–Huai Kapo	20	Huai Phueng–Wang Yao	21	Khao Kho
22	Khao Noi–Khao Pradu	23	Khao Phanom Thong	24	Khao Yai–Khao Na Pha Tang and Khao Ta Phrom
25	Phu San Khiao	26	Phutthabat Chon Daen	27	Song Khwae
28	Tha Daeng	29	Tham Pha Tha Phon	30	Wang Pong–Chon Daen
	Wildlife sanctuary				
11	Mae Charim	12	Nam Pat	13	Phu Khat
14	Phu Miang–Phu Thong	15	Phu Pha Daeng	16	Tabo–Huai Yai
	National park			1	Khao Kho
2	Khwae Noi	3	Lam Nam Nan	4	Nam Nao
5	Namtok Chat Trakan	6	Phu Hin Rong Kla	7	Phu Soi Dao
8	Tat Mok	9	Thung Salaeng Luang	10	Ton Sak Yai

== See also ==
- List of protected areas of Thailand
- DNP - Khao Noi–Khao Pradu Non-hunting Area
- List of Protected Areas Regional Offices of Thailand
