= Tham Pha Tha Phon Non-hunting Area =

Protected area in Thailand

- เขตห้ามล่าสัตว์ป่าถ้ำผาท่าพล
- IUCN category III (natural monument or feature)
- Location within Thailand
- Location: Phitsanulok Province, Thailand
- Nearest city: Phichit
- Coordinates: 16°30′N 100°40′E
- Area: 284 ha (700 acres)
- Established: 1983
- Governing body: Department of National Parks, Wildlife and Plant Conservation

Tham Pha Tha Phon Non-hunting Area (Thai: เขตห้ามล่าสัตว์ป่าถ้ำผาท่าพล, RTGS: Khet Hamla Satpa Tham Pha Tha Phon) is a non-hunting area in Noen Maprang District of Phitsanulok Province. It covers an area of 284 ha (700 acres) and was established in 1983.

== Geography ==
Tham Pha Tha Phon Non-hunting Area is located about 40 km (25 mi) east of Phichit town in Tham Pha Tha Phon Forest in Ban Noi Subdistrict, Ban Mung Subdistrict, Noen Maprang District of Phitsanulok Province. The non-hunting area is approximately 2,400 m (7,900 ft) long, 1,000 m (3,300 ft) wide, 284 ha (700 acres) area and is neighbouring Thung Salaeng Luang National Park to the east. A creek flows into Lower Nan River.

== Topography ==
A limestone hill, elevation of 236 m (774 ft), with a plain in the valley area. The total hill area is 93%, of which 40% high hill slope area (upper-slopes, shallow valleys and hill tops) and 53% hill slope area (open slopes and small hills in plains). Plains count for 7%.

== Flora ==
The non-hunting area features mixed deciduous forest (28%), savanna (35%) and agricultural area (37%).

== Fauna ==
Mammals, there are 15 species from 15 families:

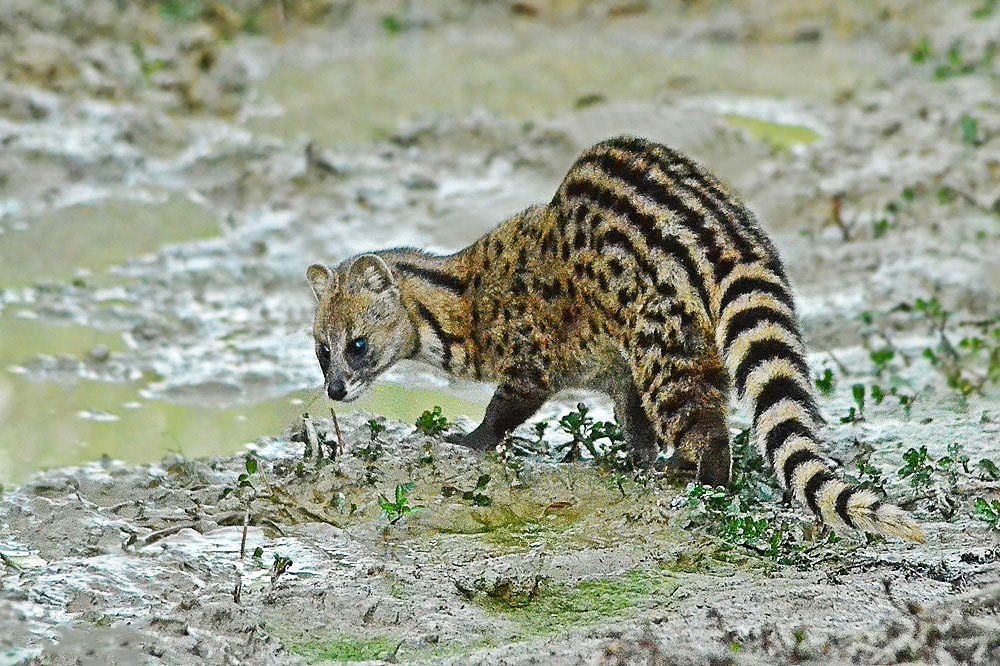
Small Indian civet

- Asian black bear (Ursus thibetanus)
- Asian golden cat (Felis temmincki)
- Asian palm civet (Paradoxurus hermaphroditus
- Asiatic brush-tailed porcupine (Atherusus macrourus)
- Burmese hare (Lepus peguensis)
- Finlayson's squirrel (Callosciurus finlaysonii)
- Greater short-nosed fruit bat (Cynopterus sphinx)
- Javan mongoose (Urva javanica)
- Lesser bamboo bat (Tylonycteris pachypus)
- Mainland serow (Capricornis sumatraensis)
- Phayre's langur (Trachypithecus phayrei)
- Rhesus macaque (Macaca mulatta)
- Small Indian civet (Viverricula indica)
- Sun bear (Helarctos malayanus)
- Sunda pangolin (Manis javanicus)

Birds, there are some 6 species from 6 families:

- Barn swallow
- Common myna
- Greater coucal
- Indian jungle crow
- Red junglefowl
- White-throated kingfisher

Reptiles

- Elongated tortoise
- Giant Asian pond turtle

== Location ==
Tham Pha Tha Phon Non-hunting Area in overview PARO 11 (Phitsanulok)

29) Tham Pha Tha Phon N.H.A. in overview PARO 11 (Phitsanulok)

	Non-hunting area	17	Ban Yang	18	Bo Pho Thi–Pak Thong Chai
19	Dong Khlo–Huai Kapo	20	Huai Phueng–Wang Yao	21	Khao Kho
22	Khao Noi–Khao Pradu	23	Khao Phanom Thong	24	Khao Yai–Khao Na Pha Tang and Khao Ta Phrom
25	Phu San Khiao	26	Phutthabat Chon Daen	27	Song Khwae
28	Tha Daeng	29	Tham Pha Tha Phon	30	Wang Pong–Chon Daen
	Wildlife sanctuary				
11	Mae Charim	12	Nam Pat	13	Phu Khat
14	Phu Miang–Phu Thong	15	Phu Pha Daeng	16	Tabo–Huai Yai
	National park			1	Khao Kho
2	Khwae Noi	3	Lam Nam Nan	4	Nam Nao
5	Namtok Chat Trakan	6	Phu Hin Rong Kla	7	Phu Soi Dao
8	Tat Mok	9	Thung Salaeng Luang	10	Ton Sak Yai

== See also ==
- List of protected areas of Thailand
- DNP - Tham Pha Tha Phon Non-hunting Area
- List of Protected Areas Regional Offices of Thailand
