= Khao Kho Non-hunting Area =

Protected area in Thailand

- เขตห้ามล่าสัตว์ป่าเขาค้อ
- IUCN category III (natural monument or feature)
- Location within Thailand
- Location: Phetchabun Province, Thailand
- Nearest city: Phetchabun
- Coordinates: 16°37′N 100°56′E
- Area: 44 km^{2} (17 sq mi)
- Established: 1986
- Governing body: Department of National Parks, Wildlife and Plant Conservation

Khao Kho Non-hunting Area (Thai: เขตห้ามล่าสัตว์ป่าเขาค้อ, RTGS: Khet Hamla Satpa Khao Kho) is a non-hunting area in Khao Kho District of Phetchabun Province. It covers an area of 44 km^{2} (17 sq mi) and was established in 1986.

== Geography ==
Khao Kho Non-hunting Area is located about 30 km (19 mi) northwest of Phetchabun town in Khao Kho Subdistrict, Nong Mae Na Subdistrict, Sado Phong Subdistrict, Khao Kho District of Phetchabun Province. The non-hunting area is 44 km^{2} (17 sq mi) and is abutting Thung Salaeng Luang National Park to the west and neighbouring Khao Kho National Park to the east and south. Streams flow into Wang Thong River a tributary of the Nan River.

== Topography ==
Landscape is covered by forested mountains, the height ranged from 700–1,000 m (2,300–3,300 ft). The total mountain area is 74%, of which 20% in the east (Khao Khat) and northeast (Khao Kho) high slope mountain area (upper-slopes, shallow valleys, mountain tops and deeply incised streams) and 54% hill slope area (open slopes, u-shaped valleys and midslope ridges). Plains count for 26%.

== Flora ==
The non-hunting area features dry evergreen forest (83%), agricultural area (15%), and abandoned farms (2%).

== Fauna ==
Mammals, there are 20 species from 16 families, represented by one species:

- Asian black bear (Ursus thibetanus)
- Asian palm civet (Paradoxurus hermaphroditus
- Asiatic porcupine (Atherusus macrourus)
- Assam macaque (Macaca assamensis)
- Burmese hare (Lepus peguensis)
- Finlayson's squirrel (Callosciurus finlaysonii)
- Fishing cat (Felis viverrina)
- Java mouse-deer (Tragulus javanicus)
- Javan mongoose (Urva javanica)
- Lar gibbon (Hylobates lar)
- Muntjac (Muntiacus muntjak)
- Phayre's langur (Trachypithecus phayrei)
- Sambar deer (Rusa unicolor)
- Small Indian civet (Viverricula indica)
- Smooth-coated otter (Lutrogale perspicillata)
- Wild boar (Sus scrofa)

Birds, there are some 24 species, of which 12 species of passerine from 10 families, represented by one species:

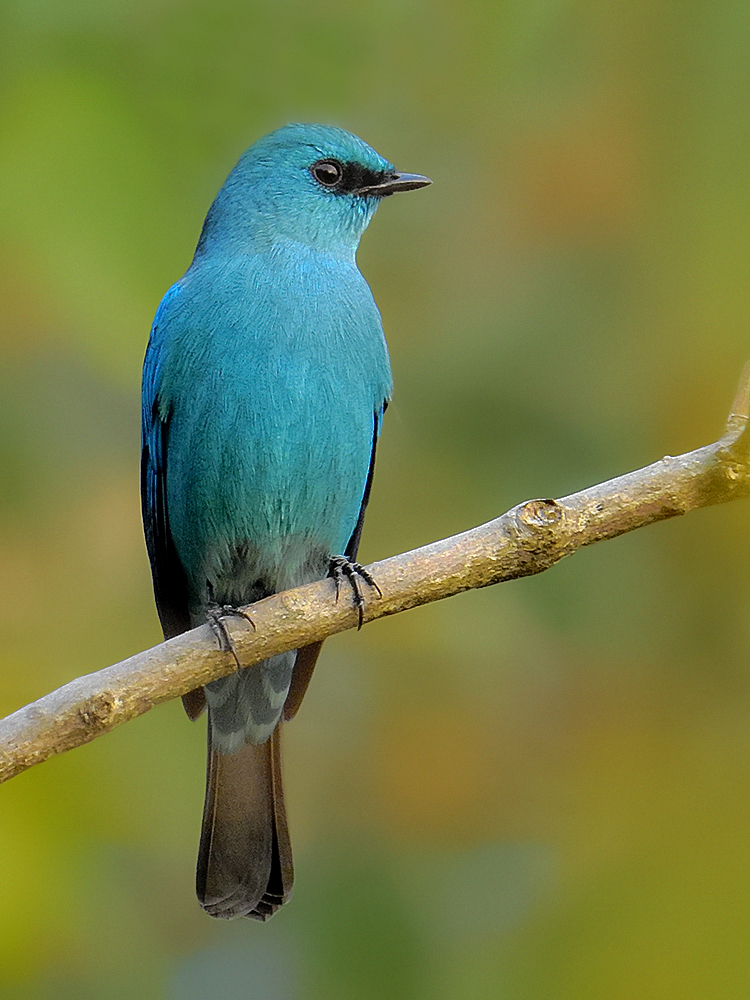
Verditer flycatcher

- Asian brown flycatcher
- Common hill myna
- Common myna
- Greater racket-tailed drongo
- Grey-headed canary-flycatcher
- Oriental magpie-robin
- Red-breasted flycatcher
- Red-whiskered bulbul
- Tickell's blue flycatcher
- Verditer flycatcher

and 12 species of non-passerine from 12 families, represented by one species:

- Asian koel
- Black-crowned night heron
- Buff-spotted flameback
- Chestnut-necklaced partridge
- Green peafowl
- Kalij pheasant
- Large-tailed nightjar
- Lineated barbet
- Red junglefowl
- Spotted dove
- Spotted owlet
- Thick-billed green pigeon

Reptiles

- Bengal monitor

== Location ==
Khao Kho Non-hunting Area in overview PARO 11 (Phitsanulok)

21) Khao Kho Non-hunting Area in overview PARO 11 (Phitsanulok)

	Non-hunting area	17	Ban Yang	18	Bo Pho Thi–Pak Thong Chai
19	Dong Khlo–Huai Kapo	20	Huai Phueng–Wang Yao	21	Khao Kho
22	Khao Noi–Khao Pradu	23	Khao Phanom Thong	24	Khao Yai–Khao Na Pha Tang and Khao Ta Phrom
25	Phu San Khiao	26	Phutthabat Chon Daen	27	Song Khwae
28	Tha Daeng	29	Tham Pha Tha Phon	30	Wang Pong–Chon Daen
	Wildlife sanctuary				
11	Mae Charim	12	Nam Pat	13	Phu Khat
14	Phu Miang–Phu Thong	15	Phu Pha Daeng	16	Tabo–Huai Yai
	National park			1	Khao Kho
2	Khwae Noi	3	Lam Nam Nan	4	Nam Nao
5	Namtok Chat Trakan	6	Phu Hin Rong Kla	7	Phu Soi Dao
8	Tat Mok	9	Thung Salaeng Luang	10	Ton Sak Yai

== See also ==
- List of protected areas of Thailand
- DNP - Khao Kho Non-hunting Area
- List of Protected Areas Regional Offices of Thailand
