= Wang Pong–Chon Daen Non-hunting Area =

Protected area in Thailand

- เขตห้ามล่าสัตว์ป่าวังโป่ง-ชนแดน
- IUCN category III (natural monument or feature)
- Location within Thailand
- Location: Phetchabun Province, Thailand
- Nearest city: Phetchabun
- Coordinates: 16°22′N 100°55′E
- Area: 148 km^{2} (57 sq mi)
- Established: 1987
- Governing body: Department of National Parks, Wildlife and Plant Conservation

Wang Pong–Chon Daen Non-hunting Area (Thai: เขตห้ามล่าสัตว์ป่าวังโป่ง-ชนแดน, RTGS: Khet Hamla Satpa Wang Pong-Chon Daen) is a non-hunting area in Mueang Phetchabun District and Wang Pong District of Phetchabun Province. It covers an area of 148 km^{2} (57 sq mi) and was established in 1987.

== Geography ==
Wang Pon–Chon Daen Non-hunting Area is located about 15 km (9.3 mi) southwest of Phetchabun town in Ban Tok Subdistrict, Pa Lao Subdistrict, Mueang Phetchabun District and Sap Poep Subdistrict, Thai Dong Subdistrict, Wang Pon District of Phetchabun Province. The non-hunting area is 148 km^{2} (57 sq mi) and is abutting Khao Kho National Park to the north, neighbouring Kho Rang Forest Park to the south and Thung Salaeng Luang National Park to the northwest. Streams flow east into Pasak River and southwest into Wang Thong River a tributary of the Nan River.

== Topography ==
Landscape is mostly covered by forested mountains, the height ranged from 400–1,200 m (1,300–3,900 ft). The total mountained area is 94%, divided into 40% high slope mountain area (upper-slopes, shallow valleys, mountain tops and deeply incised streams) and 54% hill slope area (open slopes, u-shaped valleys and midslope ridges). Plains count for 6%.

== Flora ==
The non-hunting area features dry evergreen forest (61%), mixed deciduous forest (20%), degraded forest (3%), agricultural area (13%), and abandoned farms (3%).

== Fauna ==
Mammals, there are 38 species from 33 families, represented by one species:

- Asian black bear (Ursus thibetanus)
- Asian elephant (Elaphas maximus)
- Asian golden cat (Catopuma temminckii)
- Asiatic porcupine (Atherusus macrourus)
- Banded palm civet (Hemigalus derbyanus)
- Banteng (Bos javanicus)
- Black giant squirrel (Ratufa bicolor)
- Burmese ferret-badger (Melogale personata)
- Burmese hare (Lepus peguensis)
- Eurasian otter (Lutra lutra)
- Gaur (Bos gaurus)
- Greater hog badger (Arctonyx collaris)
- Java mouse-deer (Tragulus javanicus)
- Jungle cat (Felis chaus)
- Large-spotted civet (Viverra megaspila)
- Leopard (Panthera pardus)
- Leopard cat (Prionailurus bengalensis)
- Mainland serow (Capricornis sumatraensis)
- Malayan porcupine (Hystrix brachyura)
- Marbled cat (Pardofelis marmorata)
- Muntjac (Muntiacus muntjak)
- Red giant flying squirrel (P. petaurista)
- Rhesus macaque (macaca mulatta)
- Sambar deer (Rusa unicolor)
- Siberian weasel (Mustela sibirica)
- Small Indian civet (Viverricula indica)
- Spotted linsang (Prionodon pardicolor)
- Sun bear (Helarctos malayanus)
- Sunda flying lemur (Cynocephalus variegatus)
- Sunda slow loris (Nycticebus coucang)
- White-handed gibbon (Hylobates lar)
- Wild boar (Sus scrofa)
- Yellow-throated marten (Martes flavigula)

Birds, there are some 52 species, of which 22 species of passerine from 21 families, represented by one species:

- Ashy bulbul
- Asian fairy-bluebird
- Bengal bushlark
- Chestnut-bellied rock thrush
- Common hill myna
- Common myna
- Indian jungle crow
- Leafbird
- Oriolus
- Pitta
- Purple sunbird
- Pycnonotus
- Radde's warbler
- Red-throated sunbird
- Red-wattled lapwing
- Sikkim treecreeper
- Sturnus
- Swallow
- White-crested laughingthrush
- White-eyed river martin
- White-rumped shama

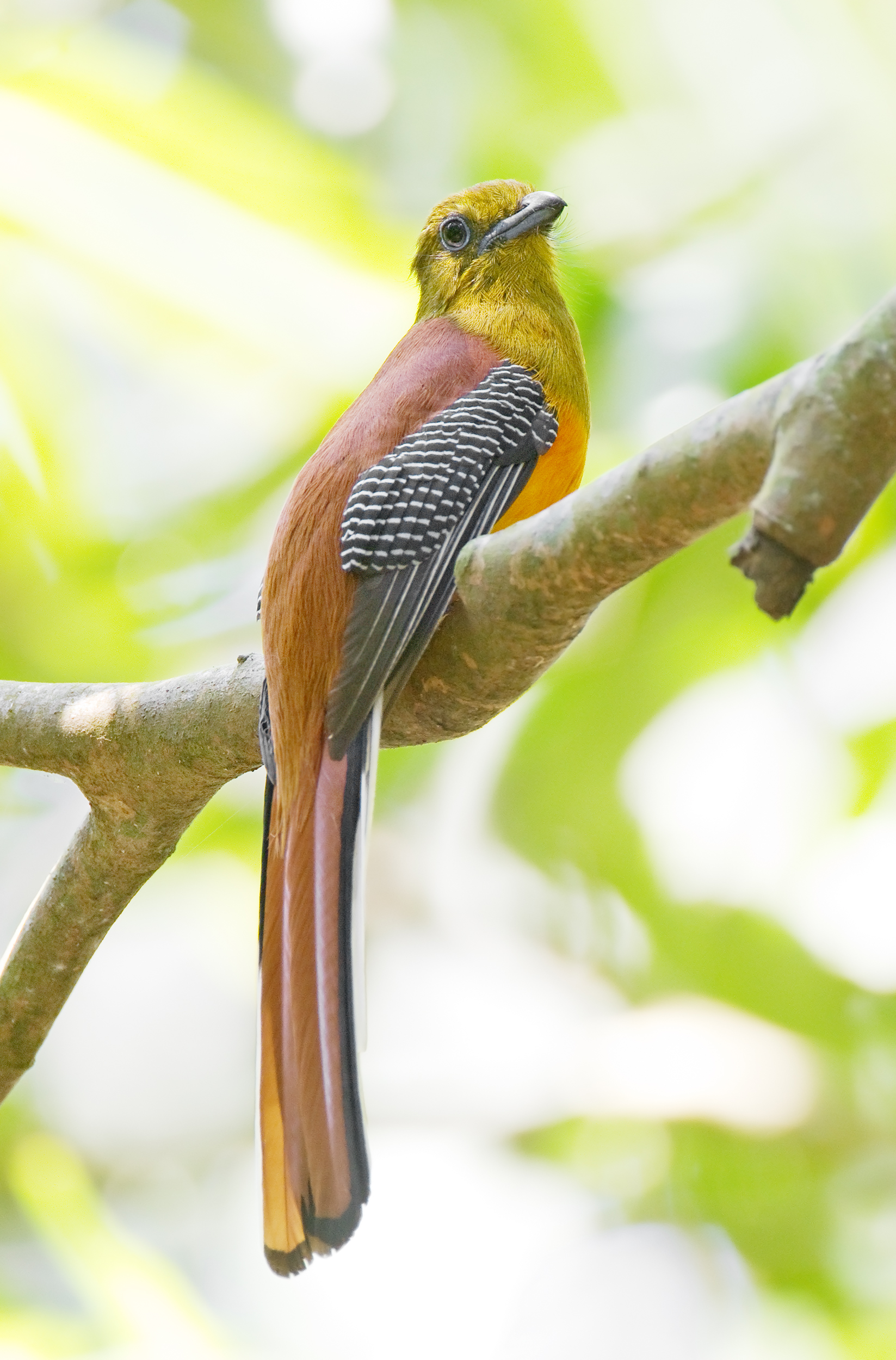
Orange-breasted trogon

and 30 species of non-passerine from 25 families, represented by one species:

- Accipiter
- Arborophila
- Asian koel
- Brown wood owl
- Caprimulgus
- Chinese francolin
- Collared owlet
- Common emerald dove
- Common kingfisher
- Eurasian hoopoe
- Gallopheasant
- Greater coucal
- Great hornbill
- Green-billed malkoha
- Grey-capped pygmy woodpecker
- Himalayan swiftlet
- Mountain imperial pigeon
- Orange-breasted trogon
- Pacific swift
- Pale-capped pigeon
- Red-breasted parakeet
- Red-collared dove
- Thick-billed green pigeon
- White-throated kingfisher
- Zebra dove

Reptiles

- Asiatic softshell turtle
- Bengal monitor
- Mediterranean tortoise

== Location ==
Wang Pong–Chon Daen Non-hunting Area in overview PARO 11 (Phitsanulok)

30) Wang Pong–Chon Daen N.H.A. in overview PARO 11 (Phitsanulok)

	Non-hunting area	17	Ban Yang	18	Bo Pho Thi–Pak Thong Chai
19	Dong Khlo-Huai Kapo	20	Huai Phueng-Wang Yao	21	Khao Kho
22	Khao Noi–Khao Pradu	23	Khao Phanom Thong	24	Khao Yai–Khao Na Pha Tang and Khao Ta Phrom
25	Phu San Khiao	26	Phutthabat Chon Daen	27	Song Khwae
28	Tha Daeng	29	Tham Pha Tha Phon	30	Wang Pong–Chon Daen
	Wildlife sanctuary				
11	Mae Charim	12	Nam Pat	13	Phu Khat
14	Phu Miang–Phu Thong	15	Phu Pha Daeng	16	Tabo–Huai Yai
	National park			1	Khao Kho
2	Khwae Noi	3	Lam Nam Nan	4	Nam Nao
5	Namtok Chat Trakan	6	Phu Hin Rong Kla	7	Phu Soi Dao
8	Tat Mok	9	Thung Salaeng Luang	10	Ton Sak Yai

== See also ==
- List of protected areas of Thailand
- DNP - Wang Pong–Chon Daen Non-hunting Area
- List of Protected Areas Regional Offices of Thailand
