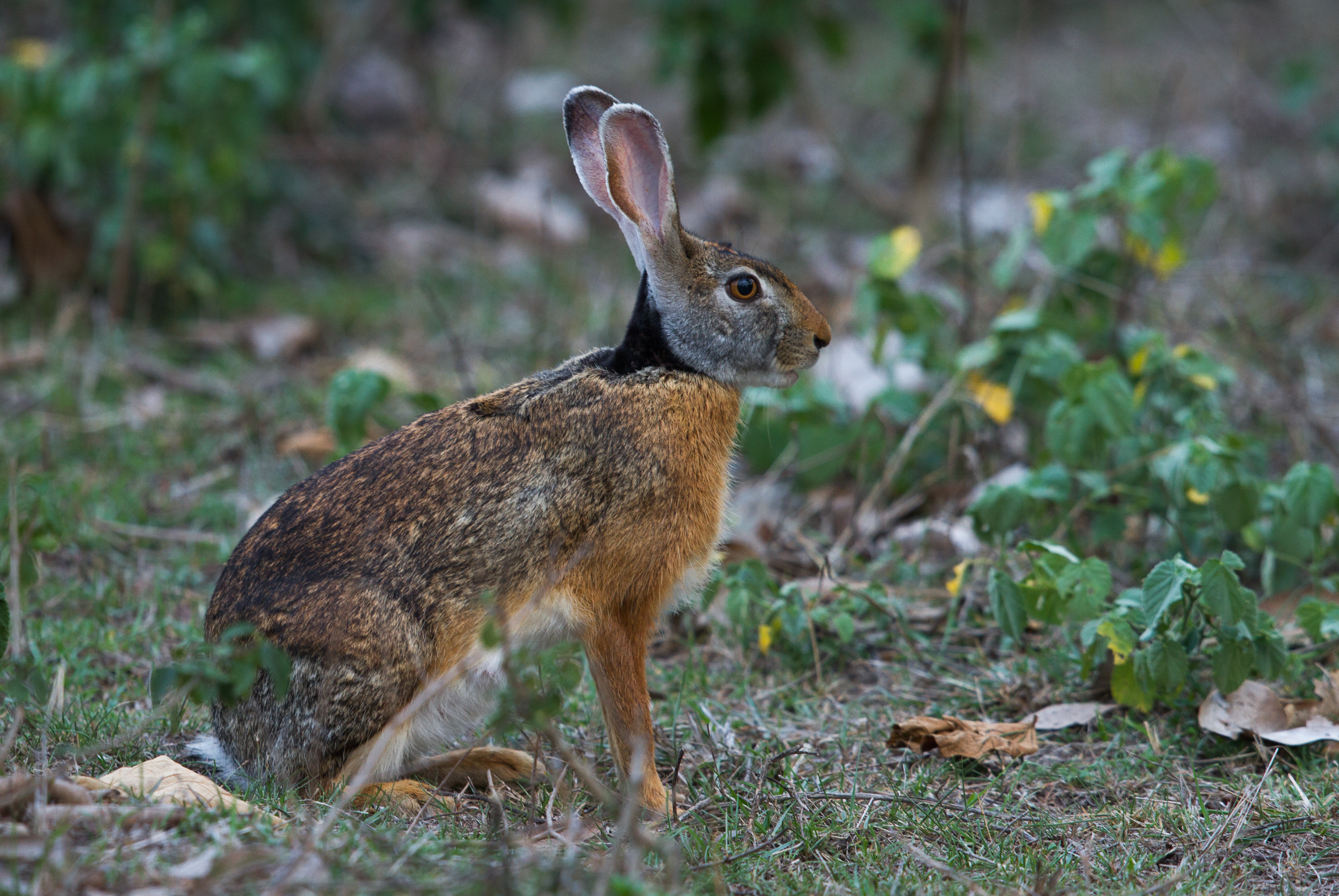

Conservation status
- Least Concern (IUCN 3.1)

Scientific classification
- Kingdom: Animalia
- Phylum: Chordata
- Class: Mammalia
- Order: Lagomorpha
- Family: Leporidae
- Genus: Lepus
- Species: L. nigricollis

Binomial name
- Lepus nigricollis F. Cuvier, 1823

Subspecies
- List: Lepus nigricollis aryabertensis Hodgson, 1844; Lepus nigricollis cutchensis Kloss, 1918; Lepus nigricollis dayanus Blanford, 1874; Lepus nigricollis joongshaiensis Murray, 1884; Lepus nigricollis macrotus Hodgson, 1840; Lepus nigricollis mahadeva Wroughton & Ryley, 1913; Lepus nigricollis nigricollis F. Cuvier, 1823; Lepus nigricollis rajput Wroughton, 1917; Lepus nigricollis ruficaudatus Geoffroy, 1826; Lepus nigricollis sadiya Kloss, 1918; Lepus nigricollis simcoxi Wroughton, 1912; Lepus nigricollis singhala Wroughton, 1915; Lepus nigricollis tytleri Tytler, 1854
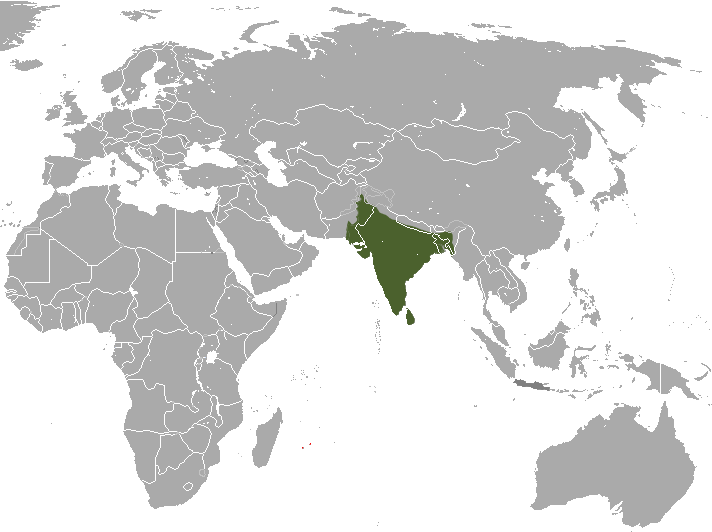
- Indian hare range (green – native, red – introduced, dark grey – origin uncertain)

= Indian hare =

Species of mammal

The Indian hare (Lepus nigricollis), also known as the black-naped hare, is a common species of hare native to the Indian subcontinent, and Java. Its habitat in Java is in rocky highlands.

== Description ==
The Indian hare is of medium size compared to other hares. Towards the southern parts of its range, individuals are notably larger. Its fur color is a mix of black and rufous, with the rufous color being especially present on the legs and breast of the hare. The hare's underside, including that of its tail, is white. The tail is brown on top. It has a head and body length of 33 to 53 cm (13 to 21 in), 8 to 12 cm (3.1 to 4.7 in)-long ears, large, well-furred hind feet that measure from 8.5 to 11.5 cm (3.3 to 4.5 in), and a rather long tail of about 6.4 cm (2.5 in). Adults can weigh 1.8–3.6 kg (4.0–7.9 lb).

The subspecies of Indian hare may display some distinguishing features. The nominate subspecies, L. n. nigricollis, has a black rather than brown tail, and the back of its neck has a distinctive black patch of fur. The fur of L. n. dayanus is paler, tending towards yellow. L. n. ruficaudatus is very similar to L. n. nigricollis, but the tail and neck patch are rufous and dark brown rather than black.

== Distribution and habitat ==
The Indian hare inhabits open grassy areas, cultivated plains, semi-arid and arid plains, and hills throughout the Indian subcontinent and Sri Lanka.

== Behaviour and ecology ==
Its activity pattern has been defined as crepuscular and nocturnal.

== Introductions ==
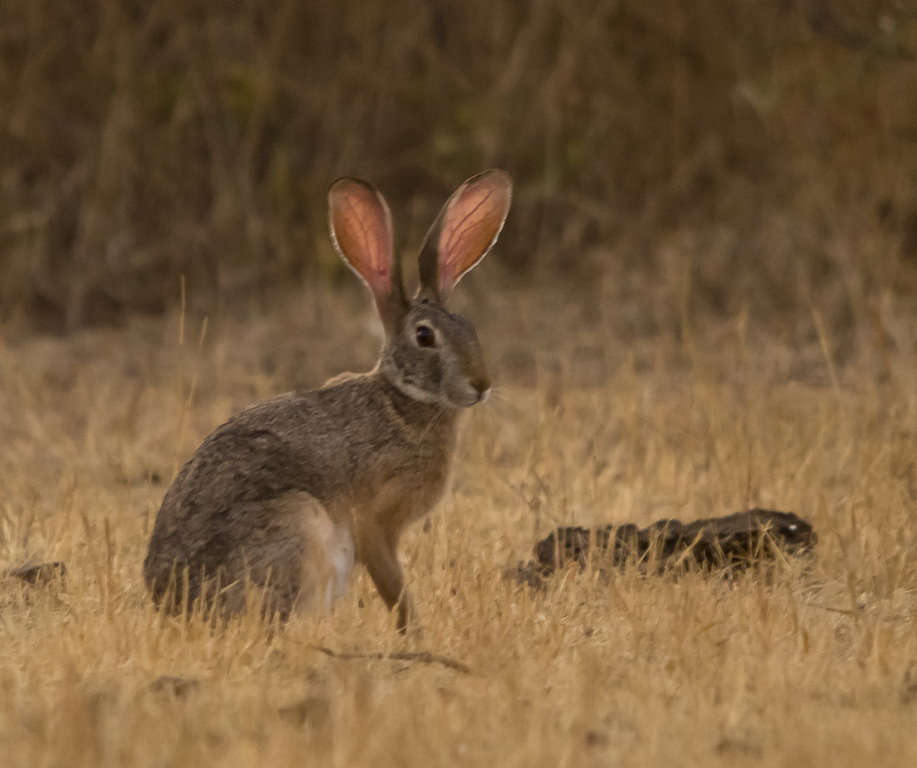
Indian hare in Rajkot

It has been introduced to Madagascar, Comoro Islands, Andaman Islands, Western New Guinea, Papua New Guinea, Seychelles, Mayotte, Mauritius and Réunion.
