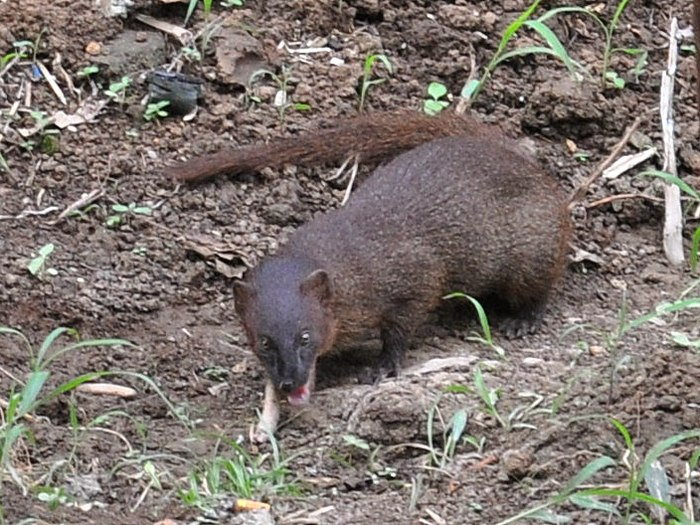

Conservation status
- Least Concern (IUCN 3.1)

Scientific classification
- Kingdom: Animalia
- Phylum: Chordata
- Class: Mammalia
- Order: Carnivora
- Family: Herpestidae
- Genus: Urva
- Species: U. javanica

Binomial name
- Urva javanica (É. Geoffroy Saint-Hilaire, 1818)

Subspecies
- U. j. javanica U. j. exilis U. j. orientalis U. j. peninsulae U. j. perakensis U. j. rafflesii U. j. rubifrons U. j. siamensis U. j. tjerapai
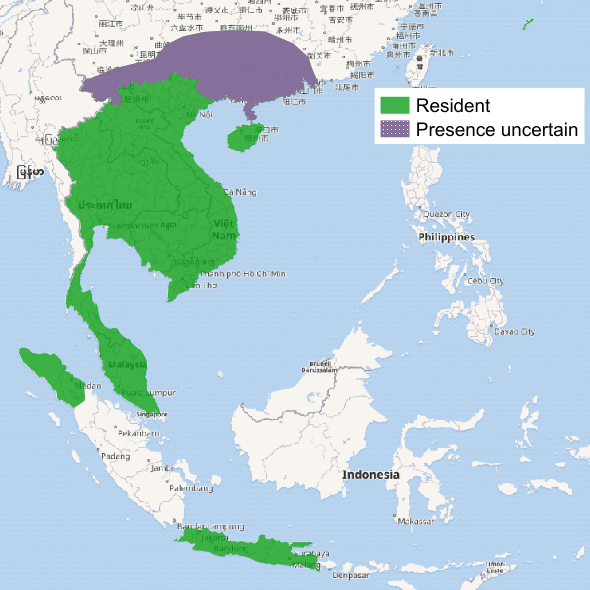
- Javan mongoose range

= Javan mongoose =

Species of mongoose from Asia

The Javan mongoose (Urva javanica) is a mongoose species native to Southeast Asia.

== Taxonomy ==
Ichneumon javanicus was the scientific name proposed by Étienne Geoffroy Saint-Hilaire in 1818. It was later classified in the genus Herpestes, but all Asian mongooses are now thought to belong in the genus Urva.

In the 19th and 20th centuries, several zoological specimens were described, which are now considered subspecies:

- Herpestes exilis by Paul Gervais in 1841 was a specimen from Tourane in Vietnam.
- Herpestes rafflesii by John Anderson in 1875 was a specimen from Sumatra.
- Mungos rubifrons by Joel Asaph Allen in 1909 were eight adult specimens collected around Wuzhi Mountain in Hainan Island, China.
- Mungos exilis peninsulae by Ernst Schwarz in 1910 was a skin and a skull of a mongoose collected in Bangkok.
- Mungos siamensis by Cecil Boden Kloss in 1917 was a skin of an adult female mongoose collected in northern Thailand.
- Mungos parakensis by Kloss in 1917 was a skin and a skull of an adult female mongoose from the vicinity of Taiping, Perak in Peninsular Malaysia.
- Herpestes javanicus tjerapai by Henri Jacob Victor Sody in 1949 was an adult male mongoose collected in Aceh Province, Sumatra.

The small Indian mongoose (U. auropunctata) was once considered to be a subspecies of the Javan mongoose. Genetic analysis of hair and tissue samples from 18 Javan and small Indian mongooses revealed that they form two clades and are distinct species. The Salween River in Myanmar is probably a barrier between the two species. Analysis of mitochondrial DNA of Urva species revealed that the Javan mongoose forms a sister group with the Indian grey mongoose (U. edwardsii). The Javan mongoose probably evolved about 0.5 million years ago in the middle Miocene.

== Description ==
The Javan mongoose's fur is ferruginous to sepia and rich tawny brown on the back. It has short hairs on the ears. Its tail is tapering.

== Distribution and habitat ==
The Javan mongoose is native to Myanmar, Thailand, Cambodia, Vietnam, Laos, Peninsular Malaysia and the Indonesian islands of Sumatra and Java, where it lives up to an elevation of 1,800 m (5,900 ft). Its presence is uncertain in China. In Thailand, the Javan mongoose was photographed by camera traps in a variety of habitats, including degraded mixed deciduous forest, dry evergreen and dry dipterocarp forests, as well as in abandoned plantations and pineapple fields.

=== Invasive species ===
In Europe, this species has been included since 2016 in the list of invasive alien species of Union concern. This means that this species cannot be imported, bred, transported, commercialized, or intentionally released into the environment in the whole of the European Union.

== Behaviour and ecology ==
The Javan mongoose is mostly solitary; males sometimes form social groups and share burrows. Females are pregnant for up to 49 days and give birth to a litter of 2–5 young. Males can potentially become sexually mature at the age of 4 months.

Javan mongooses eat mostly insects but are opportunistic feeders and will eat crabs, frogs, spiders, scorpions, snakes, small mammals, birds, and eggs.

== Threats ==
In Sumatra, the Javan mongoose is wild-caught for the pet trade. It was the most commonly offered species at wildlife markets in Medan during surveys between 1997 and 2001. Despite being hunted heavily in Laos, Thailand, and Vietnam, it is commonly seen in suburban areas.
