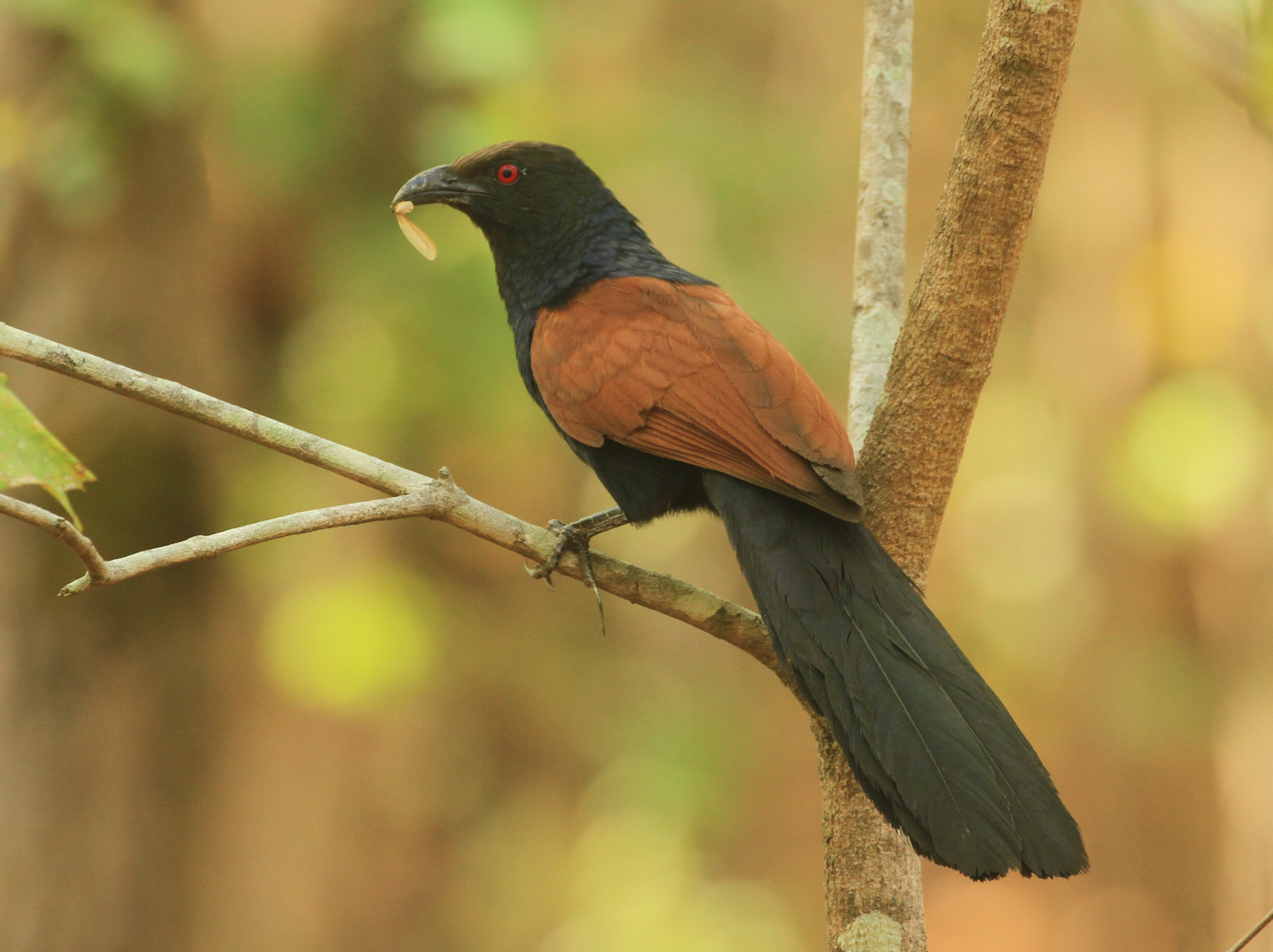

Conservation status
- Least Concern (IUCN 3.1)

Scientific classification
- Kingdom: Animalia
- Phylum: Chordata
- Class: Aves
- Order: Cuculiformes
- Family: Cuculidae
- Genus: Centropus
- Species: C. sinensis

Binomial name
- Centropus sinensis (Stephens, 1815)
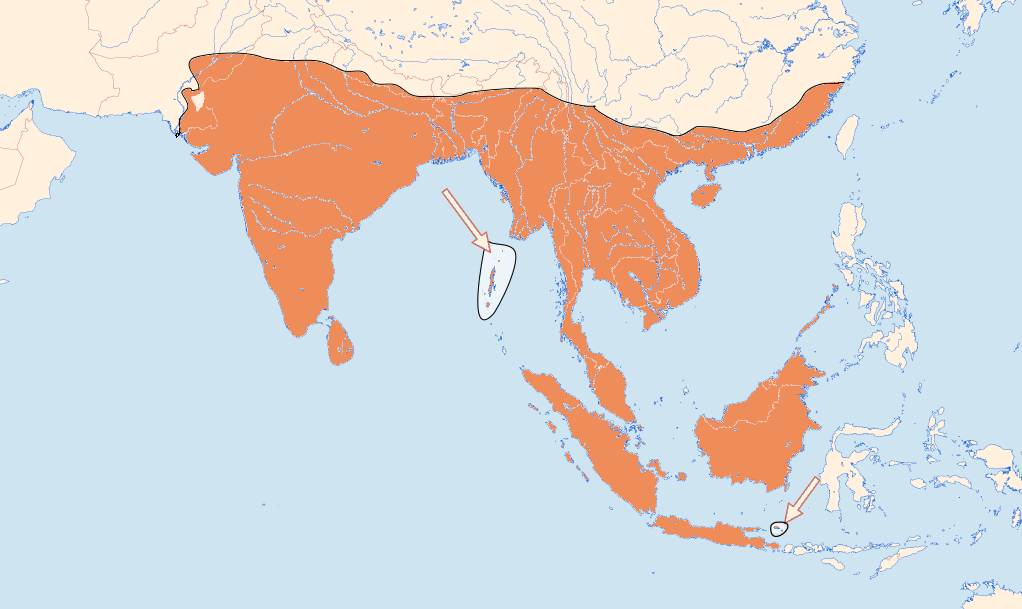
- native range

= Greater coucal =

Species of bird

The greater coucal or crow pheasant (Centropus sinensis), is a large non-parasitic member of the cuckoo order of birds, the Cuculiformes. A widespread resident in the Indian subcontinent and Southeast Asia, it is divided into several subspecies, some being treated as full species. They are large, crow-like with a long tail and coppery brown wings and found in a wide range of habitats from jungle to cultivation and urban gardens. They are weak fliers, and are often seen clambering about in vegetation or walking on the ground as they forage for insects, eggs and nestlings of other birds. They have a familiar deep resonant call which is associated with omens in many parts of its range.

== Description ==
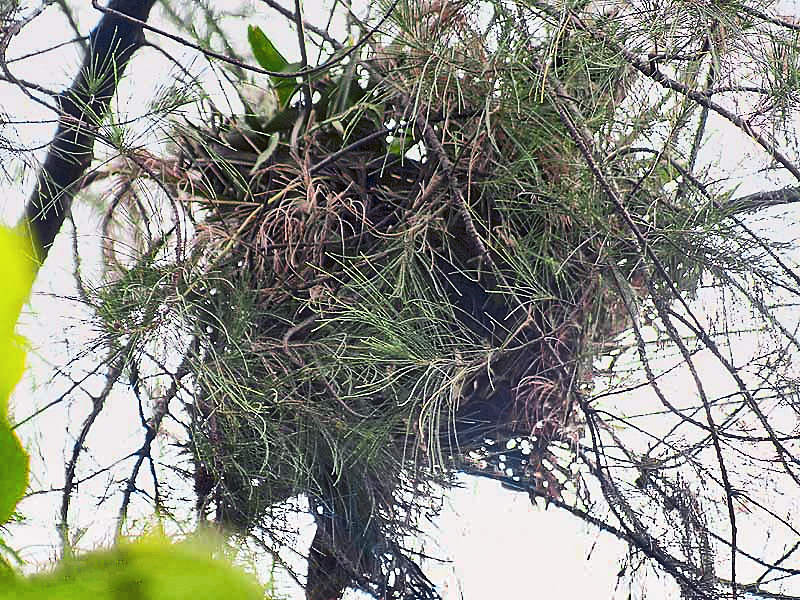
A nest near Kolkata, India

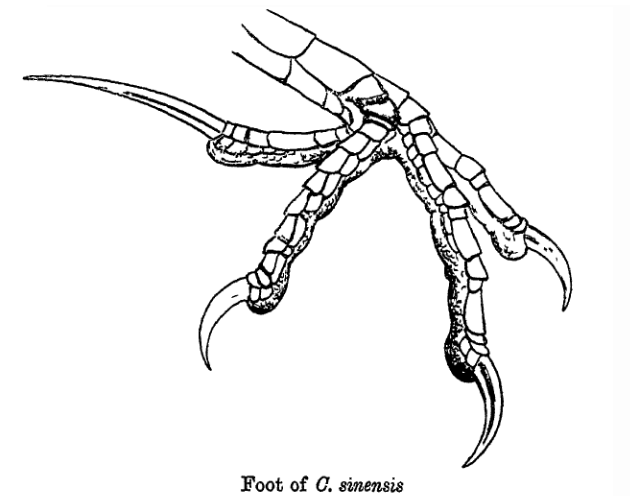
The long and straight hind claw is characteristic of the genus

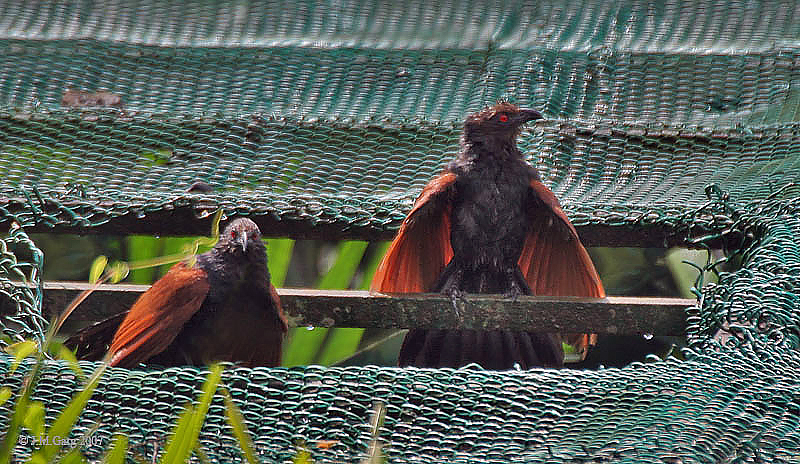
Sunning (West Bengal, India)

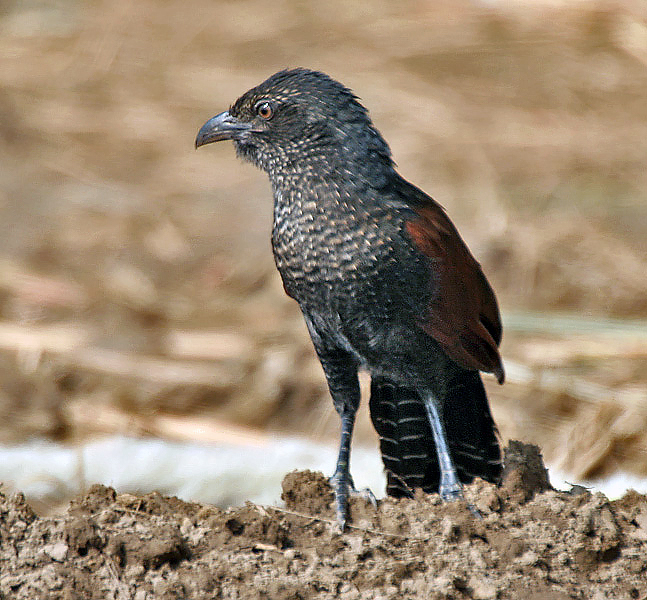
Immature of nominate race showing barred/speckled underside. Haryana, India

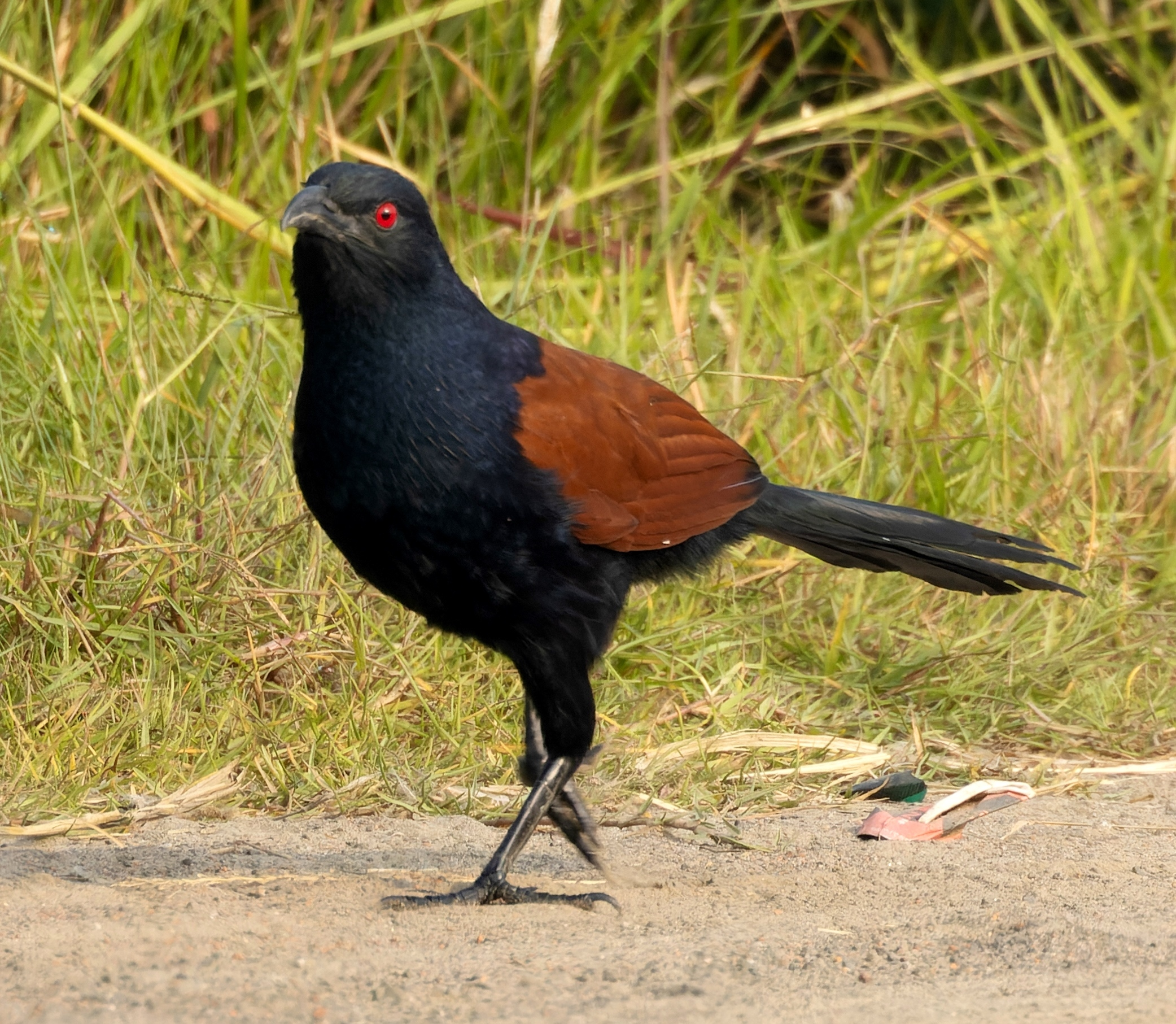
Adult bird near Kolkata, India

This is a large species of cuckoo at 48 cm. The head is black, upper mantle and underside are black glossed with purple. The back and wings are chestnut brown. There are no pale shaft streaks on the coverts. The eyes are ruby red. Juveniles are duller black with spots on the crown and there are whitish bars on the underside and tail. There are several geographic races and some of these populations are sometimes treated as full species. Earlier treatments included the brown coucal (C. (s.) andamanensis) under this name. Rasmussen & Anderton (2005) suggest that the race parroti may be a full species – the southern coucal which is found in peninsular India (northern boundary unclear). The race intermedius of the Assam and Bangladesh region is smaller than the nominate race found in the sub-Himalayan zone. Songs of the races are said to vary considerably. Race parroti of southern India has a black head and the underparts glossed blue and has the forehead, face and throat more brownish. The sexes are similar in plumage but females are slightly larger.

Leucistic specimens have been observed.

=== Subspecies and distribution ===
The nominate race is found from the Indus Valley through the sub-Himalayan and Gangetic plains to Nepal, Assam and the Bhutan foothills into southern China (Guangxi, Zhejiang, Fujian).

- Race parroti Stresemann, 1913 — found in Peninsular India (Maharashtra, Madhya Pradesh, Orissa and southwards). The upper back is black and the juvenile has unbarred wings.
- Race intermedius Hume, 1873 — smaller in size and found in Bangladesh, west Cachar and into Myanmar and the Chin Hills into China (Yunnan, Hainan), Thailand, Indochina and the northern part of the Malay Peninsula.
- Race bubutus Horsfield, 1821 — found in the southern part of the Malay Peninsula into the islands of Sumatra, Nias, Mentawai Islands, Java, Bali, Borneo, western Philippines (Balabac, Cagayan Sulu and Palawan). The wing is paler rufous in this race.
- Race anonymus Stresemann, 1913 — found in the southwestern Philippines (Basilan, Sulu Islands) and is shorter and darker winged than bubutus.
- Race kangeangensis Vorderman, 1893 — found in the Kangean Islands. This has pale and dark plumage phases.

The young when hatched have black skin and white hairy feathers (termed as trichoptiles) forming a fringe over the eye and beak. The centre of the belly is pinkish and the upper mandible is black with a pink edge. The iris is brown, gape yellow and feet dark brown-gray. The juvenile of race parroti is unmarked dull black on the underside (contra barred in the northern races) and much darker, dusky chestnut on the wings. Race bubutus found in Southeast Asia has a distinct call. Individuals from the Western Ghats are very similar in size to the lesser coucal Centropus bengalensis but the latter has a stubbier bill, shorter tail, wing tips extending beyond the tertials and a chestnut wing lining, dark eyes and a tail with green/bronze sheen. Females of the race parroti develop dusky or sooty wing coverts between November and January and the northern boundary of the race is along the Punjab plains where it forms intermediates with the northern forms.

== Behaviour and ecology ==
The greater coucal is a large bird which takes a wide range of insects, caterpillars, snails and small vertebrates such as the saw-scaled vipers. They are also known to eat bird eggs, nestlings, fruits and seeds. In Tamil Nadu they were found to feed predominantly on snails Helix vittata. They are also known to feed on the toxic fruits of Cascabela thevetia (Yellow Oleander). In oil palm cultivation, they have been noted as an avian pest due to their habit of eating the fleshy mesocarps of the ripe fruits.

They sunbathe in the mornings singly or in pairs on the top of vegetation with their wings spread out. The territory of a nesting pair has been found in southern India to be 0.9 to 7.2 ha (mean 3.8 ha). They are most active in the warm hours of the morning and in the late afternoon.

The calls are a booming low coop-coop-coops repeated and with variations and some duets between individuals. When duetting the female has a lower pitched call. Other calls include a rapid rattling "lotok, lotok ..." and a harsh scolding "skeeaaaw" and a hissing threat call.

=== Breeding ===
The breeding season is after the monsoon in southern India but varies in other parts of its range but chiefly June to September. Greater coucals are monogamous, and the courtship display involves chases on the ground and the male brings food gifts for the female. The female lowers her tail and droops her wings to signal acceptance. The nest is built mostly by the male over about three to eight days. The nest is a deep cup with a dome in dense vegetation inside tangles of creepers, bamboo clump or Pandanus crowns. They can be built as high as 6m above the ground and the typical clutch is 3–5 eggs. The eggs (of size 36–28 mm weighing 14.8 g ) are chalky white with a yellow glaze when laid that wears off. Both the male and the female take part in nest building. They lay 2 to 4 eggs that hatch after 15–16 days of incubation. The chicks take 18–22 days to fledge. A study in southern India found that 77% of the eggs hatched and 67% fledged. Nests with eggs were sometimes abandoned or marauded by the Indian jungle crow Corvus macrorhynchos culminatus.

Haemosporidia closely related to those that cause malaria have been found in their red blood cells. One species, Haemoproteus centropi, is described from cuckoos such as Clamator jacobinus and Centropus sinensis and is spread by mosquitoes. Immature Haemaphysalis ticks have been found feeding on greater coucals.

== In culture ==
The bird is associated with many superstitions and beliefs. The deep calls are associated with spirits and omens. In Bengal, there was a belief that monocled cobras (known as keutia) had no males and that they mated with male greater coucals.

In British India, it was noted that new-recruits to India often mistook it for a pheasant and shot it to find it "evil flavoured" giving it the nickname of "Griff's pheasant".

The flesh was once eaten as a folk cure for tuberculosis and pulmonary ailments.

== Gallery ==
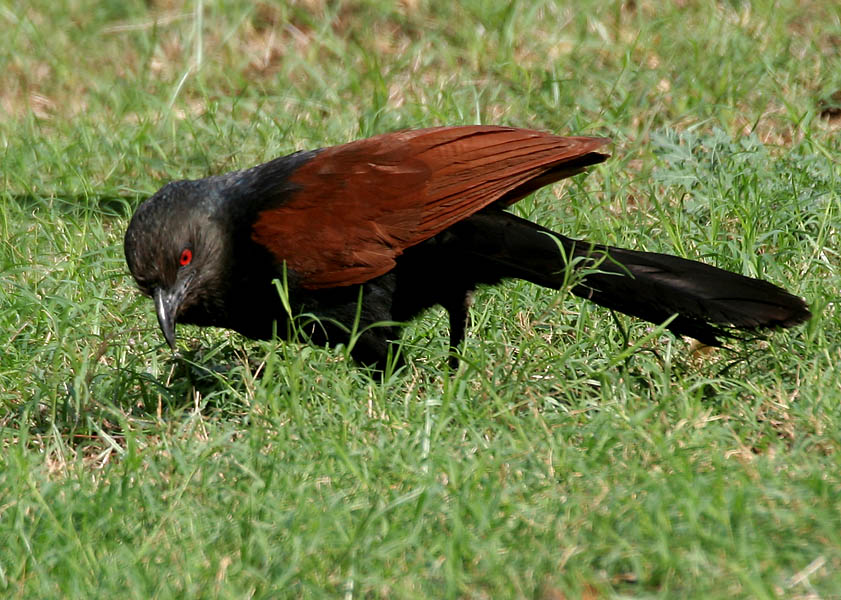
in Hyderabad, India

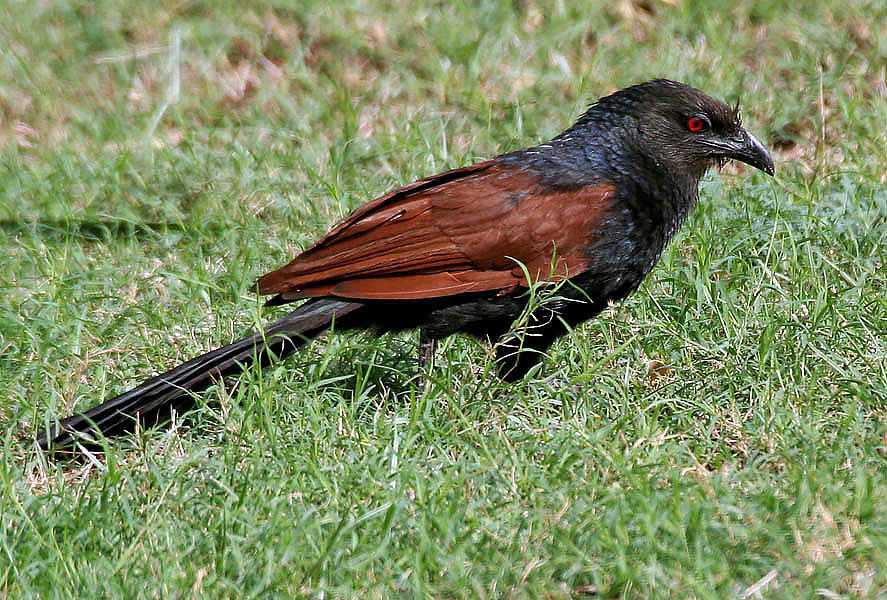
in Hyderabad, India

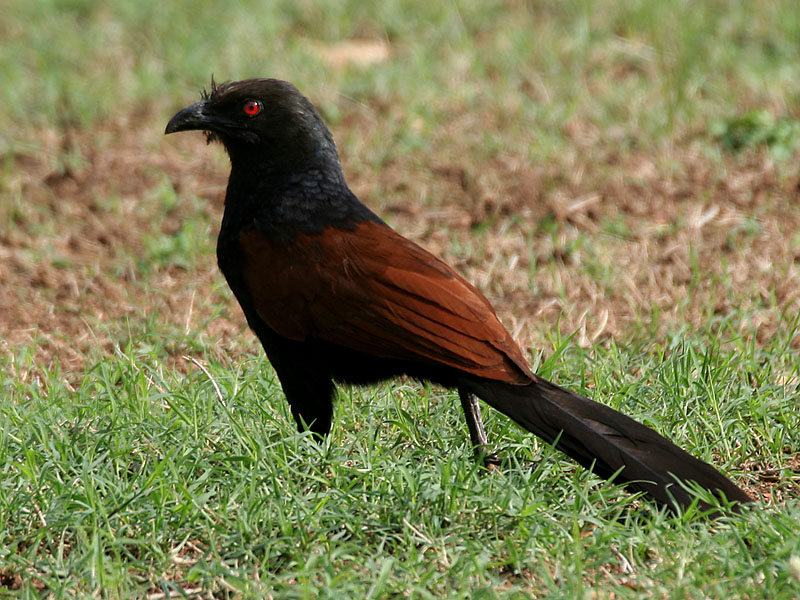
in Hyderabad, India

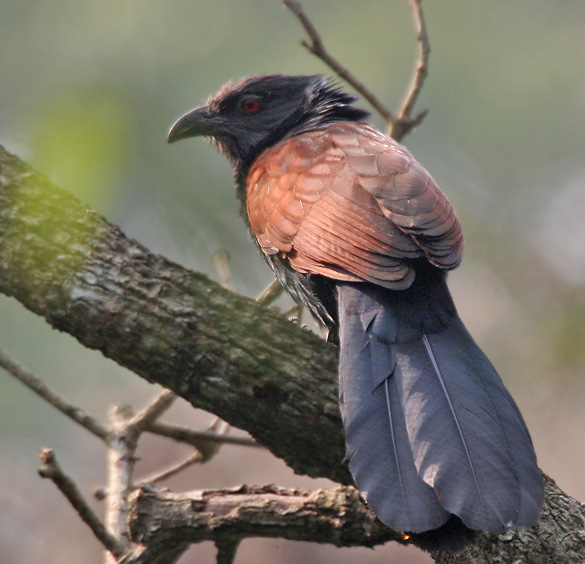
at Narendrapur near Kolkata, West Bengal, India

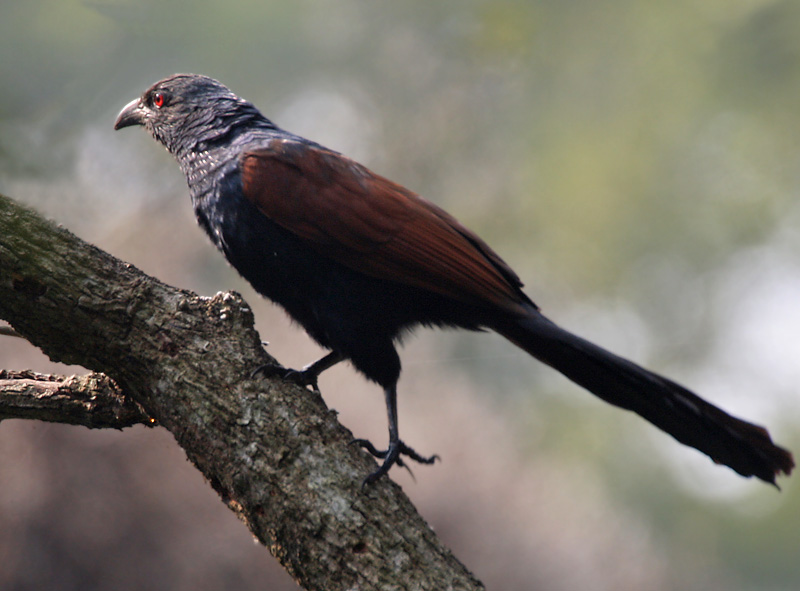
at Narendrapur near Kolkata, West Bengal, India

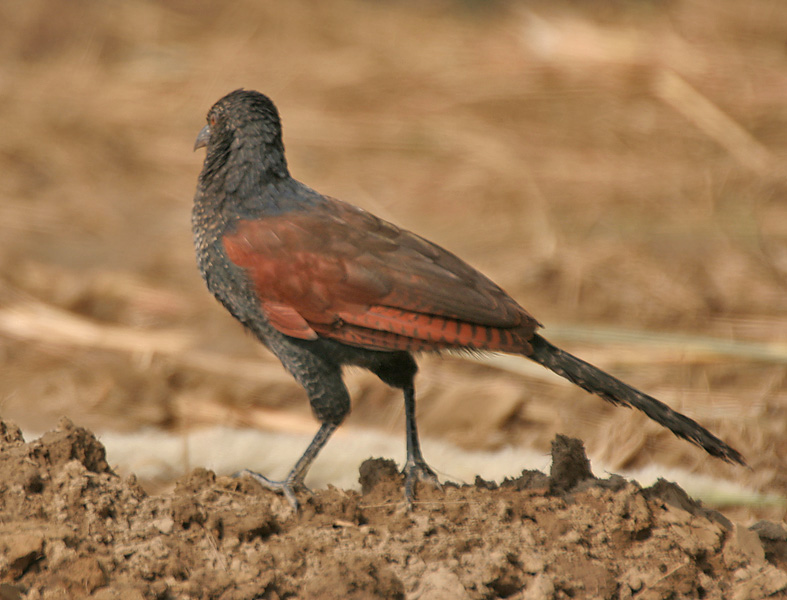
Immature at Hodal, Faridabad, Haryana, India

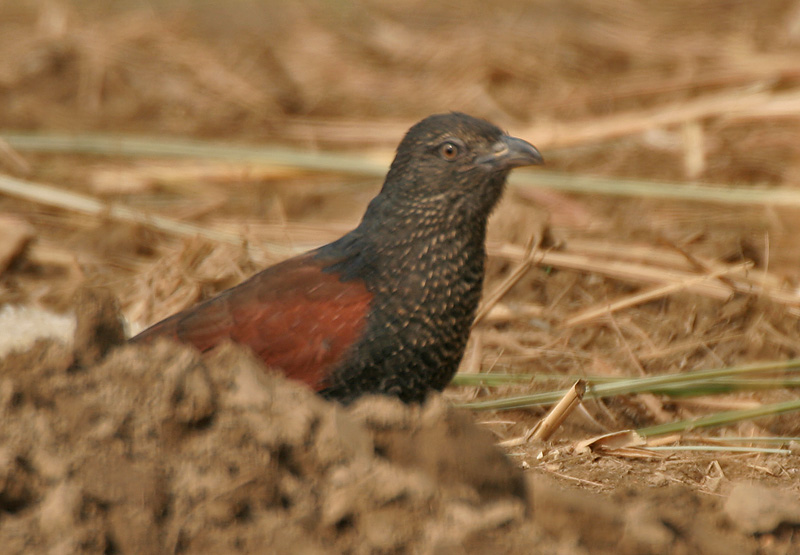
Immature at Hodal, Faridabad, Haryana, India

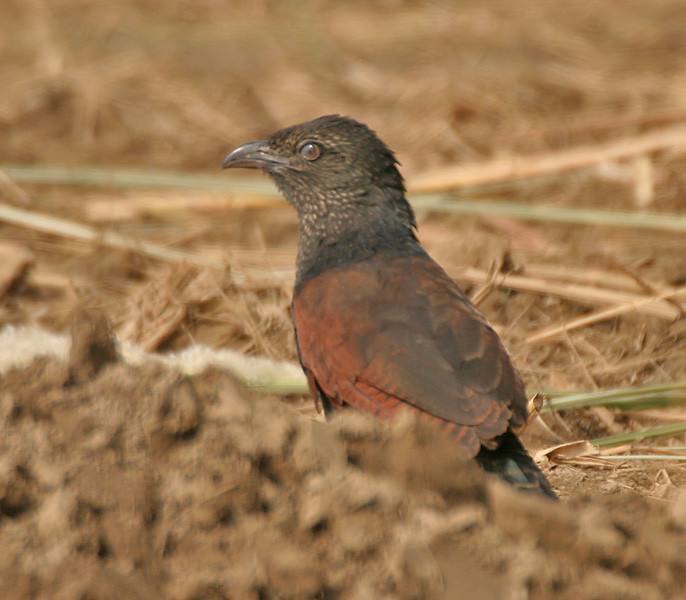
Immature at Hodal, Faridabad, Haryana, India

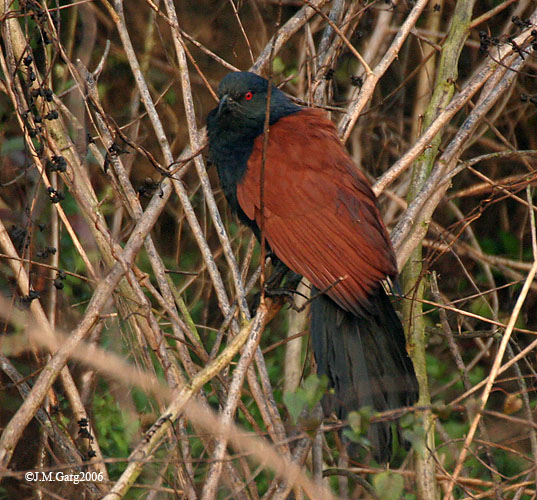
In Kolkata, West Bengal, India

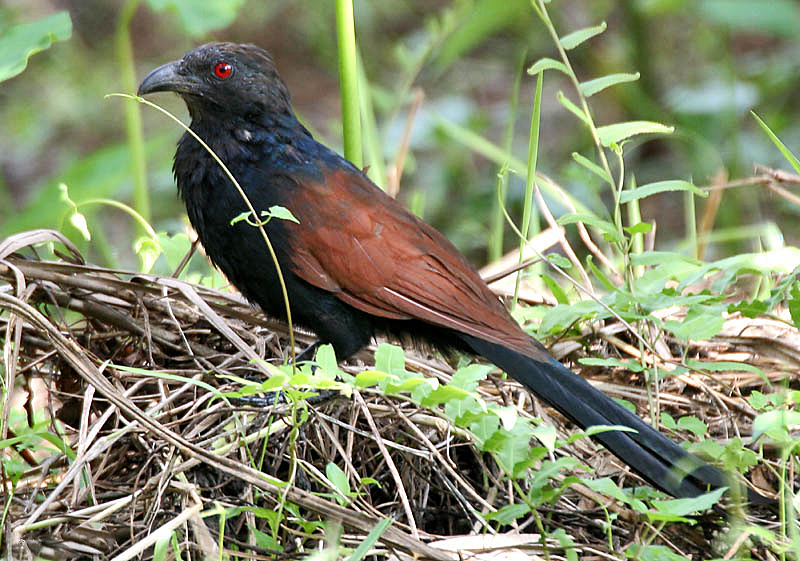
In Kolkata, West Bengal, India

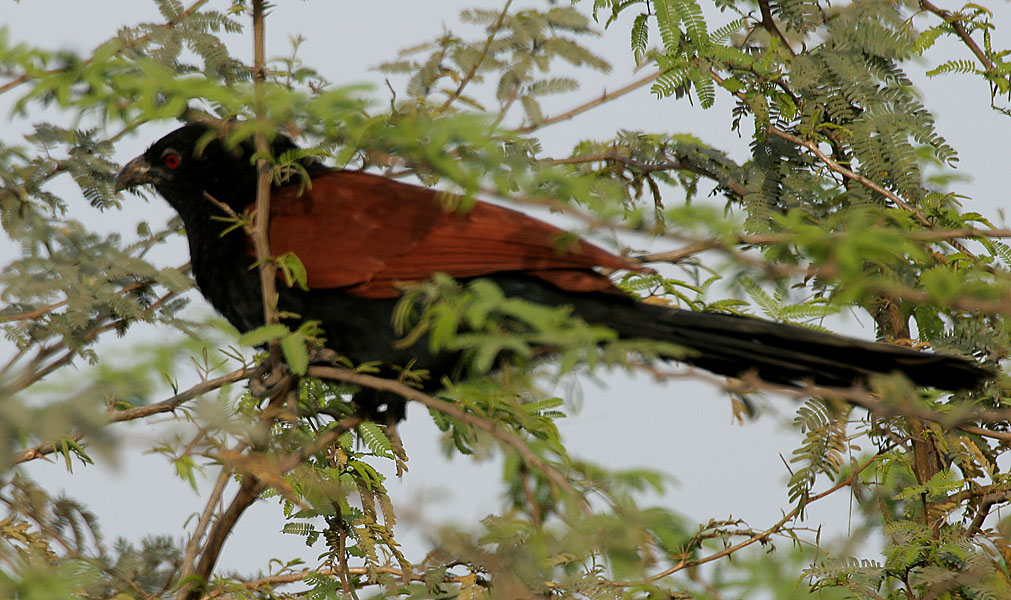
near Hodal, Faridabad, Haryana, India

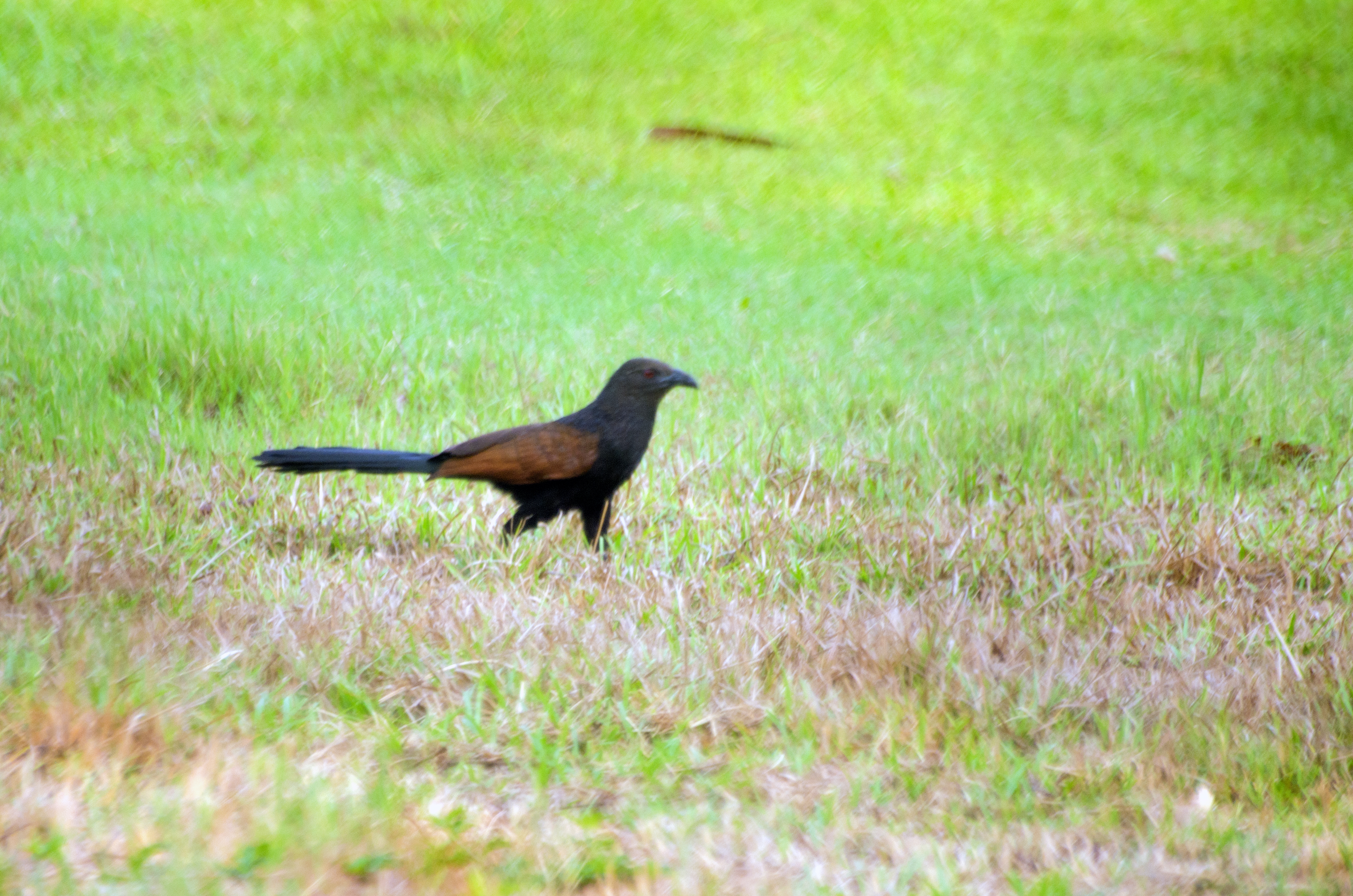
At Rabindra Sarobar, Kolkata

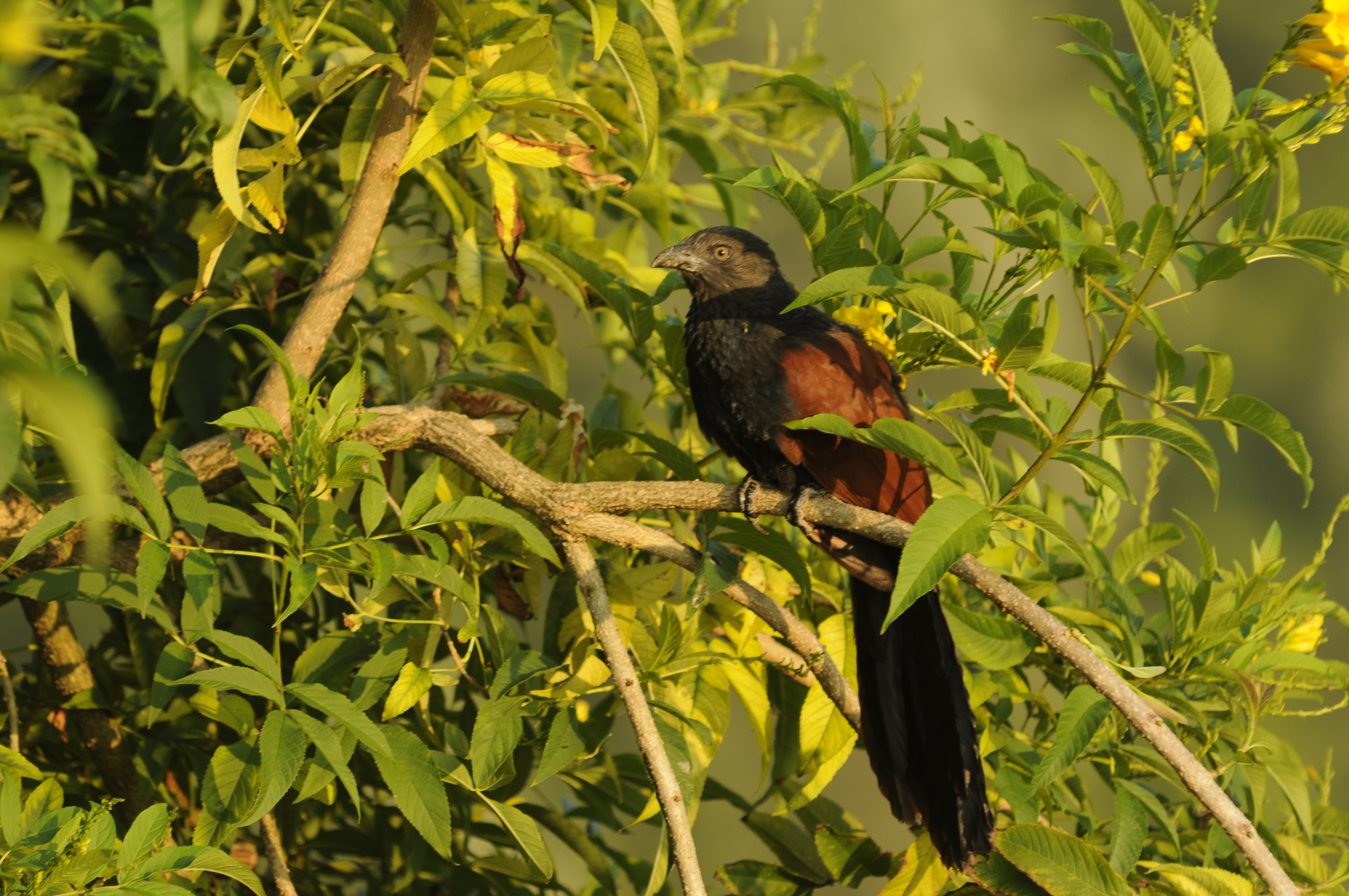
Perched on tree

== Other sources ==
- Bhujle, BV; Nadkarni, VB (1977) Steroid synthesizing cellular sites in the testis of Crow Pheasant Centropus sinensis (Stephens). Pavo 14(1&2), 61–64.
- Bhujle, BV; Nadkarni, VB (1980) Histological and histochemical observations on the adrenal gland of four species of birds, Dicrurus macrocercus (Vieillot), Centropus sinensis (Stephens), Sturnus pagodarum (Gmelin) and Columba livia (Gmelin). Zool. Beitrage 26(2):287–295.
- Khajuria, H (1975) The Crow-pheasant, Centropus sinensis (Stevens) (Aves: Cuculidae) of central and eastern Madhya Pradesh. All-India Congr. Zool. 3:42.
- Khajuria, H (1984) The Crow-Pheasant, Centropus sinensis (Stephens) (Aves: Cuculidae) of central and eastern Madhya Pradesh. Rec. Z.S.I. 81(1–2):89–93.
- Natarajan, V (1993). "Awakening, roosting and vocalisation behavioiur of the Southern Crow-Pheasant (Centropus sinensis) at Point Calimere, Tamil Nadu". In Verghese, A; Sridhar, S; Chakravarthy, AK (eds.). Bird Conservation: Strategies for the Nineties and Beyond. Ornithological Society of India, Bangalore. pp. 158–160.
- Natarajan, V (1990) The ecology of the Southern Crow-Pheasant Centropus sinensis parroti Stresemann (Aves: Cuculidae) at Point Calimere, Tamil Nadu. Ph.D. Dissertation, University of Bombay, Bombay.
