= Nam Nao National Park =

Natural area in northern Thailand

- อุทยานแห่งชาติน้ำหนาว
- IUCN category II (national park)
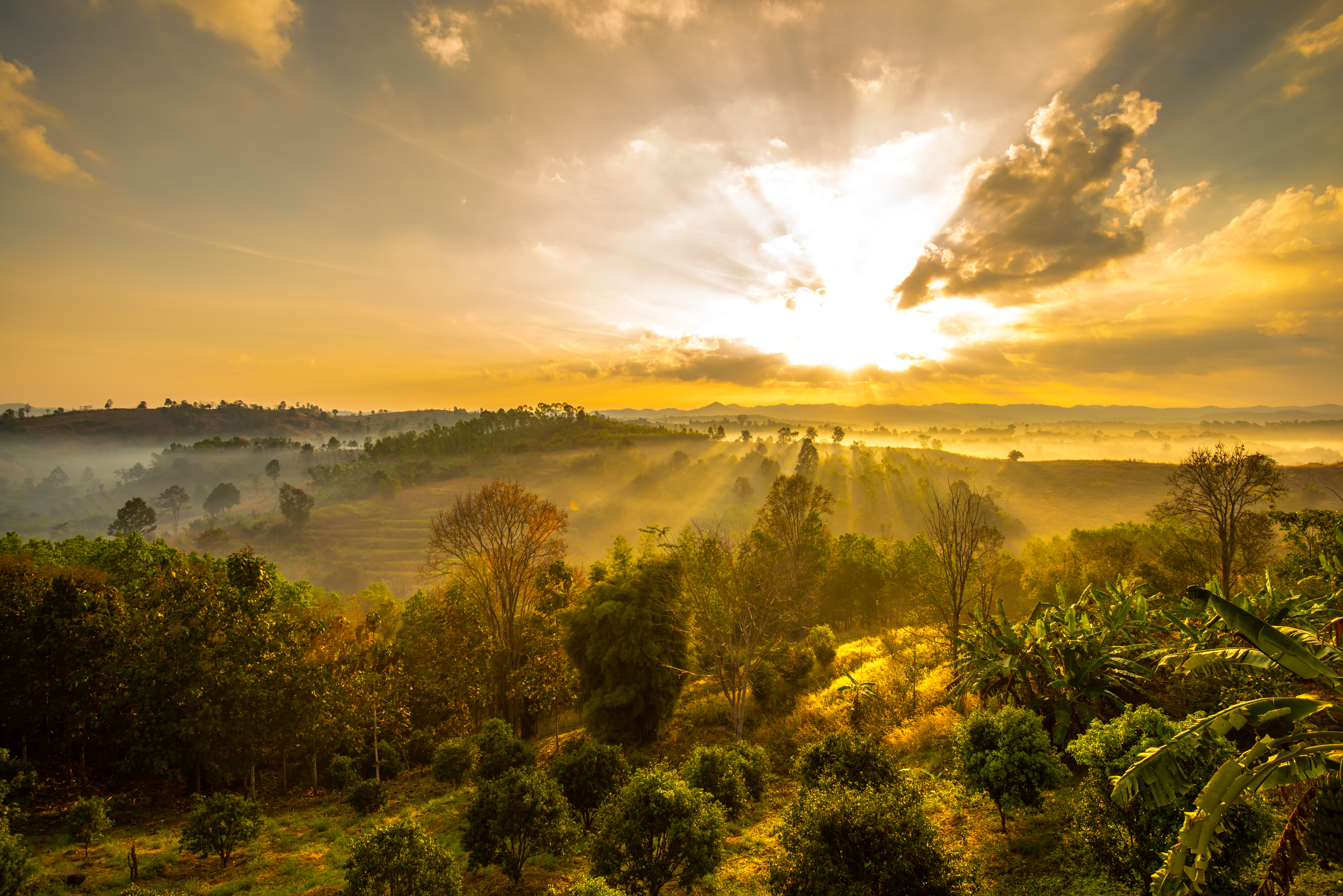
- Nam Nao National Park at sunrise

- Location within Thailand
- Location: Phetchabun Province, Thailand
- Coordinates: 16°44′01″N 101°33′47″E
- Area: 966 km^{2} (373 sq mi)
- Established: 4 May 1972
- Visitors: 31,840 (in 2019)
- Governing body: Department of National Parks, Wildlife and Plant Conservation

Nam Nao National Park (Thai: อุทยานแห่งชาติน้ำหนาว, RTGS: Utthayan Haeng Chat Nam Nao) is a protected area in Phetchabun Province in northern Thailand. The park is a large forest filled with pineries, grasslands, and jungle. The park is home to approximately 360 species of birds and 340 species of butterflies. The average annual temperature is 25 degrees Celsius (77°F). Between December and January temperatures drop to as low as 2-5 degrees Celsius (36-41°F). Nam Nao National Park is part of a Level I "tiger conservation unit" (TCU). It encompasses 1,000 square kilometres (390 sq mi).

== Geography ==
Nam Nao National Park with an area of 603,750 rai ~ 966 square kilometres (373 sq mi) is located in Lom Sak, Mueang Phetchabun and Nam Nao districts of Phetchabun province and Khon San district of Chaiyapum province. Most of the park consists of mountains covered with deciduous dipterocarp forest, hill evergreen forest, mixed deciduous forest, moist evergreen forest, pine forest and grasslands. High mountains in the Phetchabun Mountains include: Phu Kum Kao and Phu Pha Chit, also known as Phu Dan Eupong, the highest peak at 1,271 metres (4,170 ft) and form Isan's border with northern Thailand. The source of several rivers is in the park, which flows into the Chulabhorn reservoir.
The national park is neighbouring Phu Pha Man National Park and Phu Kradueng National Park to the north, abutting Pha Phueng Wildlife Sanctuary to the southeast and Phu Khiao Wildlife Sanctuary to the south, connected by Tat Mok National Park to the south and abutting Phu Pha Daeng Wildlife Sanctuary to the west.

== History ==
On 12 January 1970 the National Park Board took a decision to designate a national park. On 3 May 1972 the Revolutionary Council announced: determination of the Nam Nao forest area in Mueang Phetchabun district, Lom Sak district, Nam Nao district, Phetchabun province and Khon San district, Chaiyaphum province to be a national park.
The boundaries of the national park include also the area of Pak Chong Subdistrict and Tha Ibun Subdistrict of Lom Sak District, but they are not mentioned in the publication in the Government Gazette. So a Royal Decree, which mentions the two omitted subdistricts, was published in the Royal Gazette on 26 September 1982. Since 2002 this national park has been managed by region 11 (Phitsanulok)

== Flora ==
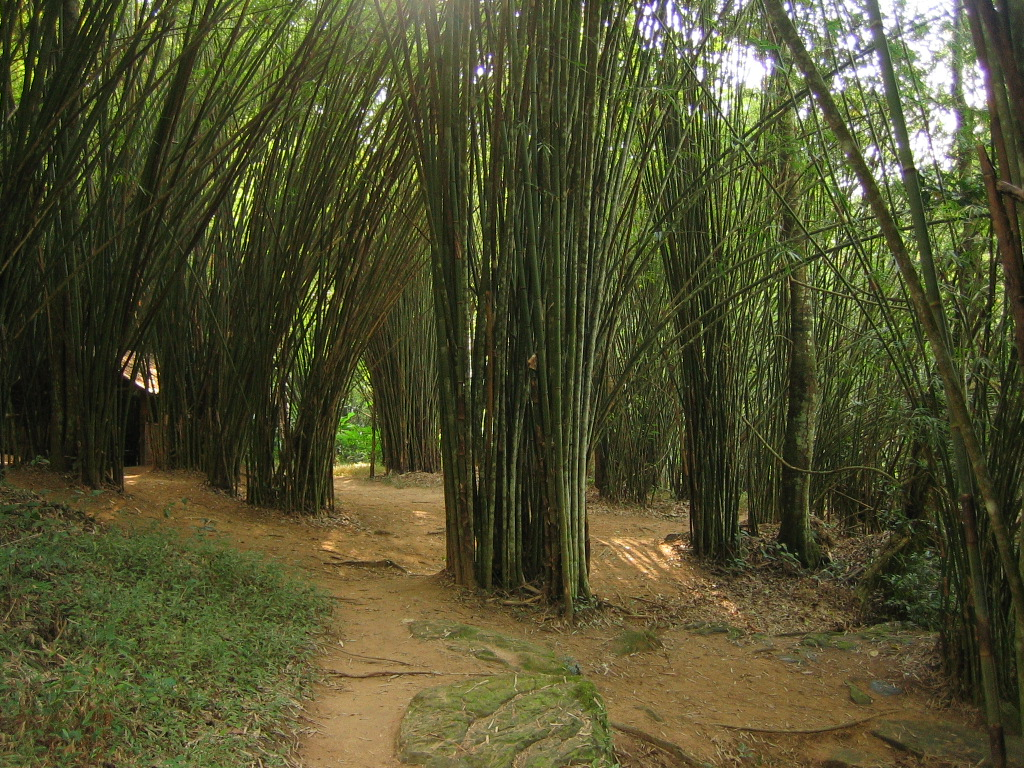
Bamboo, Nam Nao National Park

Plants in the park are:

- Arecaceae sp.
- Afzelia xylocarpa
- Artocarpus lacucha
- Bombax ceiba
- Buchanania lanzan
- Calamoideae sp.
- Craibiodendron stellatum
- Dalbergia oliveri
- Dipterocarpus alatus
- Dipterocarpus obtusifolius
- Gluta usitata
- Hopea odorata
- Lagerstroemia sp.
- Morinda citrifolia
- Ochna integerrima
- Pinus kesiya
- Pterocarpus macrocarpus
- Quercus sp.
- Shorea obtusa
- Shorea siamensis
- Terminalia elliptica
- Toona ciliata
- Trevesia palmata
- Xylia xylocarpa

Flowers at Nam Nao N.P. include:

- Aeginetia pedunculata
- Arundina graminifolia
- Curcuma.sp
- Globba obscura

A rare ground orchid is: Eulophia flava

== Fauna ==
The number of sightings in the park are:
Fifteen families of mammals, represented by one or two mammal species:

- Asian elephant
- Assam macaque
- Barking deer
- Black giant squirrel
- Burmese hare
- Chevrotain
- Gaur
- Golden jackal
- Leopard
- Malayan porcupine
- Marshall's horseshoe bat
- Sun bear
- Tiger
- White-handed gibbon
- Wild boar
- Yellow-throated marten

The park has approximately 360 species of birds, of which some 210 species of passerines from 40 families, represented by one bird species:

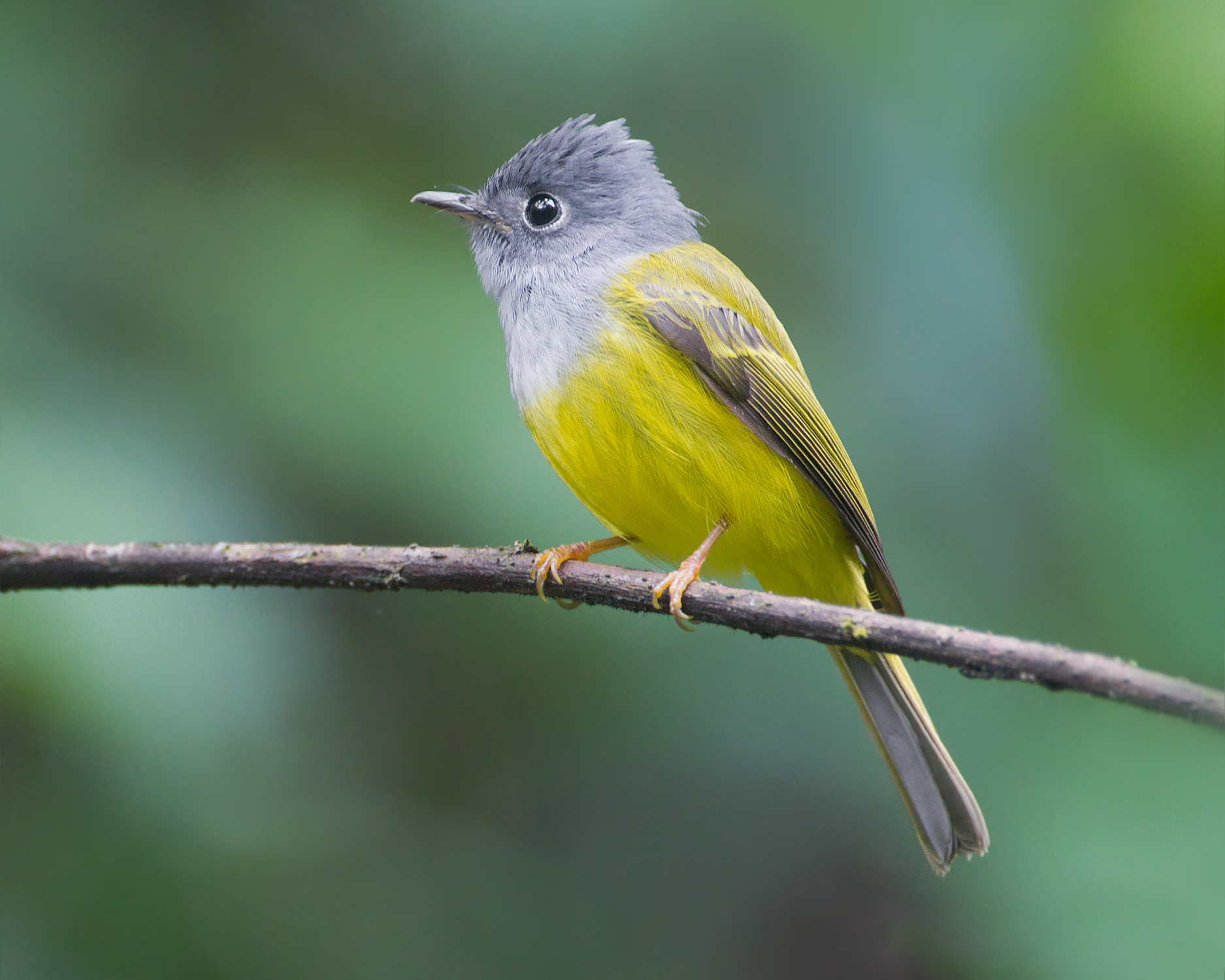
Grey-headed canary-flycatcher

- Abbott's babbler
- Ashy woodswallow
- Asian fairy-bluebird
- Asian stubtail
- Baikal bush warbler
- Banded broadbill
- Barn swallow
- Black-hooded oriole
- Black-naped monarch
- Black-throated laughingthrush
- Blue-winged leafbird
- Blyth's shrike-babbler
- Brown-cheeked fulvetta
- Common hill myna
- Common iora
- Eurasian tree sparrow
- Fire-breasted flowerpecker
- Greater racket-tailed drongo
- Greenish warbler
- Grey-backed shrike
- Grey-headed canary-flycatcher
- Grey wagtail
- Large woodshrike
- Malaysian pied fantail
- Orange-headed thrush
- Oriental skylark
- Plain prinia
- Red-billed blue magpie
- Red-whiskered bulbul
- Rusty-naped pitta
- Scaly-breasted munia
- Scarlet minivet
- Sultan tit
- Swinhoe's white-eye
- Thick-billed warbler
- Velvet-fronted nuthatch
- Verditer flycatcher
- White-browed scimitar babbler
- Yellow-breasted bunting
- Yellow-eyed babbler

of which some 150 species of non-passerines from 30 families, represented by one bird species:

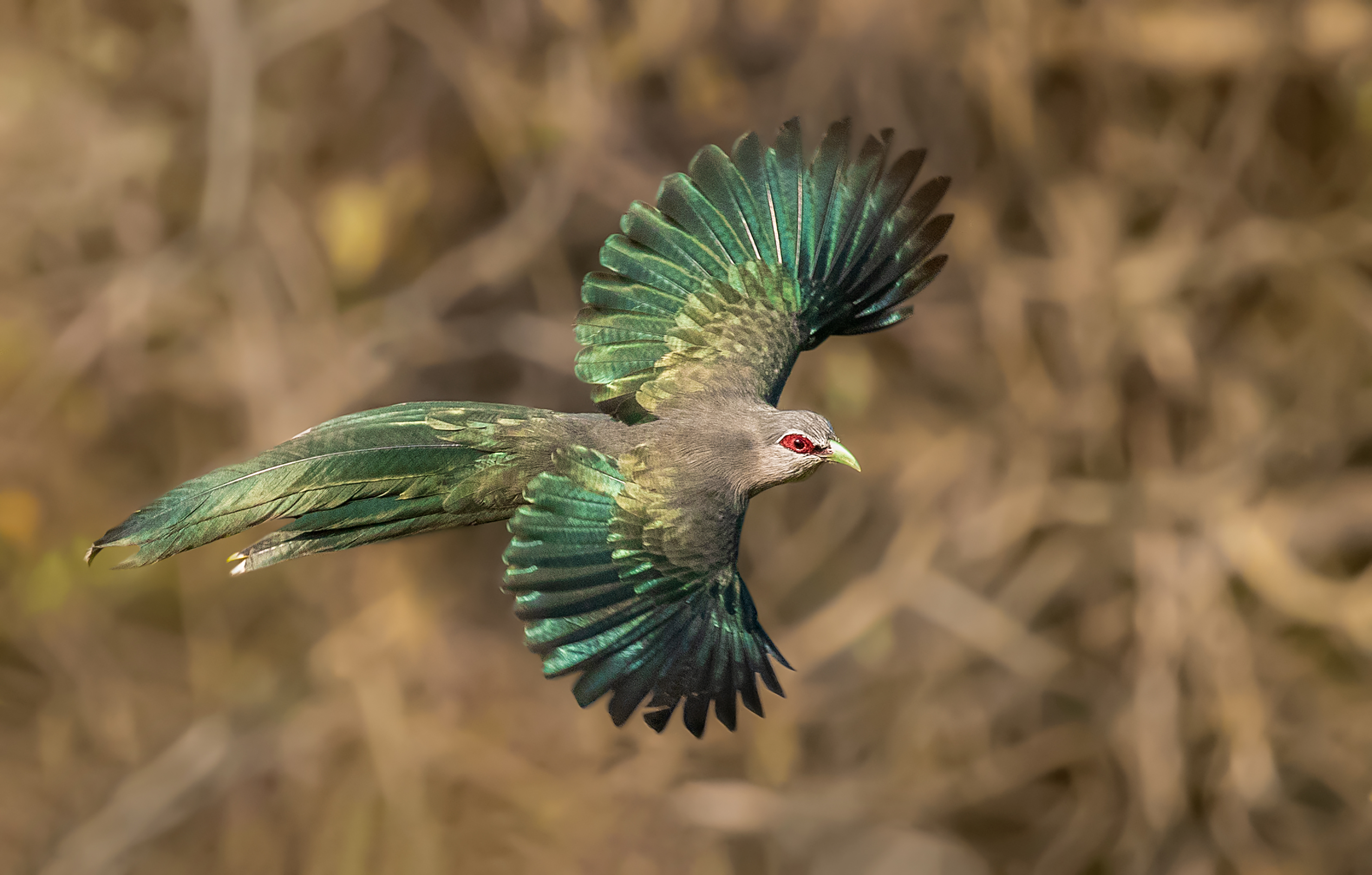
Green-billed malkoha

- Asian barred owlet
- Asian openbill
- Asian palm swift
- Barred buttonquail
- Black-winged stilt
- Blue-tailed bee-eater
- Blue-throated barbet
- Common kingfisher
- Crested treeswift
- Eurasian hoopoe
- Eurasian woodcock
- Garganey
- Great egret
- Greater painted snipe
- Green-billed malkoha
- Indochinese roller
- Mountain hawk-eagle
- Orange-breasted trogon
- Oriental bay owl
- Oriental pied hornbill
- Osprey
- Peregrine falcon
- Pheasant-tailed jacana
- Red-wattled lapwing
- Rufous woodpecker
- Savanna nightjar
- Silver pheasant
- Thick-billed green pigeon
- Vernal hanging parrot
- White-breasted waterhen

Twelve families of reptiles, represented by one reptile species:

- Banded supple skink
- Big-headed turtle
- Blue krait
- Burmese glass lizard
- Clouded monitor
- Golden tree snake
- Impressed tortoise
- Malayan pit viper
- Masked horned tree lizard
- Mountain slug snake
- Oldham's leaf turtle
- Tokay gecko

Four families of amphibians, represented by one amphibian species:

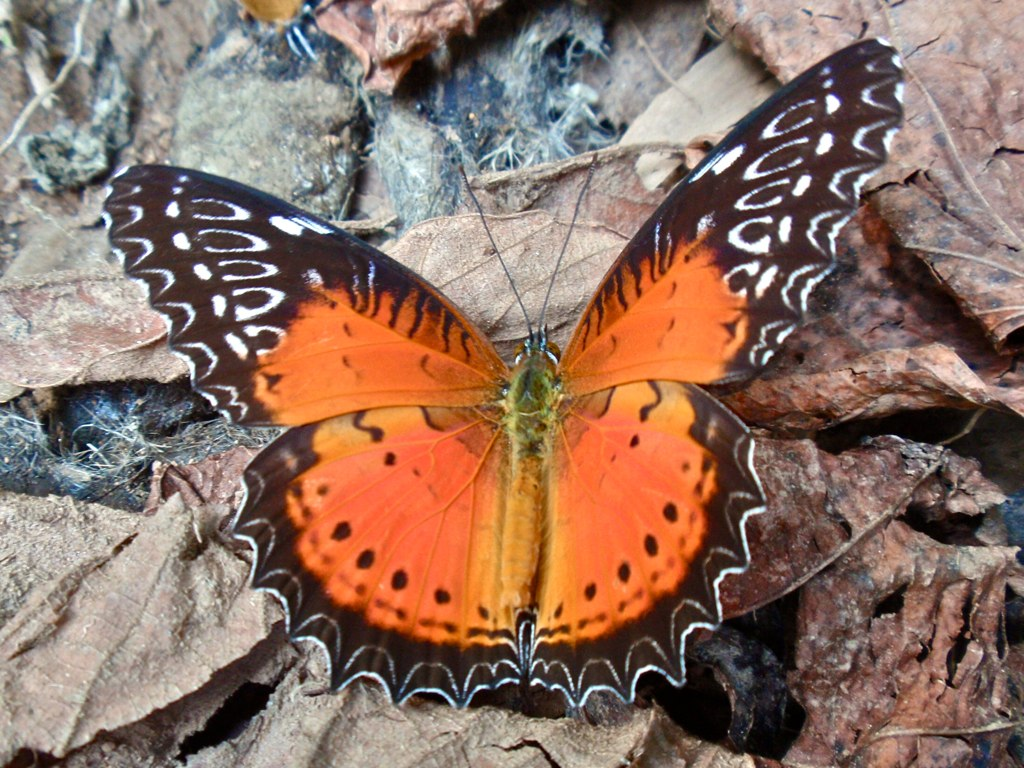
Red Lacewing

- Boulenger's bush-frog
- Chinese edible frog
- Painted chorus frog
- Smith's litter frog

At least there are 340 species of butterflies, which include:

- Australian lurcher
- Banded swallowtail
- Common birdwing
- Common bluebottle
- Great nawab
- Jungle glory
- Paris peacock
- Red Lacewing

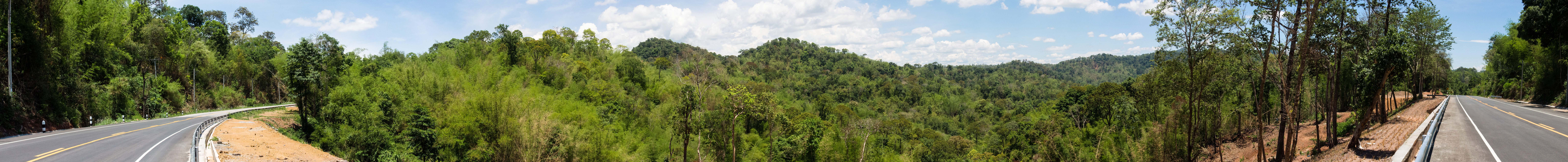
The park as seen from Route 12

== Places ==
- Namtok Haew Sai - a 20 metres (66 ft) high waterfall.
- Namtok Sai Thong - a 4 metres (13 ft) high waterfall.
- Namtok Tat Phranba - a 20 metres (66 ft) high waterfall.
- Pha Lom Pha Khong - a 1,134 metres (3,720 ft) high limestone mountain.
- Suanson Dong Paek - a pine forest.
- Suanson Phu Kum Kao - a pine forest at 880 m (2,890 ft) height.
- Tham Pha Hong - a 105 metres (344 ft) long cave.
- Tham Yai Nam Nao - a 9,817 metres (32,208 ft) long cave.

== Location ==
Nam Nao National Park in overview PARO 11 (Phitsanulok)

4) Nam Nao National Park in overview PARO 11 (Phitsanulok)

	National park			1	Khao Kho
2	Khwae Noi	3	Lam Nam Nan	4	Nam Nao
5	Namtok Chat Trakan	6	Phu Hin Rong Kla	7	Phu Soi Dao
8	Tat Mok	9	Thung Salaeng Luang	10	Ton Sak Yai
	Wildlife sanctuary				
11	Mae Charim	12	Nam Pat	13	Phu Khat
14	Phu Miang-Phu Thong	15	Phu Pha Daeng	16	Tabo-Huai Yai

== See also ==
- List of national parks in Thailand
- DNP - Nam Nao National Park
- List of Protected Areas Regional Offices of Thailand
