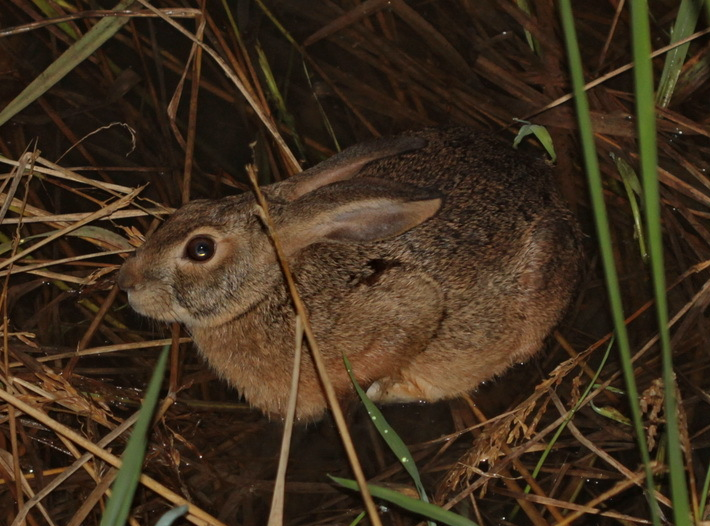
- Kaeng Krachan district, Phetchaburi, Thailand

Conservation status
- Least Concern (IUCN 3.1)

Scientific classification
- Kingdom: Animalia
- Phylum: Chordata
- Class: Mammalia
- Infraclass: Placentalia
- Order: Lagomorpha
- Family: Leporidae
- Genus: Lepus
- Species: L. peguensis

Binomial name
- Lepus peguensis Blyth, 1855
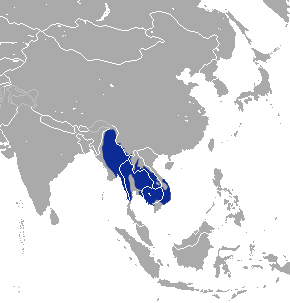
- Burmese hare range

Synonyms
- Lepus siamensis Bonhote, 1902; Lepus vassali O. Thomas, 1906

= Burmese hare =

Species of mammal

The Burmese hare (Lepus peguensis), also known as the Siamese hare, is a species of medium-sized hare found in Cambodia, Laos, Myanmar, Thailand, and Vietnam. It is typically found in forest clearings, croplands, wastelands, and sandy areas along coasts and rivers. Some populations have been found in the mountains of Thailand, though it is more often found at lower elevations below 800 metres (2,600 feet). The Burmese hare's closest relative is the Hainan hare, though it is more similar in appearance to the Indian hare.

The Burmese hare is identifiable by its reddish-grey body and white underbody fur. It is distinguished from the similar-looking Indian hare by its tail, which is black on top. It is most active during the night and at twilight, and is herbivorous, feeding upon grass, twigs, and bark, and is territorial. It reproduces several times a year, with each litter yielding one to seven young; the hares live up to six years on average. Though hunting and expanding rice farming threaten Burmese hare populations, the species is generally common throughout its wide distribution. Some populations are thought to be increasing in size due to logging operations creating favourable hare habitats. The International Union for Conservation of Nature considers it to be a least-concern species.

== Taxonomy and phylogeny ==
The English zoologist Edward Blyth described the Burmese hare, Lepus peguensis, in 1855. The specimen he described was a skin sent from the Bago Region (then known as Pegu) in Myanmar by Major Arthur Purves Phayre. Blyth thus gave it the species name peguensis after the region it was found in. The skin was suspected to belong to the Chinese hare (Lepus sinensis); Blyth noted its similarity to the Indian hare (L. nigricollis) but distinguished it based on its white underparts and black upper tail. The Hainan hare (L. hainanus) was considered synonymous with the Burmese hare from 1955 up until 2005. The genetic differences and similarities between the two species have yet to be clarified; differentiation has been reliant on analysis of the species' mitochondrial DNA.

Two subspecies are recognised:

- Lepus peguensis peguensis Blyth, 1855
- Lepus peguensis vassali Thomas, 1906, noted as being "pale in colour" and "smaller than L. peguensis" in its original description; thought to be a unique species in 1906 and named L. vassali after the discoverer of its type specimen, the French physician Joseph Vassal.

The subspecies Lepus peguensis siamensis has been called a synonym of the nominate subspecies L. p. peguensis, but since 2016 has been under consideration to be separated out as a unique species. The differences between Burmese hare subspecies have been described by the authors of the 2016 International Union for Conservation of Nature species assessment, Charlotte H. Johnston and Andrew T. Smith, as clinal and potentially "arbitrary and unreasonable".

The closest relatives to the Burmese hare are the Hainan hare and the Indian hare. These three species form a clade that is sister to a group made up of the European hare (Lepus europaeus), Abyssinian hare (L. habessinicus), and Granada hare (L. granatensis):

Cladogram showing genetic relationships between Lepus peguensis and other hares, according to Iraçabal and colleagues, 2024

- - - - Lepus peguensis
      - Lepus hainanus
    - Lepus nigricollis
  - - - Lepus europaeus
      - Lepus habessinicus
    - Lepus granatensis
- Other hares

=== Fossil record ===
Fossils of Burmese hares are rare, despite the species being widespread. 49 specimens are known from seven archaeological sites in Thailand, and the oldest among these fossils dates to roughly 8,000 years ago. Fossil remains of Burmese hares have been used as evidence of specific agricultural practices during their time period, as they are known to inhabit regions disturbed by humans. Larkin Chapman and colleagues argued in 2025 that the ratios of carbon, nitrogen and oxygen found in Burmese hare fossils are indicative of historical millet consumption in Southeast Asia.

== Description ==
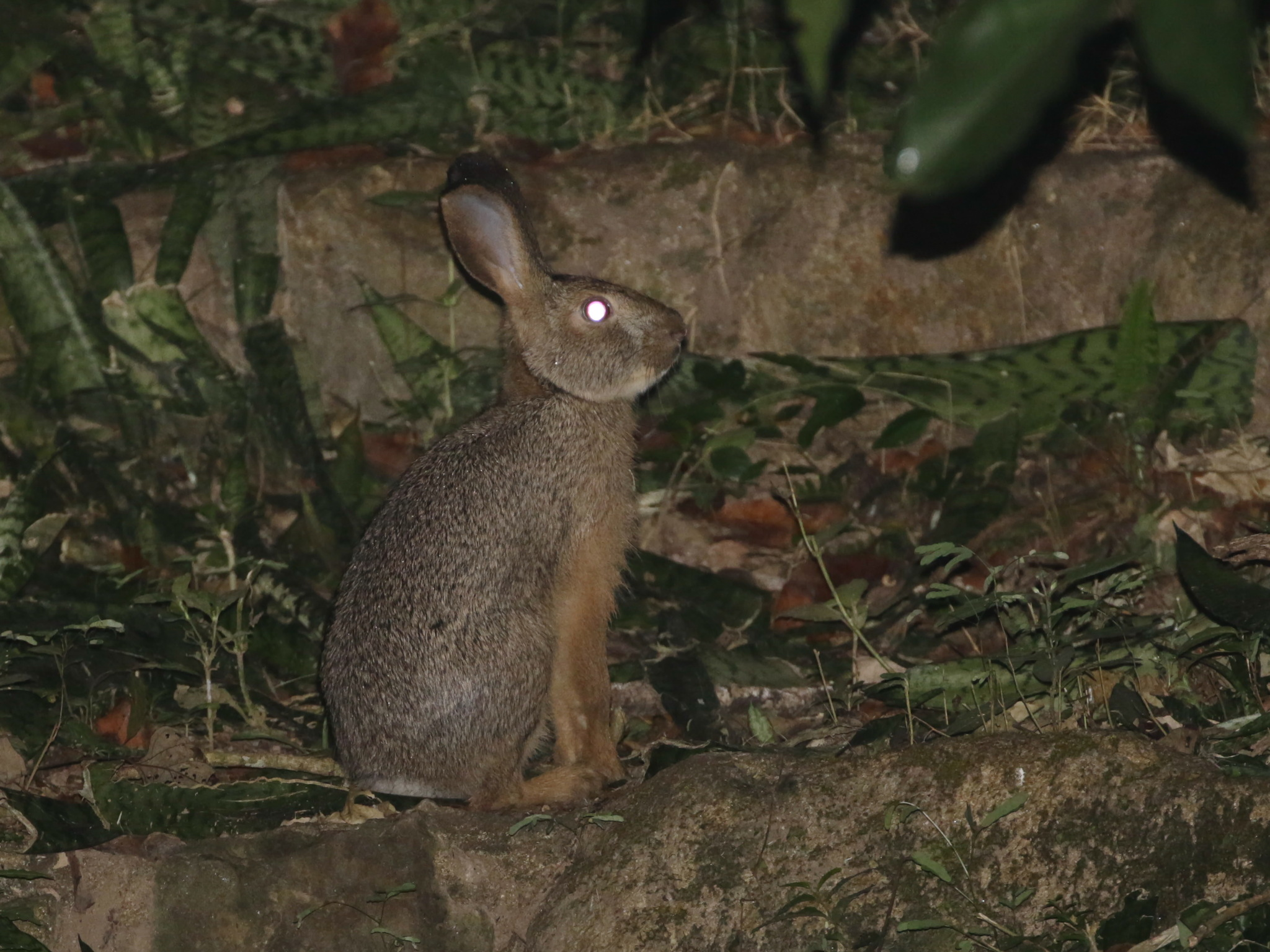
A Burmese hare in Chiang Mai province, Thailand

The Burmese hare is a medium-sized species that closely resembles the Indian hare. Adults grow to a length of 35 to 50 centimetres (14 to 20 in) and weigh between 2 and 2.5 kilograms (4.4 and 5.5 lb). The hare's body measures from 40 to 59 cm (16 to 23 in) in length, not including a 5.5 to 8.4 cm (2.2 to 3.3 in) tail. The hind feet measure from 9.6 to 11 cm (3.8 to 4.3 in), and the ears are fairly large, measuring from 8 to 9 cm (3.1 to 3.5 in) in length. The long ears have black tips, the dorsal surface of the body is reddish-grey tinged with black, the rump is more grey and the underparts are white. The tail is white above and black below. In Myanmar, the hare's feet are white, while they are more reddish- or yellowish-brown in specimens from Thailand.

Like other hares and rabbits, it has a dental formula of 2.0.3.31.0.2.3 × 2 = 28, indicating that it has two pairs of upper and one pair of lower incisors, no canines, three upper and two lower premolars on each side, and three upper and lower molars on either side of the jaw.

== Distribution and habitat ==
The range of the Burmese hare extends from southern Myanmar, south of the Chindwin River, to northern parts of the Malay Peninsula, including Thailand, Cambodia, southern Laos and southern Vietnam. The subspecies L. p. peguensis has been described as occupying the valleys of the Irrawaddy, Chindwin, and Salween rivers, from the 22nd parallel north down to Yangon. Its range also includes the cleared forests of Thailand and southern parts of the Malay Peninsula down to the 12th parallel north. L. p. vassali is found within Cambodia, Laos, and southern Vietnam.

The Burmese hare is mainly a lowland species, although it has been recorded as high as 1,300 metres (4,300 ft) in the mountains of Thailand; other surveys have not found it higher than 800 metres (2,600 ft). Its typical habitats are cropland and dry wasteland, clearings in forests and coastal sandy areas. The grass species Imperata cylindrica is a common plant found in Burmese hare habitat. It is common in seasonally-inundated riverside flats, and is present in rice fields cultivated in a traditional manner while avoiding heavily irrigated, intensively-grown paddies.

== Ecology and behaviour ==
The Burmese hare is a nocturnal and crepuscular species. It feeds on grass, twigs and bark. It is territorial.

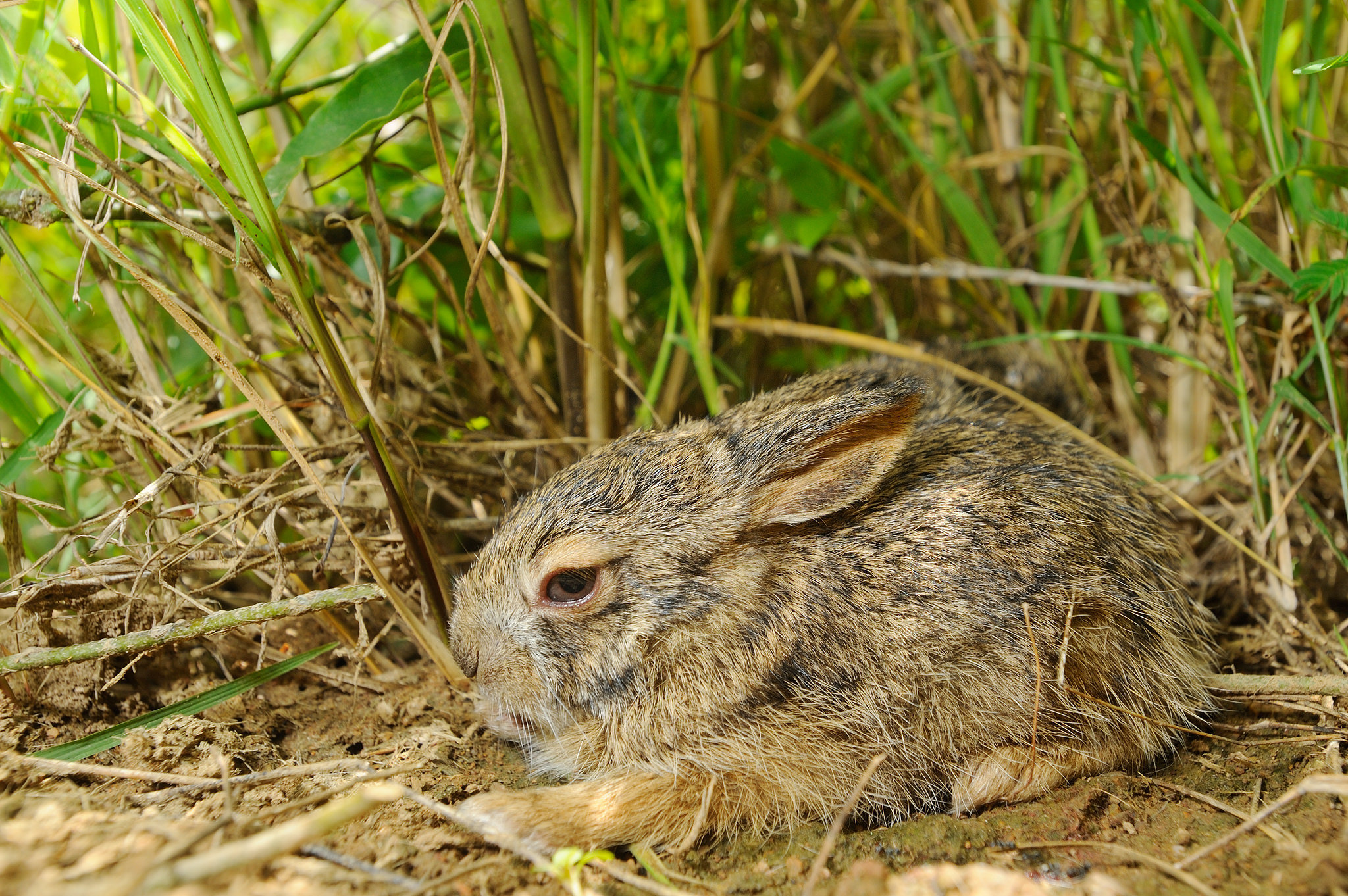
In Kui Buri National Park, Thailand

Several litters of one to seven young are born each year. The young are precocial, being born with open eyes and completely furred. The hare's gestation period lasts 35 to 40 days. During the breeding season, aggression between individuals increases dramatically; biting, forelimb boxing, and hind limb kicking is reported. Its average lifespan is estimated to be six years. One known predator of the Burmese hare is the jungle cat, which is known to inhabit dry deciduous forests.

== Conservation status ==
Threats faced by the Burmese hare include the increased cultivation of irrigated rice paddies, which results in unsuitable habitat, and being hunted extensively for food. In Laos and Vietnam, the hare's habitat is often burned during the dry season from February to May. Populations of the hare are isolated from each other by forest. However, the hare has a wide distribution and is common within its range. Burning of its habitat may only pose a threat to younger members of the species. Its population is stable, or even possibly increasing in places where logging results in favourable scrubby habitat. The species' range is presumed to be increasing in areas of Laos that are subject to human-driven deforestation. The International Union for Conservation of Nature lists it as a least concern species, but further research on its distribution, taxonomy, and behaviour has been recommended by the authors of the most recent Red List assessment.
