= Topography of Phitsanulok province =

Phitsanulok Province จังหวัดพิษณุโลก
- Province
- Interactive map of Phitsanulok Province
- Coordinates: 16.8°N 100.27°E
- Country: Thailand
- Region: Northern Thailand
- Seat: Phitsanulok City

Government
  - Governor: Phinit Naree

Area
  - Total: 10,532 km^{2} (4,066 sq mi)

Population (2020)
  - Total: 855,000
  - Density: 81.2/km^{2} (210/sq mi)
- Time zone: UTC+7 (Thailand Standard Time)
- Postal code: 65000
- Area code: 056
- Website: Official website

Topographical features within the Phitsanulok Province of Thailand include the Phetchabun Mountains, the Nan River and several of its tributaries, waterfalls, swamps, forests, grasslands, caves, a reservoir and an extensive network of canals. Populated areas of the province are largely cleared of natural vegetation and adapted for farming. The land in the province is in the Greater Nan Basin, which is part of the Chao Phraya Watershed. The province includes land within both of the greater Nan basin's sub-basins, i.e., the Nan Basin and Yom Basin. The provincial capital of Phitsanulok is sometimes called Song Kwae, the "city of two rivers", an ancient name dating to a time centuries ago when the Nan and Khwae Noi Rivers met near the city. These two rivers of the Phitsanulok Province are still of major significance to the residents of the region.

== Mountains ==
The Phetchabun Mountains run through the province, and provide the source of several of the rivers and streams flowing through the region.

== Caves ==
There are a substantial number of caves located within the province.

== Forest ==
Most of Phitsanulok's forested areas are in the east of the province within Phitsanulok's national parks. The total forest area is 3,949 km^{2} (1,525 sq mi) or 37.3 percent of provincial area.

== Grasslands ==
There are several natural meadows or thung preserved in the province's Thung Salaeng Luang National Park.

== Agricultural land ==
The majority of inhabited lands in Phitsanulok (i.e., outside the national parks) have been largely cleared of their natural vegetation and adapted for agricultural use, primarily rice farming. As a result, several of the indigenous species of plant life in the region have become endangered.

== Major rivers ==
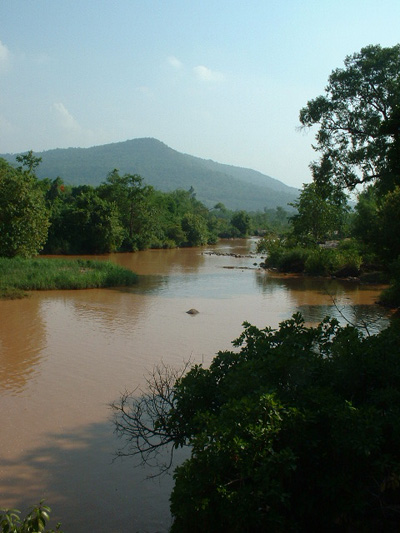
Wang Thong River in Wang Thong

The principal rivers that flow through the province belong to the Nan River System. The following tree indicates the positions of the province's rivers in the Nan tributary tree:

- Nan River
  - Yom River
  - Wat Ta Yom River
    - Tha Muen Ram River
      - Chomphu River
  - Wang Thong River
  - Khwae Noi River

== Streams ==
Minor rivers and streams that flow through Phitsanulok Province include the Fia, Kaem, Kap, Pak, Kleung, Bang Kaeo, Grung Grak, Ban Mung, and Tarai Yoi.

== Waterfalls ==
At least nine waterfalls or namtok lie within the borders of the province:

- Kaeng Song Waterfall
- Kaeng Sopha Waterfall
- Na Hin Waterfall
- Najan Waterfall
- Pakrong Waterfall (a.k.a. Chat Trakan Waterfall)
- Pha Ku Ka Waterfall
- Poi Waterfall
- Sri Dit Waterfall
- Wang Nok Aen Waterfall

== Rapids ==
Most rapids in the province are on the Wang Thong River. Kaeng Wang Nam Yen Rapids lie within Thung Salaeng Luang National Park.

== Canals ==
The farming industry of Phitsanulok is supported by an extensive network of irrigation canals called khlong, which connect the farms to the Nan River and its tributaries.

== Lakes ==
- Huay Nam Kem Reservoir

== Swamps ==
There are a number of swamps or bueng in Phitsanulok province. The most significant of these swamps are:

- Bueng Thakreng (Thai: บึงตะเคร็ง)
- Bueng Laman (Thai: บึงละมาน)
- Bueng Kee Raeng (Thai: บึงขี้แร้ง)
- Bueng Rachanok
