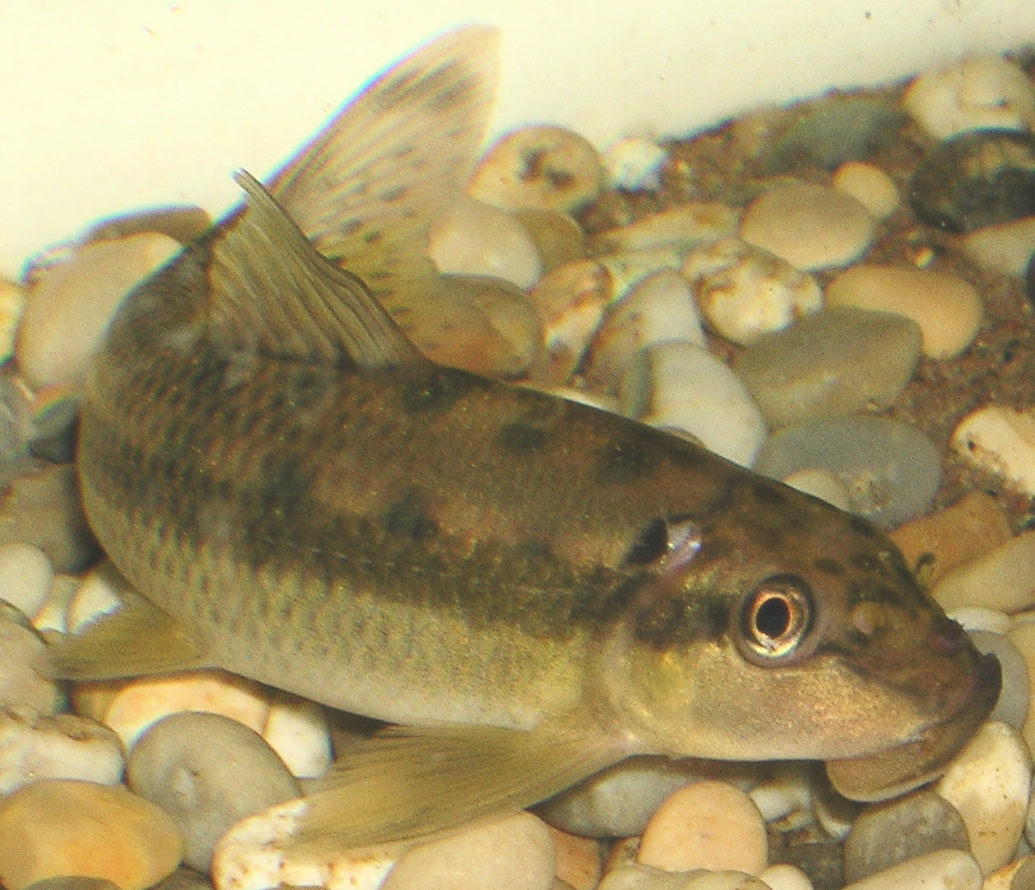
- Gyrinocheilus aymonieri

Conservation status
- Least Concern (IUCN 3.1)

Scientific classification
- Kingdom: Animalia
- Phylum: Chordata
- Class: Actinopterygii
- Order: Cypriniformes
- Family: Gyrinocheilidae
- Genus: Gyrinocheilus
- Species: G. aymonieri

Binomial name
- Gyrinocheilus aymonieri (Tirant, 1883)

Synonyms
- Psilorhynchus aymonieri Tirant, 1883; Gyrinocheilus kaznakovi Berg, 1906; Gyrinocheilus monchadskii Krasyukova & Gusev, 1987

= Gyrinocheilus aymonieri =

Species of fish

Gyrinocheilus aymonieri is a freshwater fish native to large parts of Southeast Asia. It is of interest as a local food source and for the aquarium trade. Its common names include honey sucker, sucking loach and Chinese algae eater.

G. aymonieri is found in the Chao Phraya basin, northern Malay Peninsula, Mekong basin (in Cambodia, Yunnan province in China, Laos, Thailand, and Vietnam), Mae Klong basin and the Xe Bang Fai River. It is most often seen in large rivers, occasionally entering flooded fields. The fish spends most of its time on flat surfaces, such as rocks, in flowing water, using its unusually formed inferior mouth to attach itself to rocks in stronger flows.

The fish are sold in local markets as a food source and small fish are used in preparation of prahok.

== Physical description ==
G. aymonieri has been recorded as reaching at least 28 cm (11 in) SL and is the only species in the genus to have 9 branched dorsal rays and 36–40 lateral line scales. The mouth is inferior with a special "sucker" modification which allows the fish to attach itself to smooth surfaces. No barbels are present.

Wild type colour varies from pale grey to olive, with darker markings along the lateral line which vary from a solid stripe with alternating higher and lower extensions to uneven dots. The belly is usually paler than the base colour. Some darker markings may also be observed along the back and on the caudal fin, but no dark markings occur on the pelvic and anal fins.

== Name ==
The scientific name commemorates the French linguist and explorer Étienne Aymonier (1844–1929).

== In aquaria ==
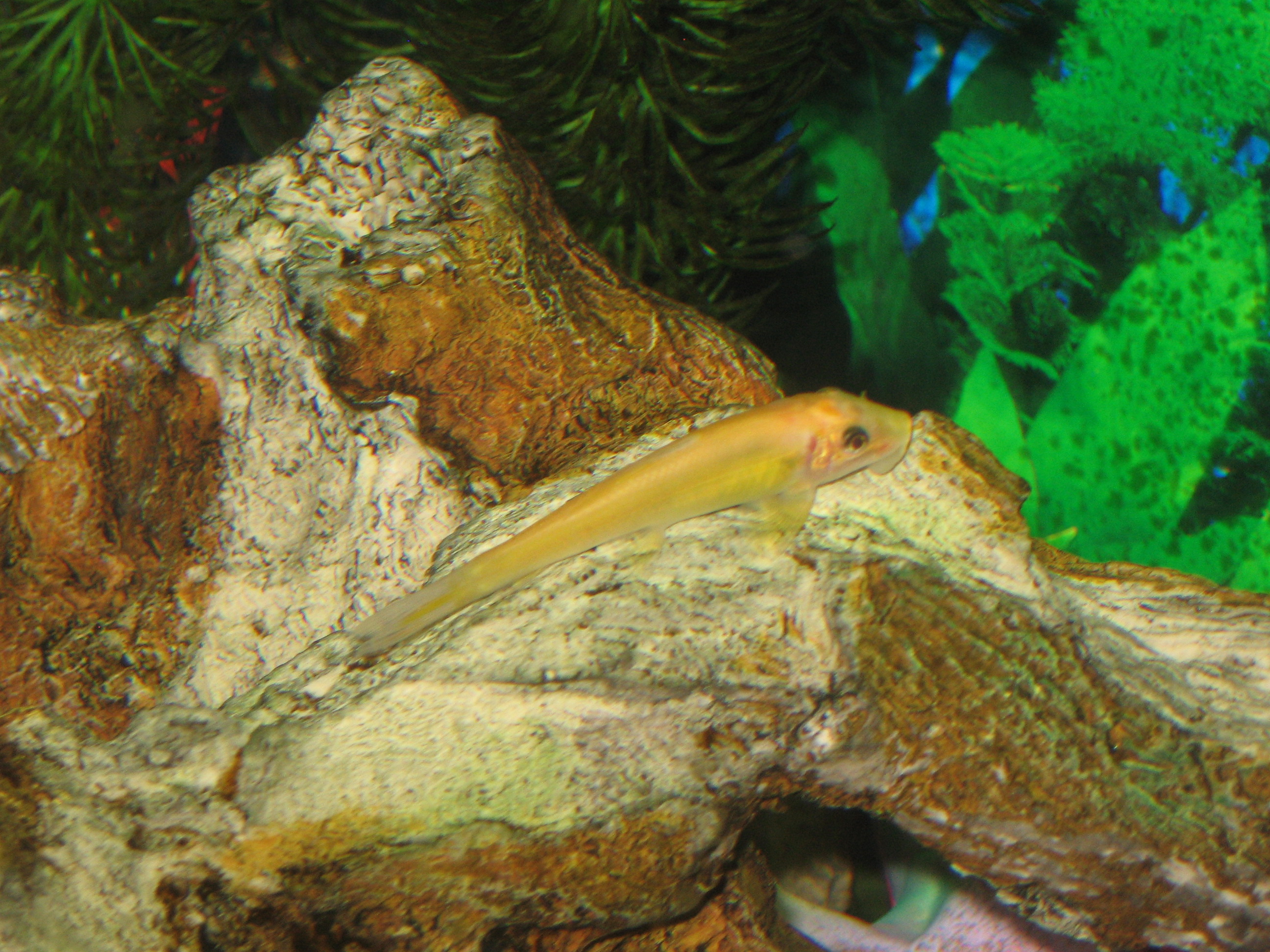
Golden G. aymoneiri

G. aymonieri is similar in colouration to a number of other species which are commonly available in the aquarium trade, such as Crossocheilus oblongus, Epalzeorhynchos kalopterus, and Garra cambodgiensis, and is sometimes misidentified as one of these species. It is available in a number of colour morphs, including wild type, gold, marble, albino, and leucistic forms.

The species does not breed readily in home aquaria, although fry are occasionally reported as being found in overgrown aquaria. At this time, no definitive spawning triggers are known. Sexing is difficult, although mature males may develop breeding tubercles on their noses, while females become plumper.

G. aymonieri fish are often bought as algae eaters because they will readily eat algae.

The other species in the genus, Gyrinocheilus pennocki and Gyrinocheilus pustulosus, are rarely seen in the aquarium trade.
