= Algae eater =

Algae-eating species of animals, such as fish

Algae eater or algivore is a common name for any bottom-dwelling or filter-feeding aquatic animal species that specialize in feeding on algae and phytoplanktons. Algae eaters are important for the fishkeeping hobby and many are commonly kept by aquarium hobbyists to improve water quality. They are also important primary consumers that relay the biomass and energy from photosynthetic autotrophes up into the food web, as well as protecting the aquatic ecosystem against algae blooms.

== Freshwater ==
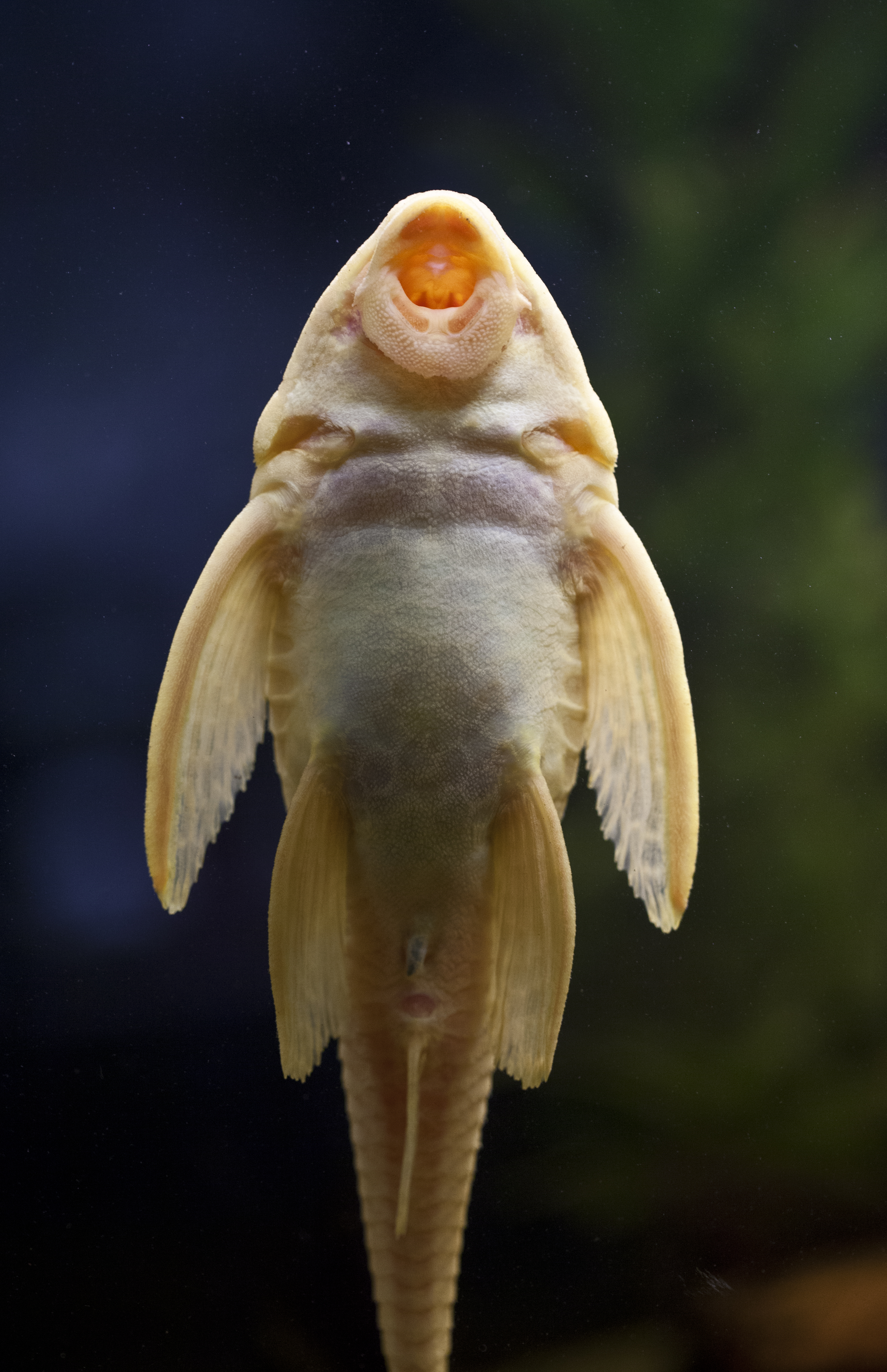
A Plecostomus uses its mouth, shaped like a suction-cup, to attach itself to surfaces and scrape off algae.

=== Fish ===
Some of the common and most popular freshwater aquarium algae eaters include:

- Many loricariid catfish of South America, such as genera Otocinclus, Ancistrus, and Plecostomus, constantly graze algae and biofilm, although many species of "plecos", which attain an adult length of over 10 inches, eat much less frequently as they near adulthood.
- The Siamese algae eater (Crossocheilus oblongus) is a more gregarious and tolerant cyprinid that ranges up to 15 cm (5.9 in). It is one of the only fish that will graze on "black brush algae" (freshwater Rhodophyta, or red algae), but even so will eat anything else in preference.
- Fishes of the genus Gyrinocheilus, family Gyrinocheilidae. There are three species in this genus with the Chinese algae eater, Gyrinocheilus aymonieri, the most common. Small specimens make good community fish but may become territorial when older.
- American-flag fish, Jordanella floridae, are also dependable algae-eating fish. They are one of the only fish to graze on black brush algae, as with the siamese algae eater, and will also indiscriminately graze on other algae such as diatoms and hair algae. However, like all pupfish, they can be nippy to fish smaller or slower than them. Males can also be territorial.

Common freshwater algivorous fish:

- Loricariid
  - Otocinclus, most often the common otocinclus.
  - Ancistrus
  - Plecostomus
- Cyprinid
  - Siamese algae eater (Crossocheilus oblongus)
  - Chinese algae eater (Gyrinocheilus aymonieri)
  - Japanese white crucian carp (Carassius cuvieri)
  - Silver carp (Hypophthalmichthys molitrix)
  - Bighead carp (Hypophthalmichthys nobilis)
  - Grass carp (Ctenopharyngodon idellus)
  - Pungtungia herzi
- Osmeridae
  - ayu sweetfish (Plecoglossus altivelis)

=== Shrimp ===
Some freshwater shrimp are also excellent algae eaters:

- Almost all of them belong to the family Atyidae (the only family in the superfamily Atyoidea) including many genera

- Caridina: red rhinoceros shrimp, bee shrimp, etc... One shrimp well known for its ability to clean an aquarium is the Amano shrimp.
- Neocaridina: Neocaridina davidi (cherry shrimp), Neocaridina palmata, etc.

- Some of them belong to the genus Palaemonetes (grass shrimp)

=== Snails ===
Most species of freshwater snails, discounting most adult specimens of species belonging to the family Ampullariidae, which primarily subsist on aquatic plants as adults.

- Bellamyinae
- Lioplacinae
- Viviparinae

== Saltwater ==
Some of the known types of fish to eat algae are blennies and tangs, but along with fish there are snails, crabs, and sea urchins who also eat algae. These species are known to eat red slime algae, green film algae, hair algae, diatoms, cyanobacteria, brown film algae, detritus, and microalgae.

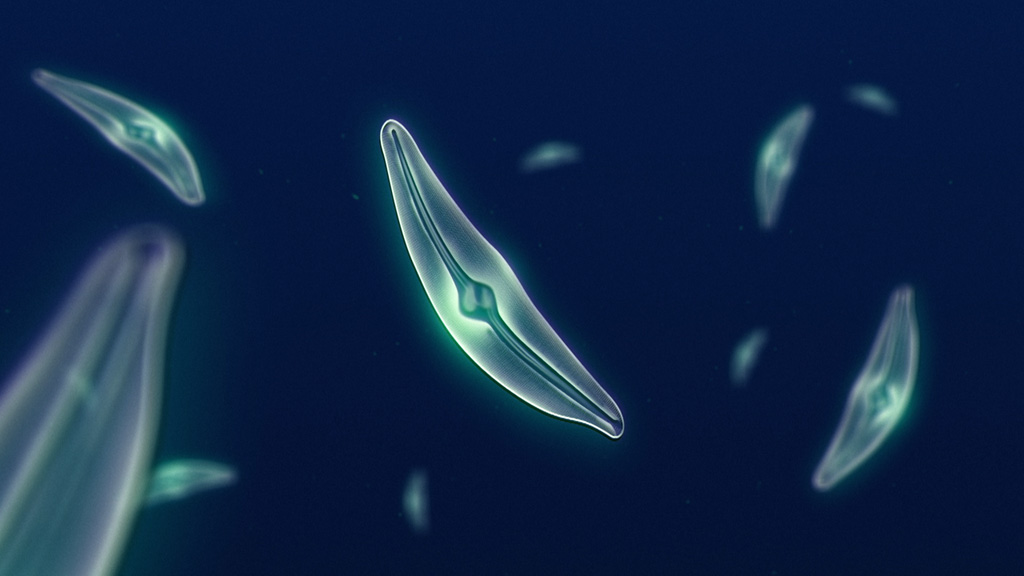
Diatoms

=== Fish ===
There are several saltwater fish species that eat algae. Two of the major algae eaters are blennies and tangs. These fish eat red slime algae, green film algae, and hair algae. Some of the known species are as follows:

Blennies:

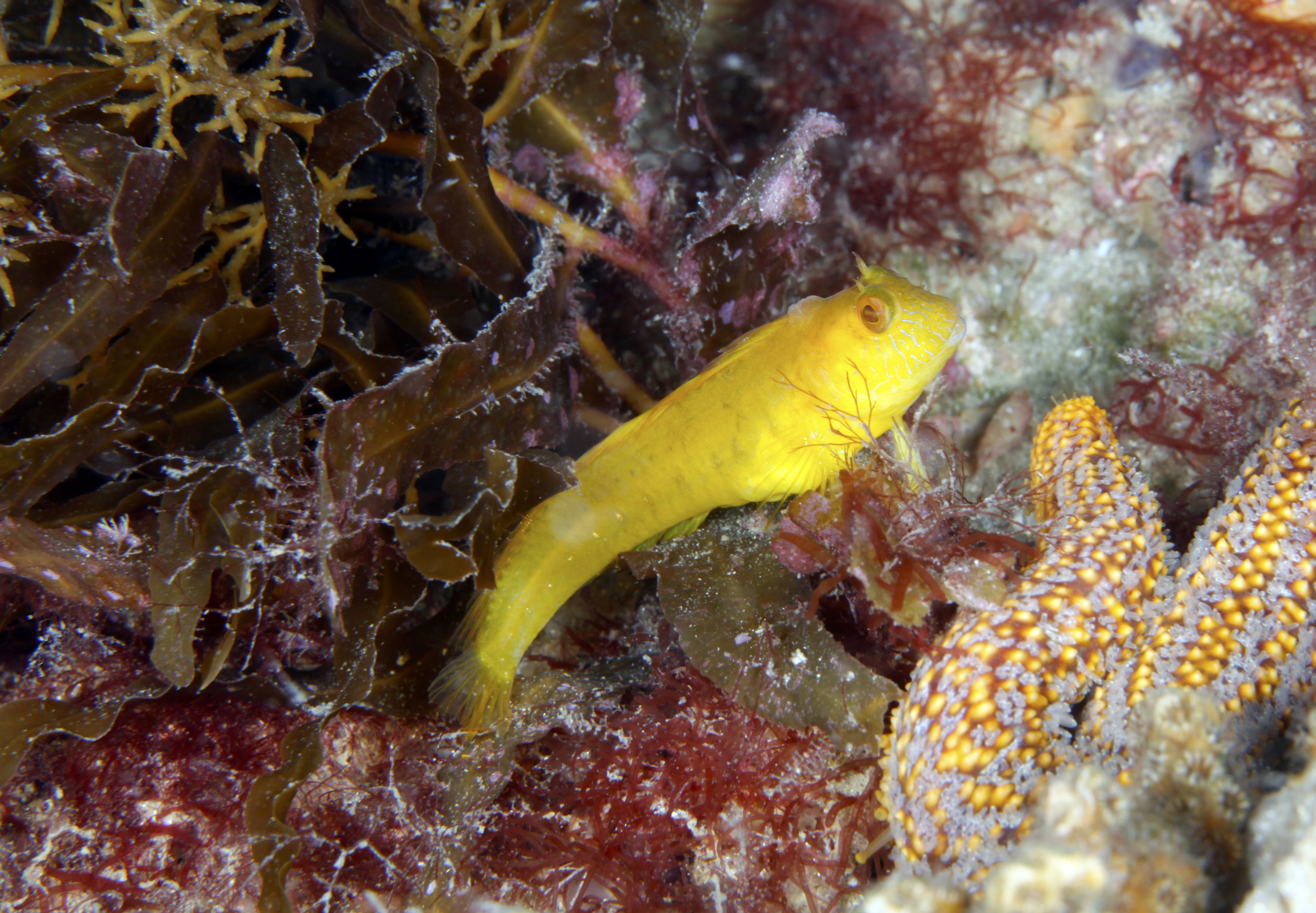
Seaweed Blenny

- Leopard Blenny
- High Fin Blenny
- Linear Blenny
- One Spot Blenny
- Sailfin Blenny
- Segmented Sail Fin Blenny
- Starry Blenny
- Tail Spot Blenny
- Two Spot Benny
- Seaweed Blenny

Tangs:

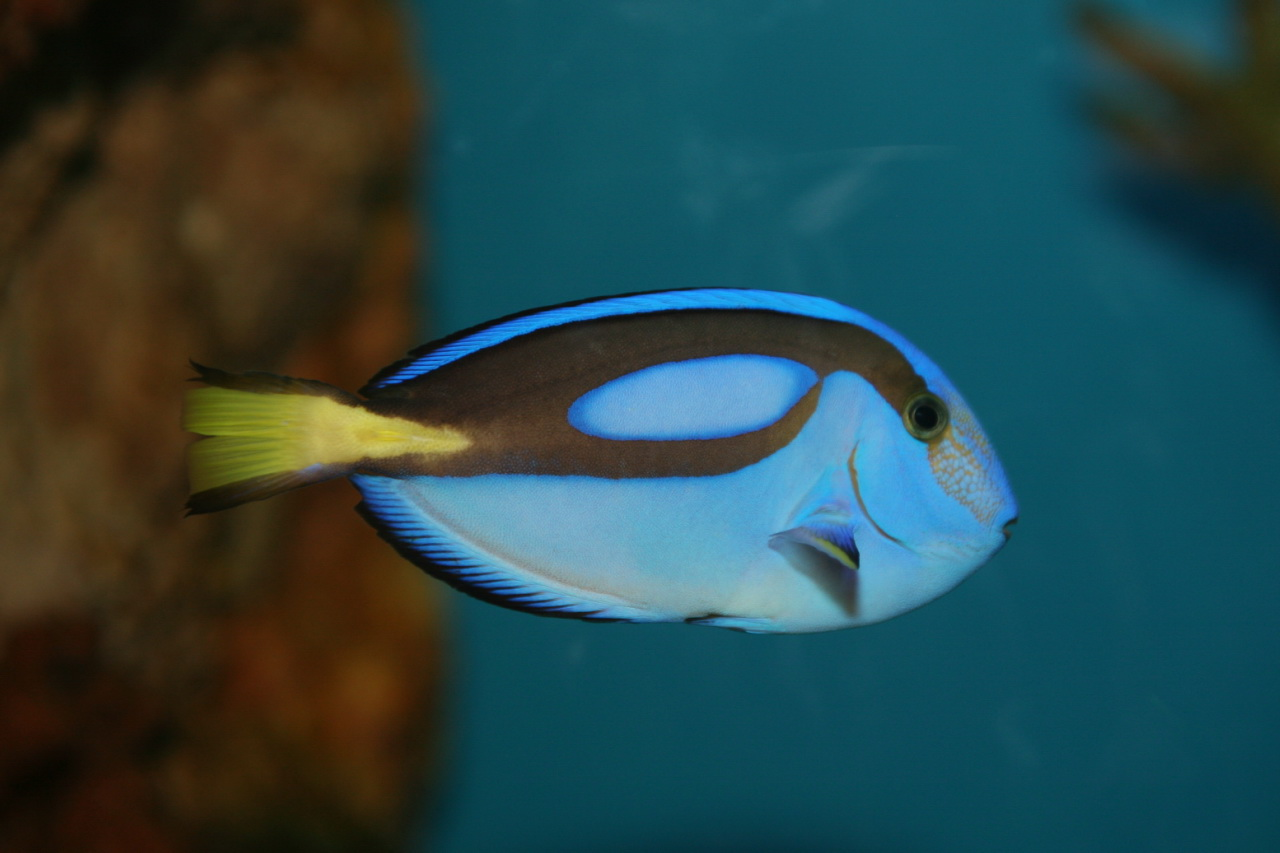
Regal Blue Tang

- Regal Blue Tang
- Blonde Naso Tang
- Red Sea Sailfin Tang
- Purple Tang
- Cheveron Tang
- Convict Tang
- Kole Tang
- Goldrim Tang
- Orangebar Tang
- Powder Blue Tang
- Yellow Tang
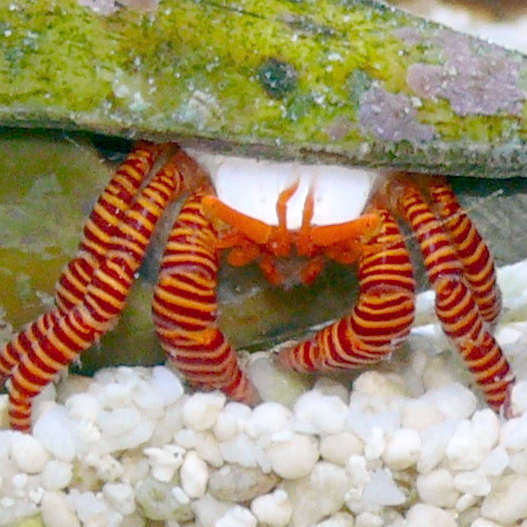
  Halloween Hermit Crab
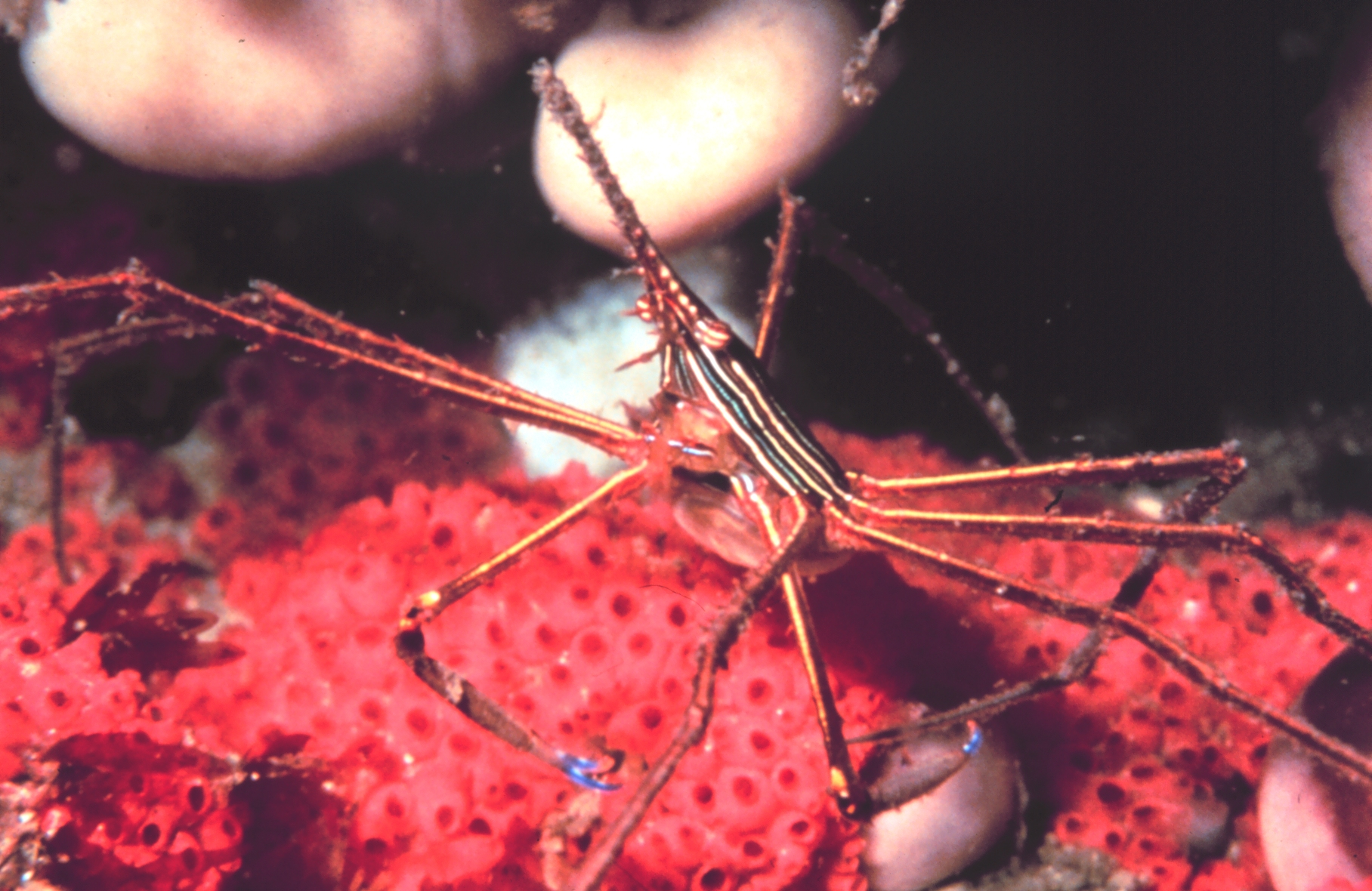
  Arrow Crab

=== Crabs ===
Hermit crabs and other species of crabs eat algae. Crabs eat green algae, film algae, red slime algae, diatoms, cyanobacteria, and microalgae. Some of the known species are:

Hermit Crabs:

- Dwarf Blue Leg Hermit Crab
- Dwarf Red Tip Hermit Crab
- Electric Blue Hermit Crab
- Halloween Hermit Crab
- Hawaiian Zebra Hermit Crab
- Anemone Carrying Hermit Crab

Other Species:

- Arrow Crab
- Spotted Porcelain Crab
- Decorator Spider Crabs

=== Sea urchins ===
All species of sea urchin eat algae. They eat all sizes of algae, from something as small as macroalgae to something as large as kelp, and have been known to eat Coralline algae. In cooler waters, sea urchins have even been known to eat enough to control the size and compositions of kelp forests. Sea urchins act as scavengers and will also eat dead algae that they find. Some sea urchins, such as the variegated sea urchin or the red sea urchin, have become popular as pets for home aquariums because of their ability to proficiently eat algae.

=== Snails ===
Snails are known for eating hair algae, cyanobacteria, diatoms, green film algae, brown film algae, and detritus.

- Chestnut Cowrie Snail
- Zebra Turbo Snail
- Trochus Snails
- Mexican Turbo Snail
- Conch Snail
- Cerith Snail
- Orange Spot Butterscotch Nassarius Snail
- Lager Super Longan Nassarius
- Tropical balone
- Bumblebee Snails
