= Neolissochilus subterraneus =

Conservation status
- Vulnerable (IUCN 3.1)

Scientific classification
- Kingdom: Animalia
- Phylum: Chordata
- Class: Actinopterygii
- Order: Cypriniformes
- Family: Cyprinidae
- Genus: Neolissochilus
- Species: N. subterraneus

Binomial name
- Neolissochilus subterraneus Vidthayanon & Kottelat, 2003

Species of fish

Neolissochilus subterraneus, commonly known as the cave brook carp, is a species of cyprinid cavefish that is endemic to the Tham Phra Wang Daeng cave within Thung Salaeng Luang National Park, Phitsanulok Province in Thailand. The genus name derives from the Greek words "neos", "lissos", and "cheilos"; they mean new, smooth, and lip respectively.

== Habitat ==
Neolissochilus subterraneus lives primarily if not exclusively in the Tham Phra Wang Daeng cave at a depth of 0–2 metres (0–7 ft). Fish at different life stages inhabit different areas of the cave.

== Diet ==
Neolissochilus subterraneus has a largely detritus-based diet, along with bat guano.
