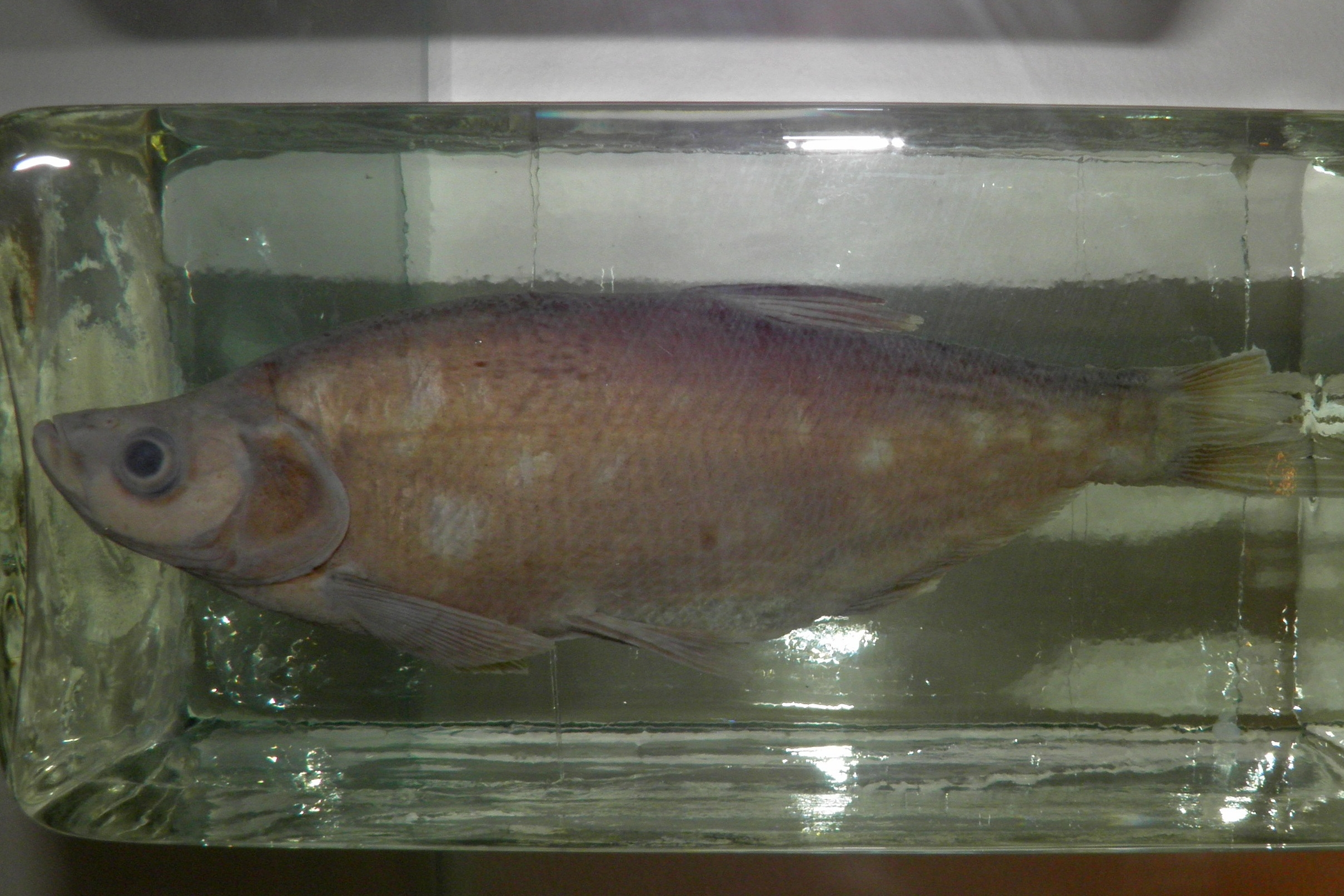
- Culter alburnus

Scientific classification
- Kingdom: Animalia
- Phylum: Chordata
- Class: Actinopterygii
- Order: Cypriniformes
- Family: Xenocyprididae
- Genus: Culter; Basilewsky, 1855

Type species
- Culter alburnus Basilewsky, 1855

= Culter (fish) =

Genus of fishes

Culter is a genus of freshwater ray-finned fishes belonging to the family Xenocyprididae, the East Asian minnows or sharpbellies. The fishes in this genus are found in eastern Asia from Siberia to Viet Nam. The name is derived from the Latin word culter, meaning "knife". Culter is closely related to Chanodichthys and some species have been moved between these genera.

== Species ==
Culter has the following species classified within it:

- Culter alburnus Basilewsky, 1855
- Culter compressocorpus P. L. Yih & C. R. Chu, 1959
- Culter flavipinnis Tirant, 1883
