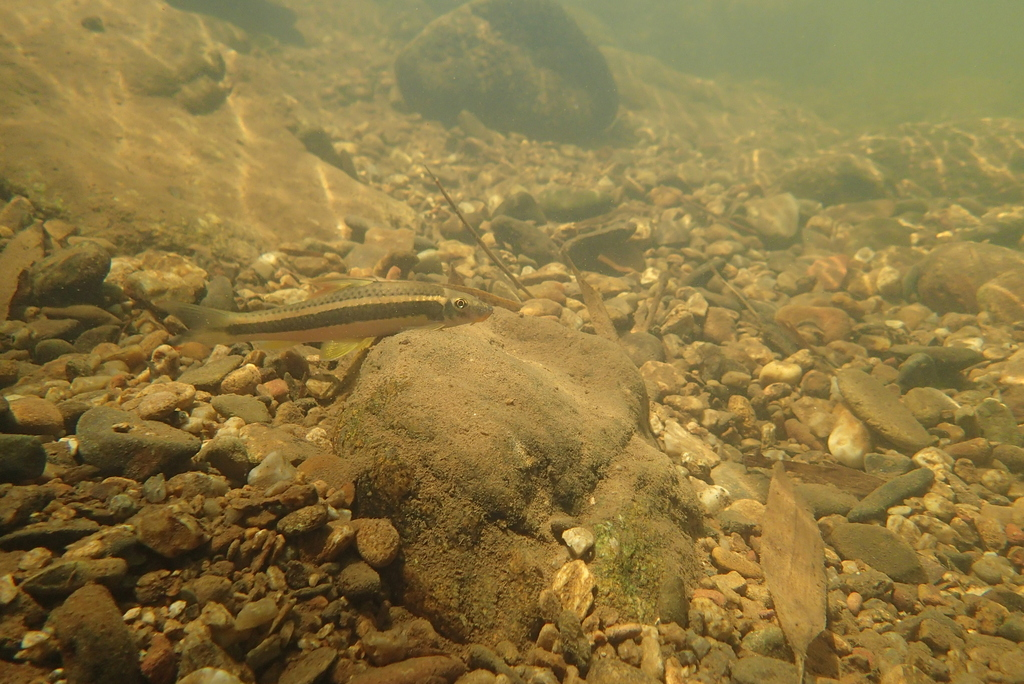
- Ceratogarra cambodgiensis

Scientific classification
- Kingdom: Animalia
- Phylum: Chordata
- Class: Actinopterygii
- Order: Cypriniformes
- Family: Cyprinidae
- Subfamily: Labeoninae
- Genus: Ceratogarra; Kottelat, 1920

Type species
- Cirrhina cambodgiensis Tirant, 1884

= Ceratogarra =

Genus of fishes

Ceratogarra is a genus of freshwater ray-finned fish belonging to the family Cyprinidae, the family which includes the carps, barbs and related fishes. These fishes are found in southeast Asia.

== Species ==
Ceratogarra contains the following valid species:

- Ceratogarra cambodgiensis (Tirant, 1884) (Cambodian logsucker)
- Ceratogarra fasciacauda (Fowler, 1937)
