= Humpback =

Humpback may refer to:

- Humpback whale
- Humpback dolphin
- Humpback salmon
- Humpback bridge
- Humpback, a common name for the fish Chanodichthys dabryi
- Humpback, a variant of hunchback, a syndrome experienced by humans
- Hump Back (Japanese band), a three-member all-female Japanese rock band
