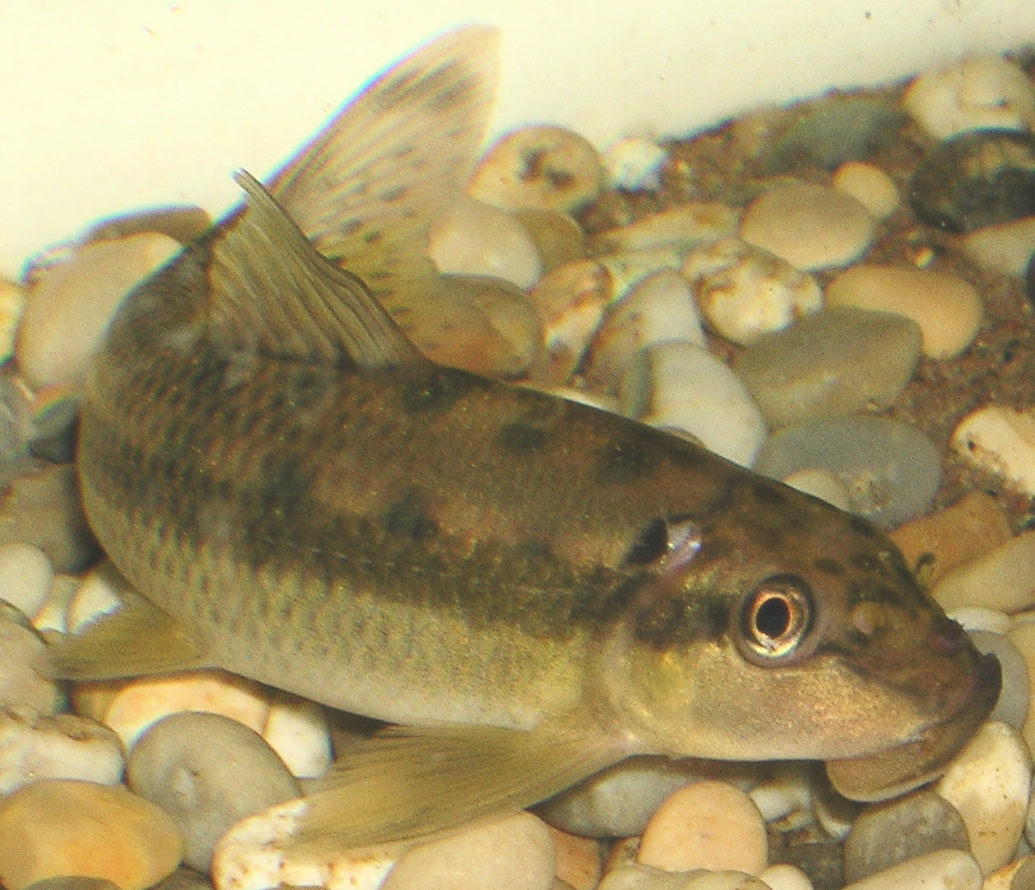
- Gyrinocheilus aymonieri

Scientific classification
- Kingdom: Animalia
- Phylum: Chordata
- Class: Actinopterygii
- Order: Cypriniformes
- Suborder: Gyrinocheiloidei; Betancur-R, et al., 2017
- Family: Gyrinocheilidae; T. N. Gill, 1905
- Genus: Gyrinocheilus; Vaillant, 1902

Type species
- Gyrinocheilus pustulosus Vaillant, 1902

Species
- See text

Synonyms
- Gyrinocheilops Fowler, 1937

= Gyrinocheilus =

Genus of fishes

Gyrinocheilus is the single genus in the family Gyrinocheilidae, a family of small Southeast Asian cypriniform fishes that live in fast-flowing freshwater mountain streams. The species in this genus are commonly called algae eaters. They hold on to fixed objects using a sucker-like mouth, and, despite the name, feed on a wide range of detritus, rather than simply on algae. A "golden" variety of G. aymonieri, the Chinese algae eater or "sucking loach", can be found in many pet shops and fish farms.

== Sucker ==
The mouths of these fish have developed into a suckermouth, which allows the fish to cling onto objects in the fast-moving water of their habitat. They therefore stay close to the bottom, where their primary food, algae, is more readily available. Uniquely among fish, members of this family have gill slits with two openings each. Water enters through one opening, and leaves through the other. This allows the fish to breathe without having to take water in through the mouth, which is in use to cling to surfaces.

The Chinese algae eater is sometimes kept in aquaria to control algae. It can range up to 11 inches (280 mm) in length and has a reputation for becoming increasingly territorial as it matures, and can also be aggressive to other fish, especially slow, flat-bodied species. In the home aquarium, the Chinese algae eater generally makes a poor tank mate. It can be very boisterous, and when improperly fed, has been known to attack other fish and rip off scales, causing infection. It rarely takes food from the surface of the water as it is a demersal species, and as such an appropriate sinking food should be provided. It is very hardy and can endure water conditions that would be toxic to many other aquarium fish, but it should never be kept in such conditions intentionally. Thriving over a wide temperature range, 64–86 °F (18–30 °C), it is frequently kept in unheated indoor aquariums in some climates.

== Species ==
- Gyrinocheilus aymonieri (Tirant, 1883)
- Gyrinocheilus pennocki (Fowler, 1937) (spotted algae eater)
- Gyrinocheilus pustulosus Vaillant, 1902 (Borneo algae eater)

== Similar fish ==
As "algae eater" is a common name for several fish, gyrinocheilids can be easily confused with other species. Most notably is the Siamese algae eater, Crossocheilus siamensis, which belongs to the family Cyprinidae.
