= Chanodichthys abramoides =

Conservation status
- Least Concern (IUCN 3.1)

Scientific classification
- Kingdom: Animalia
- Phylum: Chordata
- Class: Actinopterygii
- Order: Cypriniformes
- Suborder: Cyprinoidei
- Family: Xenocyprididae
- Genus: Chanodichthys
- Species: C. abramoides

Binomial name
- Chanodichthys abramoides (Dybowski, 1872)

Synonyms
- Culter abramoides Dybowski, 1872; Erythroculter dabryi shinkainensis Yih & Chu, 1959

Species of fish

Chanodichthys abramoides is a species of ray-finned fish belonging to the family Xenocyprididae, the East Asian minnows or sharpbellies. This fish is endemic to the southern part of the lower Amur river system, including the Sungari and Ussuri rivers and Lake Khanka, in Heilongjiang and Jilin provinces in China and in Amur, Primorsky Krai and Khabarovsk Krai districts in Russia.
