= Ceratogarra fasciacauda =

Conservation status
- Least Concern (IUCN 3.1)

Scientific classification
- Kingdom: Animalia
- Phylum: Chordata
- Class: Actinopterygii
- Order: Cypriniformes
- Family: Cyprinidae
- Subfamily: Labeoninae
- Genus: Ceratogarra
- Species: C. fasciacauda

Binomial name
- Ceratogarra fasciacauda (Fowler, 1937)

Synonyms
- Garra bisangularis Chen, Wu & Xiao, 2010; Garra fasciacauda Fowler, 1937

Species of fish

Ceratogarra fasciacauda is a species of ray-finned fish in the genus Ceratogarra from the Chao Praya, Mae Klong and Mekong rivers in south-east Asia.
