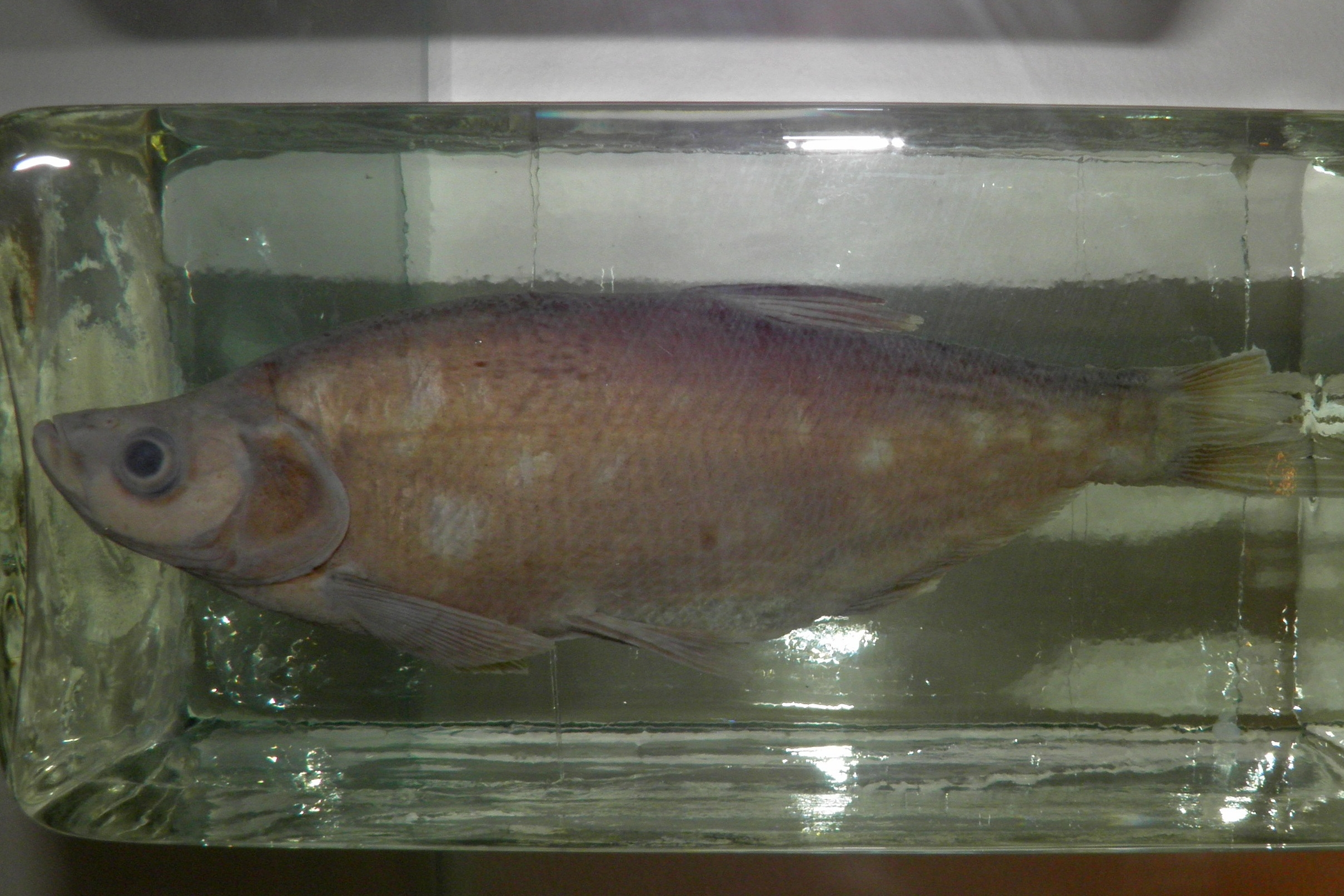
- Museum specimen (living are silvery in colour)

Conservation status
- Least Concern (IUCN 3.1)

Scientific classification
- Kingdom: Animalia
- Phylum: Chordata
- Class: Actinopterygii
- Order: Cypriniformes
- Family: Xenocyprididae
- Genus: Culter
- Species: C. alburnus

Binomial name
- Culter alburnus Basilewsky, 1855

Synonyms
- Erythroculter ilishaeformis

= Culter alburnus =

Species of fish

Culter alburnus, the topmouth culter, is an East Asian species of freshwater ray-finned fish genus Culter, this belongs to the family Xenocyprididae.

== Geographic distribution and habitat ==
Culter alburnus occurs in Lake Buir, the Onon and Kherlen River drainages in Mongolia, as well as the Amur and Red River drainages in Far East Russia and China, it has also been recorded from Taiwan and Hainan. It can be found in rivers and floodplain lakes which have dense growth of macrophytes.
