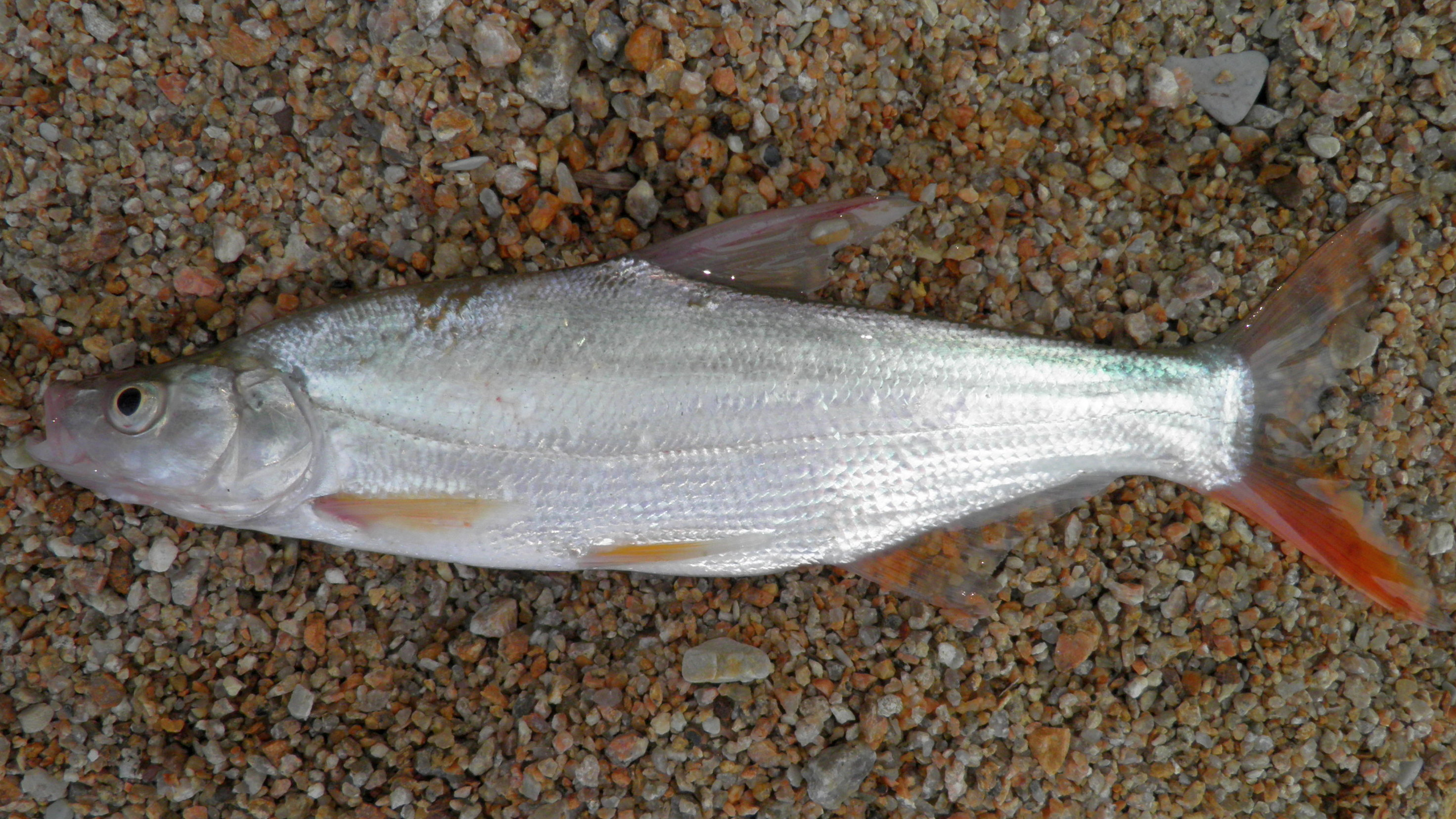

Conservation status
- Least Concern (IUCN 3.1)

Scientific classification
- Kingdom: Animalia
- Phylum: Chordata
- Class: Actinopterygii
- Order: Cypriniformes
- Suborder: Cyprinoidei
- Family: Xenocyprididae
- Genus: Chanodichthys
- Species: C. mongolicus

Binomial name
- Chanodichthys mongolicus (Basilewsky, 1855)

Synonyms
- Leptocephalus mongolicus Basilewsky, 1855; Erythroculter mongolicus (Basilewsky 1855); Culter rutilus Dybowski, 1872; Erythroculter mongolicus elongatus J. C. He & Z. H. Liu, 1980

= Mongolian redfin =

Species of fish

The Mongolian redfin (Chanodichthys mongolicus) is a species of ray-finned fish in the genus Chanodichthys, a genus belonging to the family Xenocyprididae, the East Asian minnows or sharpbellies. This fish is found in China, Russia and Mongolia where it ranges from the Amur River south to the Yangtze and inland to Lake Buir and Kherlen River. There are also records from the Red River in Vietnam that probably are this species. It reaches 1 m (3 ft 3 in) in length and 4 kg (8.8 lb) in weight.
