= Chanodichthys flavipinnis =

Conservation status
- Data Deficient (IUCN 3.1)

Scientific classification
- Kingdom: Animalia
- Phylum: Chordata
- Class: Actinopterygii
- Order: Cypriniformes
- Suborder: Cyprinoidei
- Family: Xenocyprididae
- Genus: Chanodichthys
- Species: C. flavipinnis

Binomial name
- Chanodichthys flavipinnis Tirant, 1883

Synonyms
- Culter flavipinnis Tirant, 1883

Species of fish

Chanodichthys flavipinnis is a species of freshwater ray-finned fish belonging to the family Xenocyprididae, the East Asian minnows or sharpbellies. This species is endemic to Vietnam.
