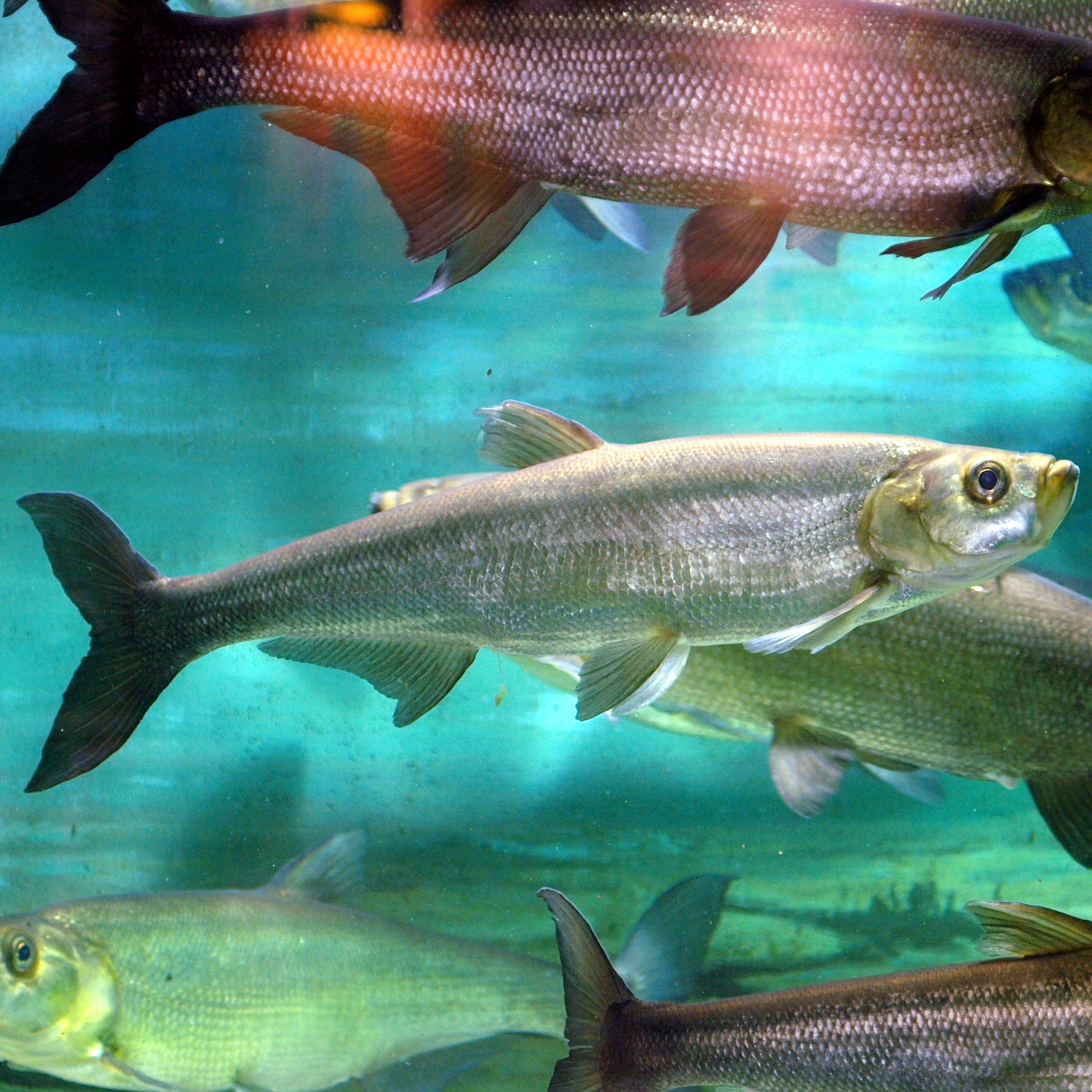

Conservation status
- Least Concern (IUCN 3.1)

Scientific classification
- Kingdom: Animalia
- Phylum: Chordata
- Class: Actinopterygii
- Order: Cypriniformes
- Family: Xenocyprididae
- Genus: Chanodichthys
- Species: C. erythropterus

Binomial name
- Chanodichthys erythropterus (Basilewsky, 1855)

Synonyms
- Culter erythropterus Basilewsky, 1855; Erythroculter erythropterus (Basilewsky, 1855); Culter ilishaeformis Bleeker, 1871; Culter sieboldii Dybowski, 1872; Culter aokii Ōshima, 1919

= Predatory carp =

Species of fish

The predatory carp (Chanodichthys erythropterus), also known as the redfin culter or skygazer, is a species of ray-finned fish belonging to the family Xenocyprididae, the East Asian minnows or sharpbellies. This species ranges from the Amur River south to Taiwan and the Red River, as well as Lake Buir in Mongolia. It reaches 102 cm (3 ft 4 in) in length and 9 kg (19 lb 13 oz) in weight.
