= Chanodichthys recurviceps =

Conservation status
- Least Concern (IUCN 3.1)

Scientific classification
- Kingdom: Animalia
- Phylum: Chordata
- Class: Actinopterygii
- Order: Cypriniformes
- Suborder: Cyprinoidei
- Family: Xenocyprididae
- Genus: Chanodichthys
- Species: C. recurviceps

Binomial name
- Chanodichthys recurviceps (J. Richardson, 1846)

Synonyms
- Leuciscus recurviceps J. Richardson, 1846; Culter recurviceps (J. Richardson, 1846); Erythroculter pseudobrevicauda Nichols & Pope, 1927

Species of fish

Chanodichthys recurviceps is a species of freshwater ray-finned fish belonging to the family Xenocyprididae. This species occurs in the Pearl River and Hainan in southern China.
