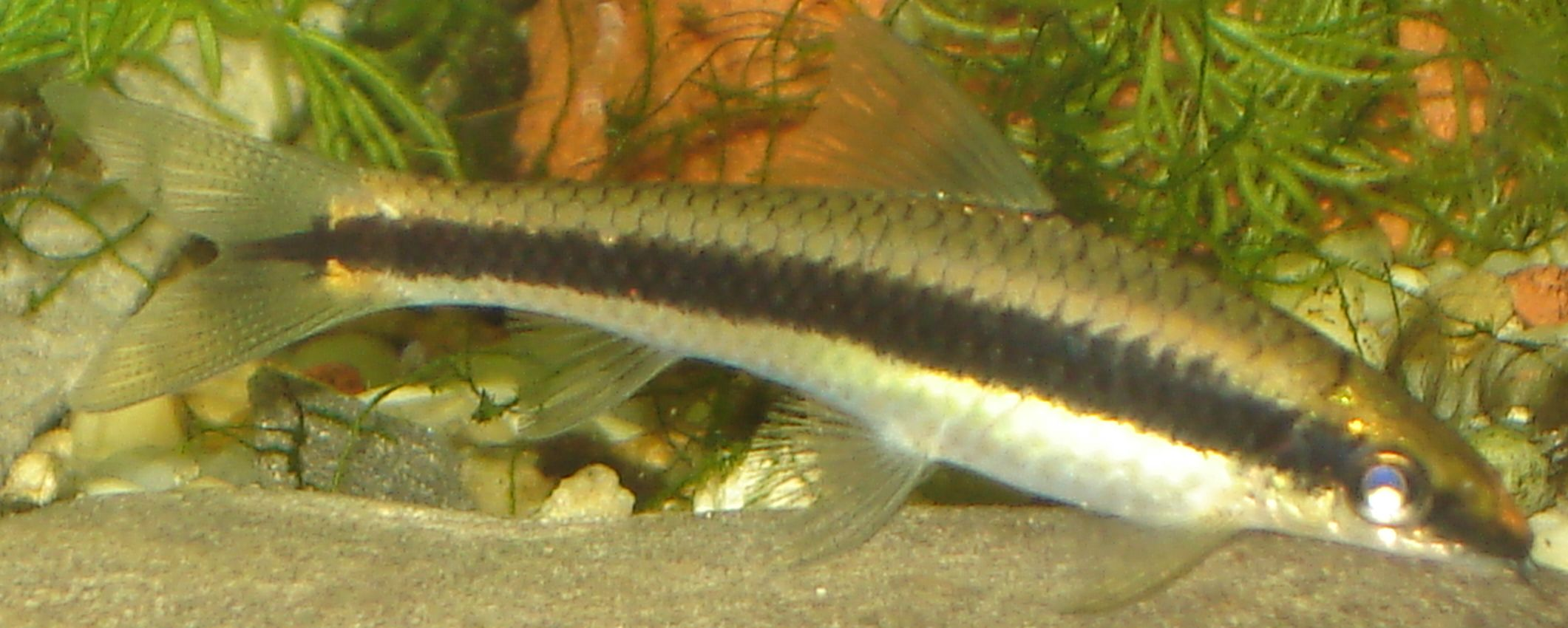

Conservation status
- Least Concern (IUCN 3.1)

Scientific classification
- Kingdom: Animalia
- Phylum: Chordata
- Class: Actinopterygii
- Order: Cypriniformes
- Family: Cyprinidae
- Subfamily: Labeoninae
- Genus: Crossocheilus
- Species: C. oblongus

Binomial name
- Crossocheilus oblongus Kuhl & van Hasselt, 1823

Synonyms
- Labeo oblongus (Cuvier & Valenciennes, 1842); Crossocheilus siamensis (Smith, 1931); Epalzeorhynchos siamensis Smith, 1931; Epalzeorhynchos stigmaeus Smith, 1945

= Siamese algae-eater =

True Siamese algae-eater

Species of fish

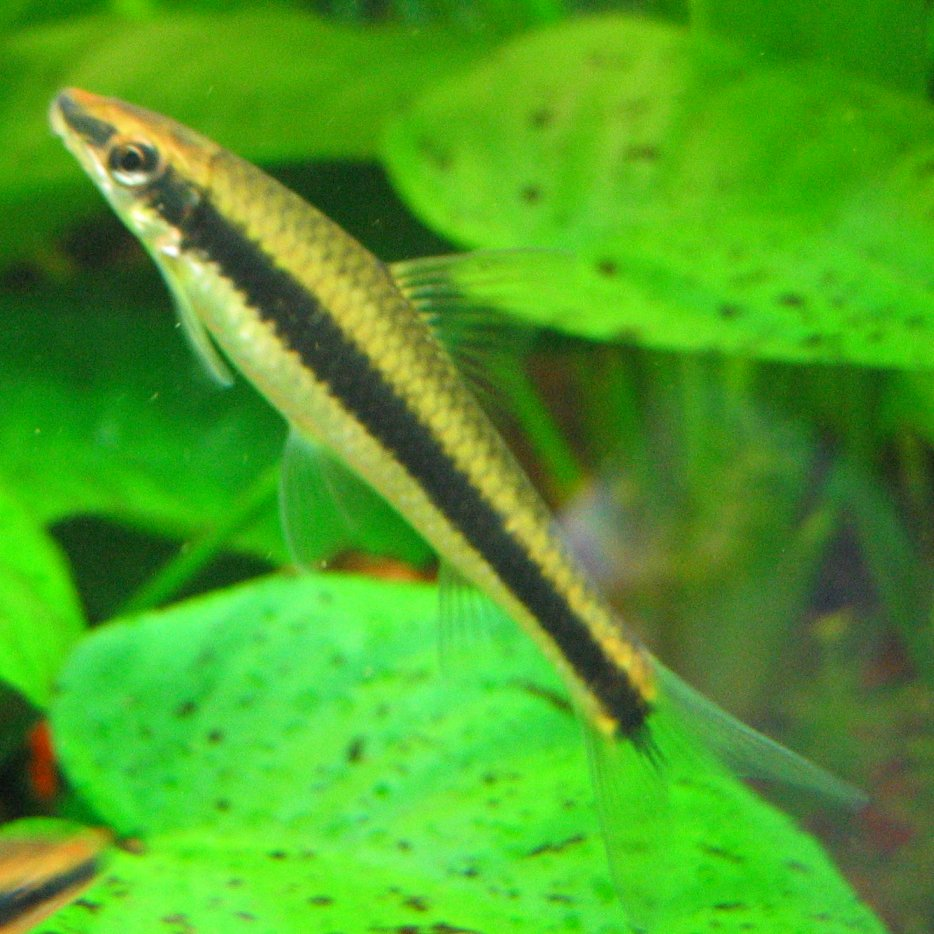
Siamese algae-eater in the aquarium

The Siamese algae-eater (Crossocheilus oblongus) is a species of freshwater fish in the carp family, Cyprinidae. This bottom-dwelling tropical fish is found in Mainland Southeast Asia, including the Chao Phraya and Mekong basins as well as the Malay Peninsula. Its natural habitats are streams and rivers as well as flooded forests during the rainy season. The Siamese algae-eater should not be confused with the flying fox (Epalzeorhynchos kalopterus) or the false siamensis (Garra cambodgiensis), lacking the distinctive black bands of the former.

== Description ==
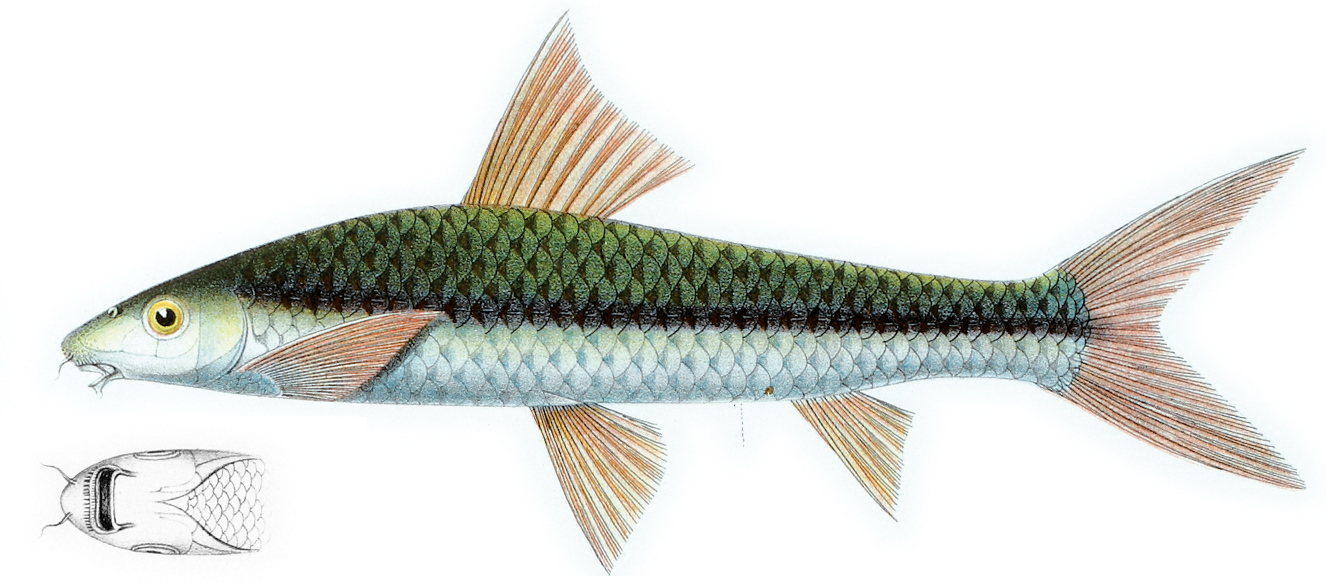
Illustration of true Siamese algae eater by Pieter Bleeker

The Siamese algae-eater has a black horizontal stripe extending from nose to end of tail. The stripe can quickly fade to camouflage the fish against its surroundings, which is observed during fights or stress. Genuine Crossocheilus siamensis, without maxillary barbels and with deeply fringed V-shaped upper lip are rarely encountered in the aquarium trade.

Siamese algae-eaters can grow up to 15 centimetres (6 inches) within two years, and live for over 10 years in optimal conditions. They are valued in the aquarium trade for being the only known fish species to consume red algae, including ‘black brush’ or ‘beard’ algae.

Closely related is the red algae-eater Crossocheilus langei, a species that is widely sold as the Siamese algae-eater. It has a bright brownish elongate body with a slightly flat belly. It has a prominent brown-black horizontal stripe extending from nose to tail. This fish may grow to measure up to 16 centimetres (6.3 in). It possesses small maxillary barbels and an unfringed shallowly arcuate upper lip. Two other similar species are traded as Siamese algae-eaters, namely Crossocheilus atrilimes, a species that prefers Java moss to red algae, and an undescribed species of Crossocheilus.

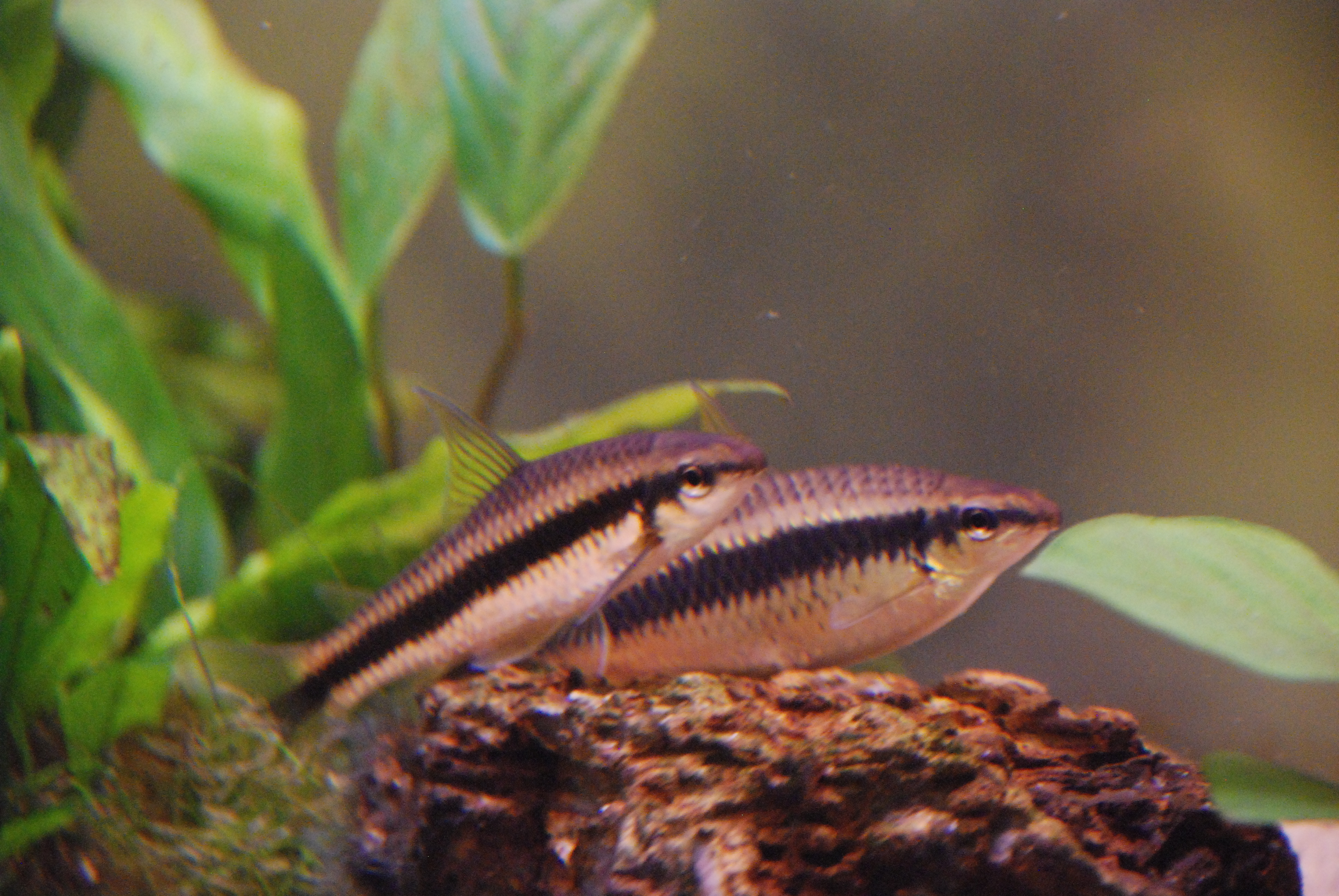
Two fish of the Crossocheilus genus resting on a rock

== Aquarium care ==
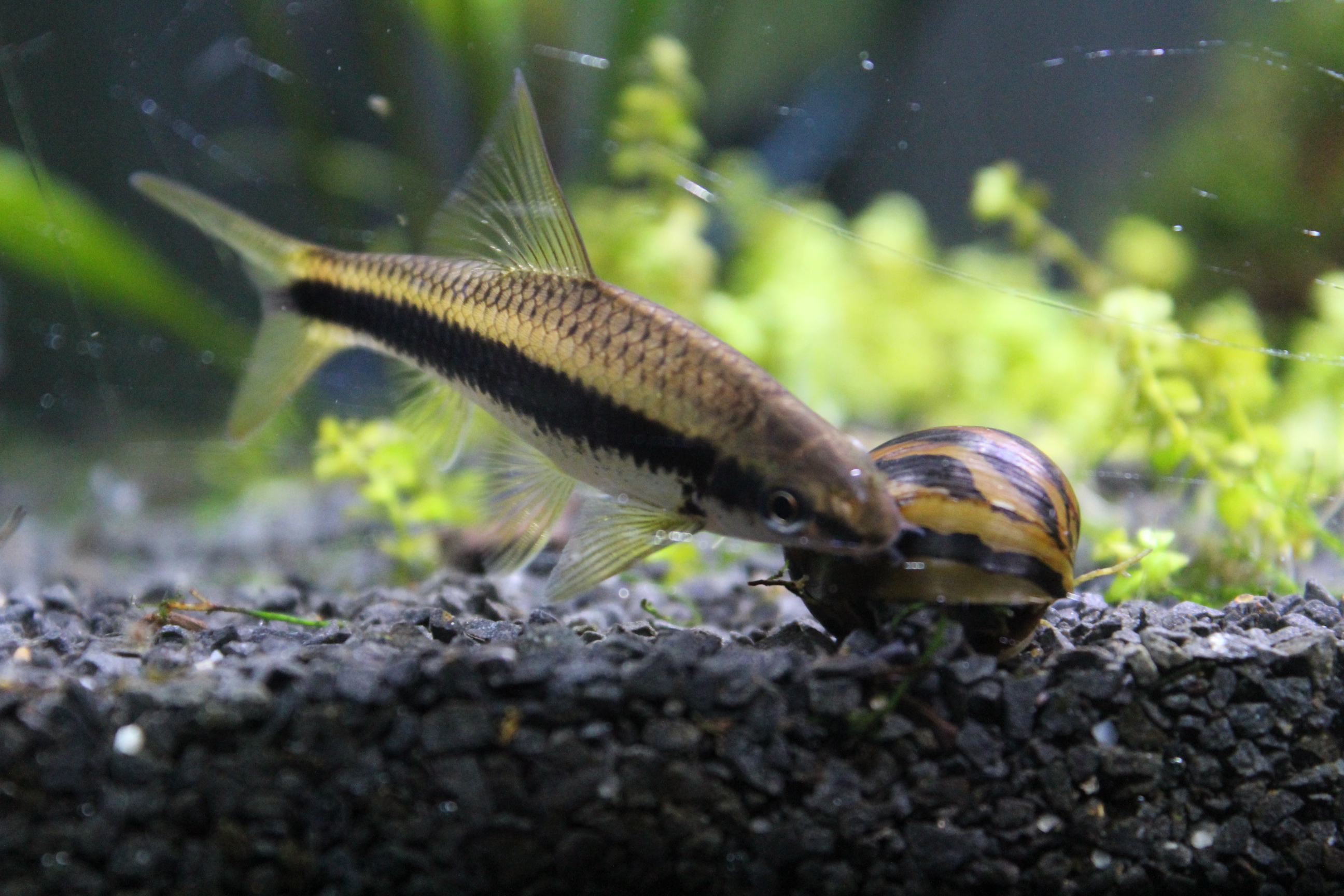
A true Siamese algae eater interacting with a nerite snail in an aquarium

The hardy red algae-eater Crossocheilus langei is commonly found in the aquarium trade and is one of the most popular and effective tank algae cleaners. They are active and fast swimmers that will school together if kept in a group, but some individuals may display aggression to their own kind or related fish. In general, the red algae-eater can be kept in most community tanks and is reportedly much less aggressive than similar fish such as the Chinese algae-eater or the red-tailed black shark and the rainbow shark.

It prefers water temperature range of 24–26 °C (75–79 °F), a pH range of 6.5–8.0, and a water hardness of 5–20 dH. Because the red algae-eater is effective at controlling tank algae, many aquarists like to place them in heavily planted tanks with strong lighting to prevent the growth of algae. Unlike other aquarium algae eater fishes, the red algae-eater is valued for its ability to eat red algae (particularly Audouinella). The fish, however, is an opportunistic feeder and will eat pellets and most other food, a tendency that strengthens with age.

The lid of the tank should be properly closed leaving no large hole for the fish to jump out of the tank.

Since they cannot stay in mid water, they love driftwood/rocks and some plants that can support their weight to rest on.

Siamese algae-eaters will often school together, but are also content living solo. When two are kept together, they will often establish their own territory as they mature. They can be a long living fish, with reports of lifespans up to ten years.
