= Rhodeus rheinardti =

Conservation status
- Least Concern (IUCN 3.1)

Scientific classification
- Kingdom: Animalia
- Phylum: Chordata
- Class: Actinopterygii
- Order: Cypriniformes
- Suborder: Cyprinoidei
- Family: Acheilognathidae
- Genus: Rhodeus
- Species: R. rheinardti

Binomial name
- Rhodeus rheinardti (Tirant, 1883)

Synonyms
- Danio rheinardti Tirant, 1883

Species of fish

Rhodeus rheinardti is a tropical freshwater ray-finned fish belonging to the family Acheilognathidae, the bitterlings. It originates in the Perfume River, near Hué, Vietnam. It was originally described as Danio rheinardti by G. Tirant in 1883.

Named possibly in honor of Pierre-Paul Rheinart (1840-1902), a French official in Hué, Viêt Nam (type locality for this bitterling), who sent zoological specimens to Paris.

When spawning, the females deposit their eggs inside bivalves, where they hatch and the young remain until they can swim.
