= Chanodichthys oxycephalus =

Conservation status
- Least Concern (IUCN 3.1)

Scientific classification
- Kingdom: Animalia
- Phylum: Chordata
- Class: Actinopterygii
- Order: Cypriniformes
- Suborder: Cyprinoidei
- Family: Xenocyprididae
- Genus: Chanodichthys
- Species: C. oxycephalus

Binomial name
- Chanodichthys oxycephalus (Bleeker, 1871)

Synonyms
- Culter oxycephalus Bleeker, 1871; Culter oxycephaloides Kreyenberg & Pappenheim, 1908

Species of fish

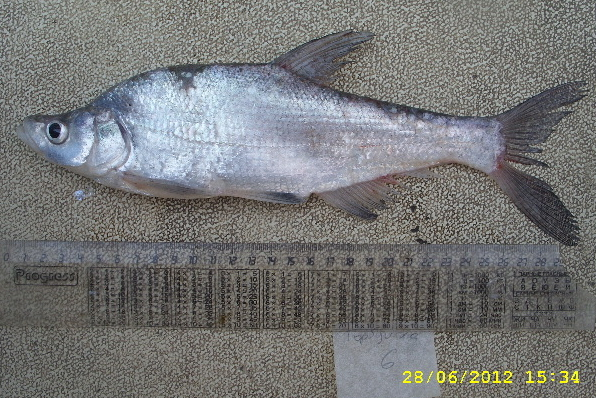
Chanodichthys oxycephalus

Chanodichthys oxycephalus is a species of freshwater ray-finned fish belonging to the family Xenocyprididae. This species occurs in the Amur and Yangtze river basins in eastern Russia, Korea and China.
