= Namtok Kaeng Sopha =

Kaeng Sopha Waterfall
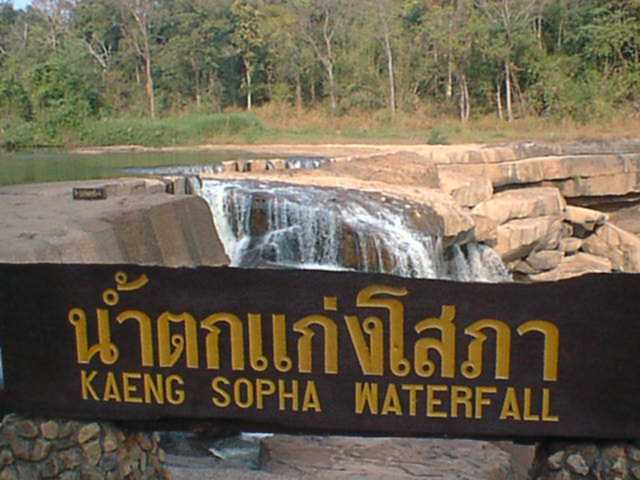
- Interactive map of Kaeng Sopha Waterfall
- Location: Thung Salaeng Luang National Park, Phitsanulok Province, Thailand
- Coordinates: 16°52′16″N 100°50′7″E
- Type: Tiered
- Number of drops: 3
- Watercourse: Wang Thong River

Namtok Kaeng Sopha (Thai: น้ำตกแก่งโสภา) is a waterfall in Wang Thong District, Phitsanulok Province, Thailand. It is in Thung Salaeng Luang National Park on the Wang Thong River off of Lomsak Road (Highway 12). It is the largest waterfall in Phitsanulok. Kaeng Sopha is a tiered waterfall shaped like a stairway. Kaeng Sopha is the subject of a June 2007 postage stamp in Thailand in the Thailand Waterfall series.
