= Barbodes aurotaeniatus =

Conservation status
- Least Concern (IUCN 3.1)

Scientific classification
- Kingdom: Animalia
- Phylum: Chordata
- Class: Actinopterygii
- Order: Cypriniformes
- Family: Cyprinidae
- Genus: Barbodes
- Species: B. aurotaeniatus

Binomial name
- Barbodes aurotaeniatus (Tirant, 1885)

Synonyms
- Barbus aurotaeniatus Tirant, 1885; Puntius aurotaeniatus (Tirant, 1885); Systomus aurotaeniatus (Tirant, 1885); Puntius stigmatosomus H. M. Smith, 1931; Barbus stigmatosomus H. M. Smith, 1931; Barbus pessuliferus Fowler, 1937; Puntius pessuliferus (Fowler, 1937); Puntius samatensis H. M. Smith, 1945

Species of fish

Barbodes aurotaeniatus is a species of cyprinid fish native to the Mekong River and Chao Phraya River as well as smaller coastal drainage systems that flow into the Gulf of Thailand. This species can reach a length of 9 cm (3.5 in) TL.
