= Namtok Kaeng Song =

Kaeng Song Waterfall
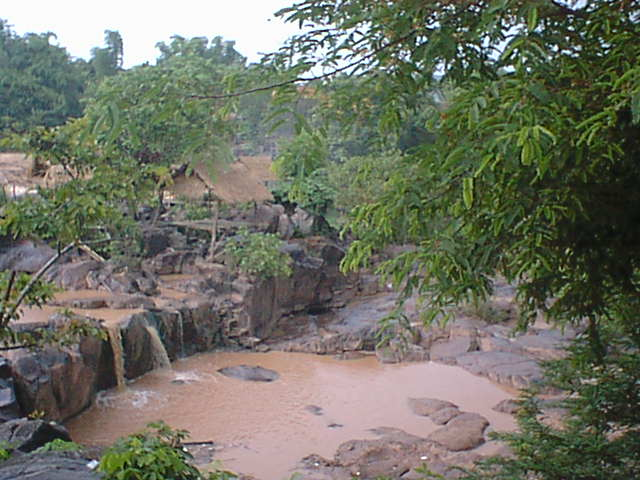
- Interactive map of Kaeng Song Waterfall
- Location: Wang Thong District, Phitsanulok Province, Thailand
- Coordinates: 16°51′59″N 100°37′56″E
- Watercourse: Wang Thong River

Namtok Kaeng Song (Thai: น้ำตกแก่งซอง) is a waterfall in the Wang Thong District of Phitsanulok Province in Thailand. It is on the Wang Thong River near kilometer 45 of Lomsak Road (Highway 12).

== Gallery ==
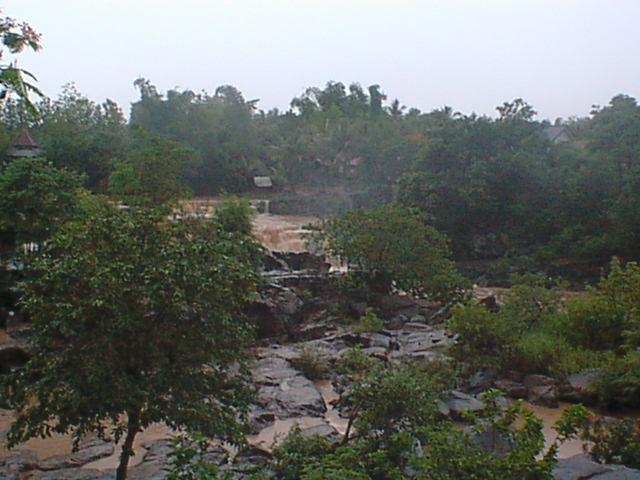
Namtok Kaeng Song

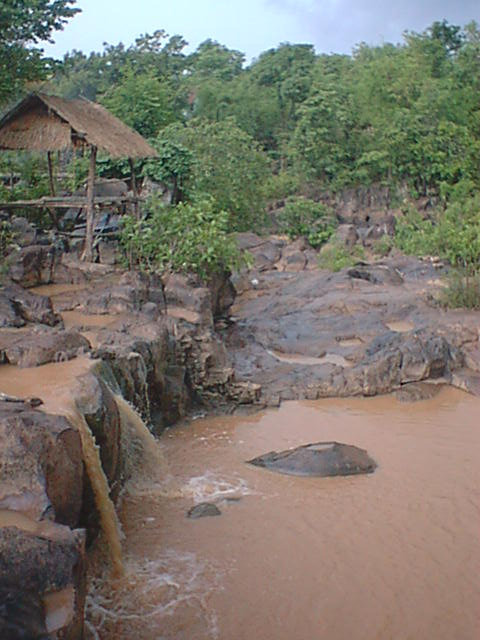
Namtok Kaeng Song

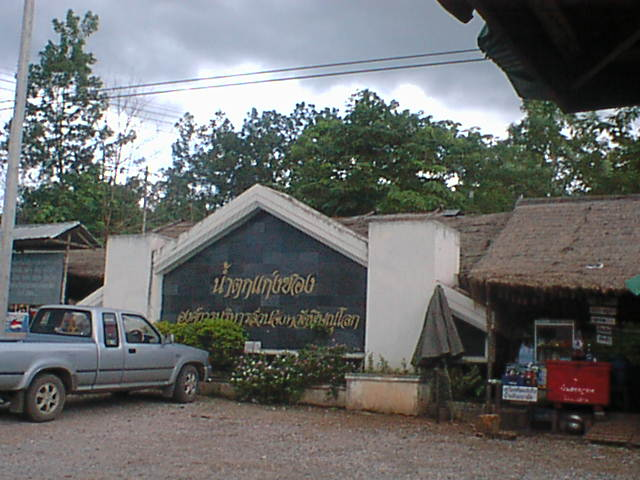
Sign at entrance to Namtok Kaeng Song

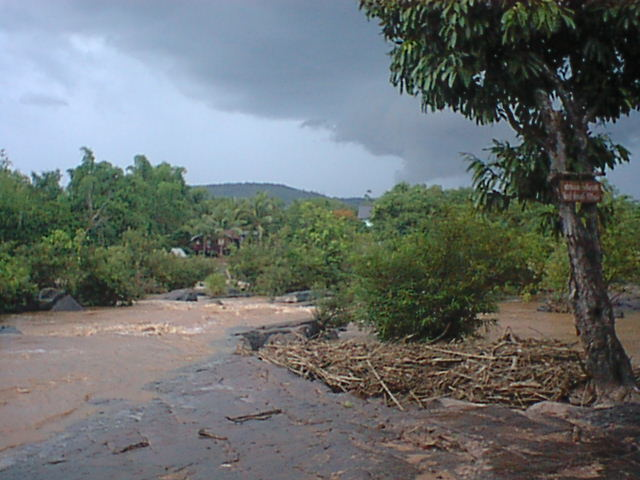
Rapids at Namtok Kaeng Song

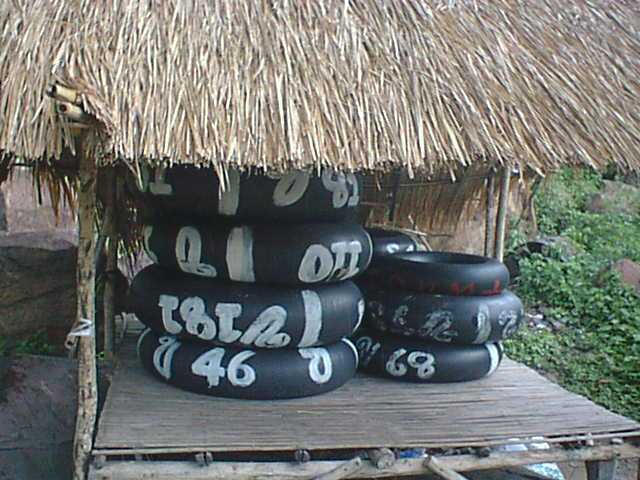
Tire tubes at Namtok Kaeng Song

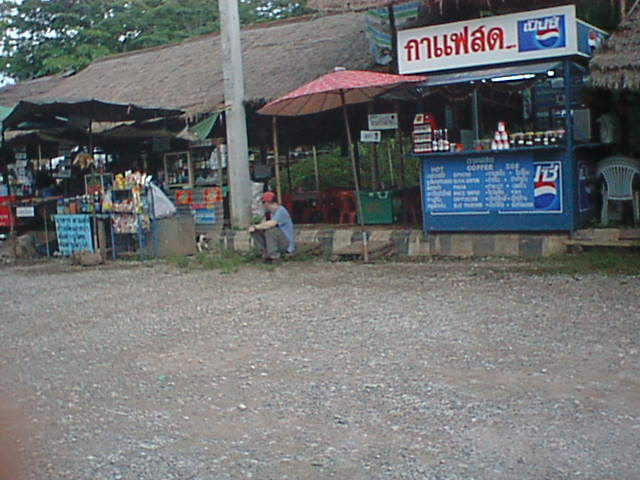
Concession stands at Namtok Kaeng Song
