= Wang Thong River =

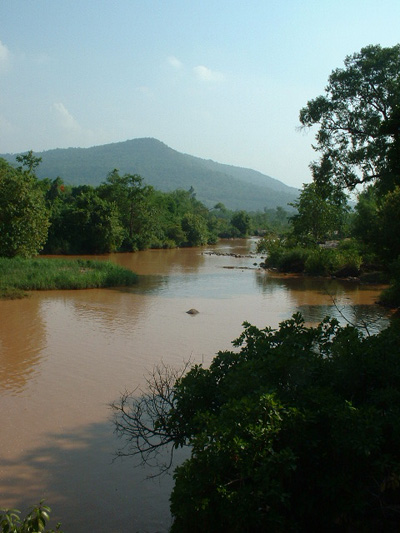
- Wang Thong River in Wang Thong

Location
- Country: Thailand

Physical characteristics
- Source
  - location: Phetchabun Mountains in the Khao Kho District, Thailand
- Mouth
  - location: Nan River at
  - coordinates: 16°31′06″N 100°19′36″E

The Wang Thong River (Thai: แคววังทอง, RTGS: Khwae Wang Thong, IPA: [kʰwɛː waŋ tʰɔːŋ], also known as the Khek River) is a river in Thailand. Its source lies in the Phetchabun Mountains in the Khao Kho District, Thailand. It flows through Thung Salaeng Luang National Park and forms Namtok Sri Dit and Namtok Kaeng Sopha (Kaeng Sopha Waterfall) in the Wang Thong District of Phitsanulok Province, and finally flows through into the Bang Krathum District, passing through Ban Sam Ruen and on to the border of Phitsanulok and Phichit, where it drains into the Nan River at 16°31′06″N 100°19′36″E. The land drained by the Wang Thong River is part of the Nan Basin and the Chao Phraya Watershed.

== Etymology ==
Of the names Khek and Wang Thong, Khek (Thai: เข็ก) is the older name for the river. The word 'Khek' is also another name for the ethnicity more commonly known as Hakka. The two words are cognates of Chinese 客家 (meaning house-guest). The river derives its modern name Wang Thong from its path through Amphoe Wang Thong. The first element wang (Thai: วัง) means palace. The second element thong (Thai: ทอง) means gold. This Thai word for gold was borrowed from the Tamil language of Sri Lanka. The name of the river translates to River of the Golden Palace.

== History ==
The early Ban Wang Thong and Ban Saphan communities relied heavily on the Wang Thong River. Before the construction of highways, most traffic to Phichit and Nakhon Sawan was via boat.

== Brotherly Villages Boat Race ==
The Wang Thong river was historically the site for a boat race between the villagers of Ban Wang Thong and Ban Saphan. The race took place annually in November after the rainy season. The original boat race was discontinued prior to the 1940s. In 1982, a plan to reintroduce the Brotherly Villages Boat Race was discussed by senior local officials, the traders of the Wang Thong Market, farmer organizations and the abbot of Wat Bang Saphan to promote the unity of the community. Rather than having one village compete against the other as in earlier days, the new boat race involves competition between local farmer and village organizations. The first race in the reborn competition was opened by District Officer Naaj Amphoe. The present form of the boat race involves less ritual activities than the pre-1940s races.

== Khek River Rafting Festival ==
Tourists come to the Wang Thong River to see the waterfalls along its path, and to engage in rafting. Rapids along the river include the Wang Nam Yen Rapids within Thung Salaeng Luang National Park. Some portions of the Wang Thong River are designated level 5 rafting sites. This level of whitewater is the uppermost limit to rafting, meaning the river is wild, with a rapid current and difficult, steep rapids. The level of difficulty of the current depends on the volume of water flow. In the rainy season, the river becomes swifter. In June 2005, Phitsanulok Province initiated a campaign entitled "Sip Coffee at Kaeng Song, Paddle Along Nam Khek Rapids," and held the first Khek River Rafting Festival. The next Khek River Rafting Festival was held from July 7 through the end of October 2006 and the next from July 1 through October 31, 2007, under the name "Kaeng Song Cafe - Khek river rafting festival."

== Waterfalls ==
- Kaeng Song Waterfall
- Kaeng Sopha Waterfall
- Sri Dit Waterfall
- Wang Nok Aen Waterfall

== Bueng Rachanok ==
Bueng Rachanok (Thai: บึงราชนก) is a swamp along the Wang Thong River within the Wang Thong District of Phitsanulok Province. The swamp was renovated in 1994 by Phitsanulok Provincial Administration Organization, and is now a popular tourist attraction.

== Hydroelectric power ==
A study has been done at Naresuan University, Faculty of Engineering, to consider the practicalities of using the river's 18-metre (60 ft) drop within the Salaeng Luang National Park to generate hydroelectric power.

== Wildlife ==
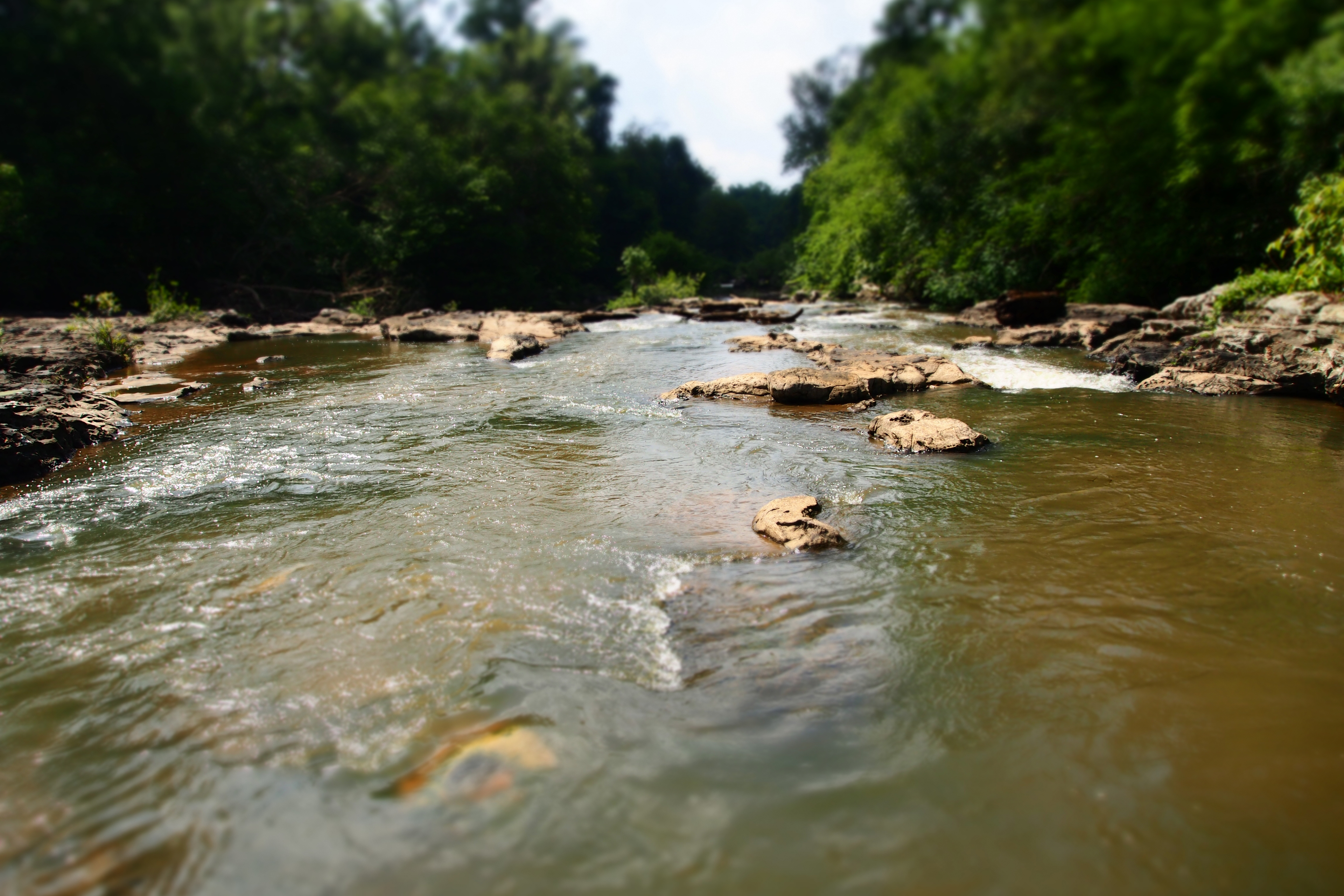
Kaeng Bang Rachan

Kaeng Bang Rachan at the source of the Wang Thong is a natural habitat for the freshwater jellyfish (Craspedacusta sowerbii) which is presently found in only the United States, Russia, the United Kingdom, Japan and Thailand. Also, it is a natural habitat for rare species of butterflies such as kaiser, Troides helena and Euploea.

== Royal visit ==
King Rama IX visited the Wang Thong River to inspect the Khek River Basin Development Project at Lom Sak District of Phetchabun Province on 24 February 1981. The purpose of the inspection was in relation to the king's multi-purpose irrigation projects.
