= Gyrinocheilus pustulosus =

Scientific classification
- Domain: Eukaryota
- Kingdom: Animalia
- Phylum: Chordata
- Class: Actinopterygii
- Order: Cypriniformes
- Family: Gyrinocheilidae
- Genus: Gyrinocheilus
- Species: G. pustulosus

Binomial name
- Gyrinocheilus pustulosus Vaillant, 1902

Species of fish

Gyrinocheilus pustulosus (common name: Borneo algae-eater) is a species of cyprinid of the genus Gyrinocheilus. It inhabits the Kapuas, Mahakam and Kayan basins of Indonesian Borneo. It is ten dorsal soft rays and 39 or 40 vertebrae. Unsexed males have a maximum length of 35.5 centimetres (14.0 in). It was described by George Clapp Vaillant in 1902. It is classified as "data deficient" on the IUCN Red List and considered harmless to humans.
