= Tham Phra Wang Daeng =

Cave in Phitsanulok province, Thailand

- Cave of the Monk
- Interactive map of Tham Phra Wang Daeng
- Location: Thung Salaeng Luang National Park, Amphoe Noen Maprang, Phitsanulok Province
- Coordinates: 16.6806°N 100.6914°E
- Length: 13,789 m
- Discovery: 1997–2004

Tham Phra Wang Daeng, also known as the Cave of the Monk (Thai: ถ้ำพระวังแดง), is a deep cave located in Thung Salaeng Luang National Park, Amphoe Noen Maprang, Phitsanulok Province, upper central Thailand. It is the longest cave in Thailand, the distance is about 13 kilometers. Buddhist statues and relics, carvings and reliefs, a subterranean river, multiple bat colonies, and a trove of speleothems populate the cave. In 2003, a biological expedition to the cave resulted in the discovery of new fish species, including discoveries in the Balitoridae and Cyprinidae families.

== See also ==
- List of caves
- Speleology
