= Chanodichthys dabryi =

Humpback

Conservation status
- Least Concern (IUCN 3.1)

Scientific classification
- Kingdom: Animalia
- Phylum: Chordata
- Class: Actinopterygii
- Order: Cypriniformes
- Suborder: Cyprinoidei
- Family: Xenocyprididae
- Genus: Chanodichthys
- Species: C. dabryi

Binomial name
- Chanodichthys dabryi (Bleeker, 1871)

Synonyms
- Culter dabryi Bleeker, 1871; Erythroculter dabryi (Bleeker, 1871); Culter hypselonotus Bleeker, 1871; Erythroculter hypselonotus (Bleeker, 1871)

Species of fish

Chanodichthys dabryi, the humpback or lake skygazer, is a species of ray-finned fish in the genus Chanodichthys. This freshwater species belongs to the family Xenocyprididae. The humpback is found in China and Russia where it ranges from the Amur River to the Yangtze. It is fished, but remains common. As presently defined, it is likely species complex. It reaches 42 cm (1 ft 5 in) in length and 700 g (1.5 lb) in weight.

== Etymology ==
Named in honor of Pierre Dabry de Thiersant (1826-1898), fish culturist, French counsel to China, and student of Chinese fishes, who sent specimens to the Muséum d'Histoire naturelle de Paris.
