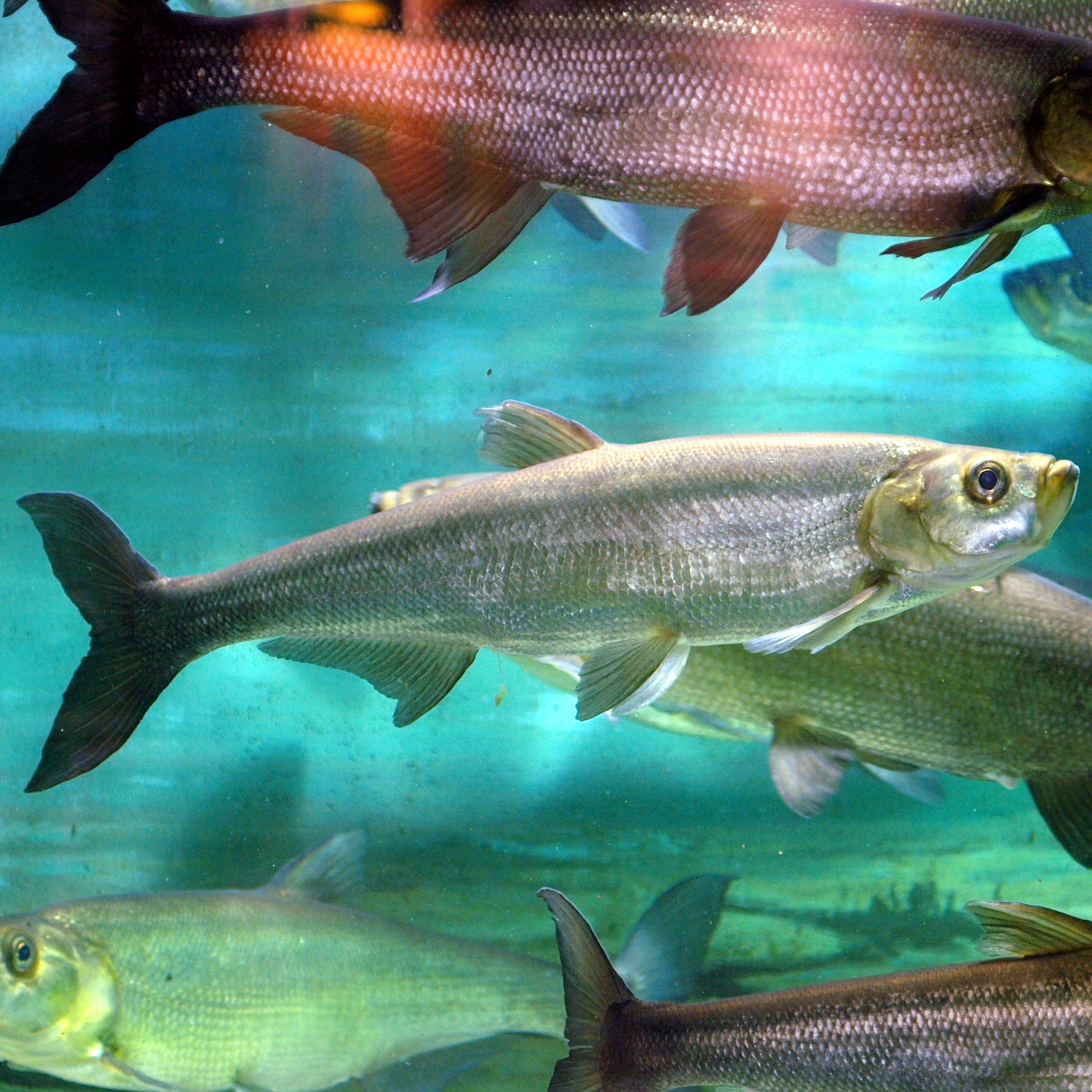
- Predatory carp (Chanodichthys erythropterus)

Scientific classification
- Kingdom: Animalia
- Phylum: Chordata
- Class: Actinopterygii
- Order: Cypriniformes
- Family: Xenocyprididae
- Genus: Chanodichthys; Bleeker, 1860

Type species
- Leptocephalus mongolicus Basilewsky, 1855

Synonyms
- Pseudoculter Bleeker, 1860; Erythroculter Berg, 1909

= Chanodichthys =

Genus of fishes

Chanodichthys is a genus of freshwater ray-finned fishes belonging to the family Xenocyprididae, the East Asian minnows or sharpbellies. The species in this genus are found in Eastern Asia. The name is derived from the Greek word chanos, meaning "abyss, mouth opened, inmensity", and the Greek word ichthys, meaning "fish". Chanodichthys is closely related to Culter and some species have been moved between these genera.

== Species ==
Chanodichthys contains the following species:

- Chanodichthys abramoides (Dybowski, 1872)
- Chanodichthys dabryi (Bleeker, 1871) (Humpback)
- Chanodichthys erythropterus (Basilewsky, 1855) (Predatory carp)
- Chanodichthys mongolicus (Basilewsky, 1855) (Mongolian redfin)
- Chanodichthys oxycephalus (Bleeker, 1871)
- Chanodichthys recurviceps (J. Richardson, 1846)
