= Spotted porcelain crab =

Spotted porcelain crab is a common name for several crabs and may refer to:

- Neopetrolisthes maculatus, native to the Indo-Pacific Ocean
- Porcellana sayana, native to the western Atlantic Ocean
