= Namtok Si Dit =

Waterfall in Thailand

Si Dit Waterfall
- น้ำตกศรีดิษฐ์
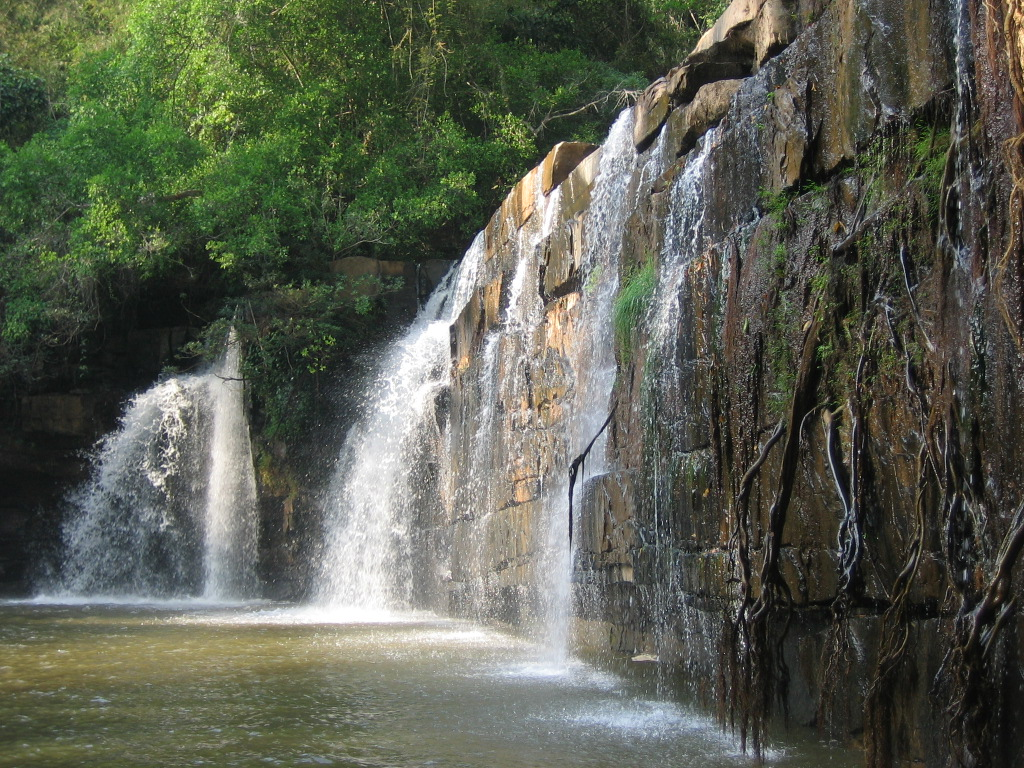

- Location within Thailand
- Location: Khao Kho, Phetchabun, Thailand
- Coordinates: 16°37′48″N 100°56′23″E
- Watercourse: Saleang Heng Canal

Namtok Si Dit (Thai: น้ำตกศรีดิษฐ์) is a waterfall and tourist attraction in Thailand. The waterfall is on the Wang Thong River and it runs throughout the year. At the falls, there is a rice mortar using power generated from the waterfall, built by the Communist Party of Thailand.
