= Thung Salaeng Luang National Park =

National park of Thailand

- IUCN category II (national park)
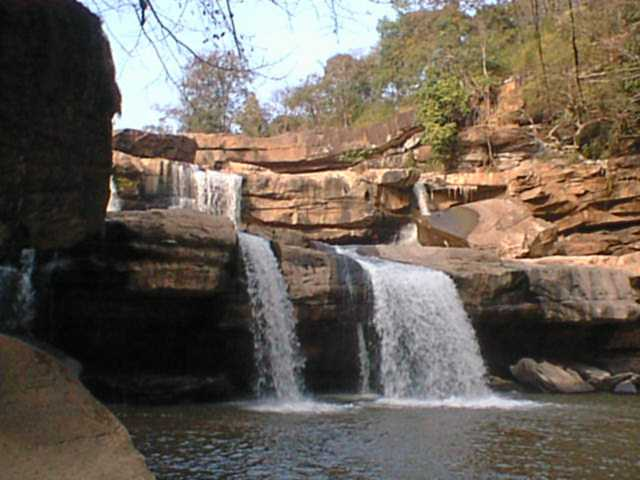
- Kaeng Sopha waterfall

- Location within Thailand
- Location: Phitsanulok, Phetchabun Provinces, Thailand
- Coordinates: 16°49′40″N 100°52′12″E
- Area: 1,262 km (784 mi)
- Established: 27 May 1963
- Visitors: 52,126 (in 2019)
- Governing body: Department of National Parks, Wildlife and Plant Conservation

Thung Salaeng Luang National Park (Thai: อุทยานแห่งชาติทุ่งแสลงหลวง, RTGS: Utthayan Haeng Chat Thung Salaeng Luang) is a 1,262 square kilometres (487 sq mi) national park in Phitsanulok and Phetchabun Provinces of Thailand. It encompasses substantial portions of Wang Thong and Lom Sak Districts.

== Topography ==
The park consists of limestone hills, slate and hardpan at altitudes ranging from 300 to 1,028 metres (984 to 3,373 ft), Khao Khae is the highest point in the park. Thung Salaeng Luang is inlaid with meadows, especially in the southern portions of the park. The park is the source of numerous streams. There are large salt licks at Pong Sai in the northwest and Pong Thung Phaya in the southwest. The Wang Thong River flows through the park.

== History ==
Thung Salaeng Luang was proposed for inclusion in the national parks system In 1959. Thung Salaeng Luang was declared the 3rd national park in 1963, covering an area of 1,282 square kilometres (495 sq mi). At the request of the Thai Army 20 square kilometres (7.7 sq mi) were withdrawn from the national park. That is why a "new" national park area was created in 1972. Thung Salaeng Luang was "reestablished" as a national park on 27 May 1975, covering an area of 789,000 rai ≈1,262 square kilometres (487 sq mi). From the late-1960s to the early-1980s, the park's forest was used as a base for guerrillas of the Communist Party of Thailand.

== Flora ==
The park features numerous forest types, including hill evergreen, conifer, tropical evergreen, dry evergreen, mixed deciduous and dry dipterocarp forest.
Plant species have a significant variety:
Evergreen species:

- Baccaurea ramiflora
- Canarium subulatum
- Castanopsis spp.
- Cinnamomum cassia
- Cratoxylum maingayi
- Dillenia obovata
- Garcinia cowa
- Lithocarpus spp.
- Magnolia champaca
- Pinus latteri
- Podocarpus neriifolius

Dipterocarp species:

- Anisoptera costata
- Dipterocarpus alatus
- Dipterocarpus obtusifolius
- Dipterocarpus tuberculatus
- Hopea ferrea
- Hopea odorata
- Shorea obtusa
- Shorea siamensis
- Shorea thorelii

Deciduous species:

- Adenanthera pavonina
- Afzelia xylocarpa
- Aphanamixis polystachya
- Aquilaria crassna
- Bombax ceiba
- Calamus rotang
- Dalbergia balansae
- Dalbergia cochinchinensis
- Dalbergia oliveri
- Diospyros ebenum
- Ficus foveolata
- Hydnocarpus ilicifolius
- Lagerstroemia spp.
- Mangifera indica
- Microcos paniculata
- Morinda elliptica
- Mussaenda parva
- Phoenix acaulis
- Phoenix loureiroi
- Phyllanthus emblica
- Polyalthia viridis
- Pometia pinnata
- Pterocarpus macrocarpus
- Quercus spp.
- Scleropyrum pentandrum
- Spondias mombin
- Sterculia villosa
- Strychnos nux-vomica
- Tectona grandis
- Terminalia nigrovenulosa
- Toona ciliata
- Vitex pinnata
- Wrightia arborea
- Xylia xylocarpa

Flowering plant species:

- Aloe vera
- Ardisia crenata
- Asplenium nidus
- Barleria strigosa
- Chloranthus erectus
- Christisonia siamensis
- Curcuma sessilis
- Dioscorea hispida
- Eriocaulon henryanum
- Gynura pseudochina
- Hydrocharis morsus-ranae
- Indigofera tinctoria
- Molineria latifolia
- Murdannia giganteum
- Platycerium holttumii
- Pseuderanthemum andersonii
- Pueraria mirifica
- Zingiber cassumunar

Carnivorous plant species include:

- Drosera burmanni
- Utricularia bifida
- Utricularia delphinioides

Orchids species include:

- Gastrochilus bellinus
- Spathoglottis pubescens

== Fauna ==
The number of sightings in the park are:
Mammals, include:

- Barking deer
- Golden jackal
- Black giant squirrel

Birds, the park has some 170 species, of which some 115 species of passerine from 37 families, represented by one species:

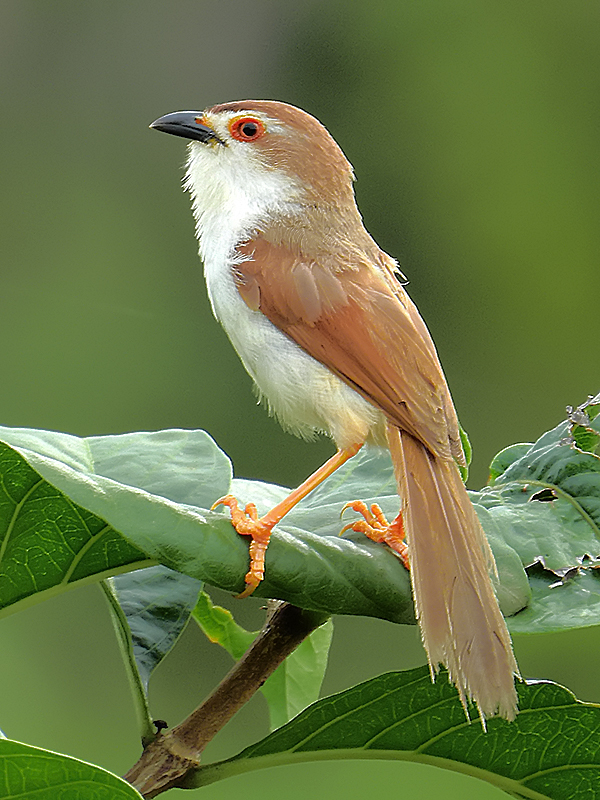
Yellow-eyed babbler

- Ashy drongo
- Ashy woodswallow
- Asian fairy-bluebird
- Bar-winged flycatcher-shrike
- Black-naped oriole
- Blyth's paradise flycatcher
- Brown-rumped minivet
- Brown shrike
- Buff-breasted babbler
- Chestnut-eared bunting
- Crimson sunbird
- Eurasian tree sparrow
- Golden-crested myna
- Golden-fronted leafbird
- Great iora
- Grey-headed canary-flycatcher
- Indochinese bushlark
- Japanese white-eye
- Lanceolated warbler
- Large-billed crow
- Large scimitar babbler
- Olive-backed pipit
- Red-rumped swallow
- Scaly-breasted munia
- Scarlet-backed flowerpecker
- Siberian blue robin
- Silver-breasted broadbill
- Stripe-throated bulbul
- Sultan tit
- Thick-billed warbler
- Two-barred warbler
- Velvet-fronted nuthatch
- White-bellied erpornis
- White-crested laughingthrush
- Yellow-bellied warbler
- Yellow-eyed babbler
- Zitting cisticola

and some 55 species of non-passerine from 20 families, represented by one species:

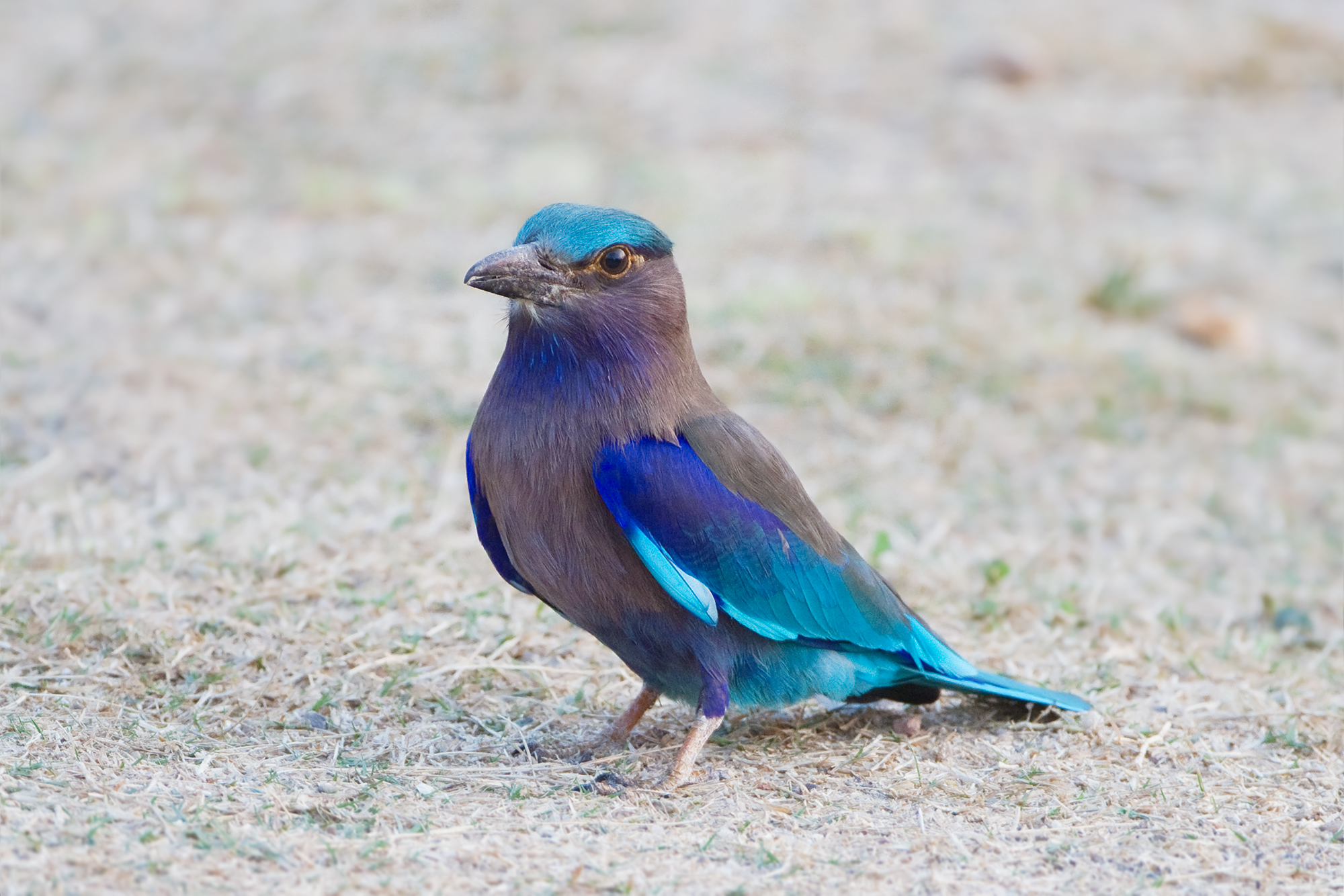
Indochinese roller

- Asian openbill
- Banded kingfisher
- Blue-bearded bee-eater
- Brown boobook
- Chinese pond heron
- Common kestrel
- Crested goshawk
- Crested treeswift
- Eurasian hoopoe
- Greater yellownape
- Green-billed malkoha
- Green-legged partridge
- Himalayan swiftlet
- Indochinese roller
- Lineated barbet
- Orange-breasted trogon
- Oriental pied-hornbill
- Red-wattled lapwing
- Vernal hanging parrot
- Zebra dove

Reptiles, include:

- Asian water monitor
- Big-headed turtle
- Blue krait
- Common butterfly lizard
- Golden tree snake
- Gumprecht's green pitviper
- Reticulated python
- Rice paddy snake
- Sunbeam snake
- Tokay gecko

Amphibians, include:

- Banded bullfrog
- Hong Kong whipping frog

Fishes, include:

- Emerald green betta
- Antimony fish
- Horseface loach
- Minnow
- Siamese mud carp
- Spotted algae eater
- Stone fish

Butterflies, include:

- Banded marquis
- Common archduke

== Places ==
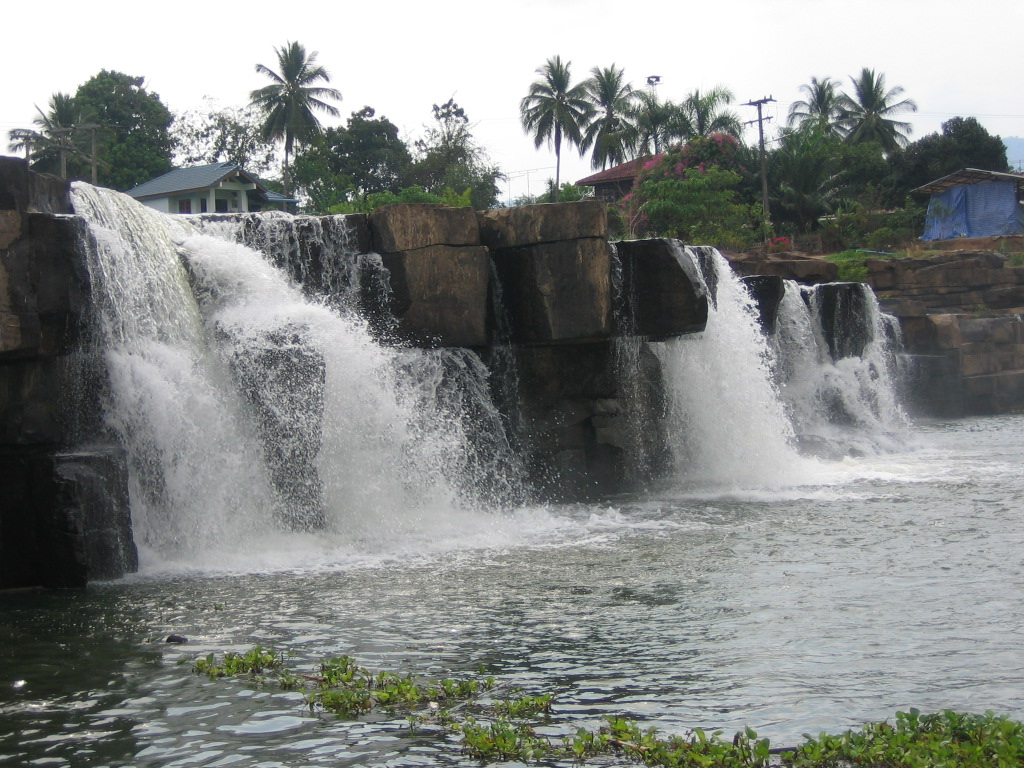
Poi waterfall

- Namtok Kaeng Song - a 10 metres (33 ft) high waterfall.
- Namtok Poi - a waterfall in Khao Krayang Forest park.
- Namtok Kaeng Sopha - a 3-tiered waterfall of the Wang Thong River.
- Namtok Phai Si Thong - a recently discovered 9-tiered waterfall.
- Namtok Kuhlab Daeng - a waterfall
- Lanphwai Kaeng Wang Nam Yen - a creek with hundreds of islets.
- Tham Duan and Tham Dao - caves.
- Tham Phra Rod-Maree - a cave.
- Tham Phra Wang Daeng - a 13 kilometres (8.1 mi) long cave, habitat for millions of bats.
- Tham Sai-Ngarm - a cave.
- Thung Nang Phaya - a savanna, approximately 5 square kilometres (1.9 sq mi).
- Thung Non Son - a grassland with pinery and forest flowers.
- Thung Salaeng Luang - a savanna, about 10 square kilometres (3.9 sq mi).

== Climate ==
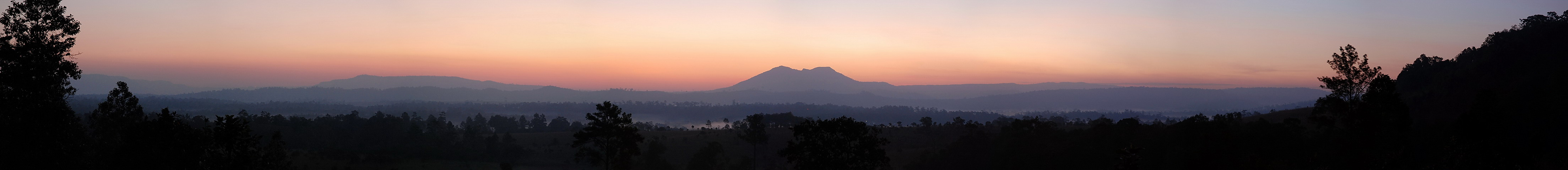
Sunrise at Thung Salaeng Luang N.P.

The average annual temperature is 25 °C (77 °F), although temperatures often reach 30 °C (86 °F) during late spring and early summer. The average annual rainfall is 1,700 millimetres (67 in).

== Malaria ==
Historically, malaria has been a health issue in the park.

== Effects of human presence ==
Communist insurgents as well as hill tribes and other intruders have destroyed some of the park's flora and fauna over the years.

== Location ==
Thung Salaeng Luang National Park in overview PARO 11 (Phitsanulok)

9) Thung Salaeng Luang National Park in overview PARO 11 (Phitsanulok)

	National park			1	Khao Kho
2	Khwae Noi	3	Lam Nam Nan	4	Nam Nao
5	Namtok Chat Trakan	6	Phu Hin Rong Kla	7	Phu Soi Dao
8	Tat Mok	9	Thung Salaeng Luang	10	Ton Sak Yai
	Wildlife sanctuary				
11	Mae Charim	12	Nam Pat	13	Phu Khat
14	Phu Miang-Phu Thong	15	Phu Pha Daeng	16	Tabo-Huai Yai

== See also ==
- List of national parks in Thailand
- DNP - Thung Salaeng Luang National Park
- List of Protected Areas Regional Offices of Thailand
