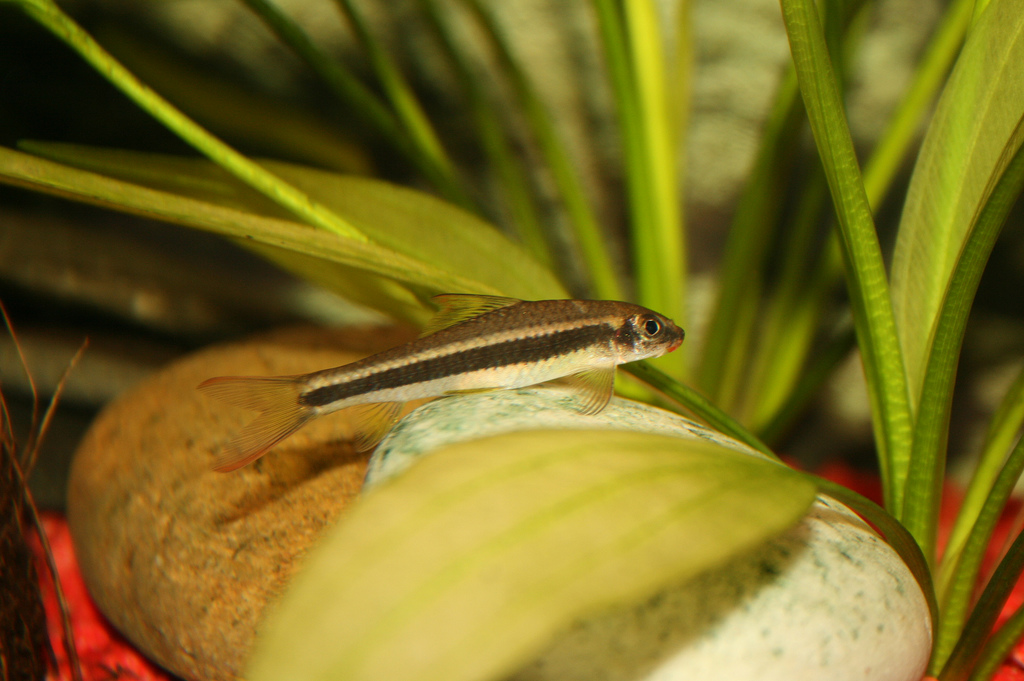

Conservation status
- Least Concern (IUCN 3.1)

Scientific classification
- Kingdom: Animalia
- Phylum: Chordata
- Class: Actinopterygii
- Order: Cypriniformes
- Family: Cyprinidae
- Subfamily: Labeoninae
- Genus: Ceratogarra
- Species: C. cambodgiensis

Binomial name
- Ceratogarra cambodgiensis (Tirant, 1883)

Synonyms
- Cirrhina cambodgiensis Tirant, 1883; Garra cambodgiensis (Tirant, 1883); Garra taeniata Smith, 1931; Garra taeniatops Fowler, 1935; Garra parvifilum Fowler, 1939

= Cambodian logsucker =

Species of fish

The Cambodian logsucker (Ceratogarra cambodgiensis), also known as stonelapping minnow or false Siamese algae eater, is a species of ray-finned fish in the genus Garra. It lives in Southeast Asia.

== Description ==
The Cambodian logsucker has a broad midlateral stripe which has a width roughly equal to two scale rows, it has two black bands on the dorsal fin while the caudal fin may be plain or have dark margins. They are sexually dimorphic with the females having fuller, rounder bellies than the males, the males develop a red inside of the mouth during the spawning season and both sexes develop tubercles on the head and snout when breeding, although these are more obvious in the males. They grow to 15 cm (5.9 in) standard length.

== Distribution ==
The Cambodian logsucker lives in the Mekong of Laos, Cambodia and Thailand, as well as in the Mae Klong, Chao Phraya and the river systems of south eastern Thailand in Phrae, Phitsanulok, Ubon Ratchathani, Trang, Chanthaburi, Chiang Mai, Nakhon Si Thammarat, Kanchanaburi, Nakhon Sawan, Yala, Chiang Rai and Surat Thani provinces of Thailand, in Peninsular Malaysia and in southeastern Mymanmar.

== Habits and ecology ==
The Cambodian logsucker lives in rapidly flowing, small to medium sized streams with rocky beds. In submontane to hill regions, it may also occur in larger or lowland rivers. At the start of the monsoon, it moves into floodplains or paddy fields where it breeds. The fry are cared for by the parents until they are juveniles, at which point they return to the streams. It feeds on periphyton, phytoplankton and some insects. It is sociable in the wild, forming hierarchies in loose shoals. To settle disputes, the males charge each other, flare their fins, become paler in colour and extend their rostral processes.

== Human use ==
The Cambodian logsucker is eaten by some local humans, especially when spawning. It is common in the aquarium trade, but must be hormonally induced to breed in captivity.
