= Gyrinocheilus pennocki =

Conservation status
- Least Concern (IUCN 3.1)

Scientific classification
- Kingdom: Animalia
- Phylum: Chordata
- Class: Actinopterygii
- Order: Cypriniformes
- Family: Gyrinocheilidae
- Genus: Gyrinocheilus
- Species: G. pennocki

Binomial name
- Gyrinocheilus pennocki (Fowler, 1937)

Synonyms
- Gyrinocheilops pennocki Fowler, 1937

Species of fish

Gyrinocheilus pennocki, also known as the spotted algae eater, is a species of freshwater fish endemic to the Mekong basin in Cambodia, Vietnam, Laos, and Thailand. It grows to 28 cm (11 in) SL. It is an important species caught both in commercial and artisanal fisheries.

The fish is named in honor of Charles J. Pennock (1857–1935) of Pennsylvania, an ornithologist to whom Fowler was indebted for acquiring various North American fishes.

Gyrinocheilus pennocki are synonymous to Gyrinocheilus aymonieri but differ in body proportions primarily in head shape.
