= Gilbert Tirant =

French government official and naturalist

Gilbert Tirant (12 June 1848, Lyon – 2 October 1899, Lyon) was a French government official and naturalist.

He studied medicine at Lyon, and following graduation in 1873 he traveled to Tunisia, publishing "Voyage dans la régence de Tunis" (1874; co-author Fleury Rebatel) as a result. Afterwards he was stationed in French Indochina, where he spent many years as an administrator in Cochinchina, Annam and Tonkin. In 1894 he was appointed director of political affairs and protectorates in the Gouvernement général de l’Indochine. In 1898 he returned to France, where he died the following year of malaria.

He supplied the museum in Lyon with a rich collection of birds, fish and other animals from Cochinchina. He also described several new species of fish whose types are kept in the museum.

== Selected works ==
- Les Oiseaux de la Basse-Cochinchine, 1879 – Fish of Lower Conchinchina.
- Mémoire sur les poissons de la rivière de Hué, 1883 – Memoire on fish from the river at Hué.
- Note sur quelques espèces de poissons des montagnes de Samrong-Tong, Cambodge, 1884 – On some species of fish from the mountains of Samraong Tong, Cambodia.
- Les bois odoriférants de la Cochinchine, 1885 – On aromatic wood of Cochinchina.
- Notes sur les reptiles et les batraciens de la Cochinchine, 1885 – On reptiles and amphibians of Cochinchina.
- Notes sur les poissons de la Basse-Cochinchine et du Cambodge, 1885 – Fish of lower Cochinchina and Cambodia.

== Ichthyologic species described by Tirant ==
- Carinotetraodon lorteti (1885)
- Chanodichthys flavipinnis (1883)
- Garra cambodgiensis (1883); Cambodian logsucker.
- Gyrinocheilus aymonieri (1883); Siamese algae-eater
- Puntius aurotaeniatus (1885)
- Rasbora aurotaenia (1885); pale rasbora.
- Rhodeus rheinardti (1883)
- Tetraodon biocellatus (1885); figure 8 puffer.
- Yasuhikotakia morleti (1885); skunk loach.

== See also ==
- Category:Taxa named by Gilbert Tirant
