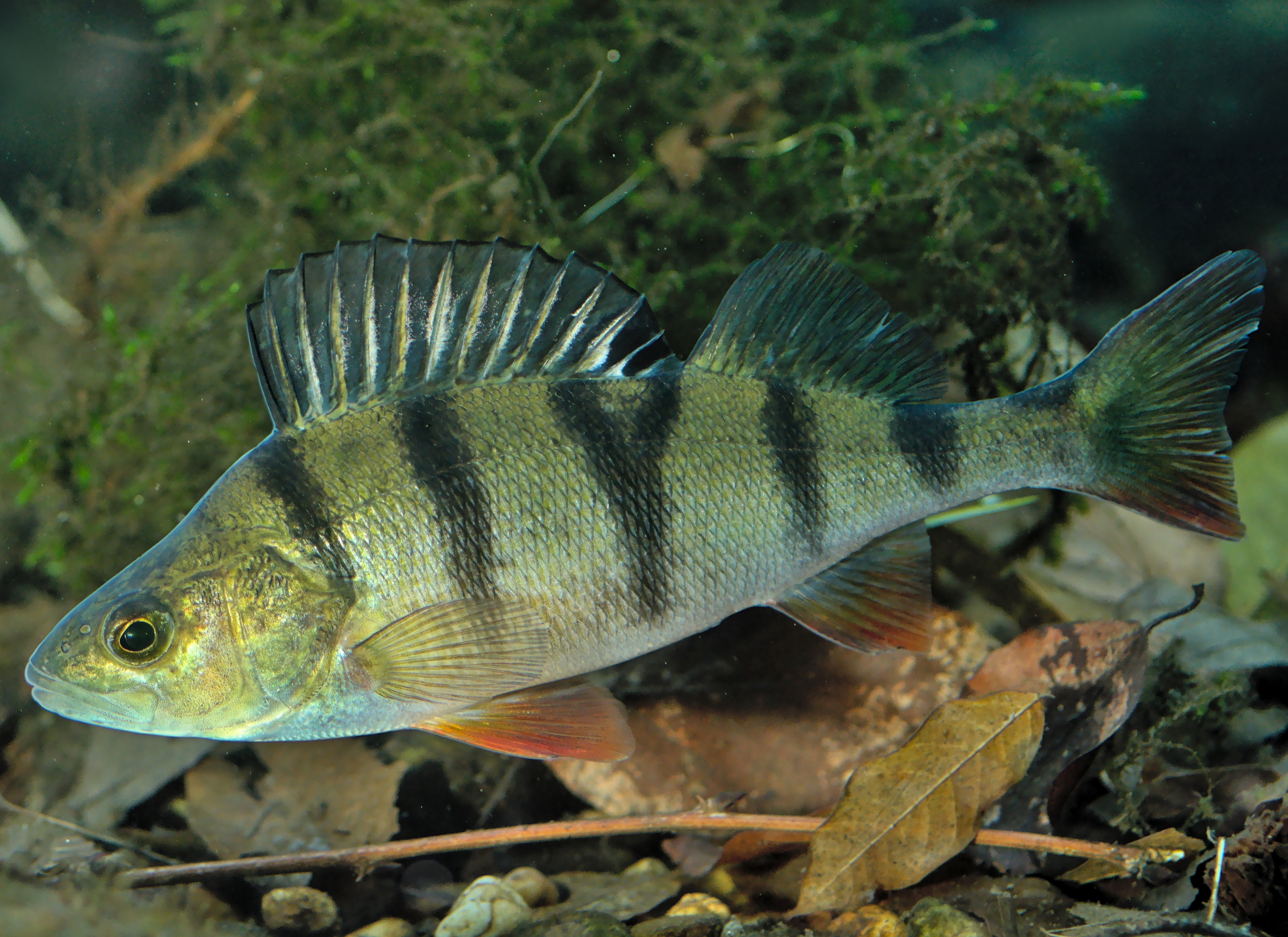
- In Belgium

Conservation status
- Least Concern (IUCN 3.1)

Scientific classification
- Kingdom: Animalia
- Phylum: Chordata
- Class: Actinopterygii
- Division: Teleostei
- Order: Perciformes
- Family: Percidae
- Genus: Perca
- Species: P. fluviatilis

Binomial name
- Perca fluviatilis Linnaeus, 1758
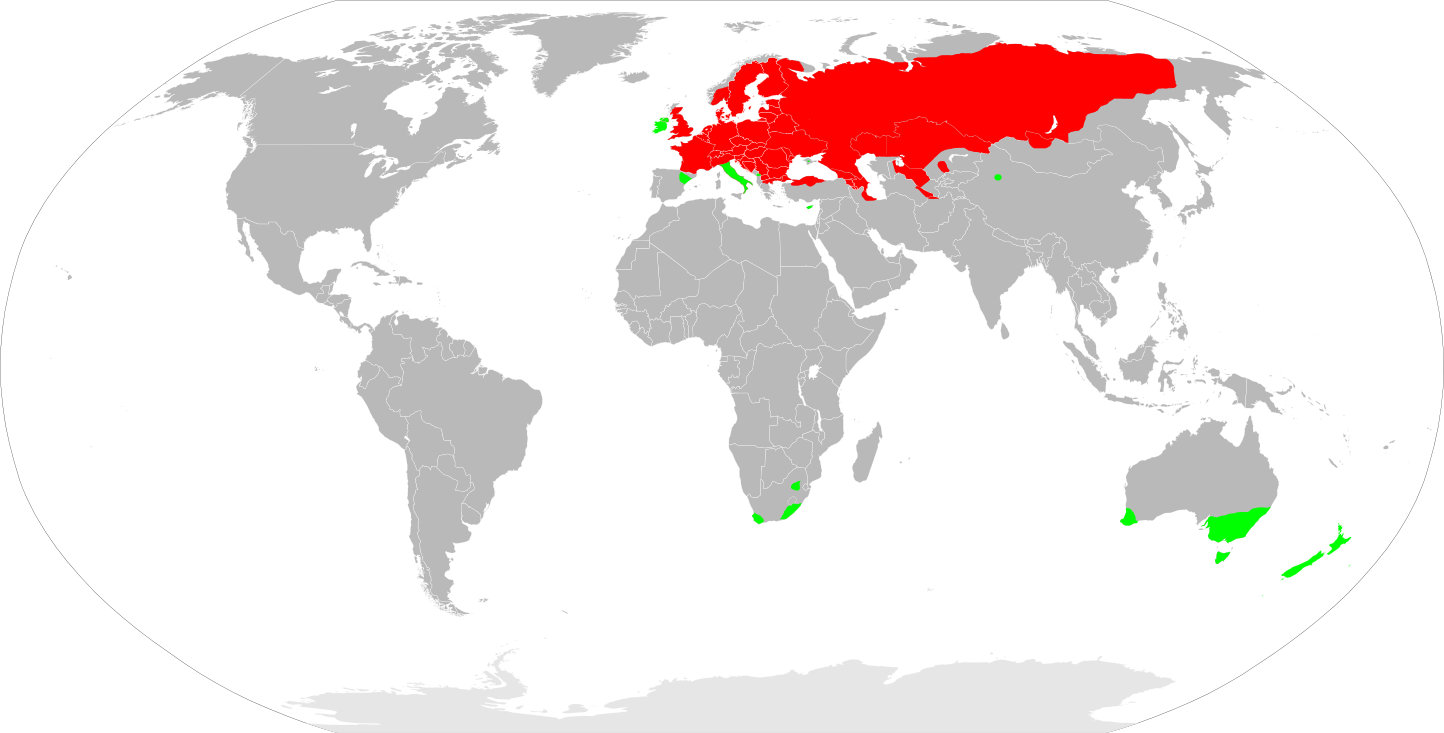
- Distribution: native range introduced range

Synonyms
- Perca vulgaris Schaeffer, 1761; Perca vulgaris Schrank, 1792; Perca italica Cuvier, 1828; Perca vulgaris Fitzinger, 1832; Perca helvetica Gronow, 1854

= European perch =

European perch Temporal range: 3.6-0 Ma Piacenzian–Present

Species of fish

The European perch (Perca fluviatilis), also known as the common perch, redfin perch, big-scaled redfin, English perch, Euro perch, Eurasian perch, Eurasian river perch, Hatch, poor man's rockfish or in Anglophone parts of Europe, simply the perch, is a predatory freshwater fish native to Europe and North Asia. It is the type species of the genus Perca.

The perch is a popular predatory game fish for recreational anglers, and has been widely introduced beyond its native Eurasian habitats into Australia, New Zealand and South Africa. Known locally simply as "redfin", they have caused substantial damage to native fish populations in Australia and have been proclaimed a noxious species in New South Wales.

== Taxonomy ==
The first scientific description of the river perch was made by Peter Artedi in 1730. He defined the basic morphological signs of this species after studying perch from Swedish lakes. Artedi described its features, counting the fins, rays, scales, and vertebrae of the typical perch.

In 1758, Carl Linnaeus named it Perca fluviatilis. His description was based on Artedi's research.

Because of their similar appearance and ability to cross-breed, the yellow perch (Perca flavescens) has sometimes been classified as a subspecies of the European perch, in which case its trinomial name would be Perca fluviatilis flavescens.

== Distribution and habitat ==
The range of the European perch covers fresh water basins all over Europe, excluding the Iberian Peninsula. Their range is known to reach the Kolyma River in Siberia to the east. It is also common in some of the brackish waters of the Baltic Sea.

The European perch lives in slow-flowing rivers, deep lakes and ponds. It tends to avoid cold or fast-flowing waters but some specimens penetrate waters of these type, although they do not breed in this habitat. They are most abundant in relatively shallow lakes and lakes with deep light penetration, and less abundant in deep lakes and those with low light penetration.

=== Introduction outside Europe ===
European perch has been widely introduced, with reported adverse ecological impact after introduction. In Australia, the species is implicated in the decline of the now-endangered native fish, the Macquarie perch.

== Description ==
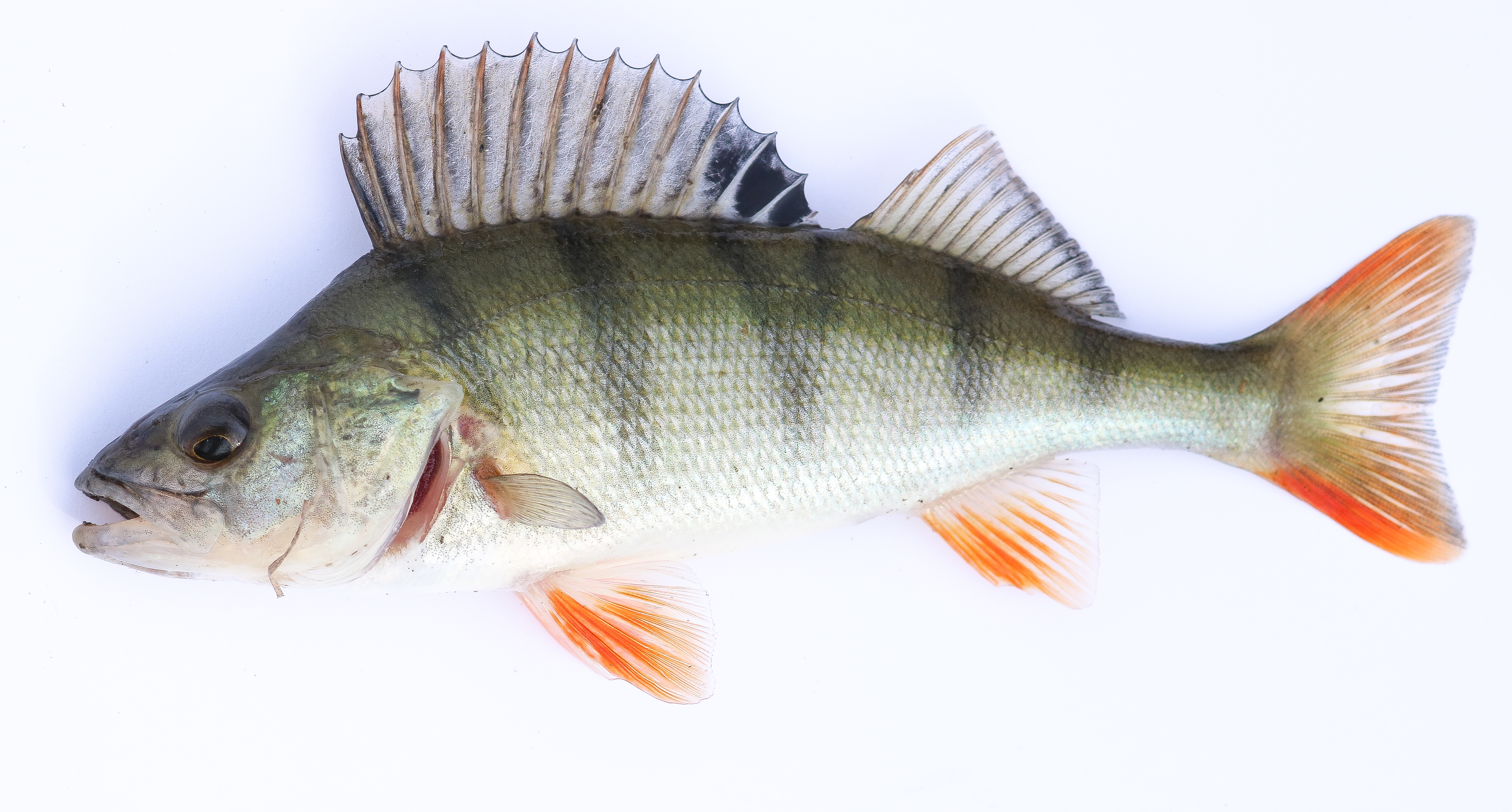
With fins fully spread

European perch are greenish with red pelvic, anal and caudal fins. They have five to eight dark vertical bars on their sides. When the perch grows larger, a hump grows between its head and dorsal fin.

European perch can vary greatly in size between bodies of water. They can live for up to 22 years, and older perch are often much larger than average; the maximum recorded length is 60 cm (24 in). The British record is 2.806 kg (6 lb 3.0 oz), but they grow larger in mainland Europe than in Britain. As of May 2016, the official all tackle world record recognised by the International Game Fish Association (IGFA) stands at 2.9 kg (6 lb 6 oz) for a Finnish fish caught September 4, 2010. In January 2010 a perch with a weight of 3.75 kg (8 lb 4 oz) and a length of 58 cm (23 in) was caught in the river Meuse, Netherlands. Due to the low salinity levels of the Baltic Sea, especially around the Finnish archipelago and Bothnian Sea, many freshwater fish live and thrive there. Perch especially are in abundance and grow to a considerable size due to the diet of Baltic herring.

== Behaviour and reproduction ==
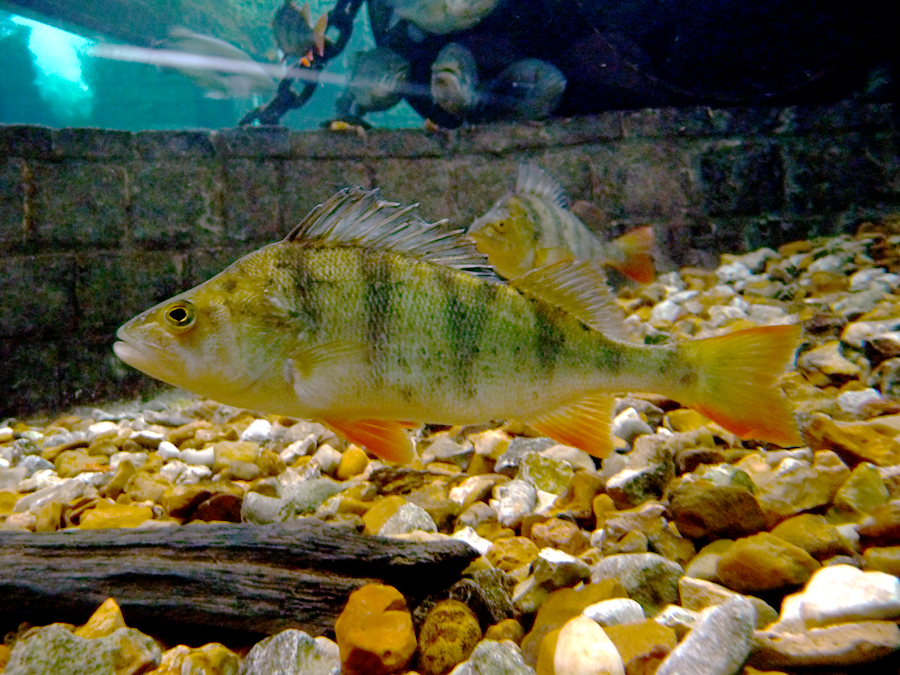
European perch

The European perch is carnivorous, with juveniles feeding on zooplankton, bottom invertebrate fauna and other perch fry, while adults feed on both invertebrates and fish, mainly sticklebacks, perch, roach and minnows. Perch start eating other fish when they become fingerlings at a size of around 120 mm (4.7 in).

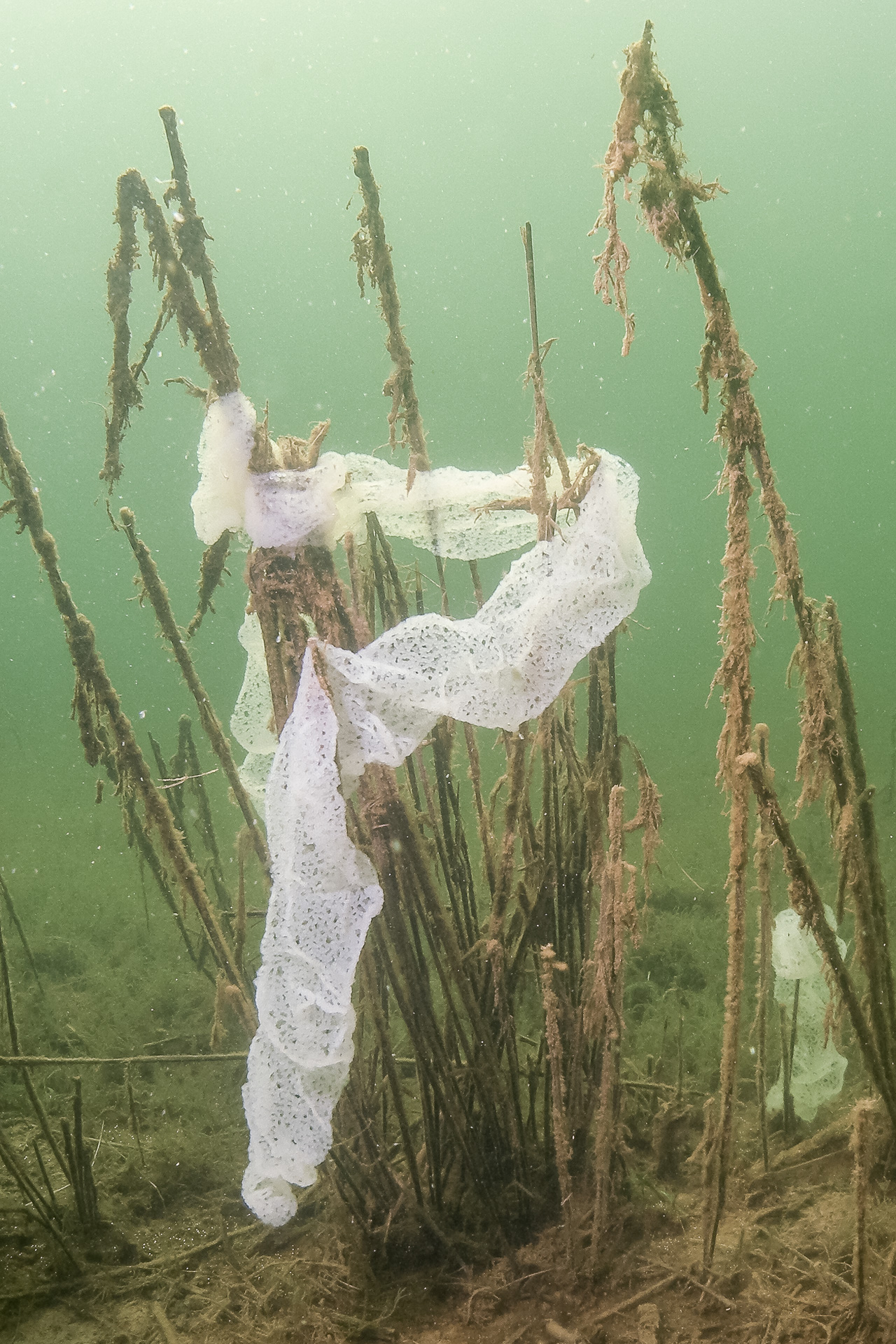
Ribbon of eggs on aquatic vegetation

Male perch become sexually mature at between one and two years of age, females between two and four. In the Northern Hemisphere they spawn between February and July. Males reach spawning areas ahead of females, and court mates by chasing through underwater vegetation. During reproduction, the female lays a white ribbon of eggs up to one meter long, which is deposited on water plants or on the branches of trees or shrubs immersed in the water. There has been speculation, but only anecdotal evidence, that eggs stick to the legs of wading birds and are then transferred to other waters.

The eggs hatch after a period of 8 to 16 days. The larvae are 5 millimetres (0.20 in) long on hatching, and live in open water where they feed on plankton. Juveniles migrate to areas nearer the shore and bottom during their first summer.

=== Diseases and parasites ===
Cucullanus elegans is a species of parasitic nematode. It is an endoparasite of the European perch. Juvenile perch are commonly infected by Camallanus lacustris (Nematoda), Proteocephalus percae, Bothriocephalus claviceps, Glanitaenia osculata, Triaenophorus nodulosus (all Cestoda) and Acanthocephalus lucii (Acanthocephala).

== Predators ==
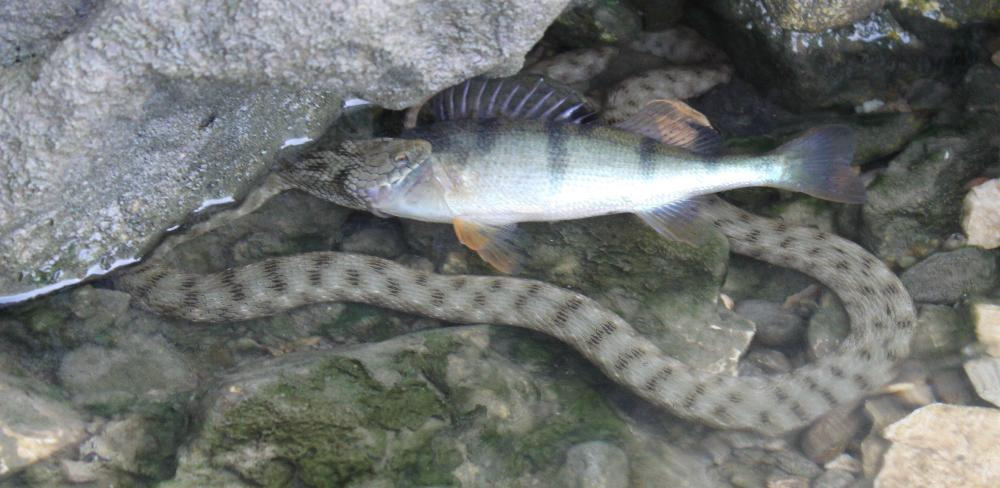
Being eaten by a dice snake.

The European perch is a frequent prey of many fish-eating predators such as the Western osprey (Pandion haliaetus), great cormorant (Phalacrocorax carbo) and common kingfisher (Alcedo atthis), and it is an important item in the diet of the globally threatened Dalmatian pelican (Pelecanus crispus). Other non-avian predators include the northern pike (Esox lucius) and the Eurasian otter (Lutra lutra).

== Relationship with humans ==
=== Fishing ===
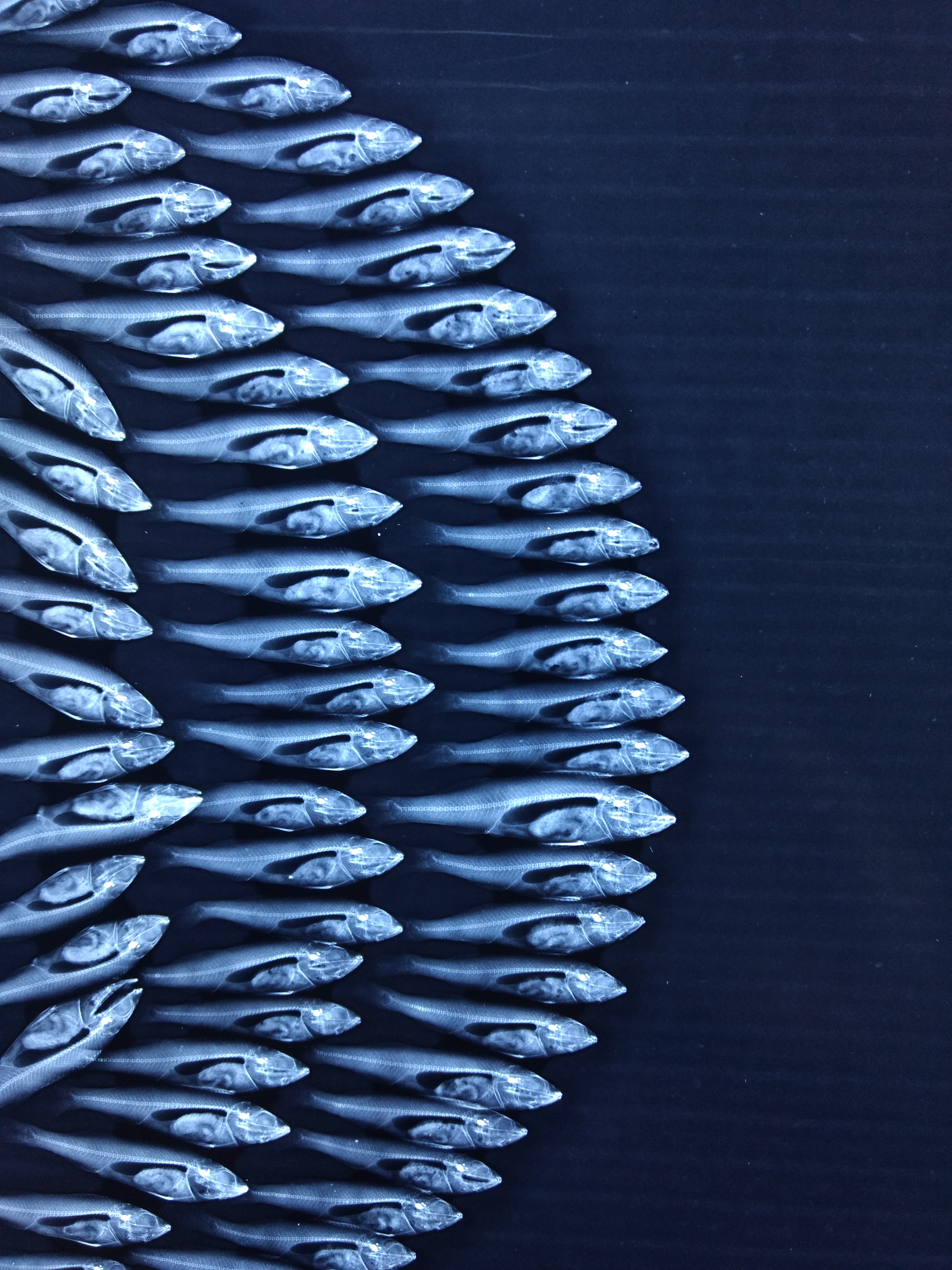
Low-energy X-rays used for quality control of perch fingerlings at a Swiss fish farm

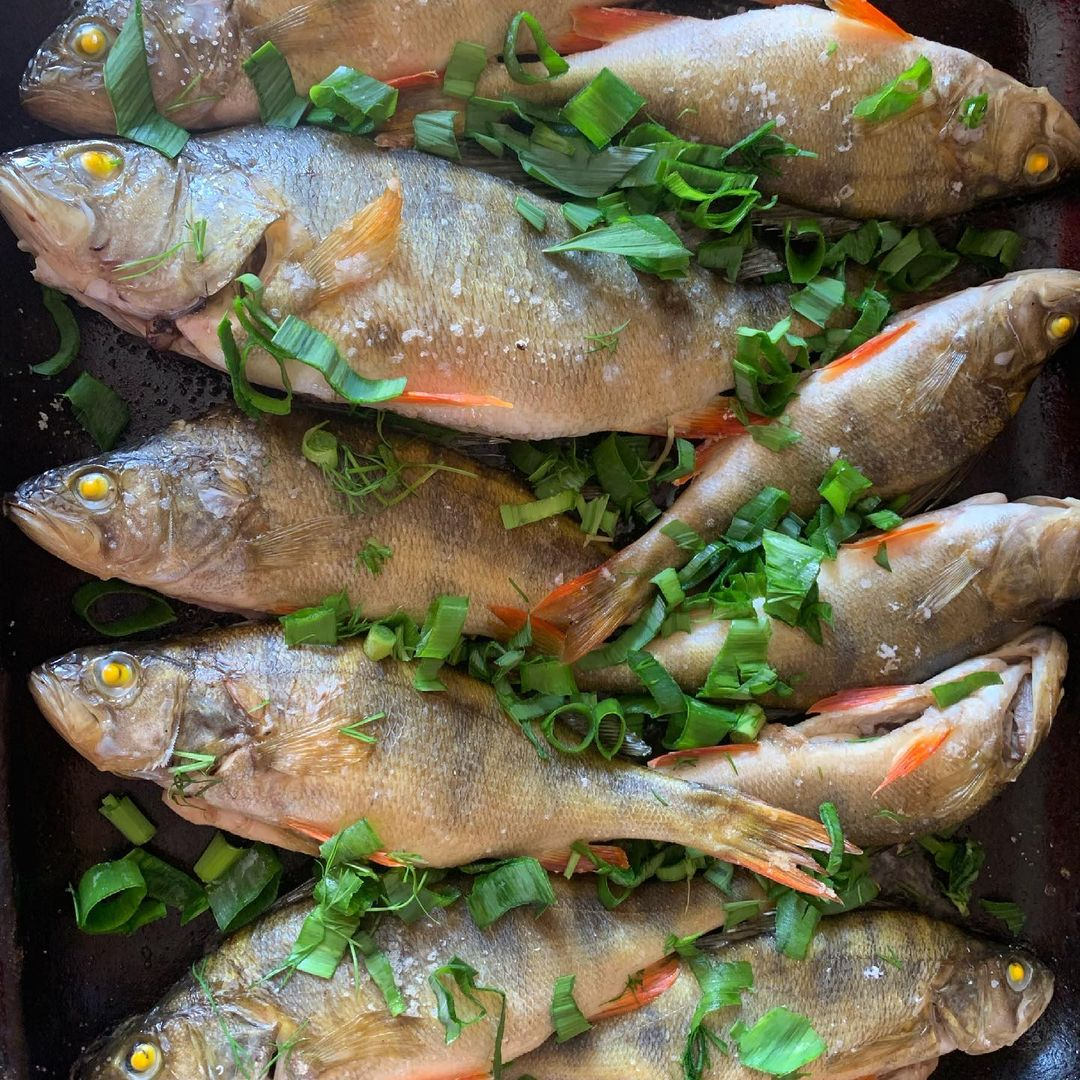
Perch dish

European perch is fished for food and as game. Its flesh is described as good eating, with a white, firm, flaky texture and well flavoured. According to FAO statistics, 28,920 tonnes were caught in 2013. Largest perch fishing countries were Russia, (15,242 tonnes), Finland (7,666 tonnes), Estonia (2,144 t), Poland (1,121 t) and Kazakhstan (1,103 t).

Baits for perch include baitfishes (e.g. minnows, goldfish), weather loaches, pieces of raw squid or pieces of raw fish (mackerel, bluey, jack mackerel, sardine), or brandling, red, marsh, and lob worms, maggots, shrimp (Caridina, Neocaridina, Palaemon, Macrobrachium) and peeled crayfish tails. The tackles needed are fine but strong.

Artificial lures are also effective, particularly for medium-sized perch. It is possible to fly fish for perch using artificial flies tied for the purpose. Often, the flies required are "streamers" or bait-fish imitations and use flash, colour and movement to entice a take from the perch.

=== Culinary use ===
The flesh is firm, mild in flavor, and comparable to that of other high-quality white fish. It is widely consumed in Europe and is considered suitable for frying, grilling, and other preparations.

=== Perch in culture ===
Coat of arms of Bad Buchau

The European perch is Finland's national fish.

It is also pictured in emblems of several European towns and municipalities, such as Bad Buchau, Gröningen and Schönberg, Plön.

The item icon for fish in the 2020 factory simulation game Factorio is meant to represent a European perch. The artist, V453000, based it on the favourite plushie of his daughter.

== See also ==
- Nanbanzuke
- Ceratophyllum demersum
- Myriophyllum spicatum
