= Triaenophorus =

Triaenophorus may refer to:

- Triaenophorus (flatworm), a genus of flatworms in the family Triaenophoridae
- Triaenophorus, a genus of fishes in the family Oxudercidae; synonym of Tridentiger
