= Eubothrium =

Scientific classification
- Kingdom: Animalia
- Phylum: Platyhelminthes
- Class: Cestoda
- Order: Bothriocephalidea
- Family: Triaenophoridae
- Genus: Eubothrium; Nybelin, 1922

Synonyms
- Blanchardella Moniez, 1895; Leuckartia Moniez, 1879

Genus of flatworms

Eubothrium is a genus of flatworms belonging to the family Triaenophoridae.

The species of this genus are found in Europe and Northern America.

Species:

- Eubothrium acipenserinum (Cholodkovsky, 1918) Dogiel & Bychowsky, 1939
- Eubothrium arcticum Nybelin, 1922
- Eubothrium crassum (Bloch, 1779) Nybelin, 1922
- Eubothrium fragile (Rudolphi, 1802) Nybelin, 1922
- Eubothrium parvum Nybelin, 1922
- Eubothrium rugosum (Batsch, 1786) Nybelin, 1922
- Eubothrium salvelini (Schrank, 1790) Nybelin, 1922
- Eubothrium tulipai Ching & Andersen, 1983
- Eubothrium vittevitellatus Mamaev, 1968
