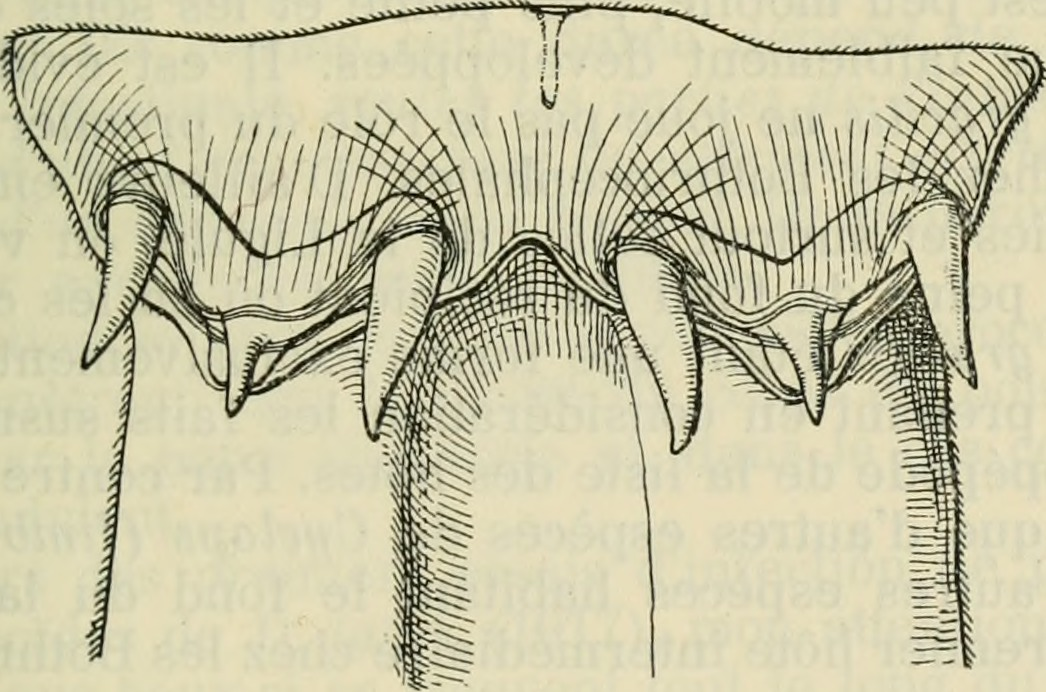
- Head of Triaenophorus nodulosus

Scientific classification
- Kingdom: Animalia
- Phylum: Platyhelminthes
- Class: Cestoda
- Order: Bothriocephalidea
- Family: Triaenophoridae
- Genus: Triaenophorus
- Species: T. nodulosus

Binomial name
- Triaenophorus nodulosus (Pallas, 1781) Rudolphi, 1793

Synonyms
- Taenia nodulosa Pallas, 1781

= Triaenophorus nodulosus =

Species of tapeworm

Triaenophorus nodulosus, the pike tapeworm, is a species of parasitic cestode (tapeworm) in the family Triaenophoridae. It is known to infect the northern pike, as well as other piscivorous fish, being found in the intestine of its host. It has been found in North America, Europe and England.

== Description ==
Adult specimens of Triaenophorus nodulosus have been seen to range from 70 to 270 mm (2.8 to 10.6 in) long. When having a developed egg in the uterus, their maximum width is 1.5 to 4.0 mm (0.059 to 0.157 in). There are four hooks on the scolex, with an angled plate about 112 to 120 μm (0.0044 to 0.0047 in) wide and 20 to 30 μm (0.00079 to 0.00118 in) deep. Its cirrus sac is 739 to 968 μm (0.0291 to 0.0381 in) long.

The eggs of the species are white, but turn brown around 45 minutes after being placed in water. They are ovoid; they are about 58 to 67 μm (0.0023 to 0.0026 in) long and 38 to 44 μm (0.0015 to 0.0017 in) in diameter. Oncospheres can be made out inside ripe eggs. Coracidia are around the same size of the egg, and are ovoid as well. They are about 67 to 85 μm (0.0026 to 0.0033 in) long and 58 to 80 μm (0.0023 to 0.0031 in) wide.

== Hosts ==
Triaenophorus nodulosus has been found in a variety of fish, such as the northern pike, the coho salmon, the sockeye salmon, the Great Lakes muskellunge, and the walleye, as well as other fish from the United States and Canada. It uses piscivorous fish as definitive hosts, and uses smaller, preyed-upon fish or other marine organisms, such as copepods in the genus Cyclops, as intermediate hosts. When infecting its hosts, it embeds itself in the intestines or viscera.
