= Echinophallidae =

Scientific classification
- Kingdom: Animalia
- Phylum: Platyhelminthes
- Class: Cestoda
- Order: Bothriocephalidea
- Family: Echinophallidae

Synonyms
- Parabothriocephalidae

Family of flatworms

Echinophallidae is a family of flatworms belonging to the order Bothriocephalidea.

== Genera ==
Genera:

- Bothriocotyle Ariola, 1900
- Dactylobothrium Srivastav, Khare & Jadhav, 2006
- Echinophallus Schumacher, 1914
- Mesoechinophallus Kuchta, Scholz & Bray, 2008
- Neobothriocephalus Mateo & Bullock, 1966
- Parabothriocephaloides Yamaguti, 1934
- Parabothriocephalus Yamaguti, 1934
- Paraechinophallus Protasova, 1975
- Pseudamphicotyla Yamaguti, 1959
