= Triaenophorus (flatworm) =

Scientific classification
- Kingdom: Animalia
- Phylum: Platyhelminthes
- Class: Cestoda
- Order: Bothriocephalidea
- Family: Triaenophoridae
- Genus: Triaenophorus; Rudolphi, 1793

Synonyms
- Amblycephalus Zeder, 1803; Rhitelminthus Chiaje, 1825; Rhitis Blainville, 1824; Rhytelminthus Zeder, 1800; Rhytelmis Rafinesque, 1815; Rhythelminthus Rudolphi, 1819; Rhythis Blainville, 1824; Rhytis Zeder, 1803; Rytelminthus Rudolphi, 1801; Rythis Gistl, 1848; Trianophorus Sonsino, 1891; Tricupisdaria Nordmann, 1840; Tricuspidaria Rudolphi, 1793; Tricuspidarix Perrier, 1878; Tricuspisdaria Nordmann, 1840; Trienoforus Polonio, 1860; Trioenophorus Mégnin, 1881

Genus of flatworms

Triaenophorus is a genus of flatworms belonging to the family Triaenophoridae.

The species of this genus are found in Europe and Northern America.

Species:

- Triaenophorus crassus Forel, 1868
- Triaenophorus lucii (Müller, 1776)
- Triaenophorus meridionalis Kuperman, 1968
- Triaenophorus nodulosus (Pallas, 1781) Rudolphi, 1793
- Triaenophorus robustus Olsson, 1893
- Triaenophorus stizostedionis Miller, 1945
