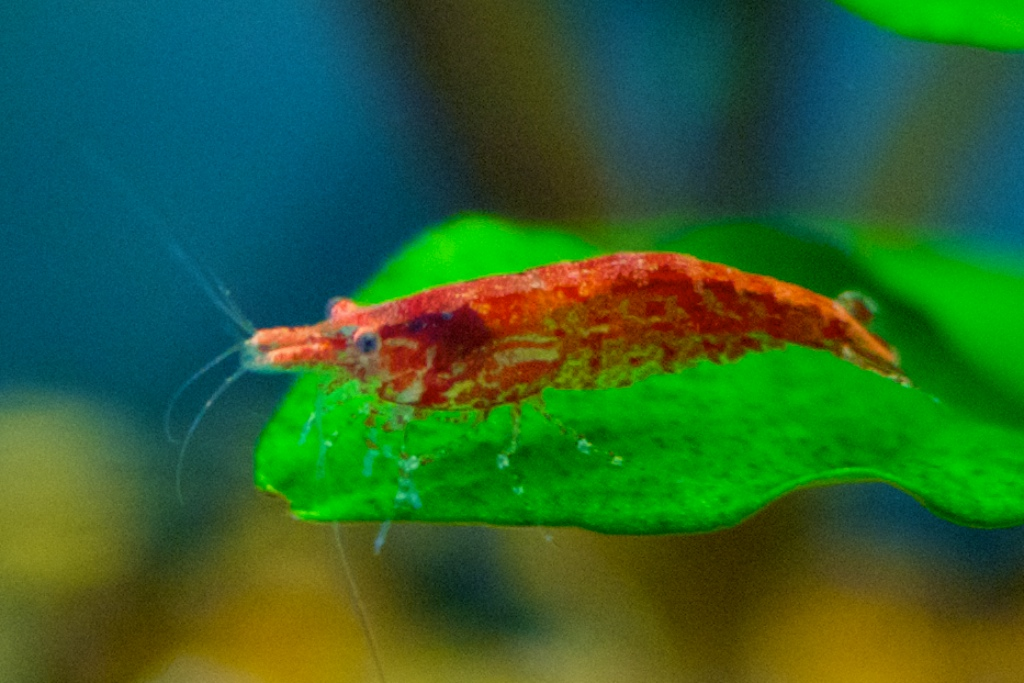
- A cherry shrimp

Scientific classification
- Kingdom: Animalia
- Phylum: Arthropoda
- Clade: Pancrustacea
- Class: Malacostraca
- Order: Decapoda
- Suborder: Pleocyemata
- Infraorder: Caridea
- Family: Atyidae
- Genus: Neocaridina
- Species: N. davidi

Binomial name
- Neocaridina davidi (Bouvier, 1904)

Synonyms
- Caridina davidi Bouvier, 1904; Caridina denticulata sinensis Kemp, 1918; Neocaridina denticulata davidi (Bouvier, 1904); Neocaridina denticulata sinensis (Kemp, 1918); Neocaridina heteropoda Liang, 2002; Neocaridina heteropoda heteropoda Liang, 2002

= Neocaridina davidi =

Species of crustacean

Neocaridina davidi, also known as the cherry shrimp, is a freshwater shrimp native to Taiwan, east of China, the Korean Peninsula, and Vietnam, that is sold globally in the aquatic pet trade. They are omnivores, and their natural habitat in these regions include inland water bodies such as lakes, ponds, rivers, and streams. N. davidi is also able to tolerate a wide range of environmental conditions, and as a result of this is also becoming invasive in thermally polluted waterways of Japan, the United States, Poland, and Germany. It is thought that the release of captive shrimp has led to their presence in these environments. Their natural coloration, or wild type, is a mottled brown, but N. davidi has been selectively bred to produce a diverse array of color morphs including red, orange, yellow, green, blue, violet, white, clear, and more. The popularity of the red morph has led to N. davidi also being known as "cherry shrimp". N. davidi do not have a distinct larval stage, reach maturity in 30 days, and may live 1–2 years. At maturity, the shrimp are approximately 3–4 cm in length.

== Classification ==
Neocaridina davidi was first identified and described by E-L Bouvier in 1904 but mislabeled under the genus Caridina, within the Atyidae family. The genus Caridina was recognized in 1837, and the genus Neocaridina was not separated from Caridina until 1938. The name of these shrimp has undergone several revisions before being recognized as N. davidi and has formerly been classified as Neocaridina denticulata sinensis (Kemp, 1918), Neocaridina heteropoda heteropoda (Liang, 2002), Neocaridina heteropoda (Liang, 2002), Caridina davidi, and Neocaridina zhangjiajiensis. These other titles have since been rejected, and Neocaridina zhangjiajiensis is now recognized as its own separate species.

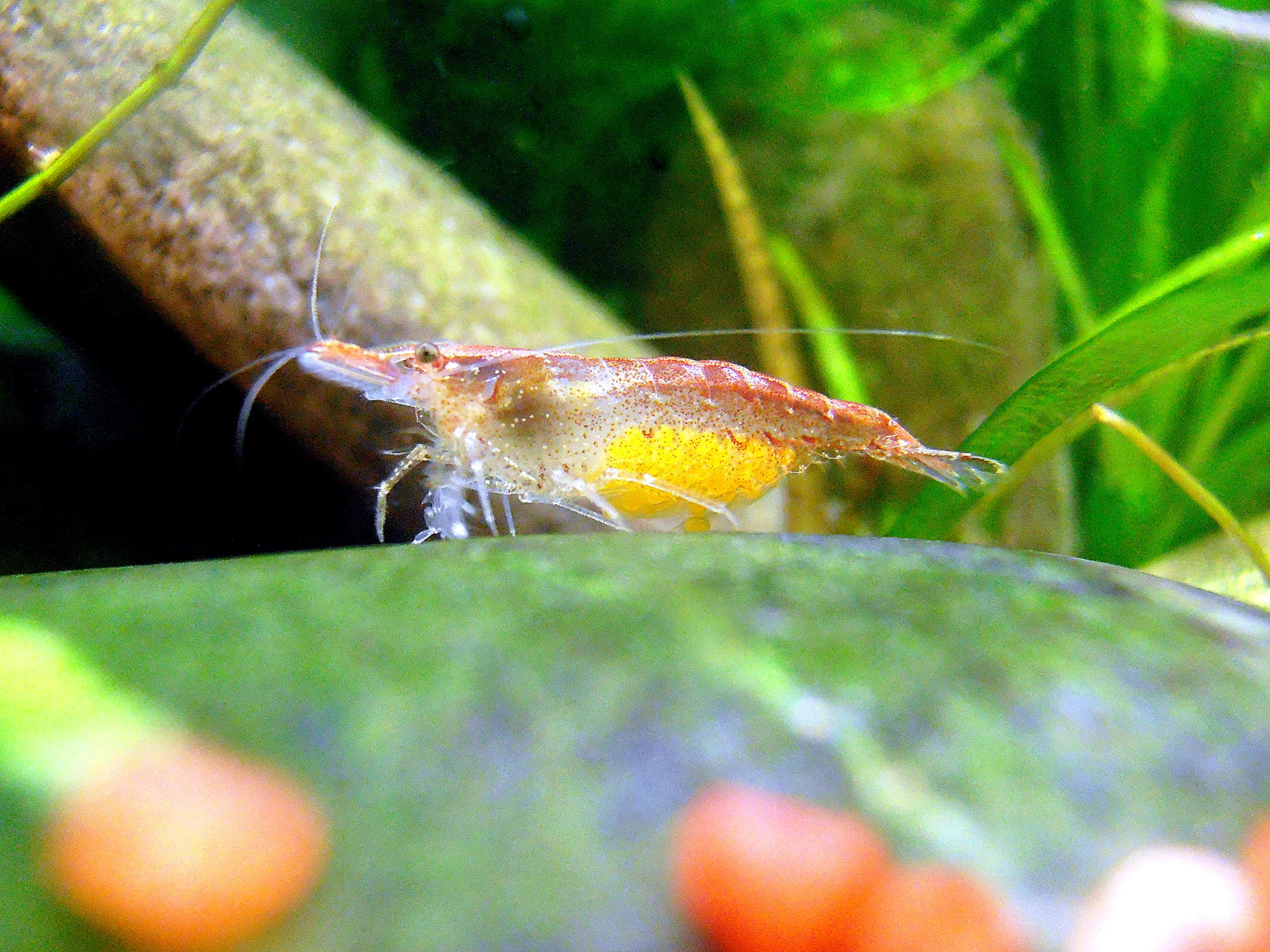
Female with eggs

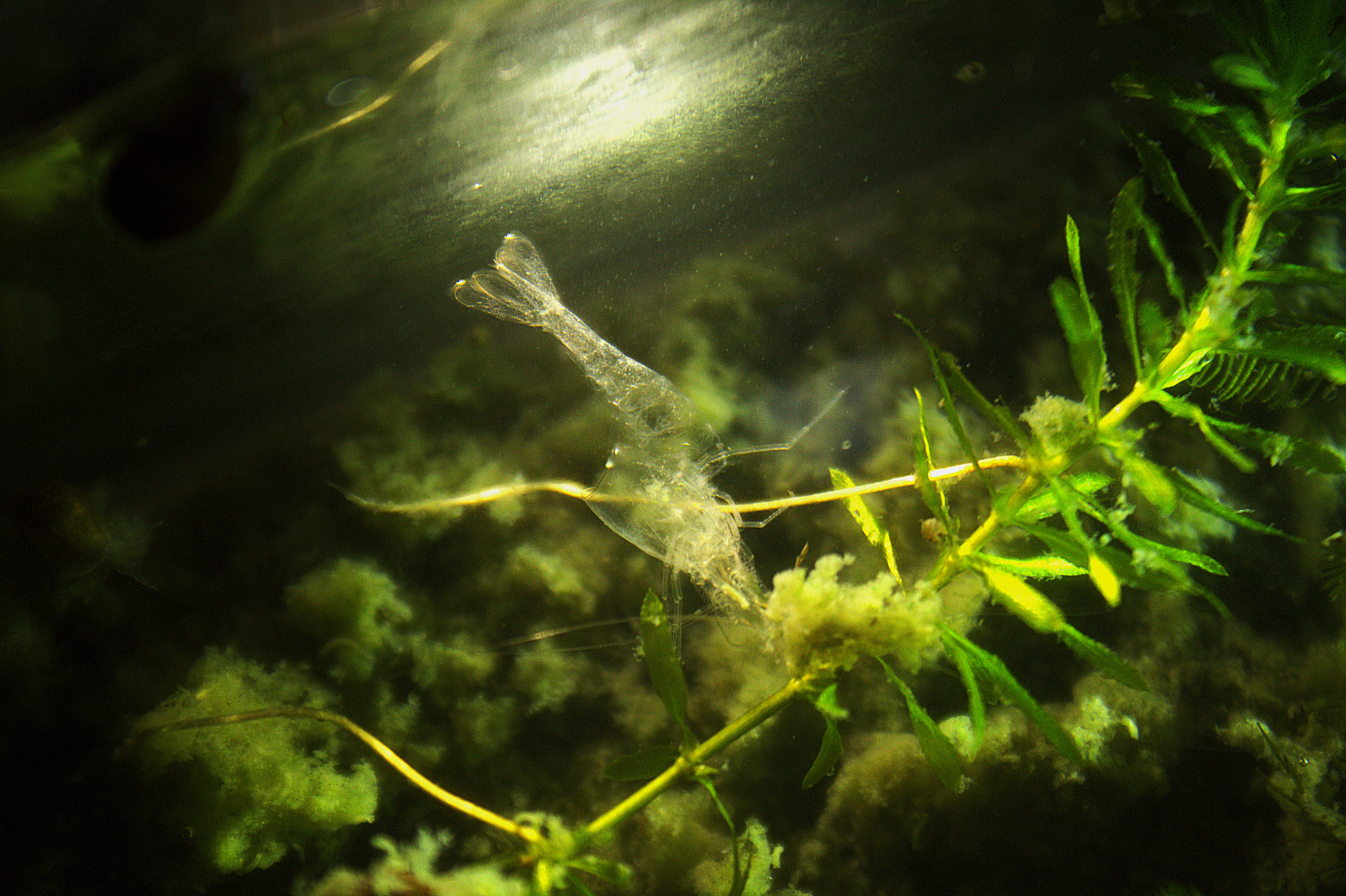
Discarded molt of freshwater shrimp

== Behavior ==
N. davidi are non-aggressive shrimp that are timid and spend the majority of their time scavenging for food in their surroundings. Gravid females can be seen circulating water over the eggs with their pleopods (swimming legs) to ensure the health of their offspring, but they will abandon their eggs if stressed.

N. davidi molt periodically as they grow, and will consume their exoskeletons to recover the nutrients they contain, so molts should not be removed. Juvenile shrimp will molt more often than adult shrimp. These exoskeletons are the translucent outer shell of the shrimp, but also may have a whitish coloration.

== Diet ==
N. davidi feed using their clawlike appendages at the ends of their first two pairs of legs, known as chelae, to grab their food. They are omnivores and feed on biofilms, algae, and detritus; they do not eat vascular plants. N. davidi also consume their molted exoskeletons.

== Anatomy and Sexing ==
Neocaridina davidi are a sexually dimorphic species. Males are typically smaller and less colorful than females. Females are typically larger, have wider tails for carrying eggs, and display a richer, more opaque coloration. On the upper section of the female's body, on the "shoulder", the developing eggs on the ovaries may be seen in more transparent shrimp morphs. The shape of the ovaries drapes across both sides of the shrimp, giving rise to the nickname "saddle". The presence of a "saddle" indicates a female that is likely ready to mate.

== Breeding ==
N. davidi shrimp reach sexual maturity at approximately two months of age. Breeding only requires a sexed pair of shrimp, stable water parameters, and a food source. Eggs may be observed developing in the female's ovaries as a green or yellow triangular "saddle" marking on her back. When she is ready to lay the eggs, which occurs after molting, she releases pheromones into the water to signal her availability to males. The male shrimp in the tank will often become agitated, swimming very actively about as they search for the source of the pheromones. After a brief mating process, during which the male deposits sperm onto the female's body, the female lays her eggs and affixes them to her swimmerettes, or pleopods. The eggs are not fertilized within the female; they are fertilized as they pass from the ovaries to the outside of the body. Therefore, it is certain that any shrimp carrying eggs has mated.

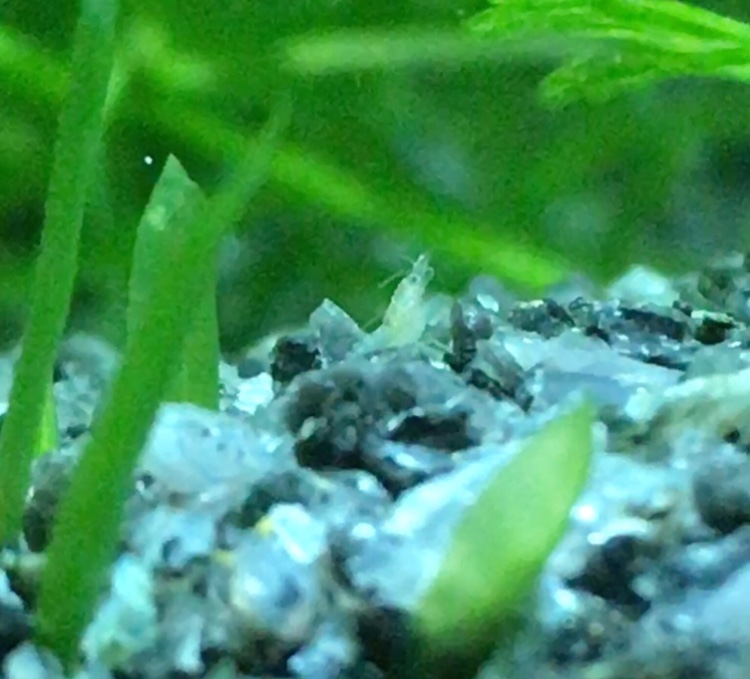
A two day-old Neocaridina davidi (red morph) shrimp (roughly 1 mm (0.039 in) in length)

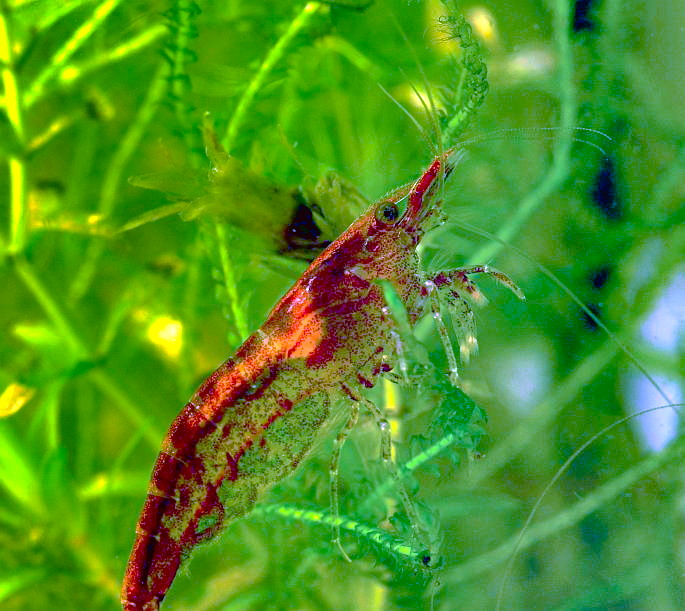
Cherry shrimp

Females produce between 20–30 eggs at a time, which take 2–3 weeks to hatch. However, they may abandon their eggs if stressed or if it is their first time carrying eggs. The eggs are green or yellow, depending on the color of the saddle. They turn darker and darker until the young shrimp hatch after about three weeks. As the eggs near the end stages of growth, tiny dark eye spots of the developing shrimp within can be observed. When the young hatch, they are tiny (roughly 1mm) copies of the adults, as N. davidi does not have a larval stage.

== Species Population ==
The population of Neocaradina davidi is not exactly known due to their high breeding rate, they are thought to be in the billions worldwide. Most of their population is in the aquarium hobby and introduced areas because their native area is quite small.

== Varieties ==
While there is variance in the greenish-brown wild type coloration of N. davidi, they have been selectively bred to display a wide range of colors. It is thought that the variation of the wild type coloration serves as camouflage to protect against predation and to display an individual's health for mate attraction. There is limited public information about the heritability and inheritance patterns, expression, and polymorphism of color traits in the selective breeding of N. davidi.

N. davidi is semi-translucent, and their appearances are the result of "blood" ("flesh", muscles etc.) coloration and "skin" (the chitin of the shell) coloration. It is thought that the carotenoids in the food that shrimp consume provide pigmentation for their chromatophores.

Some of their coloration expressed in the exoskeleton of N. davidi may result from a specific mixture of the products produced by chromatophores; xanthophores (yellow/orange), erythrophores (red/orange), iridophores (blue), leucophores (white), and melanophores (black/brown). Melanophores produce melanin, xanthaphoeres and erythrophores produce pteridine and carotenoids, and iridophores and leucophores contain purines.

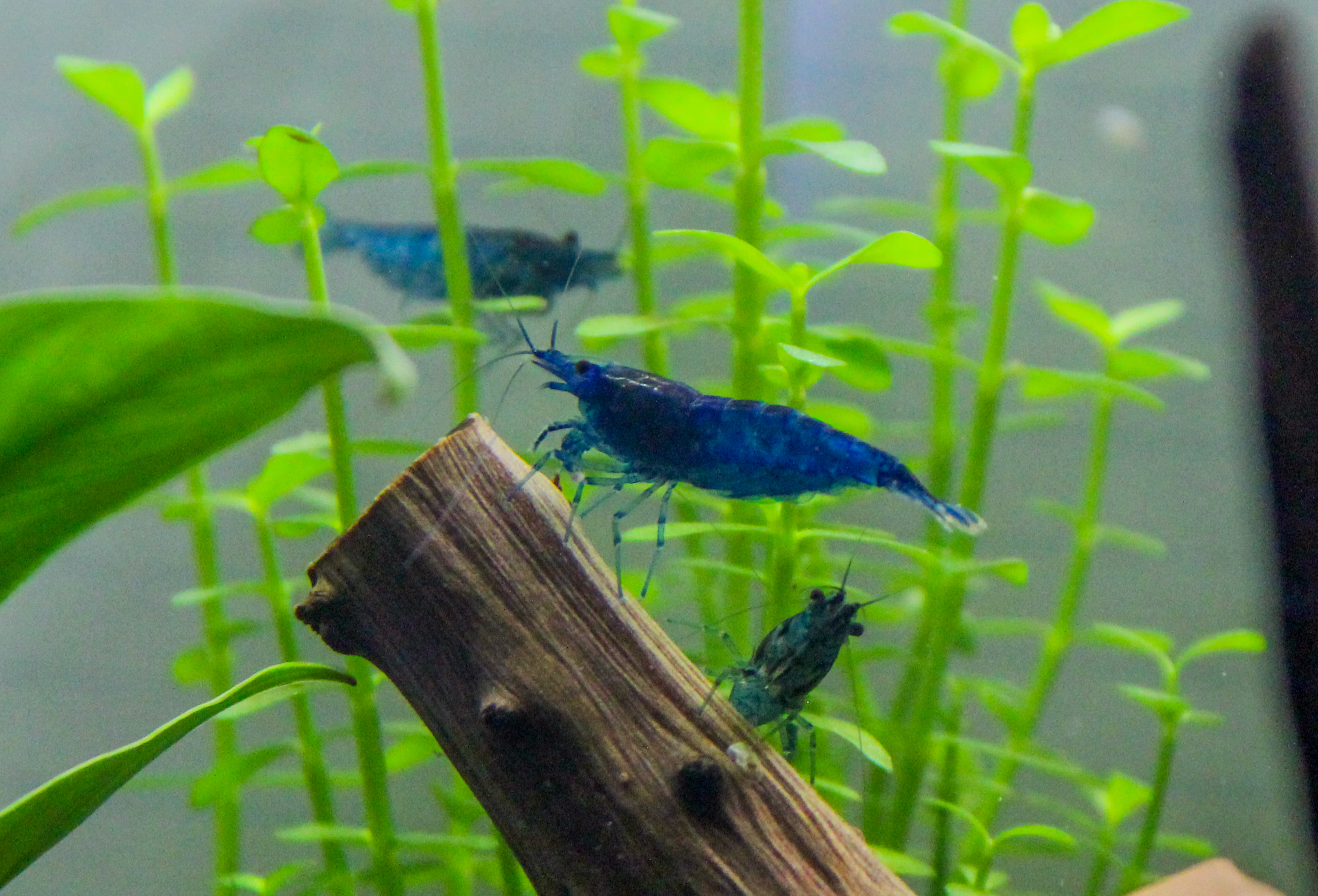
Blue-morph Neocaridina davidi shrimp

- Red – Red is the most frequently sold morph. The presence of erythrophores causes the red color of the shrimp.
- Yellow – The yellow color of the shrimp is caused by the presence of xanthophores.
- Blue – Blue shrimp are caused by the presence of iridophores which reflect blue light, or absence of melanophores combined with blue/blueish flesh.
- Green – Green shrimp is caused by the mixture of iridophores (that reflect blue light) and xanthophores.
- Violet – Violet shrimp is caused by the mixture of iridophores (that reflect blue light) and erythrophores.
- Chocolate – Melanophores that are a dark brown shade are present in this shrimp, though erythrophores or xanthophores can contribute to the brown or chocolate color of the shrimp.
- Black – Black melanophores are present in this shrimp, or brown melanophores combined with blue/blueish flesh.
- White – White shrimp are mainly caused by the absence of melanophores.
- "Ghost" – "Ghost" shrimp do not express any pigment at all and appear transparent.
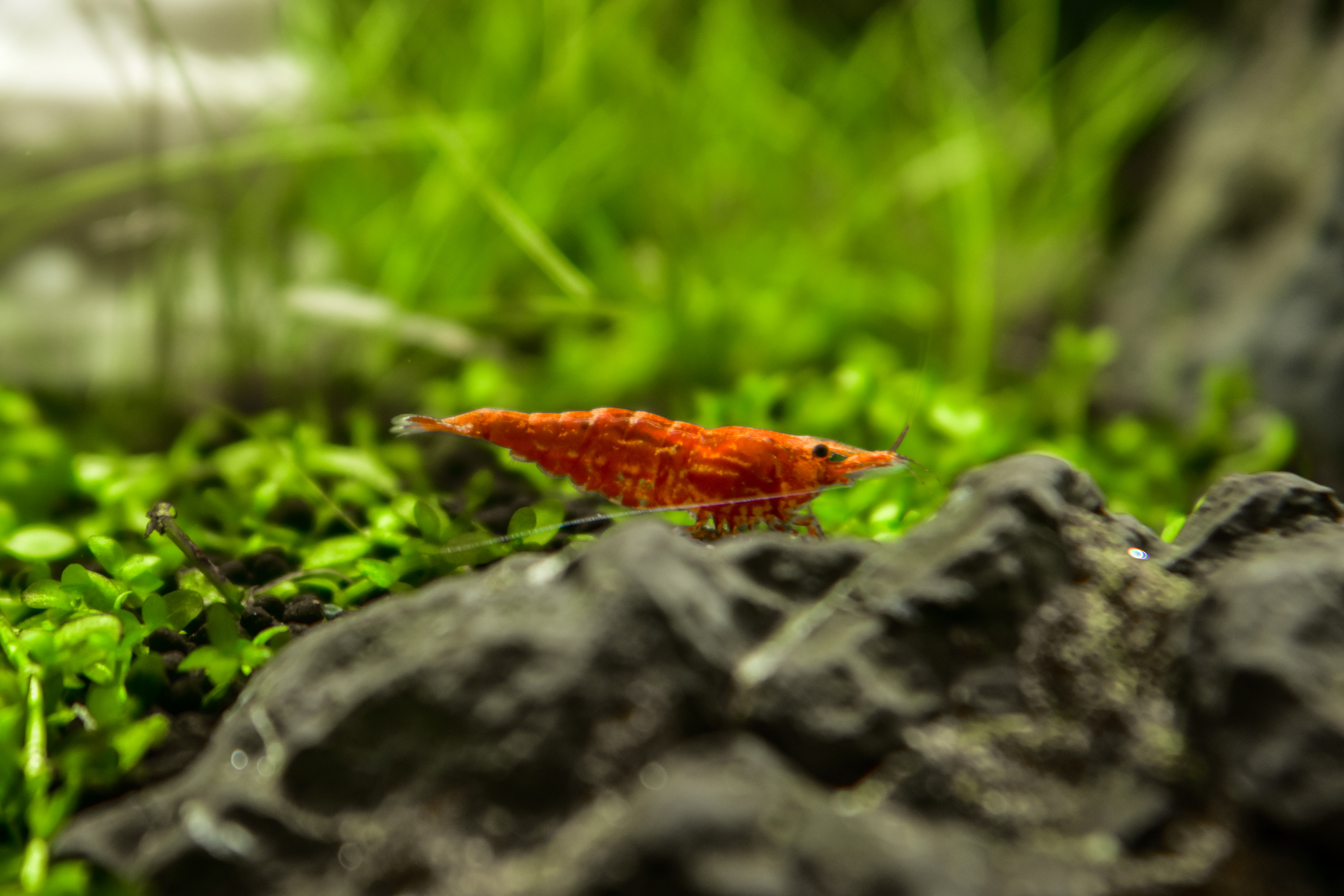
Red Cherry

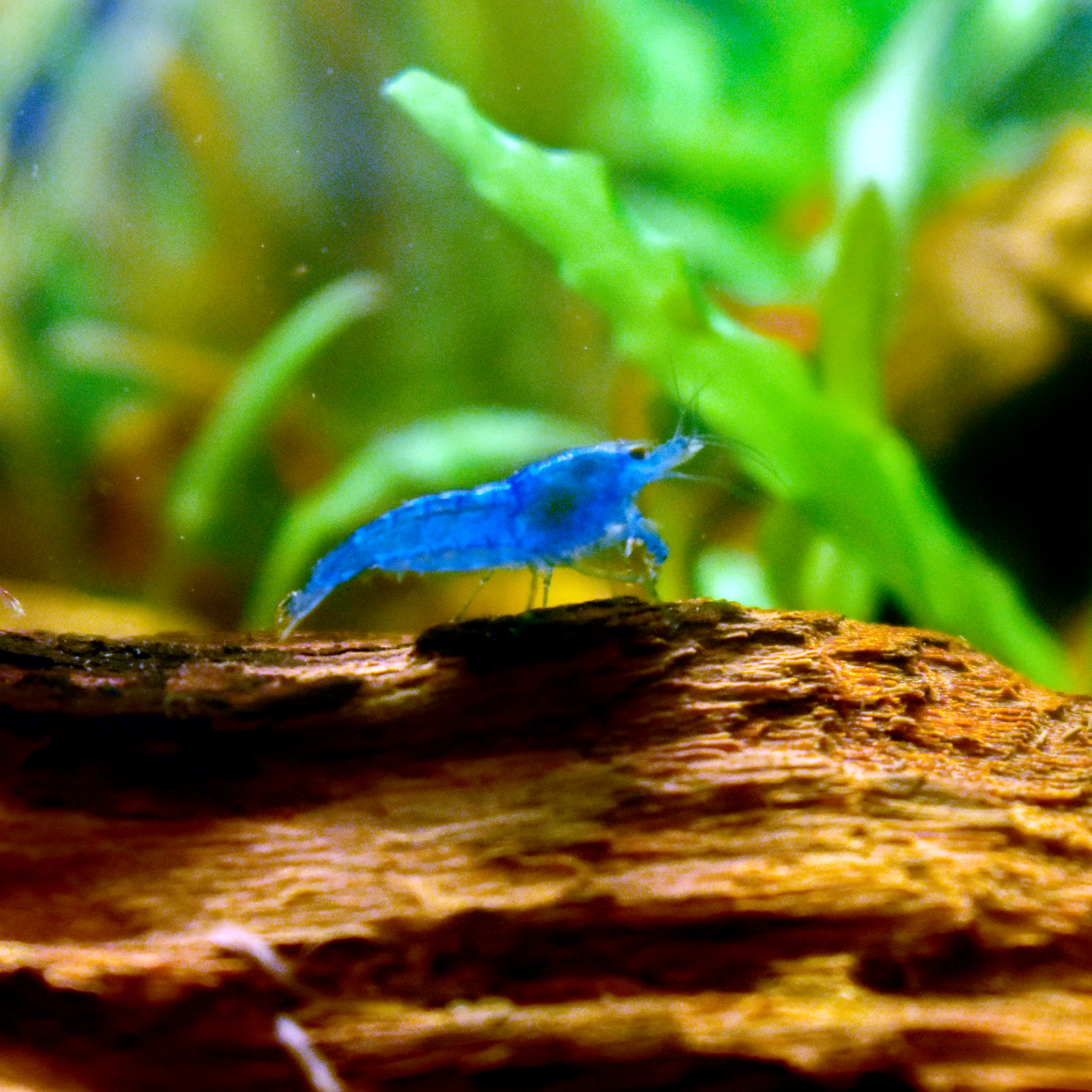
Blue Diamond

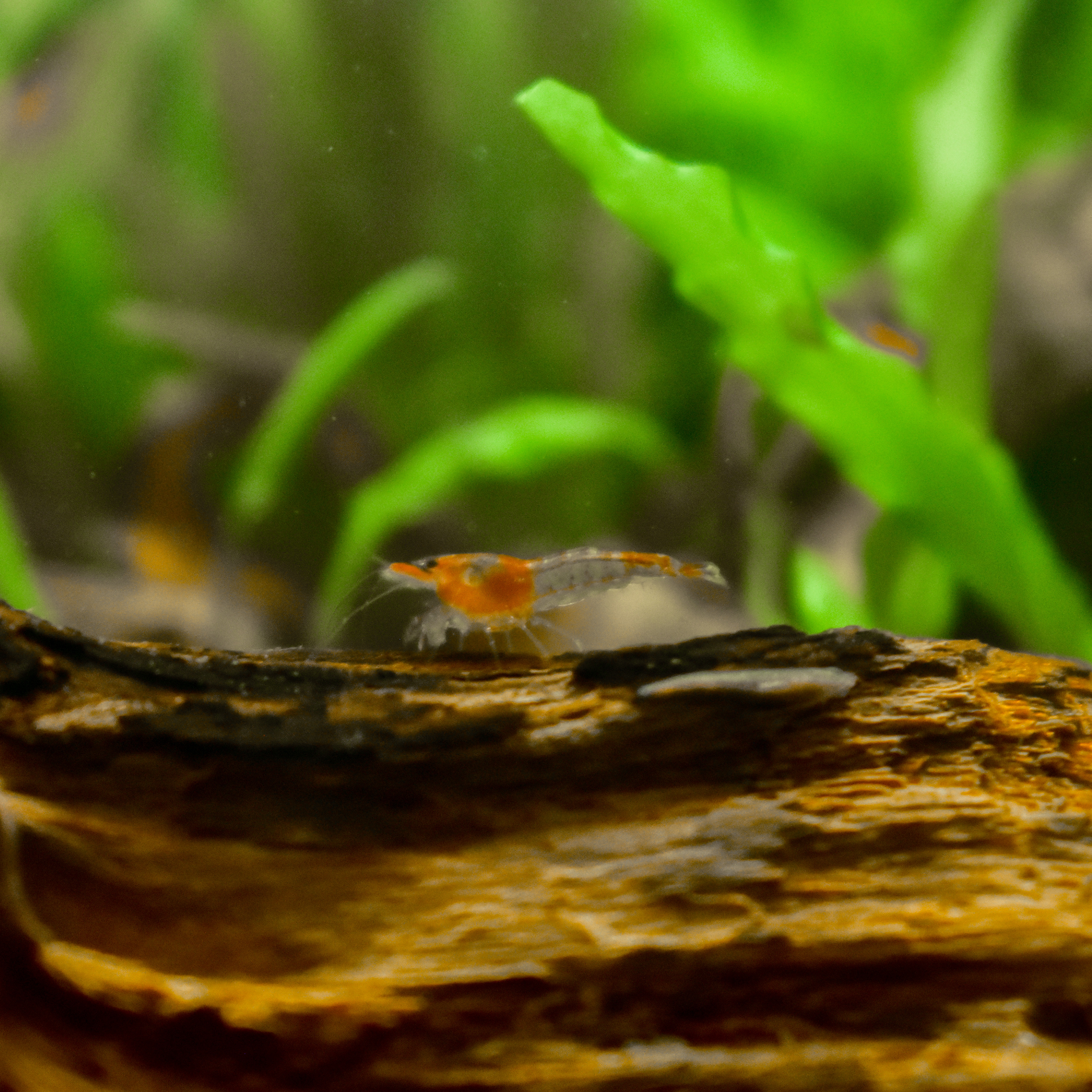
Red Rili

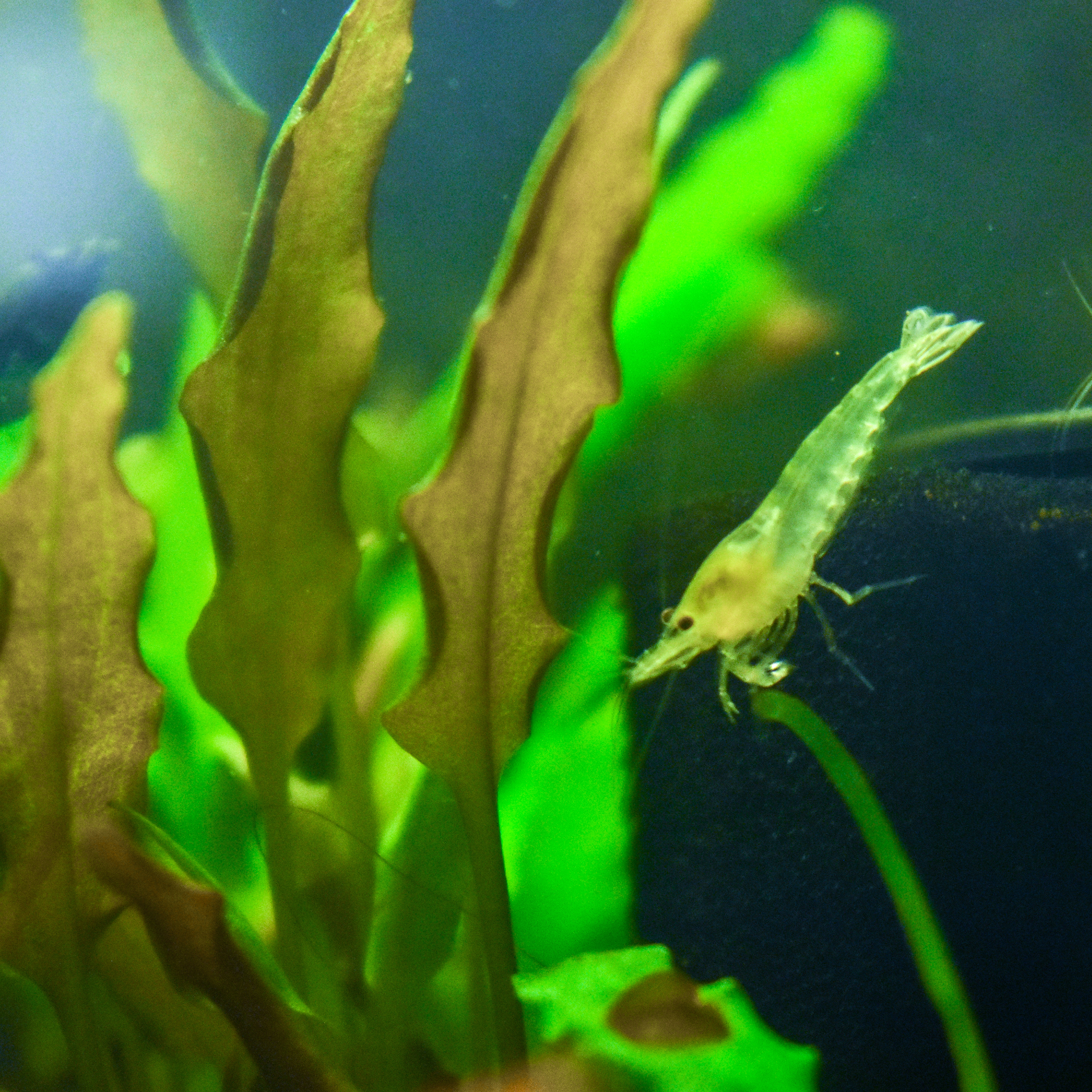
White Snow Ball

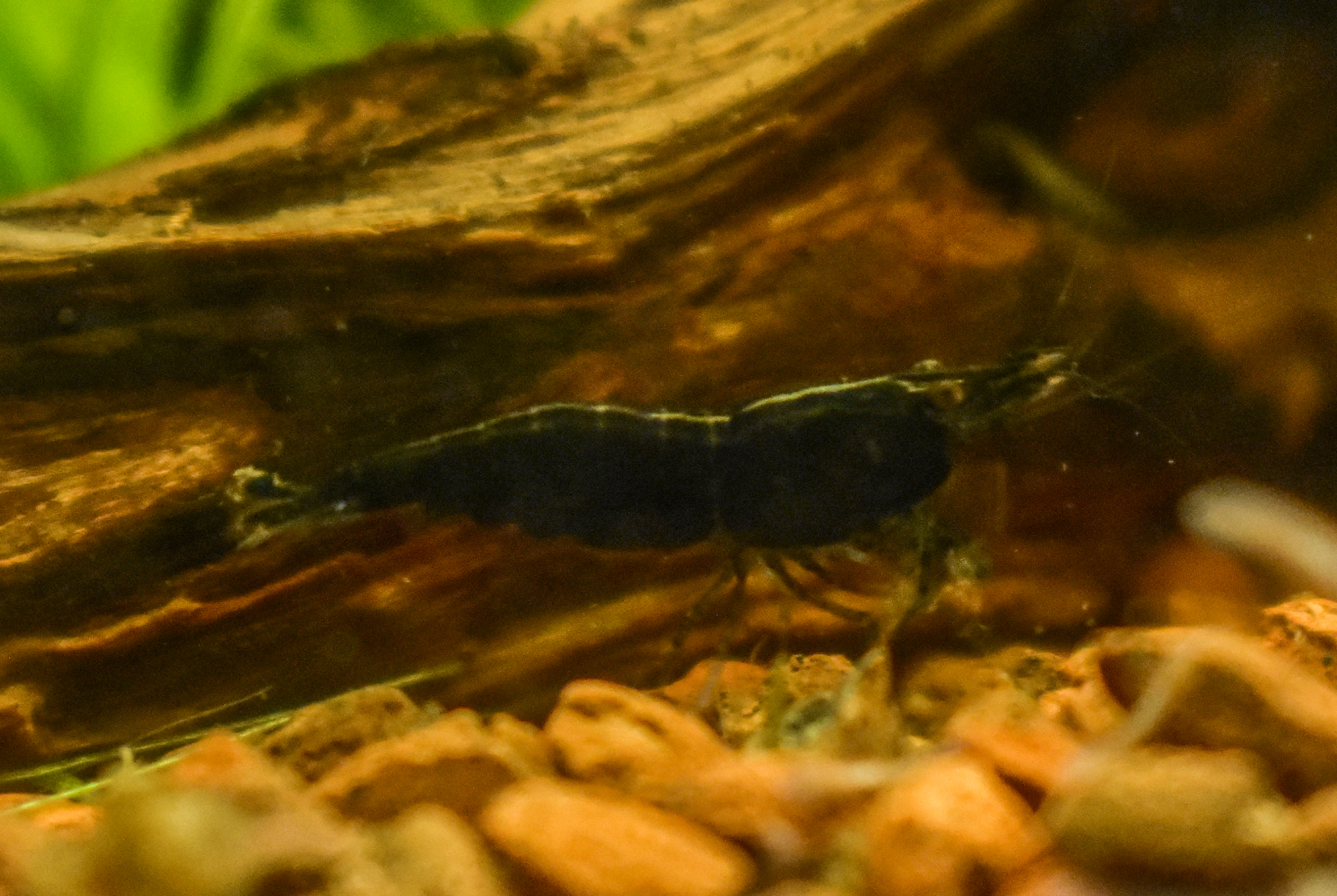
Choco Black Shrimp

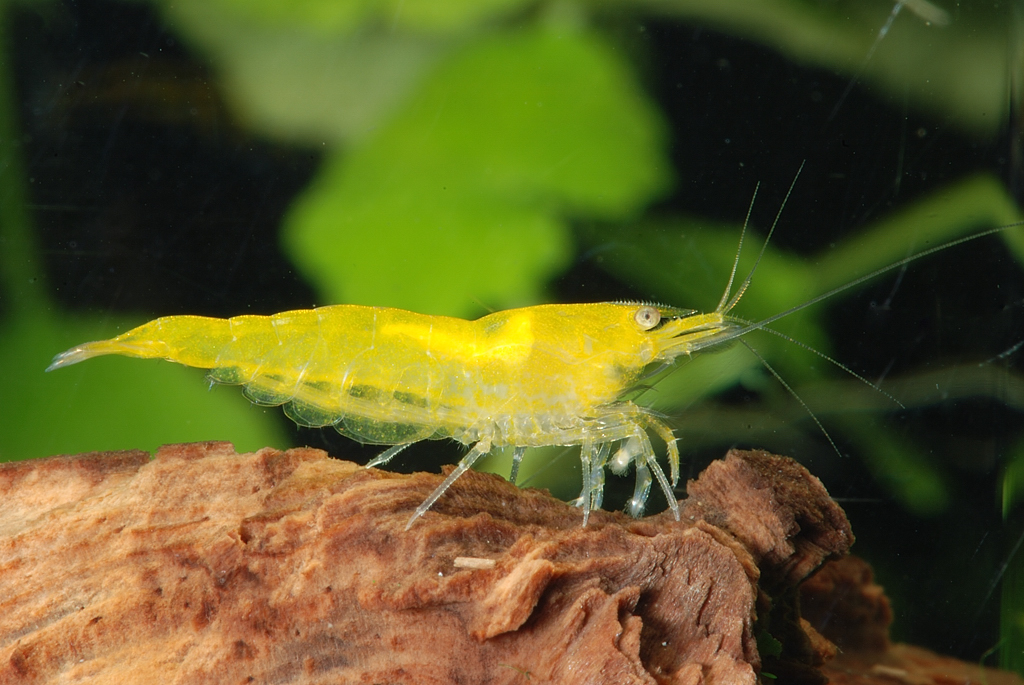
Lemon Yellow
