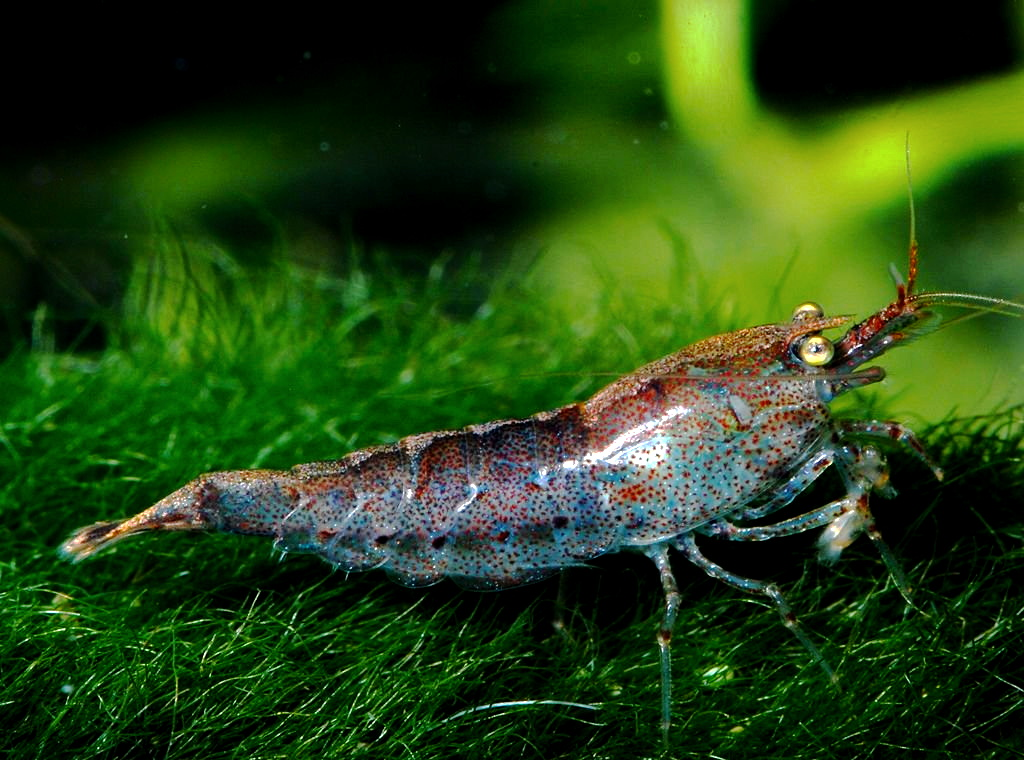

Conservation status
- Least Concern (IUCN 3.1)

Scientific classification
- Kingdom: Animalia
- Phylum: Arthropoda
- Class: Malacostraca
- Order: Decapoda
- Suborder: Pleocyemata
- Infraorder: Caridea
- Family: Atyidae
- Genus: Neocaridina
- Species: N. palmata

Binomial name
- Neocaridina palmata Shen, 1948

Synonyms
- Caridina palmata

= Neocaridina palmata =

Species of crustacean

Neocaridina palmata is a freshwater shrimp found in China and Vietnam. It is found in rivers, streams and ponds. Their preferred habitat is heavily planted, slow flowing water.

== Subspecies ==
There are 4 subspecies:

- Neocaridina palmata bosensis (Cai, 1996)
- Neocaridina palmata luodianica (Liang, 2004)
- Neocaridina palmata meridionalis (Liang, 2004)
- Neocaridina palmata palmata (Shen, 1948)

== Status ==
This species is considered to be abundant and stable, and thus is listed as Least Concern by the IUCN. No specific current threats were defined for this species.

== Human interaction ==
For local villages, these shrimps can have a high economic value. This is attributed to high population densities and fast reproduction rates, especially in mountain streams.
