= Neocaridina bamana =

Conservation status
- Data Deficient (IUCN 3.1)

Scientific classification
- Kingdom: Animalia
- Phylum: Arthropoda
- Class: Malacostraca
- Order: Decapoda
- Suborder: Pleocyemata
- Infraorder: Caridea
- Family: Atyidae
- Genus: Neocaridina
- Species: N. bamana

Binomial name
- Neocaridina bamana Liang, X., 2004

Synonyms
- Caridina bamana

Species of crustacean

Neocaridina bamana is a freshwater shrimp found in the Guangxi region of China. Besides that the species lives in freshwater, little is known about its habitat due to a lack of data about the collection site.
