= Triaenophoridae =

Scientific classification
- Kingdom: Animalia
- Phylum: Platyhelminthes
- Class: Cestoda
- Order: Bothriocephalidea
- Family: Triaenophoridae

Synonyms
- Amphicotylidae; Philobythiidae

Family of flatworms

Triaenophoridae is a family of flatworms belonging to the order Bothriocephalidea.

== Genera ==
Genera:

- Abothrium Van Beneden, 1871
- Ailinella Gil de Pertierra & Semenas, 2006
- Amphicotyle Diesing, 1863
- Anchistrocephalus Monticelli, 1890
- Anonchocephalus Lühe, 1902
- Australicola Kuchta & Scholz, 2006
- Bathybothrium Lühe, 1902
- Bathycestus Kuchta & Scholz, 2004
- Eubothrioides Yamaguti, 1952
- Eubothrium Nybelin, 1922
- Fistulicola Lühe, 1899
- Galaxitaenia Gil de Pertierra & Semenas, 2005
- Glossobothrium Yamaguti, 1952
- Kimocestus Kuchta, Scholz & Bray, 2008
- Marsipometra Cooper, 1917
- Metabothriocephalus Yamaguti, 1968
- Milanella Kuchta & Scholz, 2008
- Parabothrium Nybelin, 1922
- Philobythoides Campbell, 1979
- Philobythos Campbell, 1977
- Pistana Campbell & Gartner, 1982
- Probothriocephalus Campbell, 1979
- Pseudeubothrioides Yamaguti, 1968
- Triaenophorus Rudolphi, 1793
