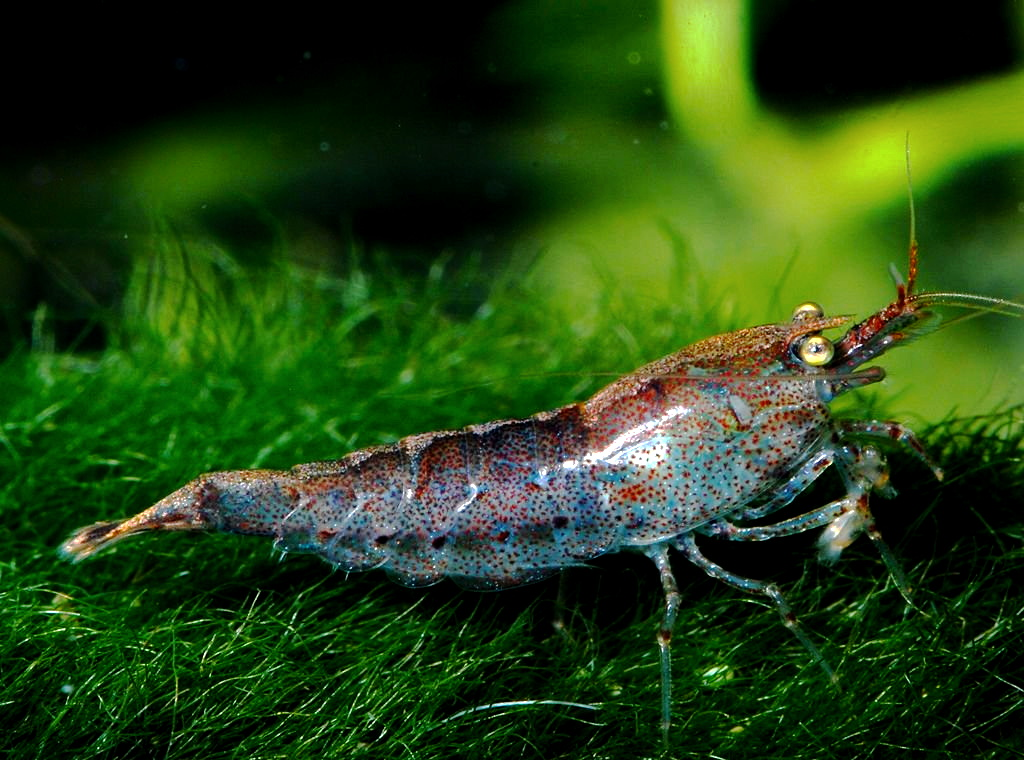
- Neocaridina palmata

Scientific classification
- Kingdom: Animalia
- Phylum: Arthropoda
- Clade: Pancrustacea
- Class: Malacostraca
- Order: Decapoda
- Suborder: Pleocyemata
- Infraorder: Caridea
- Family: Atyidae
- Genus: Neocaridina; Kubo, 1938

Type species
- Neocaridina denticulata (de Haan, 1844)

= Neocaridina =

Genus of freshwater shrimp

Neocaridina is a genus of small, land-locked freshwater shrimp in the family Atyidae (order Decapoda, infraorder Caridea) native to East Asia. The genus comprises roughly c. 25–30 described species (numbers vary with ongoing revision and differing treatments of synonyms and subspecies).

Several Neocaridina species are widely traded as ornamental aquarium shrimp, especially Neocaridina davidi (commonly known as “cherry shrimp”), which has been introduced outside its native range and has established populations in thermally altered waters and other suitable habitats in parts of Europe, North America, and elsewhere.

== Taxonomy and systematics ==
=== Establishment of the genus ===
Neocaridina was established by I. Kubo in 1938 during taxonomic work on Japanese atyid shrimp, separating a set of freshwater taxa from related genera within Atyidae. The type species is Neocaridina denticulata (de Haan, 1844).

=== Species delimitation and revision ===
Species-level taxonomy in Neocaridina has been repeatedly revised because many diagnostic morphological characters can be variable and because multiple lineages may be morphologically similar (cryptic diversity). Modern treatments commonly combine morphology with molecular data (e.g., COI barcoding and phylogenetic analyses) to resolve species boundaries and historical biogeography.

A well-studied example is Taiwan, where COI sequence datasets have been used to identify multiple Neocaridina taxa on the island and infer several separate colonisation events from mainland East Asia and the Japanese islands.

=== Nomenclatural notes (aquarium-traded taxa) ===
Some aquarium-traded “Neocaridina” have been historically reported under different names (including treatments involving N. heteropoda and N. denticulata complexes), contributing to persistent confusion in non-specialist contexts; integrative taxonomy continues to refine species limits and synonymies within these complexes.

== Description ==
=== General morphology ===
Members of Neocaridina are small caridean shrimp. As in other Atyidae, they have specialised mouthparts and feeding appendages adapted to grazing on fine organic material and biofilms on submerged surfaces. Diagnostic characters used in atyid shrimp taxonomy commonly include features of the rostrum, antennular and antennal segments, pereiopods (including setation and proportions), and reproductive structures such as the male first pleopod and appendix masculina on the second pleopod.

=== Life cycle strategy (land-locked freshwater habit) ===
Neocaridina species are often described as “land-locked” freshwater shrimp, completing their full life cycle in freshwater rather than requiring a prolonged marine or brackish larval phase typical of some other caridean lineages. This life history trait is relevant to dispersal, population structure, and island biogeography within East Asia.

== Distribution and habitat ==
=== Native range ===
Neocaridina is distributed across East Asia, including (depending on species) eastern Russia, the Korean Peninsula, the main islands of Japan and the Ryukyus, Taiwan, continental China, and Vietnam. Regional phylogeographic analyses on Taiwan support multiple origins of island lineages from mainland China and the Japanese archipelago via several colonisation routes over time.

=== Habitats ===
Species occur in inland freshwater habitats such as streams and rivers, and can be found associated with a variety of microhabitats including runs and riffles, aquatic vegetation, and leaf litter and other detrital substrates.

== Ecology ==
=== Feeding and ecosystem roles ===
Atyid shrimp can be important benthic consumers in freshwater systems, grazing on periphyton/biofilms and processing fine organic matter, thereby influencing algal biomass, community composition, and nutrient cycling. While many ecosystem-function studies focus on other atyid taxa, these findings are broadly relevant to understanding the ecological role of atyid shrimp assemblages that include Neocaridina.

=== Introduced-population ecology (Neocaridina davidi) ===
Where introduced, Neocaridina davidi can form persistent populations in suitable habitats, including thermally polluted streams. Field studies in Germany documented stable occurrence and population dynamics in warm-water systems (e.g., the Gillbach and connected waters), and noted association with human-modified habitats and pathways linked to the aquarium trade.

Experimental and observational work has also examined potential ecological effects of N. davidi, including altered structure of freshwater meiofaunal assemblages in controlled systems, supporting the view that high-density populations can influence lower trophic levels.

== Relationship with humans ==
=== Aquarium trade ===
Neocaridina species—especially Neocaridina davidi—are widely kept as ornamental freshwater shrimp in home aquaria and are distributed internationally through the aquatic pet trade. The popularity of selectively bred colour morphs is a major driver of trade volume and repeated introductions into non-native regions via release or escape.

=== Introduced and invasive populations ===
Introduced Neocaridina populations have been documented in multiple regions. On O‘ahu (Hawai‘i), an introduced Neocaridina taxon was found in high densities across multiple drainages and was inferred to be a relatively recent introduction based on survey history and rapid appearance at multiple sites.

In Europe, N. davidi has been repeatedly recorded from thermally altered waters and canals, including DNA-confirmed records and reports of range expansion; studies have emphasised links to aquarium-trade availability and thermal refugia that enable persistence and spread.

Risk-screening and synthesis documents for the United States have assessed N. davidi as a nonindigenous species of concern and summarised evidence on establishment pathways, potential ecological effects, and the role of ornamental trade in introductions.

== Species ==
The exact composition of Neocaridina varies by taxonomic treatment. A widely cited global catalogue of caridean shrimp provides a baseline species compilation for the genus, with multiple additional species described subsequently in regional revisions (e.g., Taiwan) and integrative studies.

The following list largely follows De Grave & Fransen (2011) with later additions where explicitly sourced:

- Neocaridina anhuiensis Liang, Zhu & Xiong, 1984
- Neocaridina bamana (Liang, 2004)
- Neocaridina brevidactyla (Liang, Chen & W.-X. Li, 2005)
- Neocaridina curvifrons Liang, 1979
- Neocaridina davidi (Bouvier, 1904)
- Neocaridina denticulata (de Haan, 1844
- Neocaridina euspinosa Cai, 1996
- Neocaridina fonticulata Shih, Cai & Chiu, 2019
- Neocaridina fukiensis Liang & Yan, 1977
- Neocaridina gracilipoda (Liang, 2004)
- Neocaridina hofendopoda Shen, 1948
- Neocaridina homospina (as treated in catalogues and subsequent literature)
- Neocaridina iriomotensis Naruse, Shokita & Cai, 2006
- Neocaridina ishigakiensis Fujino & Shokita, 1975
- Neocaridina ketagalan Shih & Cai, 2007
- Neocaridina keunbaei H. S. Kim, 1976
- Neocaridina linfenensis Cai, 1996
- Neocaridina longipoda Cai, 1995
- Neocaridina palmata (Shen, 1948)
- Neocaridina saccam Shih & Cai, 2007
- Neocaridina spinosa Liang, 1964
- Neocaridina xiapuensis Zheng, 2002
- Neocaridina yueluensis Chen, Chen & Guo, 2018
- Neocaridina zhangjiajiensis Cai, 1996
- Neocaridina zhoushanensis Cai, 1996
- Neocaridina kubo Shih & Cai, 2007

For a complete and current taxonomic account, consult up-to-date taxonomic databases and recent integrative revisions, as species concepts and synonymies within Neocaridina continue to change with ongoing research.
