= Bothriocephalidea =

Scientific classification
- Kingdom: Animalia
- Phylum: Platyhelminthes
- Class: Cestoda
- Order: Bothriocephalidea

Families
- Bothriocephalidae; Echinophallidae; Triaenophoridae

Order of flatworms

Bothriocephalidea is an order of Cestoda (tapeworms). Members of this order are gut parasites of vertebrates.
