= Pilok =

Subdistrict in Kanchanaburi province, Thailand

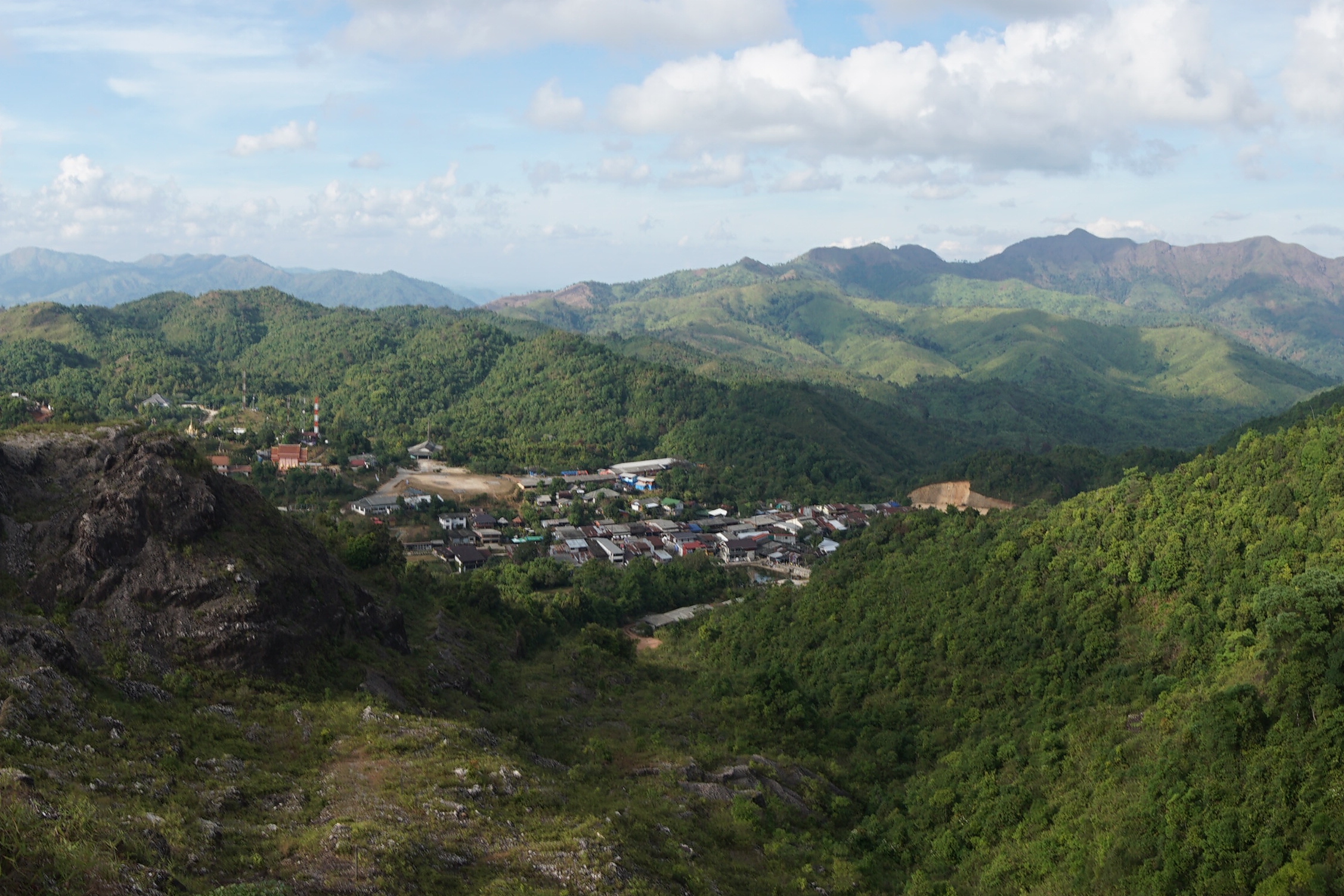
The village of Ban I-tong, seen from Noen Chang Suek

Pilok (Thai: ปิล็อก or ปิล๊อก, (Note: ปิล็อก is the orthographically correct spelling preferred by the Royal Society, while the Ministry of Interior uses the spelling ปิล๊อก.) pronounced [pi.lɔ́k]) is a subdistrict (tambon) in Thong Pha Phum District of Thailand's Kanchanaburi Province. Its main settlement, Ban I-tong (บ้านอีต่อง, [bâːn ʔīː.tɔ̀ŋ]), is a remote village on the Myanmar border, and is surrounded by Thong Pha Phum National Park, which takes up most of the subdistrict's area. Pilok rose as a mining boomtown in the 1940s, when tin and tungsten mines were established in the area, but suffered greatly from the tin market crash of 1985, after which its mines ceased operation. The village has since seen revival as a tourist destination.

== History ==
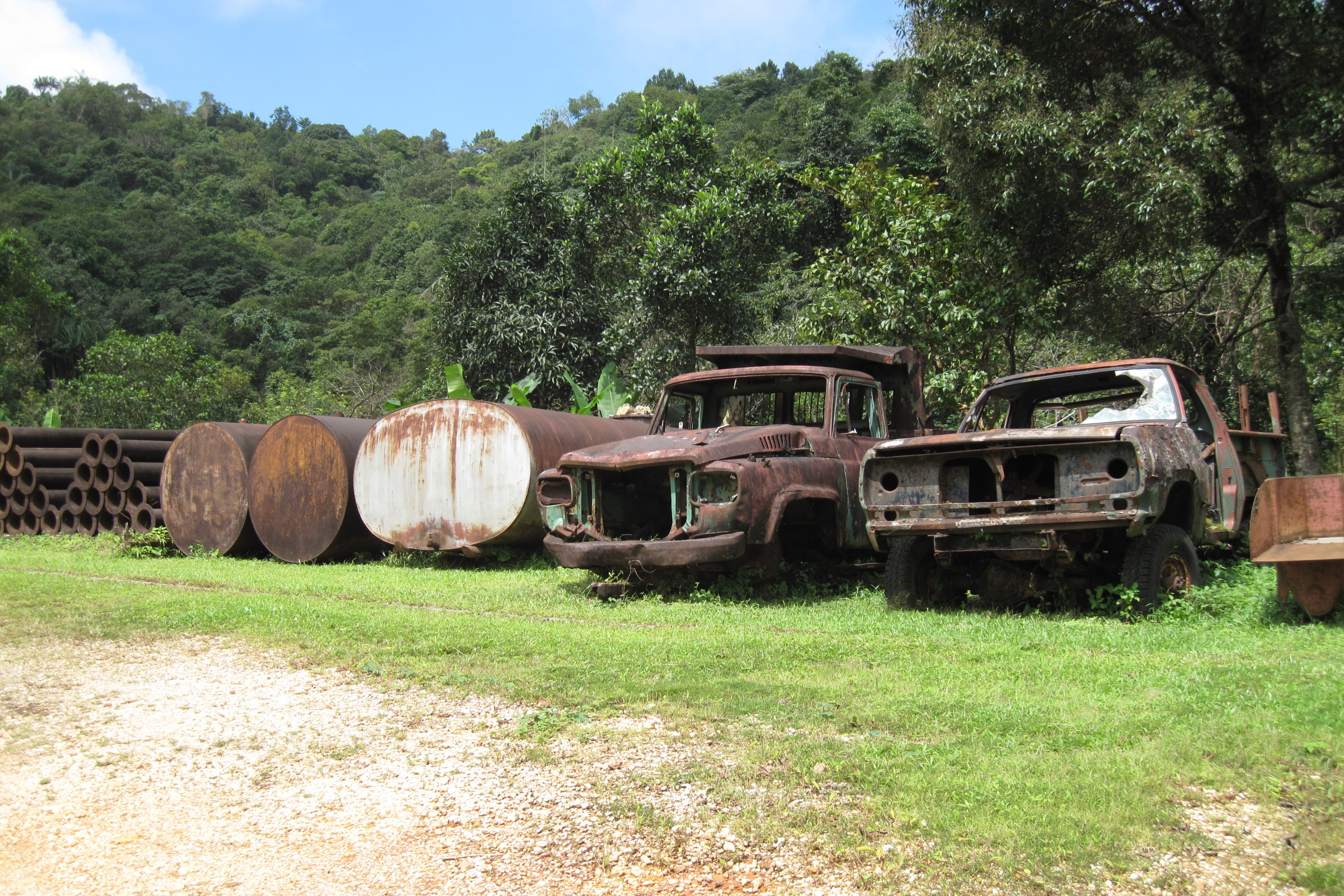
Abandoned equipment at the Pilok Mine in 2014

The exact discovery of Pilok's tin and tungsten deposits have not been documented, but the earliest mining operations were probably done by small-scale Burmese prospectors working in the frontier region. Official Thai involvement began in 1940 when the (now-defunct) state-owned Mines Organization established the Pilok Mine. Private mining operations then followed, soon numbering over fifty.

Initially, mining operations were hindered by the harsh inaccessibility of the region. Ore from the mines had to be transported by elephant to Tha Khanun on the Khwae Noi River, from where it was two days by boat (five days if travelling upstream) to the provincial centre of Kanchanaburi. A road was soon built, linking the mines to the river by 1950, and by the 1980s partially paved roads provided year-round direct access to the mines from Kanchanaburi. Pilok became a bustling mining town, serving thousands of workers, with two cinemas and an airfield.

The name Pilok was probably derived from the Thai term phi lok (ผีหลอก, to be scared by ghosts), a reference to the area's hostile conditions as well as violent early history, when clashes between Thai authorities and Burmese workers left many dead. The village name of I-tong comes from Burmese: နတ်အိမ်တောင် (nat im taung), meaning "mountain of spirits".

In 1985, the global tin market crashed, and tin prices plunged. Pilok's mining companies had to close down, and the mines were abandoned. Most of the population left, and Pilok/I-tong was reduced to almost a ghost town.

As part of conservation plans of the Western Forest Complex beginning in 1991, most of the forested area of Pilok Subdistrict became included under the new Thong Pha Phum National Park, which was officially established in 2009. The village has since seen somewhat of a revival, as its remoteness became an attraction for tourists. Much of the remaining population of I-tong have adopted the new tourism-oriented economy, with many homes converted to cafes and homestays.

== Geography and administration ==
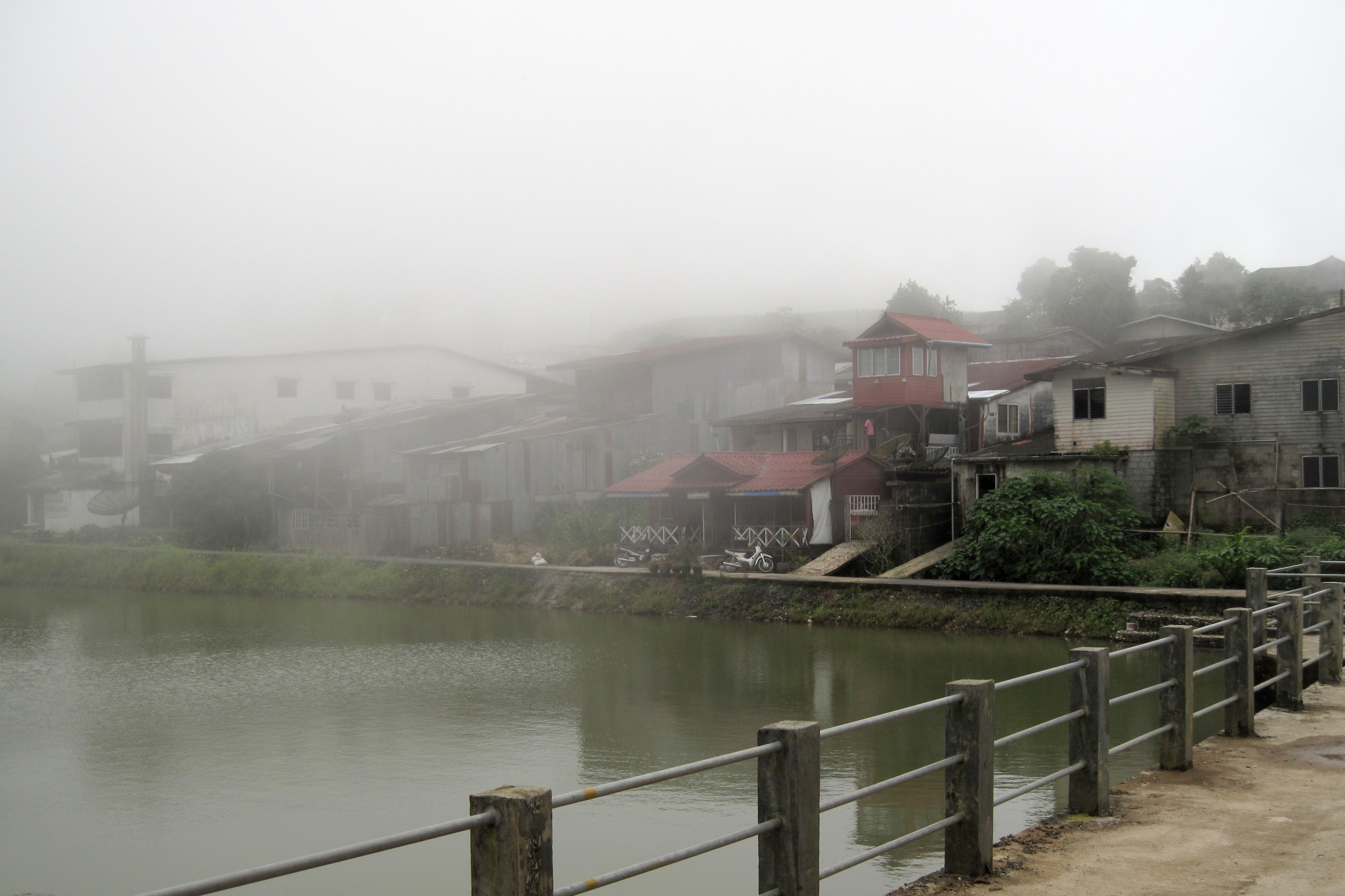
Mist rolling into Ban I-tong, 2014

Pilok Subdistrict covers an area of 725 square kilometres (280 sq mi), about 95% of which is natural forest, in the Tenasserim Hills of Western Thailand. The subdistrict contains four villages (muban): I-tong, Bo-ong (โบอ่อง), Mai Rai Pa (ใหม่ไร่ป้า) and Pilok Khi (ปิล๊อกคี่), with a total population of 6,512 from 2,365 households. Its local administration falls entirely under the Pilok Subdistrict Administration Organization.

Ban I-tong (14°40′45″N 98°22′10″E) lies at an elevation of 800 metres (2,600 ft) on the Myanmar border, 75 km (47 mi) by road from the district centre and 210 km (130 mi) from Kanchanaburi. A gas pipeline from Myanmar's Yadana gas field also passes through I-tong, and provides it with electricity. The other three villages are accessible only by boat across the Vajiralongkorn Dam reservoir, and rely on solar energy.

== Places ==
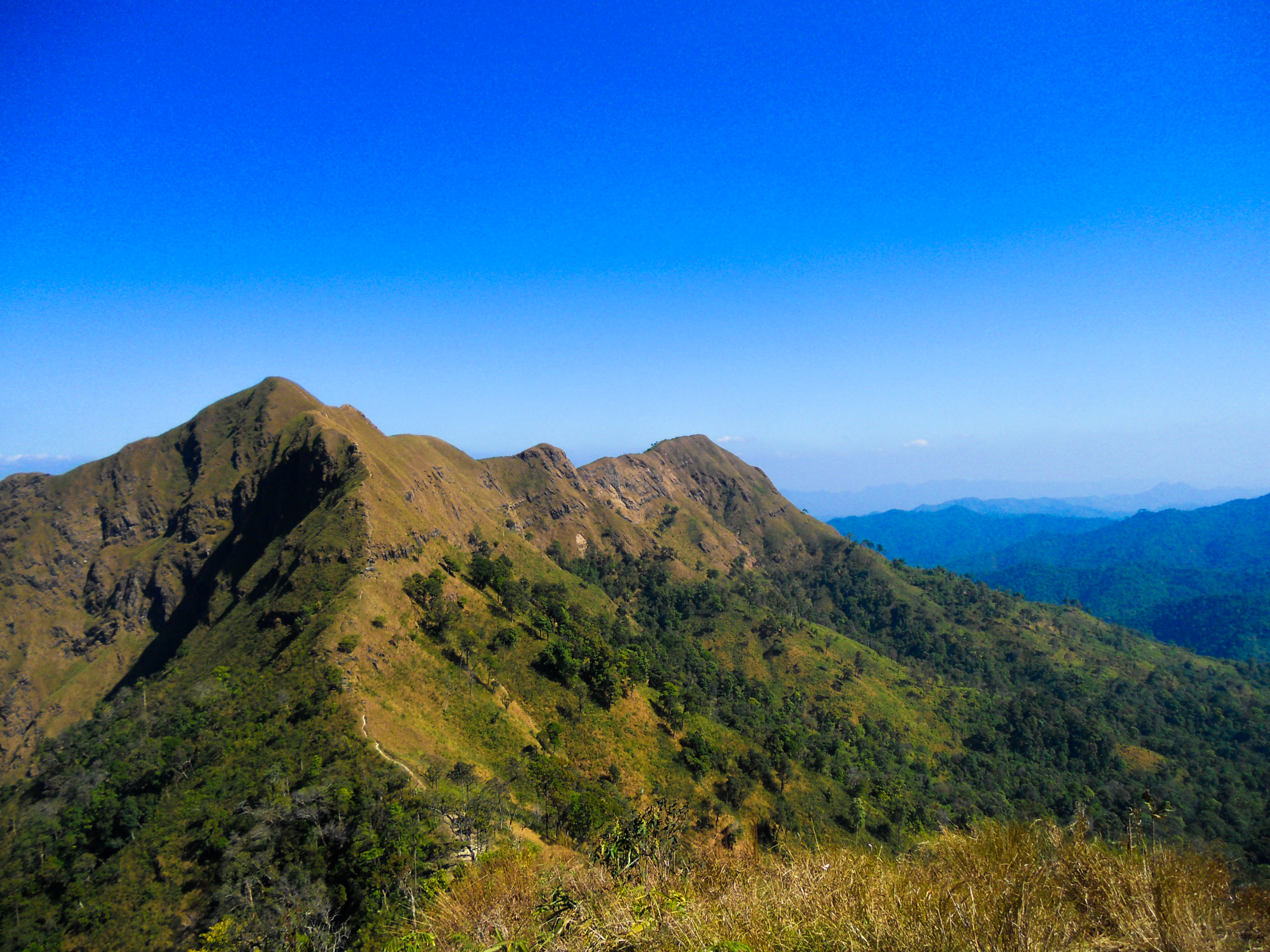
Khao Chang Phueak is the highest peak in Thong Pha Phum National Park.

Pilok has various places of interest, many of which are natural features within Thong Pha Phum National Park. The village of I-tong itself has become a tourist destination for its rustic atmosphere and the fog which regularly rolls in over the surrounding hills. In the village's vicinity, the site of the abandoned Pilok Mine, with its old buildings and machinery, is open to the public, and the Buddhist temple Wat Mueang Pilok (วัดเหมืองปิล็อก) sits on a hill overlooking the village. Another hill, Noen Sao Thong (เนินเสาธง, "flagpole hill") lies on the border itself, and also features a viewpoint under the twin poles which fly the flags of Thailand and Myanmar side by side. There is a border crossing nearby, but it is not open to the public.

South of Ban I-tong, the hill of Noen Chang Suek (เนินช้างศึก, "war elephant hill", 1,053 metres (3,455 ft) above sea level) provides views over the village as well as the surrounding area, and on clear days the Andaman Sea, 50 kilometres (31 mi) away on the Myanmar side, is reportedly visible. The viewpoint is within the Chang Suek Operations Base of the Border Patrol Police, but is open to visitors and also features a popular campsite.

Within the national park, the 1,249-metre (4,098 ft)-high Khao Chang Phueak is the highest point in the area, and the seasonal hike across its narrow ridge is a popular activity. Chokkradin Waterfall is nearby.

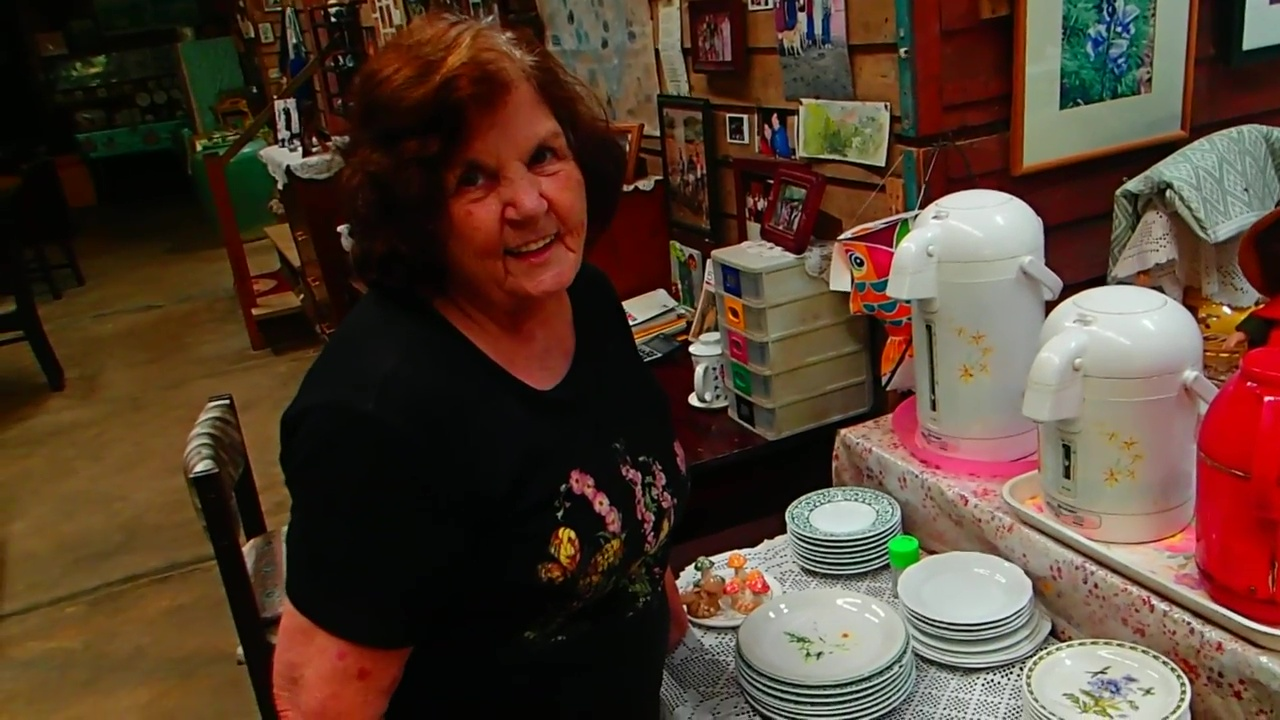
Auntie Glen at the Forest Glade guesthouse

Also surrounded by the national park is the Somsak Mining Forest Glade, a guesthouse set in the grounds of a former mine. It is owned and operated by Glennis Setabundhu or Auntie Glen, an Australian who moved with her Thai husband Somsak to the country in the 1960s. Following the mine's closure, and her husband's death in 1994, Glennis reopened the mine as a guesthouse in order to keep the place alive and support the mine's former workers. Known for its remote location in the middle of the forest, access to the Forest Glade requires a 5-kilometre (3.1 mi)-drive via all-terrain vehicle. The nearby Chet Mit Waterfall (น้ำตกเจ็ดมิตร, "seven friends waterfall") is within the mine's concession area.

Across the Vajiralongkorn Dam reservoir, Phra That Bo-ong (in Ban Bo-ong) is a centuries-old stupa built on top of a rocky outcrop in the middle of a lake. It is regarded as sacred by the Buddhist Karens who form the local population.
