= Khuean Srinagarindra National Park =

National park in Thailand

- อุทยานแห่งชาติเขื่อนศรีนครินทร์
- IUCN category II (national park)
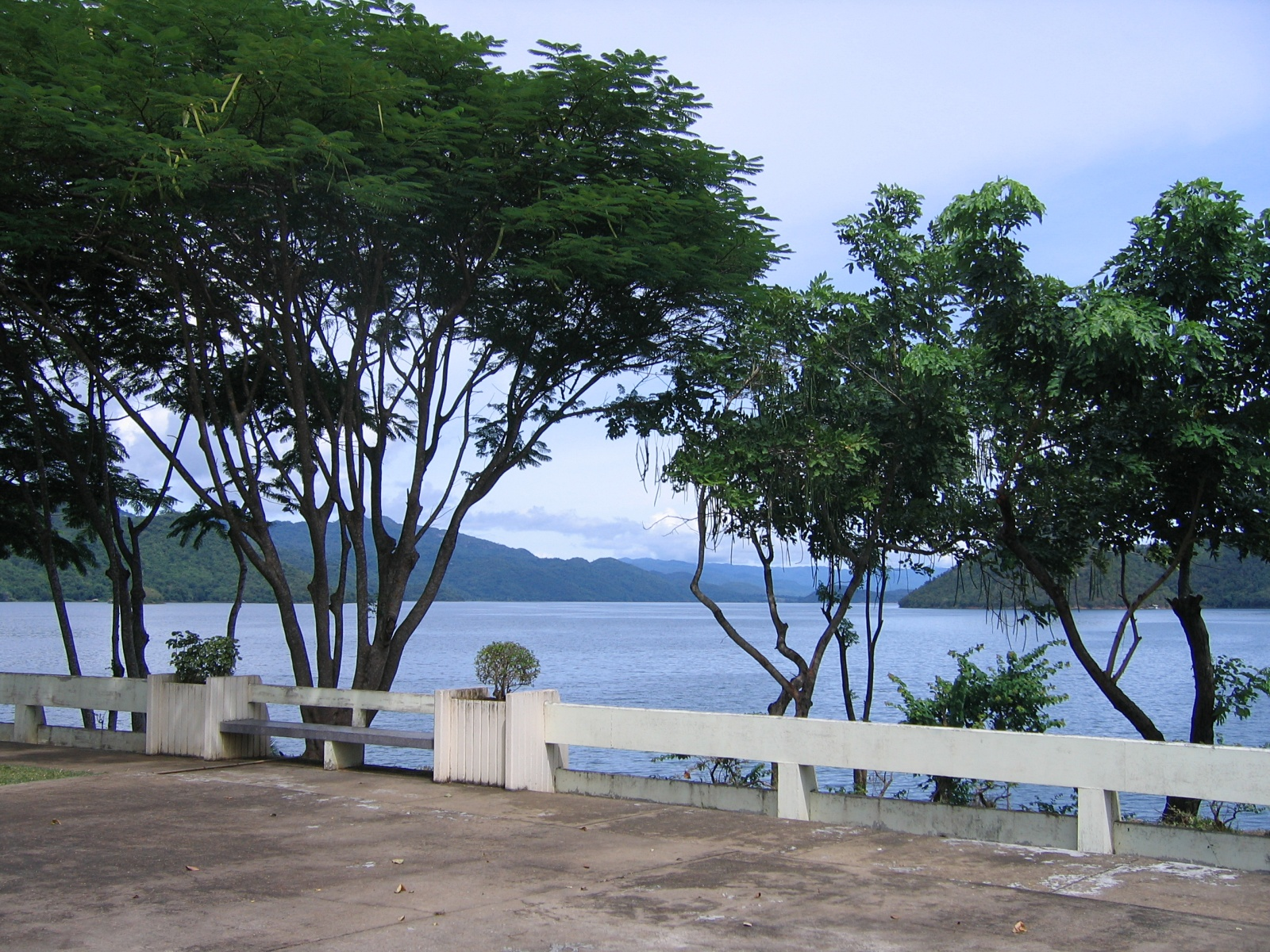
- Srinagarind Reservoir

- Location within Thailand
- Location: Kanchanaburi province, Thailand
- Nearest city: Kanchanaburi
- Coordinates: 14°44′39″N 99°2′10″E
- Area: 1,532 km^{2} (592 sq mi)
- Established: 23 December 1981
- Visitors: 70,980 (in 2024)
- Governing body: Department of National Parks, Wildlife and Plant Conservation

Khuean Srinagarindra National Park (Thai: อุทยานแห่งชาติเขื่อนศรีนครินทร์, RTGS: Utthayan Haeng Chat Khuean Si Nakharin, pronounced [ʔùt.tʰā.jāːn hɛ̀ŋ t͡ɕʰâːt kʰɯ̀a̯n sǐː ná(ʔ).kʰā.rīn]; "Srinagarind Dam National Park") is a national park in Kanchanaburi province, Thailand. The park, centred on the Srinagarind Reservoir, is part of the Western Forest Complex protected area.

== Geography ==
Khuean Srinagarindra National Park is 105 kilometres (65 mi) northwest of Kanchanaburi town in Sai Yok, Si Sawat and Thong Pha Phum districts. The park's area is 957,500 rai ~ 1,532 square kilometres (592 sq mi) and neighboring (from southeast clockwise) Salak Phra Wildlife Sanctuary, Erawan National Park, Sai Yok National Park, Thong Pha Phum National Park, Khao Laem National Park, Lam Khlong Ngu National Park, Thung Yai Naresuan Wildlife Sanctuary and Phu Toei National Park. At the heart of the park is the Srinagarind Reservoir, a reservoir created by the damming of the Khwae Yai river by the Srinagarind Dam. There are many creaks flow into this reservoir, such as Huai Mae Khamin, Huai Kha Khaeng, Huai Mae Wong, Huai Kriankrai and Huai Mae Phlu. The highest altitude is about 1,100 metres (3,600 ft) high.

== History ==
The park's caves, particularly Tham Phra Prang, were used by Thai soldiers as a hiding place during the Burmese-Siamese wars of the 18th century.

Srinagarind Reservoir formed on completion of the Srinagarind Dam in 1980. On 23 December 1981, Khuean Srinagarindra was designated the 39th national park.

== Climate ==
This park is in the rain shadow of the hills, resulting in less average rainfall than other parts of Thailand. As result, the maximum temperature is 44 °C (111 °F) in April and the minimum temperature is 8 °C (46 °F) in December. The average mean temperature is 27 °C (81 °F). The average rainfall is 1,600 millimetres (63 in)/year.

The region's annual weather patterns are divided into three main seasonal periods:

1. Rainy season: mid-April to mid-October
2. Cold season: November to February
3. Summer: March to April

== Flora ==
There are three types of forest, namely: Mixed deciduous forest, Dry dipterocarp forest and Dry evergreen forest.

=== Mixed deciduous forest ===
- Afzelia xylocarpa
- Bambusa nutans
- Careya arborea
- Dendrocalamus strictus
- Lagerstroemia floribunda
- Pterocarpus macrocarpus
- Spondias pinnata
- Terminalia elliptica
- Thyrsostachys siamensis

=== Dry dipterocarp forest ===
- Schleichera oleosa
- Shorea robusta

=== Dry evergreen forest ===
- Bombax anceps
- Canarium subulatum
- Chrozophora tinctoria
- Chukrasia velutina
- Hopea ferrea
- Hydnocarpus ilicifolia
- Memecylon ovatum
- Millettia sp.
- Tetrameles nudiflora
- Toona ciliata

== Fauna ==
=== Mammals ===
The number of sightings of mammals in the park include the following species:

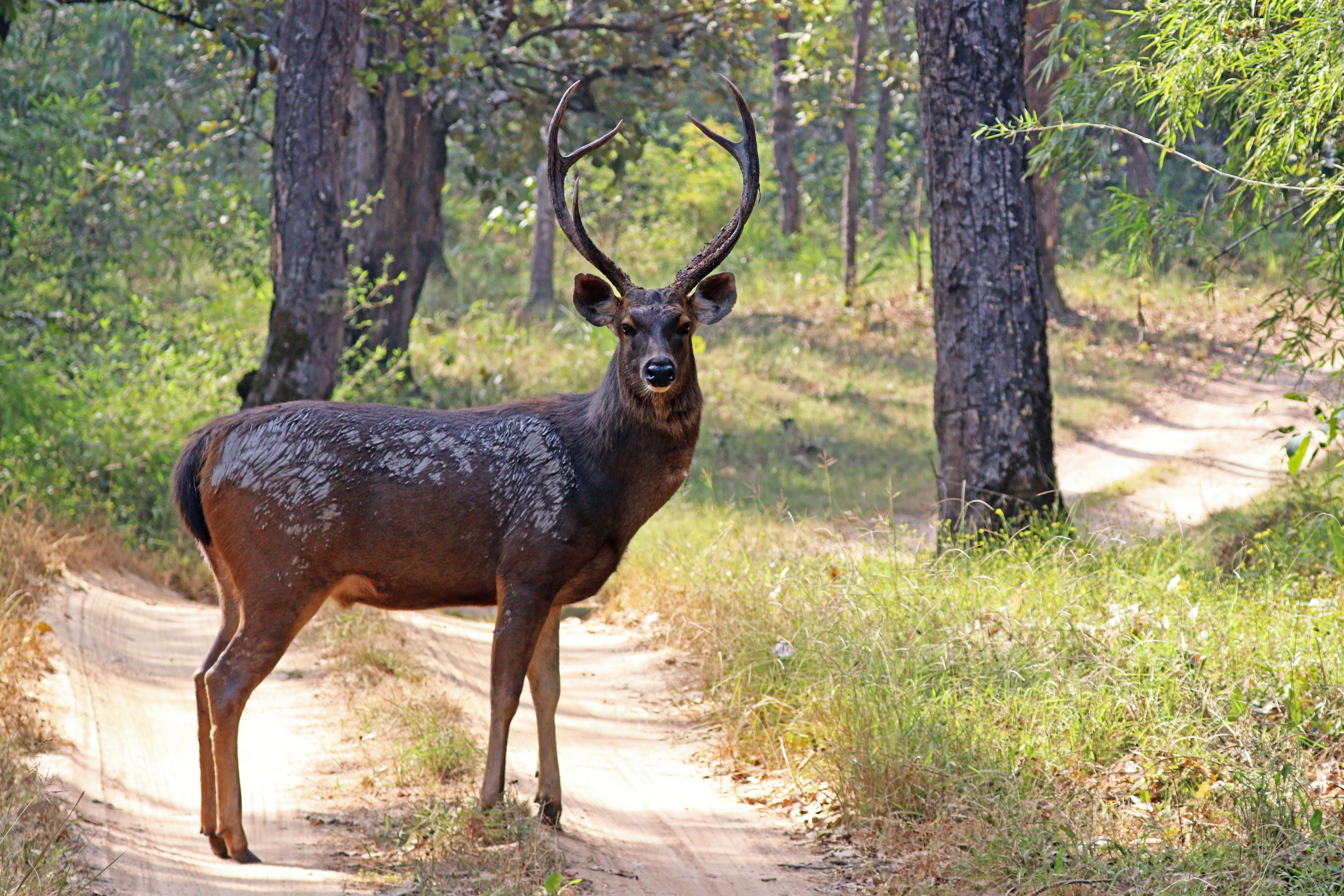
Sambar deer

- Asian elephant
- Asian palm civet
- Asian wild dog
- Bamboo rat
- Bengal tiger
- Black giant squirrel
- Burmese hare
- Fox
- Gaur
- Grey-bellied squirrel
- Lesser mouse-deer
- Mainland serow
- Malayan porcupine
- Muntjac
- Northern pig-tailed macaque
- Phayre's leaf monkey
- Red giant flying squirrel
- Sambar deer
- Slow loris
- White-handed gibbon
- Yellow-throated marten

== Birds ==
The park has 142 species of birds from 52 families.

=== Passerine ===
82 species of passerine from 30 families, represented by one species:

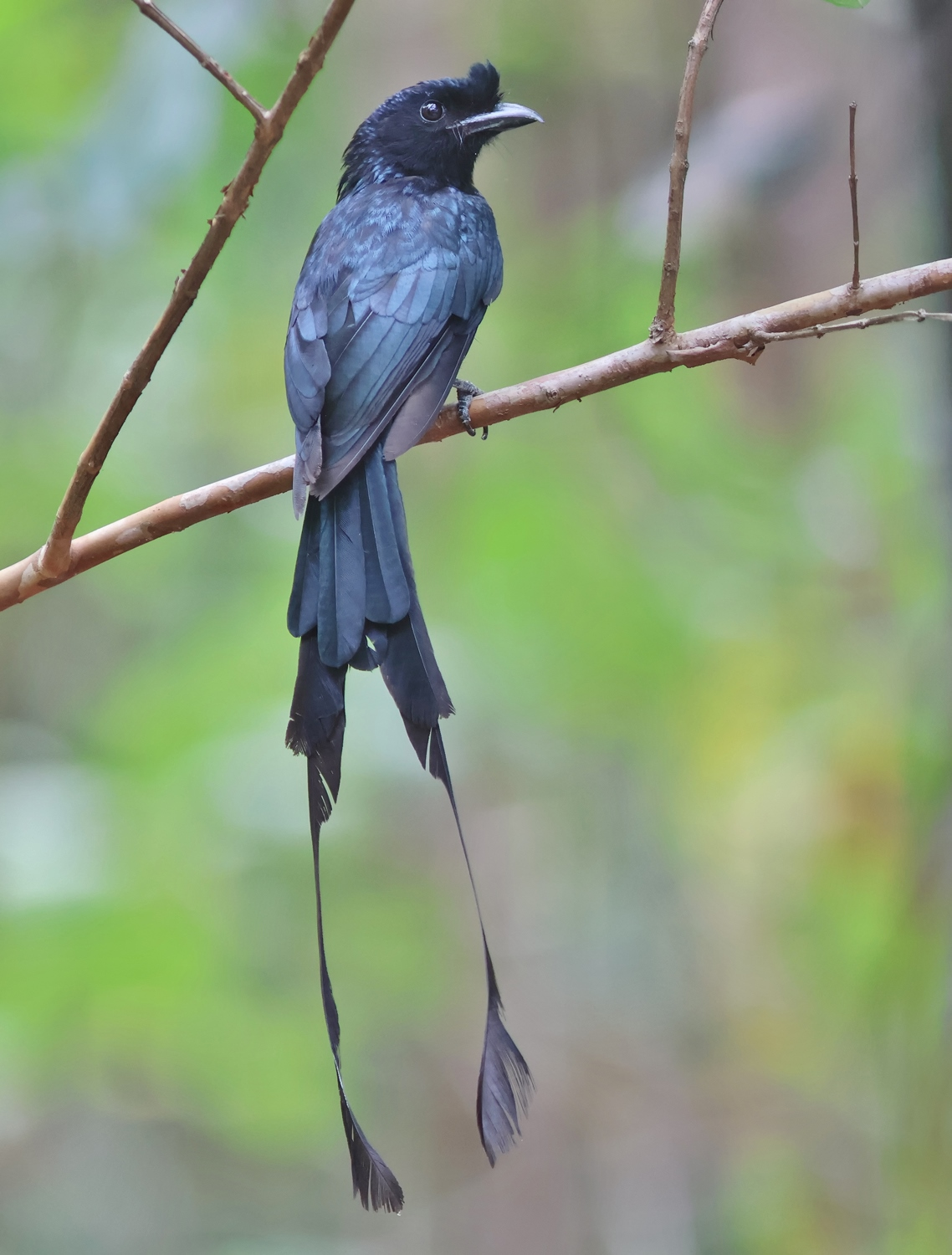
Greater racket-tailed drongo

- Ashy woodswallow
- Asian golden weaver
- Black-naped monarch
- Black-naped oriole
- Blue-winged pitta
- Common hill myna
- Common iora
- Dark-necked tailorbird
- Eastern red-rumped swallow
- Eurasian tree sparrow
- Forest wagtail
- Golden-fronted leafbird
- Gray-headed canary-flycatcher
- Greater racket-tailed drongo
- Indochinese blue flycatcher
- Lesser necklaced laughingthrush
- Long-tailed shrike
- Malaysian pied-fantail
- Ornate sunbird
- Pin-striped tit-babbler
- Puff-throated babbler
- Red-billed blue-magpie
- Scaly-breasted munia
- Scarlet-backed flowerpecker
- Sooty-headed bulbul
- Thick-billed warbler
- Velvet-fronted nuthatch
- White-bellied erpornis
- Yellow-bellied warbler
- Yellow-vented warbler

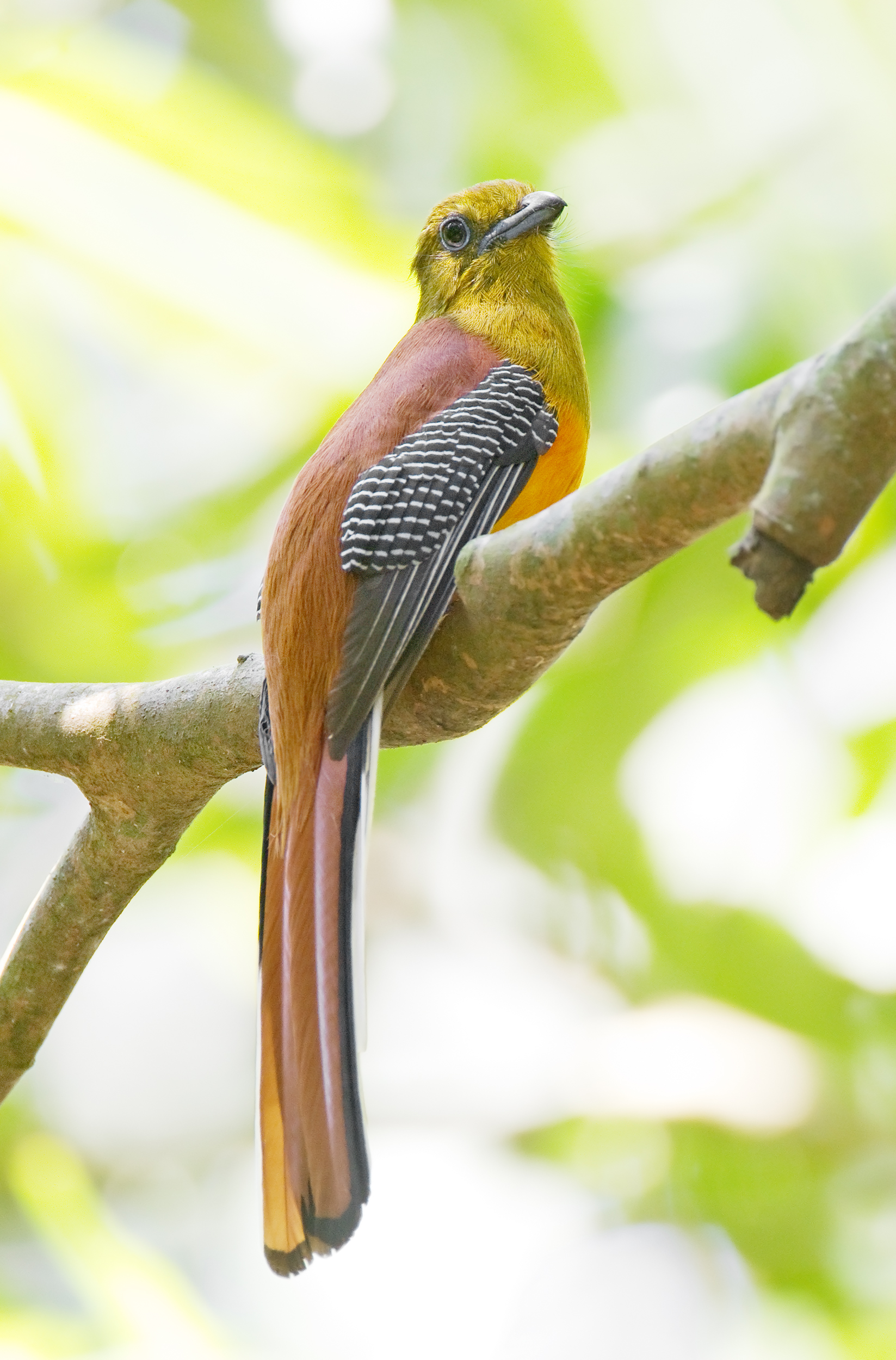
Orange-breasted trogon

=== Non-passerine ===
60 species of non-passerine from 22 families, represented by one species:

- Asian barred owlet
- Asian openbill
- Asian palm swift
- Chestnut-headed bee-eater
- Chinese pond-heron
- Crested treeswift
- Eastern barn owl
- Eurasian hoopoe
- Greater flameback
- Indochinese roller
- Lineated barbet
- Little cormorant
- Orange-breasted trogon
- Osprey
- Red junglefowl
- River lapwing
- Shikra
- Stork-billed kingfisher
- Vernal hanging-parrot
- Violet cuckoo
- Wreathed hornbill
- Zebra dove

== Reptiles ==
The sightings of reptiles in the park include the following species:

- Asian forest tortoise
- Barron's kukri snake
- Bengal monitor
- Bronze Grass Skink
- Common house gecko
- Elongated tortoise
- Forest garden lizard
- Malayan pit viper
- Mock viper
- Oriental garden lizard
- Pope's pit viper
- Red-necked keelback
- Reticulated python
- Spotted forest skink
- Water monitor

== Amphibians ==
The sightings of amphibians in the park include the following species:

- Banded bullfrog
- Berdmore's chorus frog
- Dark-sided chorus frog
- Indochinese dwarf toad
- Giant Asian River Frog
- Green mountain frog
- Lesser toad
- Rice field frog
- Tree frog

== Fishes ==
The sightings of fishes in the park include the following species:

- Clown featherback
- Garras
- Giant snakehead fish
- Greater Brook Carp
- Hampala
- Spiny eel
- Nibble fish
- Yellow mystus

== Attractions ==
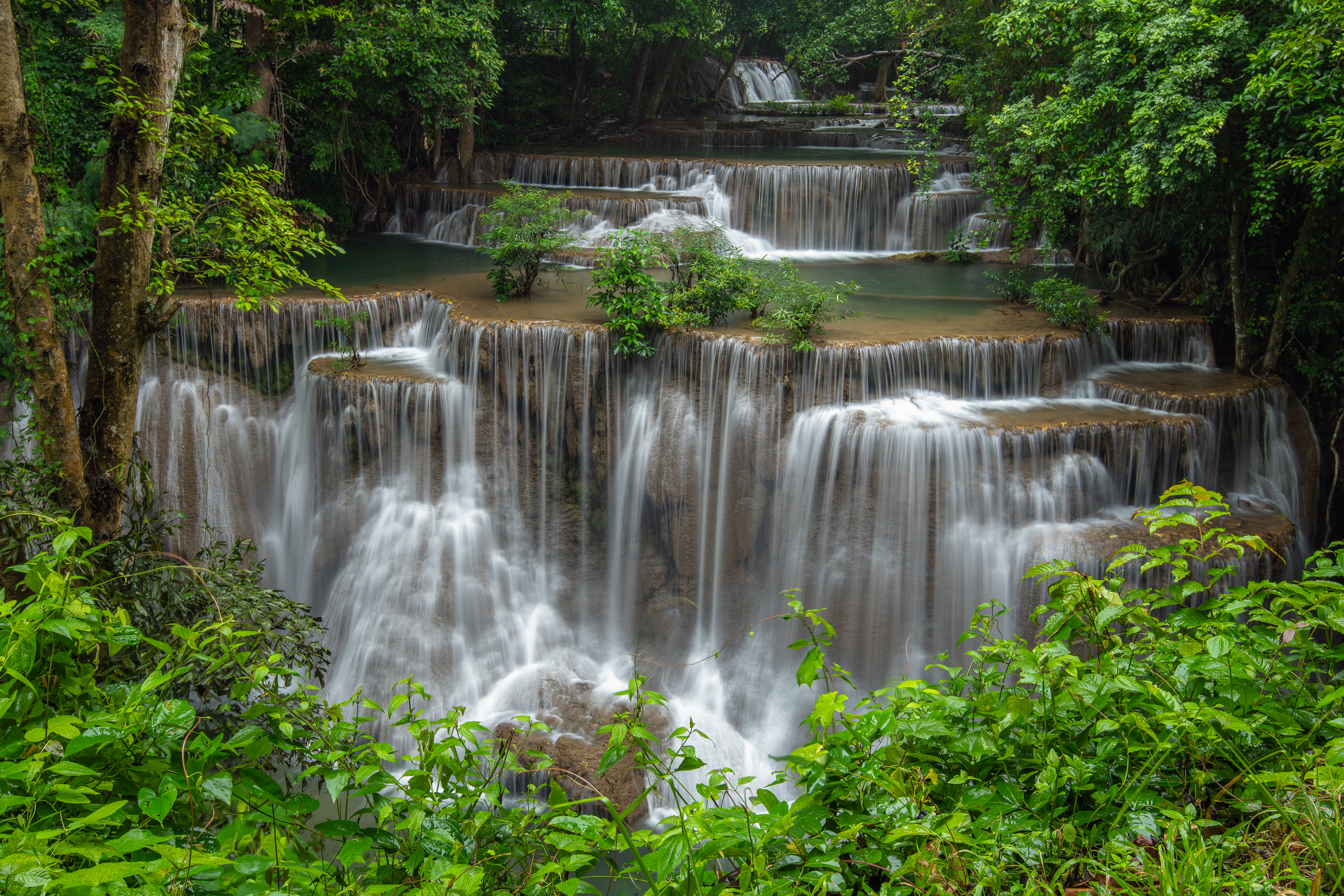
Huai Mae Khamin Waterfall

Khuean Srinagarindra's most popular attraction is Huai Mae Khamin Waterfall, a waterfall of seven levels which eventually flows to the Khwae Yai River. The waterfall's source is in the mountains in the east of the park. Other park waterfalls include Pha Sawan and Pha Tat.

The park contains numerous cave systems. The 150 metres (490 ft) long Tham Sawan features prehistoric cave paintings. Tham Neramit is dome-like in appearance and features stalactites and stalagmites. Tham Phra Prang, also featuring stalactites and stalagmites, hosts a Buddha image inside. Other caves include Tham Nam Mut and Tham Phra Kho.

== Location ==
Khuean Srinagarindra National Park in overview PARO 3 (Ban Pong)

5) Khuean Srinagarindra National Park in overview PARO 3 (Ban Pong)

| | National park |
| 1 | Thai Prachan |
| 2 | Chaloem Rattanakosin |
| 3 | Erawan |
| 4 | Khao Laem |
| 5 | Khuean Srinagarindra |
| 6 | Lam Khlong Ngu |
| 7 | Phu Toei |
| 8 | Sai Yok |
| 9 | Thong Pha Phum |

| | Wildlife sanctuary |
| 10 | Mae Nam Phachi |
| 11 | Salak Phra |
| 12 | Thung Yai Naresuan West |
| | Forest park |
| 22 | Phra Thaen Dong Rang |
| 23 | Phu Muang |
| 24 | Tham Khao Noi |

| | Non-hunting area |
| 13 | Bueng Kroengkawia– Nong Nam Sap |
| 14 | Bueng Chawak |
| 15 | Khao Pratap Chang |
| 16 | Phantai Norasing |
| 17 | Somdet Phra Srinagarindra |
| 18 | Tham Khang Khao– Khao Chong Phran |
| 19 | Tham Lawa– Tham Daowadueng |
| 20 | Wat Rat Sattha Kayaram |
| 21 | Wat Tham Rakhang– Khao Phra Non |

== See also ==
- IUCN protected area categories
- Western Forest Complex
- List of national parks of Thailand
- DNP - Khuean Srinagarindra National Park
- PARO 3 (Ban Pong)
