= Chang Phueak =

Chang phueak is a Thai term meaning white elephant (animal).

Chang Phueak, as a proper name, may refer to:

- Chang Phueak, Chiang Mai, a town and subdistrict which forms a suburb of the city of Chiang Mai, Thailand
- Chang Phueak Subdistrict in Chanae District, Narathiwat, Thailand
- Chang Phueak Subdistrict in Suwannaphum District, Roi Et, Thailand
- Khao Chang Phueak, a mountain in Kanchanaburi Province, Thailand
