= Tha Khanun =

Tha Khanun ท่าขนุน
- Subdistrict
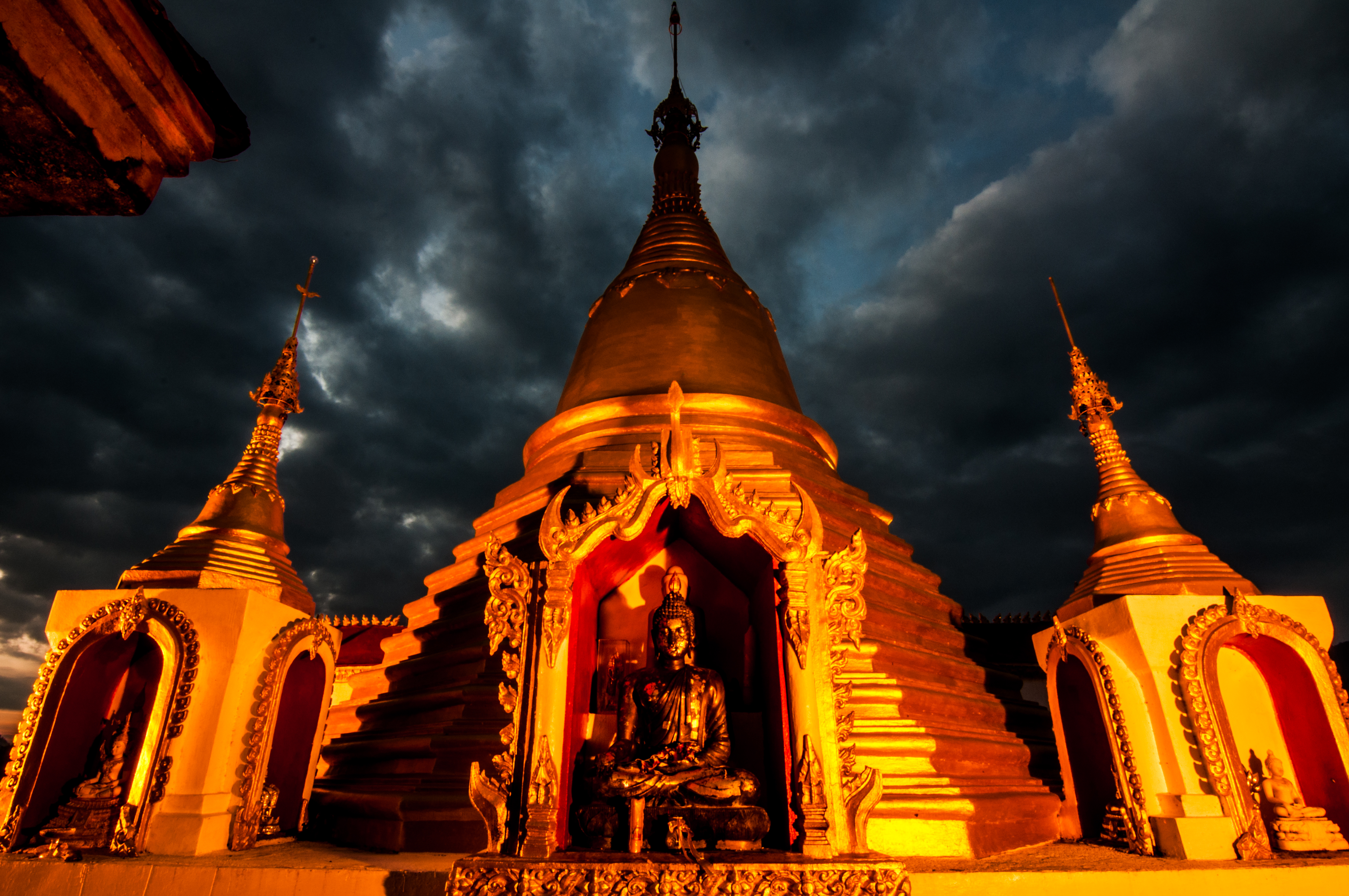
- Wat Tha Khanun

- Location in Thailand
- Coordinates: 14.7382°N 98.6320°E
- Country: Thailand
- Province: Kanchanaburi Province
- District: Thong Pha Phum

Population (2014)
  - Total: 14,141
- Time zone: UTC+7 (ICT)

Tha Khanun (Thai: ท่าขนุน) is a subdistrict (tambon) of Thong Pha Phum district of the Kanchanaburi Province, Thailand. It is named after the Jackfruit tree, and is located on the Khwae Noi River. Lam Khlong Ngu National Park and Wat Tha Khanun, a large Buddhist temple, are located near the subdistrict.

== History ==
Tha Khanun was a river harbour town on the Khwae Noi River. In 1786, Rama I landed his troops in Tha Khanun from Bangkok to fight the Burmese–Siamese War. During the 20th century, an important part of the economy was wolfram mining in the nearby mountains. Before the construction of roads, ore was transported by elephants from the mines to the harbour of Tha Khanun, and shipped by boat to Kanchanaburi.

During World War II, it was the location of three prisoner of war camps along the Burma Railway, and was described as a large town with shops, a police station, and many fruit trees. Lam Khlong Ngu National Park is located in the subdistrict and is known for its caves. In 1986, the Vajiralongkorn Dam was constructed on the Khwae Noi River near the town.

Wat Tha Khanun is a large Buddhist temple with a golden stupa. It is located on top of a mountain overlooking the town and the river. The temple can be reached via a 285 step staircase from the south side of the mountain.

=== Camp Takanun ===
Camp Takanun were three Japanese prisoner of war camps constructed during World War II. The first prisoners arrived in October 1942. The camps were reasonable at first, however there was a cholera outbreak in Camp 206 which caused 180 deaths in one month. While cholera ravaged the prisoners of war, thousands of conscripted Asian workers were brought into Takanun. The camps were abandoned in March 1944.
