= Khao Laem National Park =

National park in Thailand

- IUCN category II (national park)
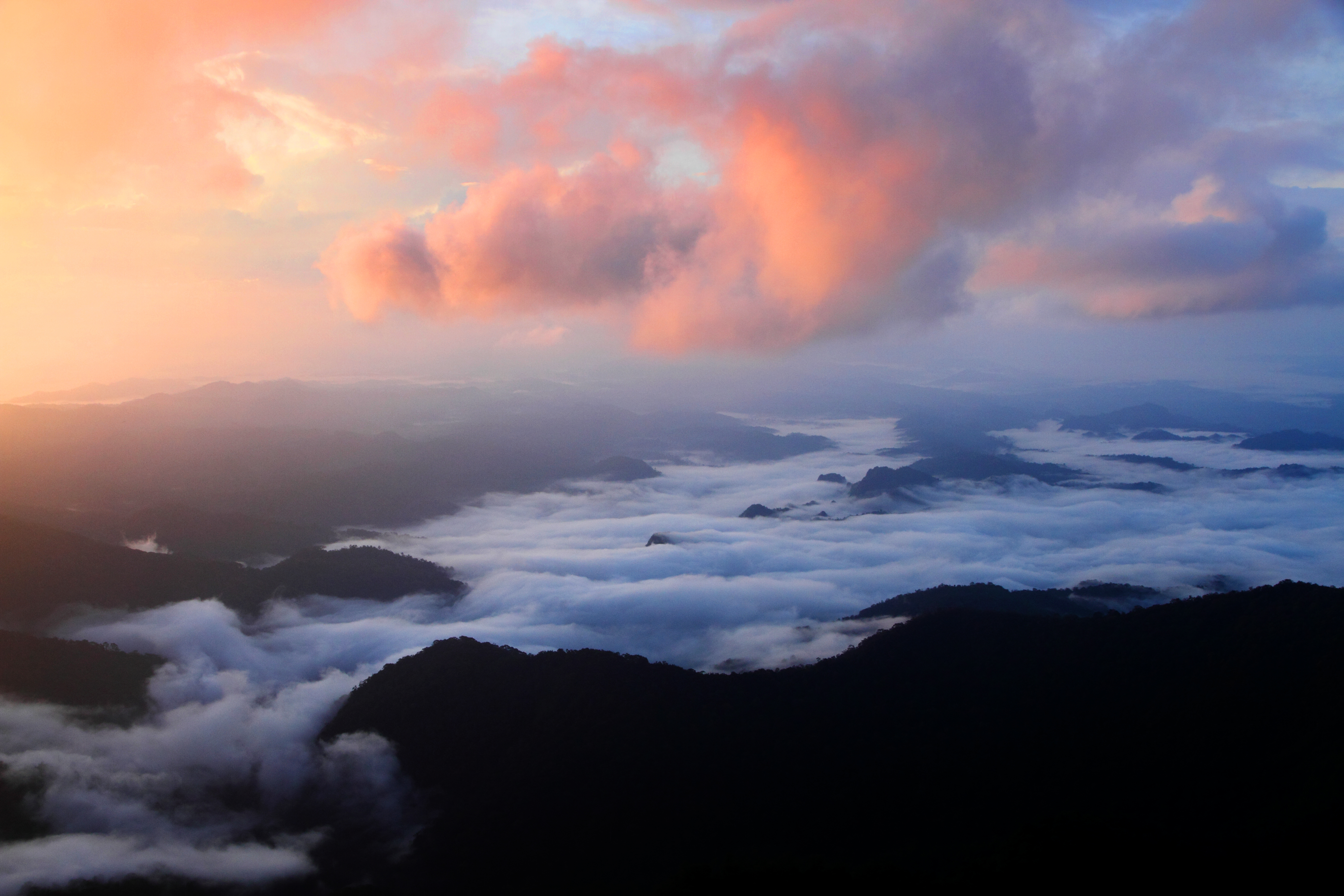
- Khao Laem Sea of Mist

- Location within Thailand
- Location: Kanchanaburi province, Thailand
- Nearest city: Sangkhlaburi
- Coordinates: 15°01′20″N 98°35′50″E
- Area: 1,497 km^{2} (578 sq mi)
- Established: 5 December 1991
- Visitors: 48,599 (in 2024)
- Governing body: Department of National Parks, Wildlife and Plant Conservation

Khao Laem National Park is a park of about 1,500 squaere kilometer (580 sq mi) in Western Thailand, located near Myanmar in the northern area of the Tenasserim Hills, Kanchanaburi Province. It is a part of the Western Forest Complex, a system of protected wilderness in the Dawna-Tenasserim Hills area of western Thailand. The park hosted the second season of New Zealand version of Survivor, Survivor NZ: Thailand.

== Geography ==
The area of the park is 935,584 rai ~ 1,497 square kilometres (578 sq mi) with steeply limestone mountain run on north–south axis. The park, which is adjacent to the Thungyai Naresuan Wildlife Sanctuary, Lam Khlong Ngu National Park and Thong Pha Phum National Park, located about 340 km northwest of Bangkok, surrounds the Khao Laem Reservoir wih a water surface of 388 square kilometres (150 sq mi), or 26% of the park. It is bisected by Road 323.

The limestone mountains of the Tenasserim Range rise from 100 to 1,800 meters high with Khao Khiao-Khao Yai as the highest summit at 1,767 meters (5,800 ft). Many streams flowing into Khwae Noi River and Vajiralongkorn Reservoir.

== History ==
The establishment of the national park was declared the 67th national park in the Royal Gazette on 8 November 1991 and came into effect 5 December the same year. This park area was further modified in the years 2002 and 2009.

== Climate ==
The area is in a tropical climate, influenced by monsoons, southeasterly winds and the Andaman Sea breezes. The region's annual weather patterns are divided into three main seasonal periods:

1. Rainy season (mid-May to October): the heaviest rainfall in July and August.
2. Cold season (November to February): the lowest average temperature is 14 °C (57 °F).
3. Summer (March to mid-May): the maximun average temperature is 38 °C (100 °F), in April.

== Flora ==
The vegetation in the east and west of the park is mixed deciduous forest:

- Aporosa villosa
- Caryota urens
- Croton persimilis
- Ironwood
- Ixora cibdela
- Lagerstroemia loudonii
- Microcos paniculata
- Parkia sumatrana
- Phoebe (plant)
- Senegalia pennata
- Stereospermum fimbratum
- Syzygium cumini
- Terminalia bellirica
- Vitex peduncularis

== Fauna ==
=== Mammals ===
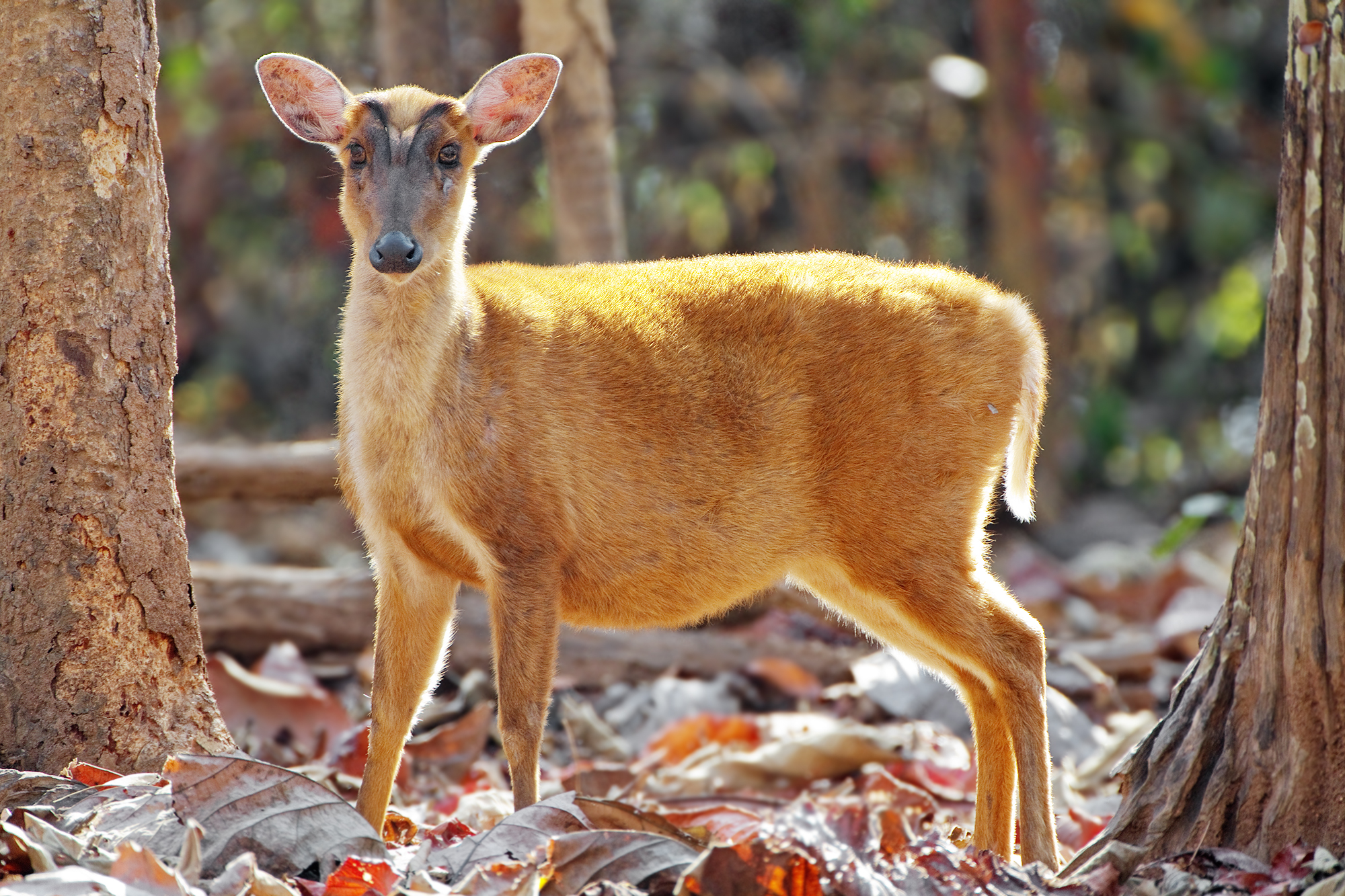
Barking deer (Muntiacus spp.)

There have been sightings in the park of ten species of mammals:

- Asian palm civet
- Asian small-clawed otter
- Black giant squirrel
- Dawn bat
- Greater short-nosed fruit bat
- Grey-bellied squirrel
- Indochinese Ground Squirrel
- Lar gibbon
- Long-tongued fruit bat
- Muntjac

=== Birds ===
The park has some 249 species of birds from 67 families.

==== Passerine ====
145 species of passerine from 37 families, represented by one species:

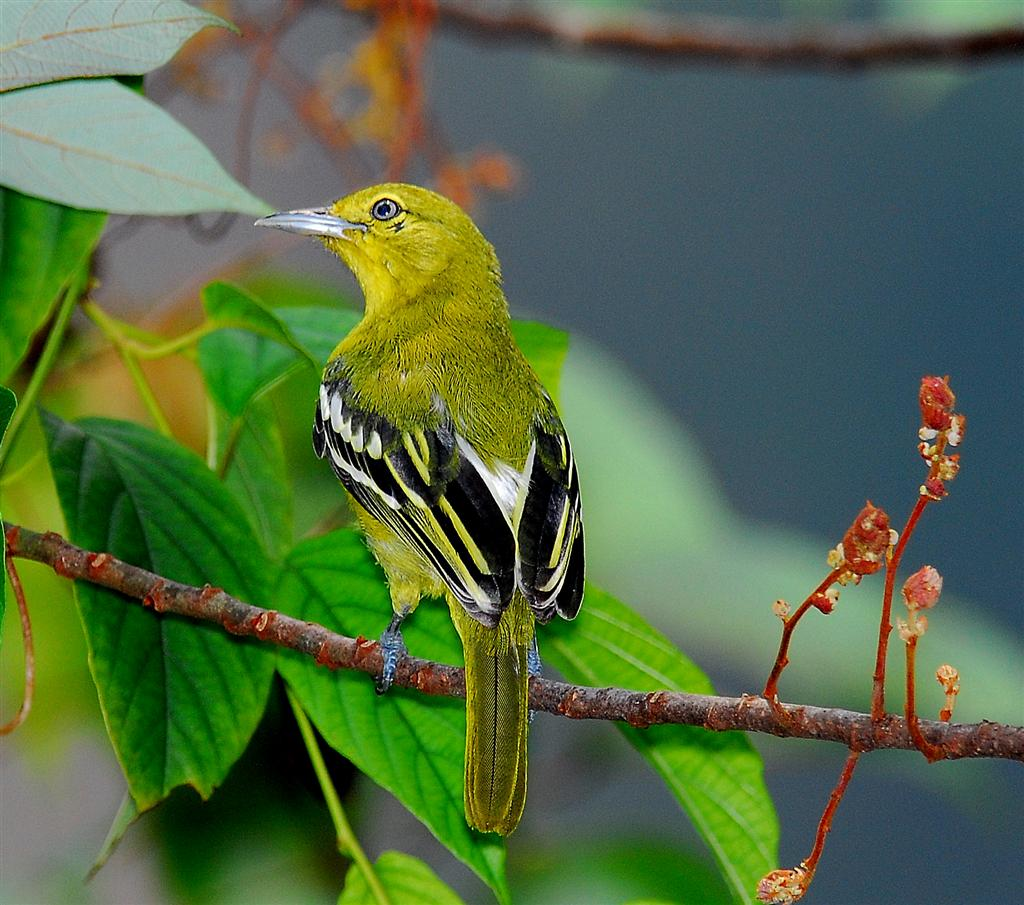
Common iora (Aegithina tiphia)

- Ashy woodswallow
- Asian fairy-bluebird
- Black-naped monarch
- Black-naped oriole
- Blue pitta
- Chestnut-flanked white-eye
- Common green-magpie
- Common hill myna
- Common iora
- Common rosefinch
- Eastern red-rumped swallow
- Eurasian tree sparrow
- Eyebrowed thrush
- Gray-headed canary-flycatcher
- Gray wagtail
- Greater green leafbird
- Indochinese cuckooshrike
- Lesser necklaced laughingthrush
- Long-tailed broadbill
- Malaysian pied-fantail
- Maroon-breasted philentoma
- Olive bulbul
- Oriental magpie-robin
- Ornate sunbird
- Puff-throated babbler
- Rufescent prinia
- Scaly-breasted munia
- Scarlet-backed flowerpecker
- Short-tailed drongo
- Spot-necked babbler
- Sultan tit
- Thick-billed warbler
- Tiger shrike
- Velvet-fronted nuthatch
- White-bellied erpornis
- Yellow-bellied warbler
- Yellow-browed warbler

==== Non-passerine ====
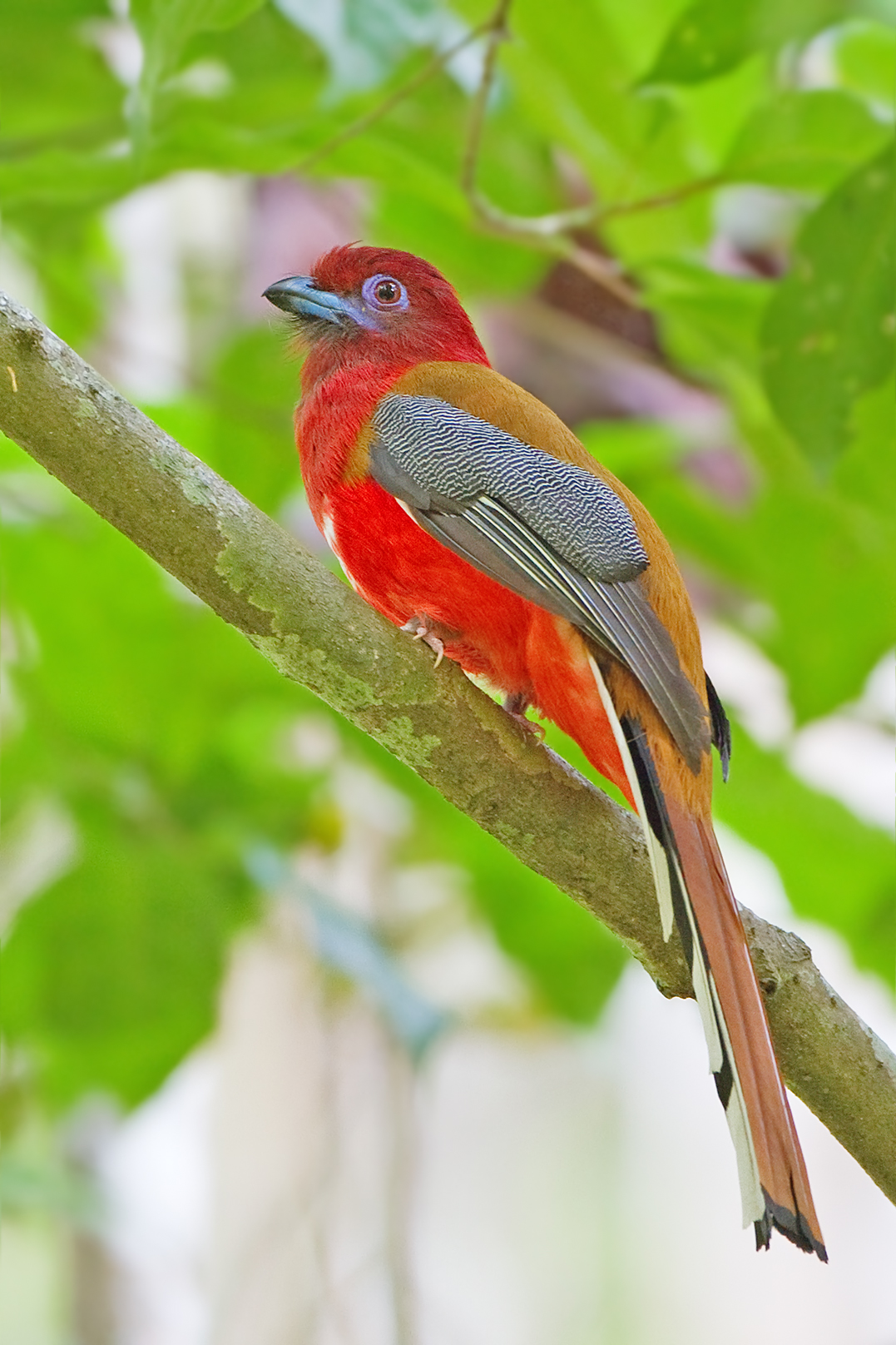
Red-headed trogon (Harpactes erythrocephalus)

107 species of non-passerine from 30 families, represented by one species:

- Asian openbill
- Black-winged stilt
- Chestnut-headed bee-eater
- Chinese pond-heron
- Common sandpiper
- Crested treeswift
- Eastern barn owl
- Eurasian hoopoe
- Great eared-nightjar
- Greater coucal
- Great hornbill
- Himalayan swiftlet
- Indochinese roller
- Japanese sparrowhawk
- Lesser whistling-duck
- Lineated barbet
- Little cormorant
- Little grebe
- mountain scops-owl
- Orange-breasted green-pigeon
- Oriental darter
- Osprey
- Peregrine falcon
- Red-headed trogon
- Red junglefowl
- Red-wattled lapwing
- Rufous woodpecker
- Stork-billed kingfisher
- Vernal hanging-parrot
- White-breasted waterhen

=== Reptiles ===
There have been sightings in the park of eight species of reptiles:

- Banded krait
- Bronze Grass Skink
- Forest garden lizard
- Orange-winged flying lizard
- Oriental garden lizard
- Red-necked keelback
- Spotted forest skink
- Tokay gecko

=== Amphibians ===
There have been sightings in the park of ten species of amphibians:

- Asian common toad
- Banded bullfrog
- Dark-sided chorus frog
- Green paddy frog
- Mottled bush frog
- Ornate chorus frog
- Ornate narrow-mouthed frog
- Rice field frog
- Taiwan rice frog
- Twin-spotted bush frog

=== Fishes ===
There have been sightings in the park of thirteen species of fish:

- Bagrid catfish
- Beardless barb
- Black-spot longtom
- Bronze featherback
- Discherodontus halei
- Giant snakehead
- Hillstream loach
- Oxygaster anomalura
- scissortail rasbora
- Siamese algae-eater
- Siamese mud carp
- Siamese rock catfish
- Silver loach

== Attractions ==
* Namtok Kra Teng Jeng	a waterfall with 23 levels over 2 km.
* Namtok Kroeng Kra Wai	a 5 meter high waterfall.
* Namtok Pha Tak	a 5 tiered waterfall.

== Location ==
Khao Laem National Park in overview PARO 3 (Ban Pong)

4) Khao Laem National Park in overview PARO 3 (Ban Pong)

	National park
1	Thai Prachan
2	Chaloem Rattanakosin
3	Erawan
4	Khao Laem
5	Khuean Srinagarindra
6	Lam Khlong Ngu
7	Phu Toei
8	Sai Yok
9	Thong Pha Phum

	Wildlife sanctuary
10	Mae Nam Phachi
11	Salak Phra
12	Thung Yai Naresuan West
	Forest park
22	Phra Thaen Dong Rang
23	Phu Muang
24	Tham Khao Noi

	Non-hunting area
13	Bueng Kroengkawia– Nong Nam Sap
14	Bueng Chawak
15	Khao Pratap Chang
16	Phantai Norasing
17	Somdet Phra Srinagarindra
18	Tham Khang Khao– Khao Chong Phran
19	Tham Lawa– Tham Daowadueng
20	Wat Rat Sattha Kayaram
21	Wat Tham Rakhang– Khao Phra Non

== See also ==
- IUCN protected area categories
- Map of Khao Laem National Park
- Western Forest Complex
- List of national parks of Thailand
- DNP - Khao Laem National Park
- PARO 3 (Ban Pong)
