= Thong Pha Phum district =

Thong Pha Phum ทองผาภูมิ
- District
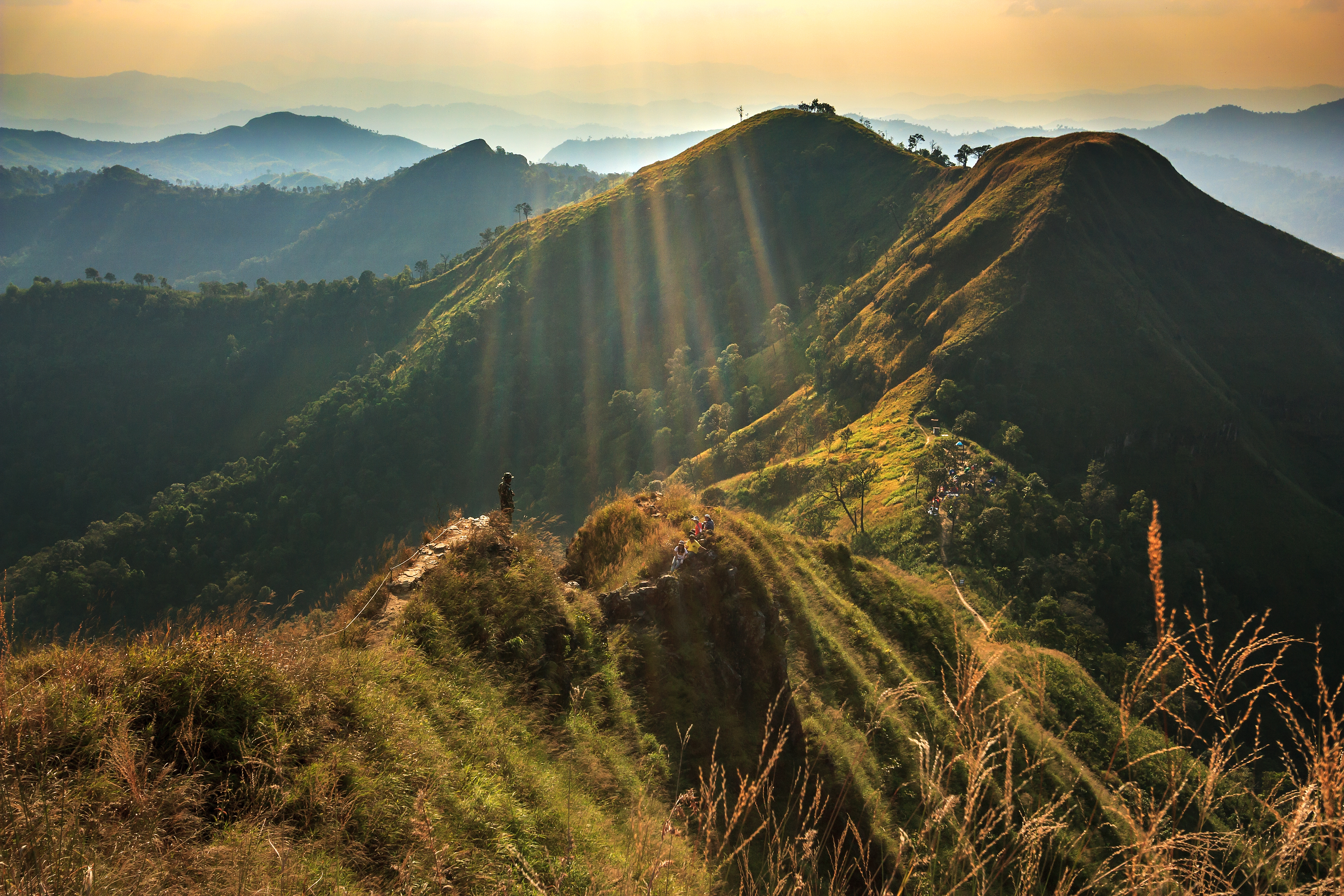
- Thong Pha Phum National Park

- District location in Kanchanaburi province
- Coordinates: 14°44′45″N 98°37′30″E
- Country: Thailand
- Province: Kanchanaburi
- Seat: Tha Khanun

Area
  - Total: 3,655 km^{2} (1,411 sq mi)

Population (2024)
  - Total: 71,315
  - Density: 20/km^{2} (52/sq mi)
- Time zone: UTC+7 (ICT)
- Postal code: 71180
- Calling code: 034
- ISO 3166 code: TH-7107

Thong Pha Phum (Thai: ทองผาภูมิ, pronounced [tʰɔ̄ːŋ pʰǎː pʰūːm]) is a district (amphoe) in the northern part of Kanchanaburi province, central Thailand and is located west of Bangkok.

== History ==
At first Thong Pha Phum was the minor district (king amphoe) Sangkhla Buri, a subordinate of Wang Ka District. In 1939 the name Sangkhla Buri was assigned to Wang Ka, while the minor district was renamed Thong Pha Phum. On 20 May 1941 it was upgraded to a full district, while at the same time Sangkhla Buri was reduced to a minor district. It then consisted of the six tambons Tha Khanun, Hin Dat, Dika, Chalae, Pilok, and Linthin.

== Geography ==
Neighboring are (from west clockwise) Tanintharyi Division of Myanmar, Sangkhla Buri of Kanchanaburi province, Umphang of Tak province, Ban Rai of Uthai Thani province, Si Sawat and Sai Yok of Kanchanaburi province.

The district's important water resource is the Khwae Noi River, which is dammed by the district's Vajiralongkorn Dam.

Thong Pha Phum, Lam Khlong Ngu, Khuean Srinagarindra, and Khao Laem National Parks are found in the district.

=== Environment ===
The economy includes the 460 million baht cleanup of the lead tailings in Klity Creek, caused by a now-closed lead processing factory; the cleanup is "the first state-supervised environmental cleanup in Thailand". The Bo Ngam lead mine severely contaminated the soil, where the lead content was as high at 15%. Despite this, 48 species of plants were found growing in the area, suggesting possible bioremediation.

=== Climate ===
Thong Pha Phum district has a tropical savanna climate (Köppen climate classification Aw). Winters are dry and very warm. Temperatures rise until April, which is very hot with the average daily maximum at 37.8 °C (100.0 °F). The monsoon season runs from May through October, with heavy rain and somewhat cooler temparatures during the day, although nights remain warm.

Climate data for Thong Pha Phum (1991–2020, extremes 1970-present)
Month	Jan	Feb	Mar	Apr	May	Jun	Jul	Aug	Sep	Oct	Nov	Dec	Year
Record high °C (°F)	37.3 (99.1)	39.2 (102.6)	41.3 (106.3)	43.0 (109.4)	42.3 (108.1)	38.0 (100.4)	36.5 (97.7)	36.2 (97.2)	35.7 (96.3)	36.0 (96.8)	37.3 (99.1)	39.2 (102.6)	43.0 (109.4)
Mean daily maximum °C (°F)	33.6 (92.5)	35.7 (96.3)	37.4 (99.3)	37.8 (100.0)	34.8 (94.6)	32.4 (90.3)	31.3 (88.3)	31.1 (88.0)	32.3 (90.1)	33.0 (91.4)	32.9 (91.2)	32.5 (90.5)	33.7 (92.7)
Daily mean °C (°F)	24.9 (76.8)	26.9 (80.4)	29.0 (84.2)	29.9 (85.8)	28.5 (83.3)	27.3 (81.1)	26.7 (80.1)	26.5 (79.7)	26.8 (80.2)	26.8 (80.2)	25.8 (78.4)	24.3 (75.7)	27.0 (80.5)
Mean daily minimum °C (°F)	17.5 (63.5)	18.9 (66.0)	21.2 (70.2)	23.1 (73.6)	24.0 (75.2)	23.8 (74.8)	23.4 (74.1)	23.2 (73.8)	23.2 (73.8)	22.4 (72.3)	20.1 (68.2)	17.6 (63.7)	21.5 (70.8)
Record low °C (°F)	5.4 (41.7)	8.1 (46.6)	11.5 (52.7)	15.0 (59.0)	17.0 (62.6)	19.5 (67.1)	20.0 (68.0)	19.5 (67.1)	19.2 (66.6)	13.9 (57.0)	9.4 (48.9)	5.2 (41.4)	5.2 (41.4)
Average precipitation mm (inches)	7.2 (0.28)	11.5 (0.45)	53.2 (2.09)	94.8 (3.73)	206.5 (8.13)	249.6 (9.83)	353.3 (13.91)	344.9 (13.58)	250.6 (9.87)	164.1 (6.46)	20.7 (0.81)	5.4 (0.21)	1,761.8 (69.36)
Average precipitation days (≥ 1.0 mm)	0.7	1.2	3.9	6.7	15.6	20.8	23.9	24.2	20.2	13.0	2.1	0.6	132.9
Average relative humidity (%)	71.8	65.3	63.7	68.7	79.1	84.6	86.6	87.3	85.9	84.0	79.3	75.4	77.6
Mean monthly sunshine hours	279.0	262.7	275.9	276.0	155.0	114.0	58.9	58.9	54.0	145.7	219.0	279.0	2,178.1
Mean daily sunshine hours	9.0	9.3	8.9	9.2	5.0	3.8	1.9	1.9	1.8	4.7	7.3	9.0	6.0
Source 1: World Meteorological Organization
Source 2: Office of Water Management and Hydrology, Royal Irrigation Department (sun 1981–2010)(extremes)

== Administration ==
=== Provincial administration ===
The district is divided into seven subdistricts (tambons), which are further subdivided into 45 administrative villages (mubans).

No.	Subdistrict	Thai	Villages	Pop.
1.	Tha Khanun	ท่าขนุน	5	21,180
2.	Pilok	ปิล๊อก	4	6,155
3.	Hin Dat	หินดาด	8	6,182
4.	Linthin	ลิ่นถิ่น	7	8,595
5.	Chalae	ชะแล	7	11,923
6.	Huai Khayeng	ห้วยเขย่ง	8	11,601
7.	Sahakon Nikhon	สหกรณ์นิคม	6	5,679
		Total	45	71,315

=== Local government ===
==== Municipalities ====
As of December 2024 there are: four municipal (thesaban) areas in the district; these are subdistrict municipalities (thesaban tambons) of which Linthin and Sahakon Nikhon cover the whole subdistrict, Thong Pha Phum covers only village no.1 of Tha Kanun subdistrict and Tha Kanun covers the remaining of the same named subdistrict.

Subdistrict municipality	Pop.	LAO code	website
Tha Khanun	18,128	05710701	thakanun.go.th
Linthin	8,595	05710705	linthinkan.go.th
Sahakon Nikhon	5,679	05710703	sahakornnikom.go.th

Thong Pha Phum subdistrict mun.	Pop.	05710702	tpm.go.th
Tha Khanun	3,052		

==== Subdistrict administrative organizations ====
The non-municipal areas are administered by four subdistrict administrative organizations - SAO (ongkan borihan suan tambon - o bo toh).

Subdistrict adm.org - SAO	Pop.	LAO code	website
Chalae SAO	11,923	06710707	chalae.go.th
Huai Khayeng SAO	11,601	06710708	huaikhayeng-sao.go.th
Hin Dat SAO	6,182	06710706	
Pilok SAO	6,155	06710704	pilok.go.th

== Education ==
- 37 primary schools
- 4 secondary schools

== Healthcare ==
=== Hospital ===
Thong Pha Phum district is served by one hospital

- Thong Pha Phum Hospital with 95 beds.

=== Health promoting hospitals ===
In the district there are thirteen health-promoting hospitals in total.

1 Pilok	1 Sahakon Nikhom	2 Hin Dat	2 Huai Khayeng
2 Lithin	2 Tha Khanun	3 Chalae

== Religion ==
There are fifty-nine Theravada Buddhist temples in the district.

1 Pilok	4 Sahakon Nikhom	6 Huai Khayeng	8 Linthin
9 Chalae	10 Hin Dat	21 Tha Khanun

The Christians have twelve churches and muslims have two mosques.
