= Thong Pha Phum National Park =

National park of Thailand

- อุทยานแห่งชาติทองผาภูมิ
- IUCN category II (national park)
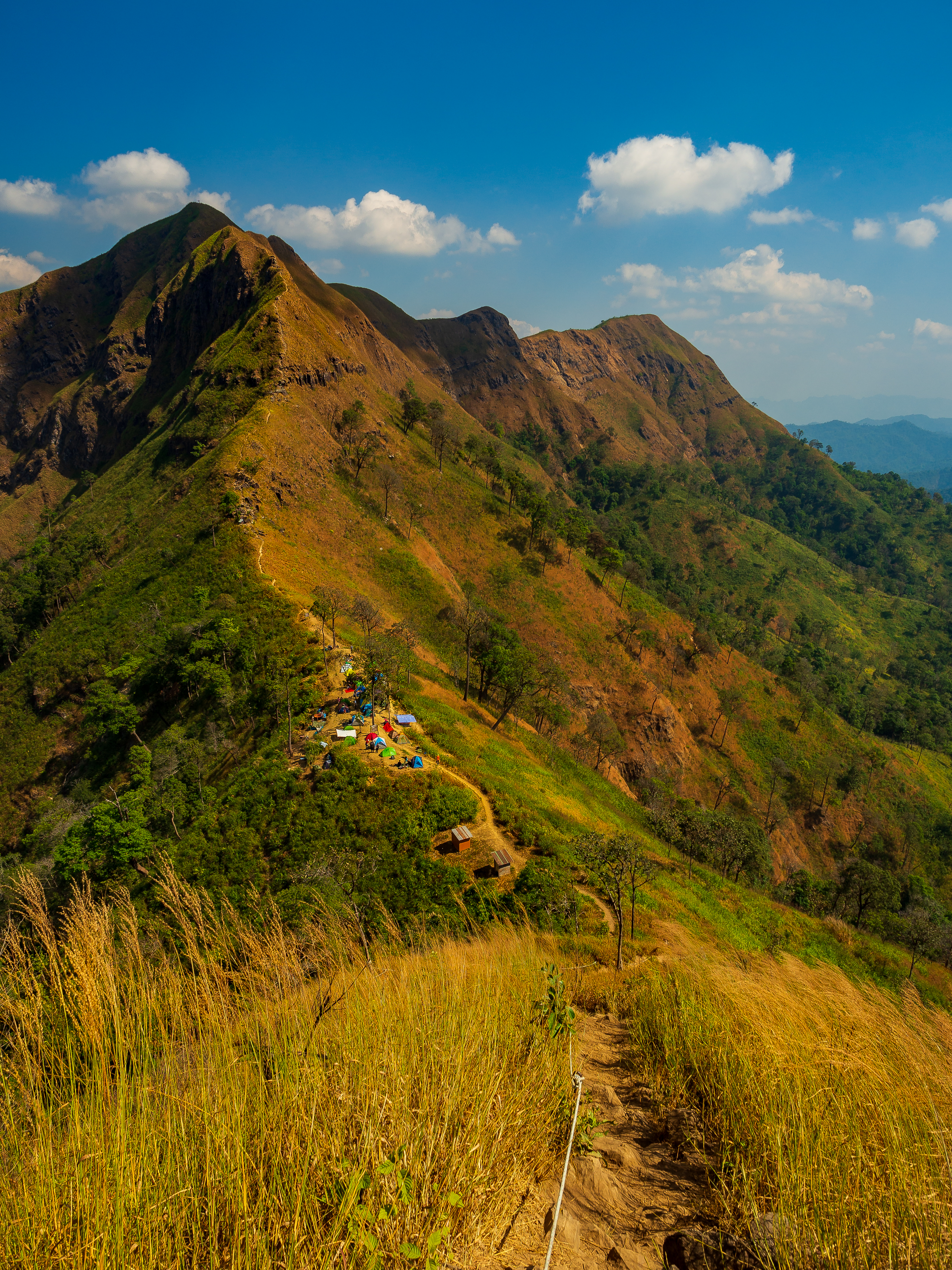
- Khao Chang Phueak, highest point in Kanchanaburi

- Location within Thailand
- Location: Kanchanaburi province, Thailand
- Nearest city: Kanchanaburi
- Coordinates: 14°41′34″N 98°24′13″E
- Area: 1,236 km^{2} (477 sq mi)
- Established: 23 December 2009
- Visitors: 123,285 (in 2024)
- Governing body: Department of National Parks, Wildlife and Plant Conservation

Thong Pha Phum National Park (Thai: อุทยานแห่งชาติทองผาภูมิ) is a national park in Kanchanaburi province, Thailand. The park, located on the border with Myanmar, is part of the Western Forest Complex protected area.

== Geography ==
Thong Pha Phum National Park is located about 175 kilometres (100 mi) northwest of Kanchanaburi town and 30 kilometres (20 mi) west of Thong Pha Phum, in Sangkhla Buri and Thong Pha Phum districts. The park's area is 772,214 rai ~ 1,236 square kilometres (477 sq mi) and neighboring (from north clockwise) Thung Yai Naresuan Wildlife Sanctuary, Khao Laem National Park, Sai Yok National Park and Tanintharyi Division of Myanmar.
High mountains in the Tenasserim Range include: Khao Cha Long, Khao Dang, Khao Lo Lo, Khao Nisa, Khao Pak Pratu, Khao Phu Thong, Khao Pra Nong Tho Khi and Khao Chang Phueak is with 1,249 metres (4,098 ft) the park's highest peak.
Streams such as: Huai Chet Mit, Huai Kop, Huai Malai, Huai Ong Phra, Huai Pak Khok, Huai Pi Khi and Huai San flowing into the eastern plains into Vajiralongkorn Dam.

== History ==
On 23 December 2009, Thong Pha Phum became Thailand's 114th National Park.
Since 2002 this national park has been managed by PARO 3 (Ban Pong).

== Climate ==
The climate is influenced by southeastern monsoon in rainy season and northeastern monsoon in winter. Summer is from February to April, rainy season runs from May to July and winter lasts from November to January.

== Flora ==
There are four types of forest, namely: Dry evergreen forest, Hill evergreen forest, Mixed deciduous forest and Tropical evergreen forest.

== Fauna ==
=== Mammals ===
The number of sightings in the park are 24 species of mammals, include:

- Asian black bear
- Asian elephant
- Asian palm civet
- Asian wild dog
- Bat
- Bear
- Burmese hare
- Chevrotain
- Civet
- Clouded leopard
- Fishing cat
- Flying squirrel
- House mouse
- Javan mongoose
- Langur
- Lar gibbon
- Macaque
- Mainland serow
- Malayan porcupine
- Muntjac
- Sambar deer
- Sunbear
- Tiger
- Wild boar

=== Birds ===
The park has some 149 species of birds from 51 families.

==== Passerine ====
96 species of passerine from 32 families, represented by one species:

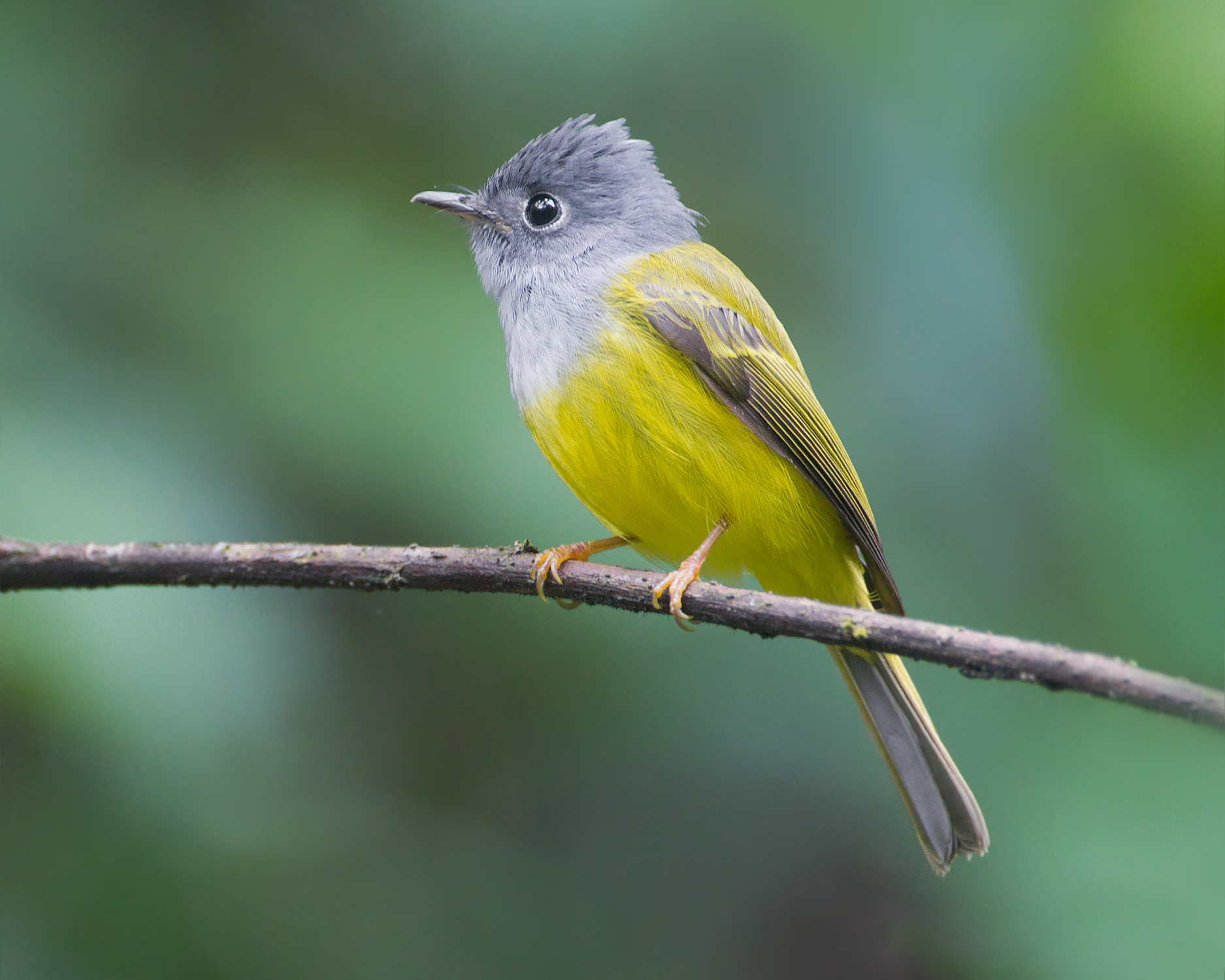
Grey-headed canary-flycatcher

- Ashy woodswallow
- Asian fairy-bluebird
- Barn swallow
- Black-naped monarch
- Black-naped oriole
- Blue pitta
- Blue-winged leafbird
- Brown shrike
- Common iora
- Dark-necked tailorbird
- Flavescent bulbul
- Grey-headed canary-flycatcher
- Gray treepie
- Great myna
- Green cochoa
- Large woodshrike
- Long-tailed broadbill
- Olive-backed pipit
- Oriental magpie-robin
- Ornate sunbird
- Puff-throated babbler
- Rufous-fronted babbler
- Scarlet minivet
- Short-tailed drongo
- Striated Yuhina
- Velvet-fronted nuthatch
- White-bellied erpornis
- White-crested laughingthrush
- White-rumped munia
- Yellow-bellied warbler
- Yellow-browed warbler
- Yellow-vented flowerpecker

==== Non-passerine ====
53 species of non-passerine from 19 families, represented by one species:

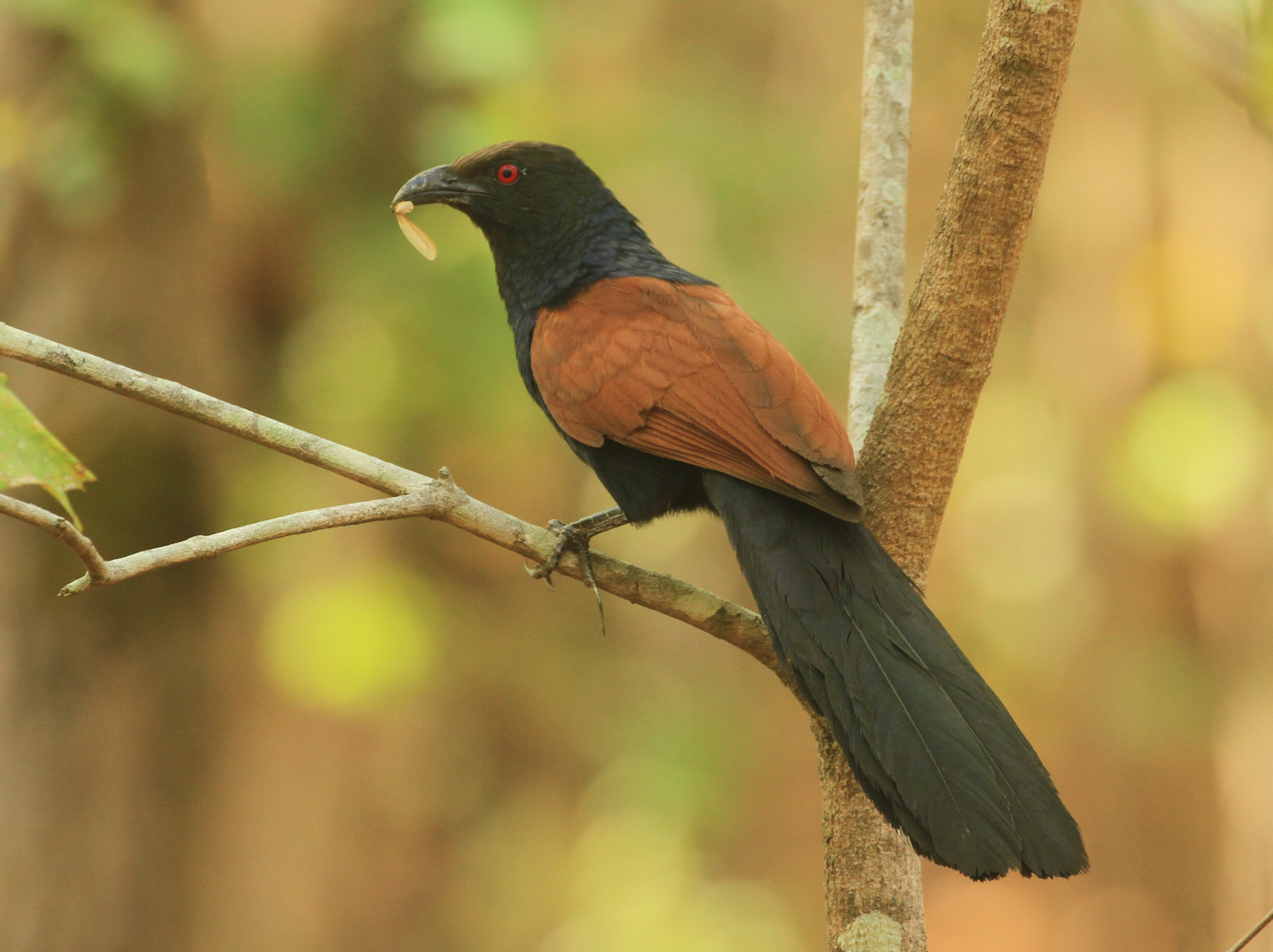
Greater coucal

- Asian openbill
- Bamboo woodpecker
- Black eagle
- Blue-throated barbet
- Chestnut-headed bee-eater
- Chinese pond-heron
- Common sandpiper
- Eastern barn owl
- Greater coucal
- Great hornbill
- Indochinese roller
- Little ringed plover
- Orange-breasted trogon
- Pacific swift
- Peregrine falcon
- Red-collared dove
- Red junglefowl
- Vernal hanging-parrot
- White-throated kingfisher

=== Reptiles ===
The number of sightings in the park are six species of reptiles, include:

- Asiatic softshell turtle
- Butterfly lizard
- Flying lizard
- Gecko
- Skink
- Tree lizard

=== Amphibians ===
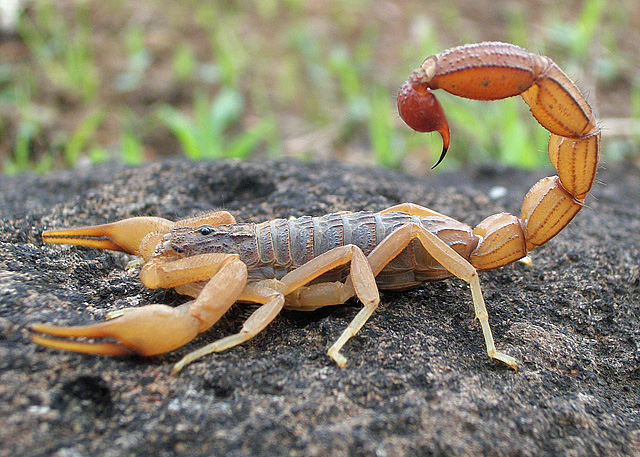
Scorpion

- Chubby frog
- Puddle frog
- Toad

=== Arachnids ===
- Scorpion

=== Fishes ===
The number of sightings in the park are nine species of fishes, include:

- Eel
- Climbing Perch
- Giant snakehead
- Java barb
- Minnow
- Mystus micracathus
- Red-tailed snakehead
- Striped snakehead
- Tor tambroides

== Attractions ==
The park has numerous waterfalls and caves. Chok Kradin waterfall descends 30 metres (100 ft) over a cliff. Another large waterfall is Khao Yai, with three levels. Other park waterfalls include Dip Yai, Bi Teng and Huai Meuang. Khao Noi cave houses Buddha images. Khao Khat viewpoint offers a panoramic view over the park.

== Location ==
Thong Pha Phum National Park in overview PARO 3 (Ban Pong)

9) Thong Pha Phum National Park in overview PARO 3 (Ban Pong)

| | National park |
| 1 | Thai Prachan |
| 2 | Chaloem Rattanakosin |
| 3 | Erawan |
| 4 | Khao Laem |
| 5 | Khuean Srinagarindra |
| 6 | Lam Khlong Ngu |
| 7 | Phu Toei |
| 8 | Sai Yok |
| 9 | Thong Pha Phum |

| | Wildlife sanctuary |
| 10 | Mae Nam Phachi |
| 11 | Salak Phra |
| 12 | Thung Yai Naresuan West |
| | Forest park |
| 22 | Phra Thaen Dong Rang |
| 23 | Phu Muang |
| 24 | Tham Khao Noi |

| | Non-hunting area |
| 13 | Bueng Kroengkawia– Nong Nam Sap |
| 14 | Bueng Chawak |
| 15 | Khao Pratap Chang |
| 16 | Phantai Norasing |
| 17 | Somdet Phra Srinagarindra |
| 18 | Tham Khang Khao– Khao Chong Phran |
| 19 | Tham Lawa– Tham Daowadueng |
| 20 | Wat Rat Sattha Kayaram |
| 21 | Wat Tham Rakhang– Khao Phra Non |

== See also ==
- IUCN protected area categories
- Western Forest Complex
- List of national parks of Thailand
- DNP - Thong Pha Phum National Park
- PARO 3 (Ban Pong)
