= Khao Chang Phueak =

Mountain in Thailand

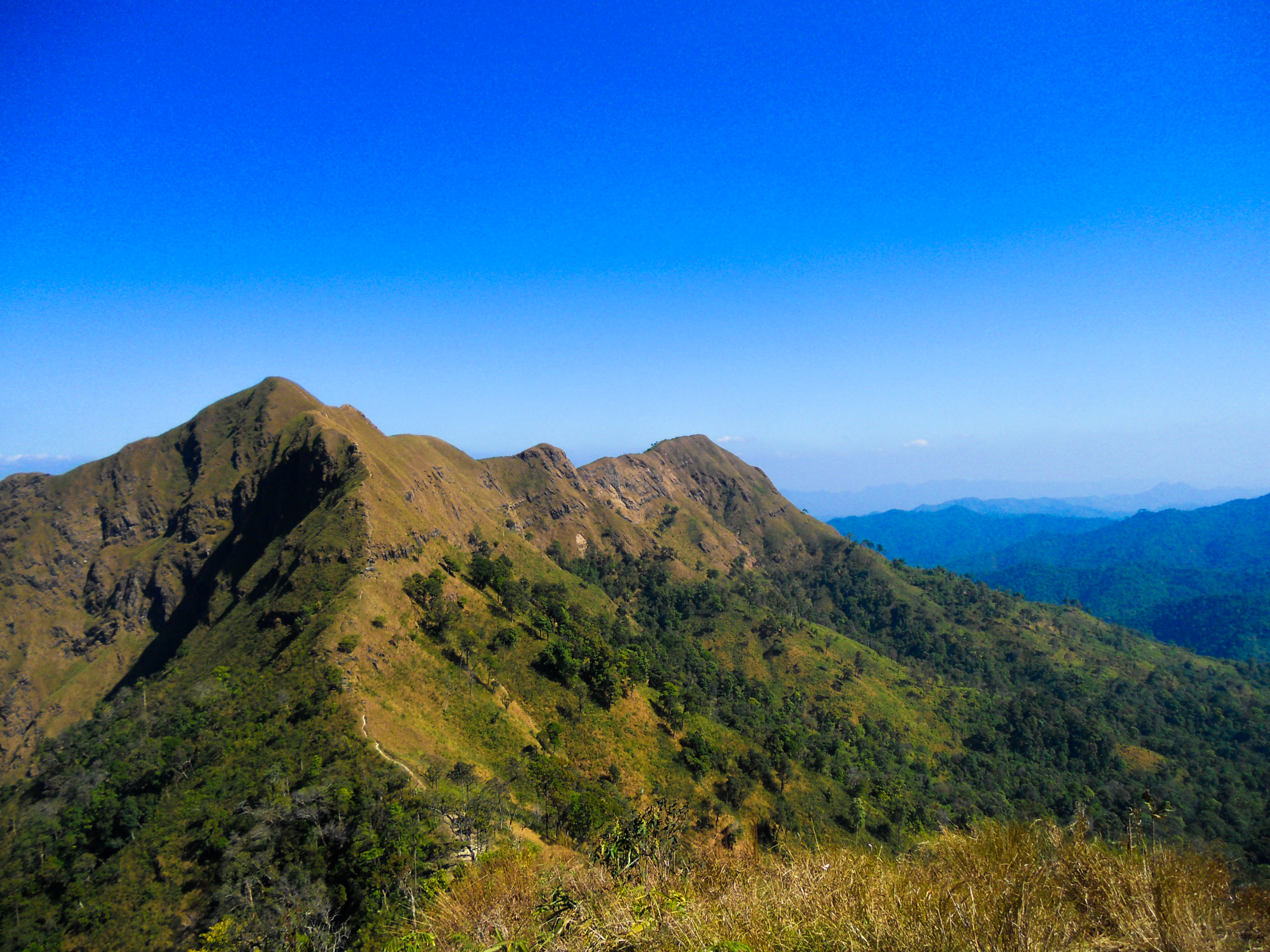

Highest point
- Elevation: 1,249 m (4,098 ft)
- Listing: List of mountains in Thailand
- Coordinates: 14°43′35″N 98°23′18″E

Geography
- Location within Thailand
- Location: Kanchanaburi, Thailand
- Parent range: Tenasserim Hills

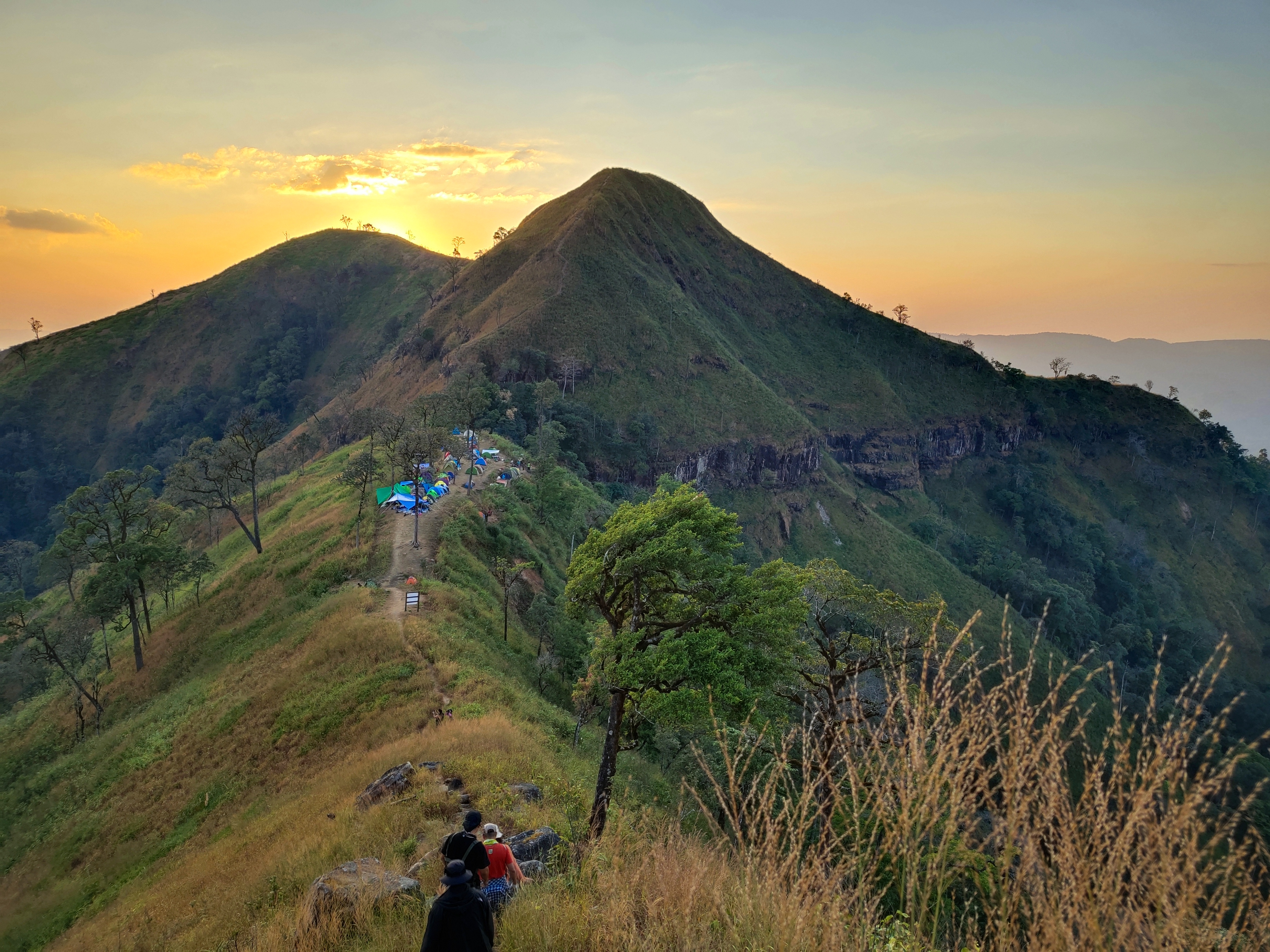
Twilight light at Khao Chang Phueak

Khao Chang Phueak is a mountain in Thailand's Thong Pha Phum National Park. It is in Pilok Subdistrict, Thong Pha Phum District, Kanchanaburi Province. Khao Chang Phueak is 1,249 meters (4,098 ft) in elevation and it is the third highest mountain in Kanchanaburi.

An eight-kilometer (5.0 mi) trail ascend to the mountain's summit. Visitors who intend to hike the trail must first register with Thong Pha Phum National Park officials, and the number of visitors to Khao Chang Phueak is limited to 60 persons per day.
