= Chaloem Rattanakosin National Park =

National park in Thailand

- อุทยานแห่งชาติเฉลิมรัตนโกสินทร์
- IUCN category II (national park)
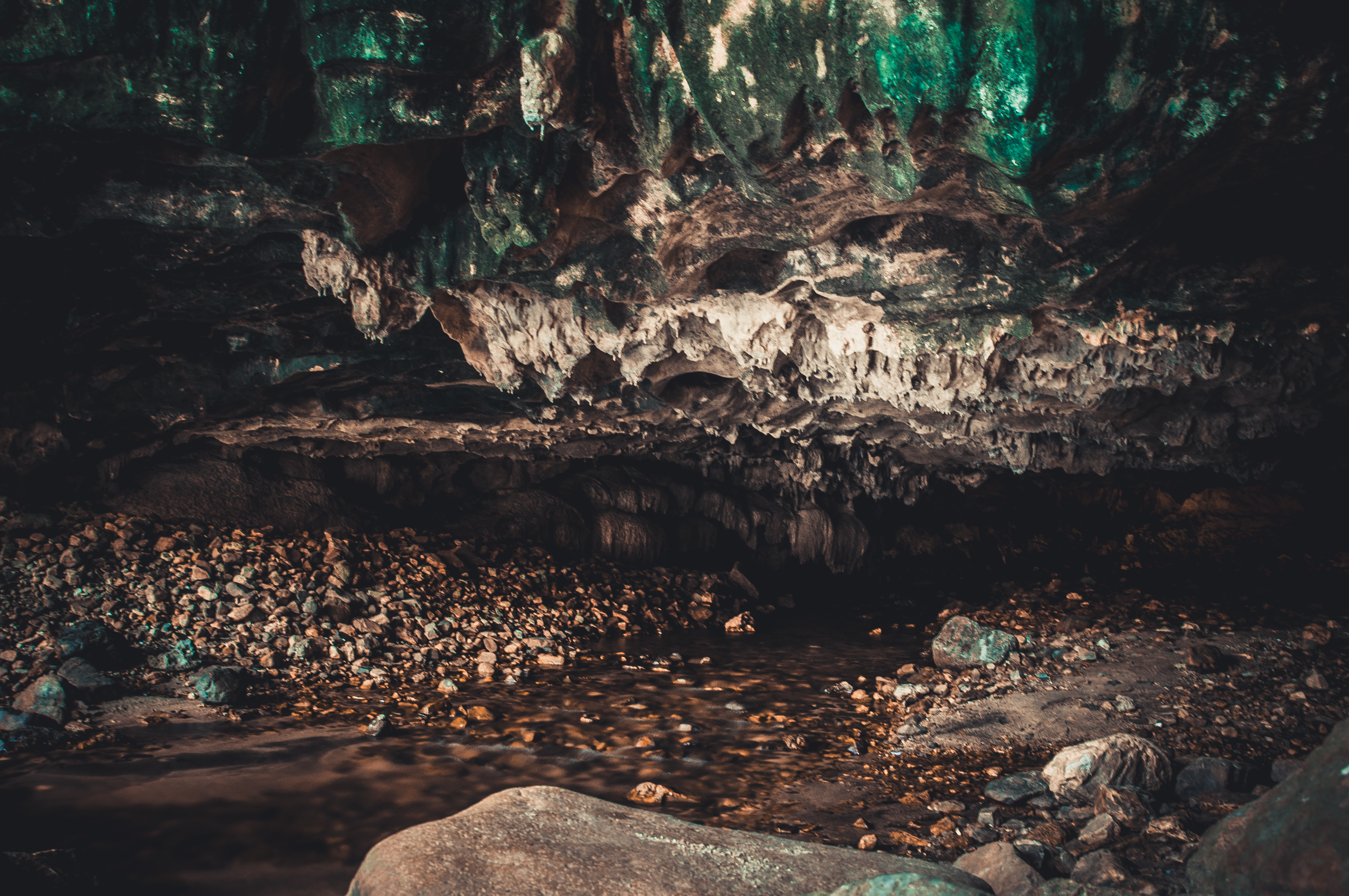
- Than Lot Noi Cave

- Location within Thailand
- Location: Kanchanaburi Province, Thailand
- Nearest city: Kanchanaburi
- Coordinates: 14°47′49″N 99°10′54″E
- Area: 59 km^{2} (23 sq mi)
- Established: February 1980
- Visitors: 31,536 (in 2019)
- Governing body: Department of National Parks, Wildlife and Plant Conservation

Chaloem Rattanakosin National Park (Thai: อุทยานแห่งชาติเฉลิมรัตนโกสินทร์), also known as Tham Than Lot National Park (อุทยานแห่งชาติถ้ำธารลอด), is a national park in Kanchanaburi Province, Thailand. The park, featuring mountains, caves and waterfalls, is part of the Western Forest Complex protected area.

== Geography ==
Chaloem Rattanakosin National Park is located 97 kilometres (60 mi) north of Kanchanaburi town in Nong Prue District. With an area of 36,875 rai ~ 59 square kilometres (23 sq mi), it is the smallest park in Kanchanaburi Province.

The highest peak of the park's mountains is Khao Kamphaeng with a height of 1,260 m (4,130 ft).

== History ==
Artefacts and human remains, thought to be from invading Burmese soldiers at end of the Ayutthaya Kingdom period, have been discovered in the park.

On 12 February 1980, Chaloem Rattanakosin was designated Thailand's 17th national park.

== Attractions ==
The park's main attractions are its cave systems. 300 metres (980 ft) long Tham Than Lot Noi features many large stalactites and stalagmites. Tham Than Lot Yai also features stalactites and stalagmites in addition to being a site where ancient skeletal remains and weapons have been found.

Chaloem Rattanakosin also features some waterfalls. Than Thong is a waterfall of 15 levels. Than Ngoen is a smaller waterfall of seven levels.

== Flora and fauna ==
The park's forests consist of dry evergreen, dipterocarp, deciduous and bamboo forest. Tree species include Pterocarpus macrocarpus, Afzelia xylocarpa, Hopea odorata and Dipterocarpus alatus.

Animal species include tiger, leopard, banteng, gaur and gibbon. Bird life includes oriental pied hornbill, francolin, Tickell's blue flycatcher and coppersmith barbet. A notable inhabitant of the park is a rare barking tree frog, whose croak resembles a dog's bark.

== Location ==
Chaloem Rattanakosin National Park in overview PARO 3 (Ban Pong)

2) Chaloem Rattanakosin National Park in overview PARO 3 (Ban Pong)

	National park
1	Thai Prachan
2	Chaloem Rattanakosin
3	Erawan
4	Khao Laem
5	Khuean Srinagarindra
6	Lam Khlong Ngu
7	Phu Toei
8	Sai Yok
9	Thong Pha Phum

	Wildlife sanctuary
10	Mae Nam Phachi
11	Salak Phra
12	Thung Yai Naresuan West
	Forest park
22	Phra Thaen Dong Rang
23	Phu Muang
24	Tham Khao Noi

	Non-hunting area
13	Bueng Kroengkawia– Nong Nam Sap
14	Bueng Chawak
15	Khao Pratap Chang
16	Phantai Norasing
17	Somdet Phra Srinagarindra
18	Tham Khang Khao– Khao Chong Phran
19	Tham Lawa– Tham Daowadueng
20	Wat Rat Sattha Kayaram
21	Wat Tham Rakhang– Khao Phra Non

== See also ==
- List of national parks of Thailand
- DNP - Chaloem Rattanakosin National Park
- List of Protected Areas Regional Offices of Thailand
