= Western Forest Complex =

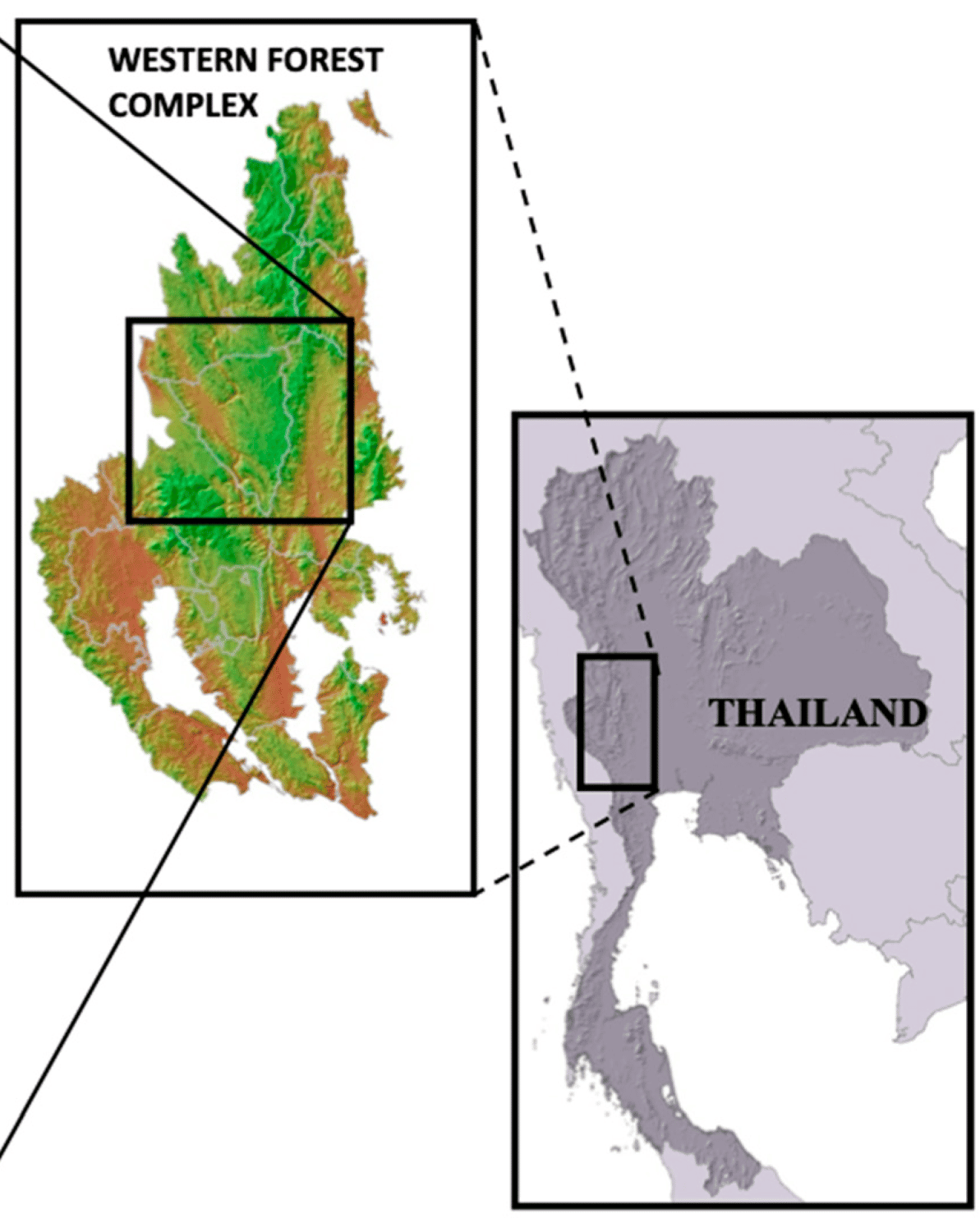
Area of the Western Forest Complex

The Western Forest Complex (WEFCOM) is a large natural conservation area in Thailand, located in the country's western region along its border with Myanmar. It covers 12 national parks and 7 wildlife sanctuaries, and serves as the main biodiversity conservation corridor of the region. Covering 18,730 km^{2}, it is one of the largest protected territories in Southeast Asia. The geography of the Western Forest Complex ranges from lowlands to the mountains of the Thai highlands and the Dawna-Tenasserim Hills.

Because of its large size, the complex supports a diversity of large mammals, including Indochinese tiger, Indochinese leopard, dhole, clouded leopard, sun bear, 10 species of primates (all five of the region's macaques), gaur, banteng, water buffalo, elephant, tapir, and four of Thailand's five deer species. Altogether 153 mammal species, 490 bird species, 41 reptiles, and 108 species of fish are confirmed in the area.

== Protected areas ==
- Salakphra Wildlife Sanctuary
- Huai Kha Khaeng Wildlife Sanctuary
- Thung Yai Naresuan (West and East) Wildlife Sanctuary
- Khao Sanampriang Wildlife Sanctuary
- Um Phang Wildlife Sanctuary
- Erawan National Park
- Chaloem Rattanakosin National Park
- Sai Yok National Park
- Si Nakharin National Park
- Khlong Lan National Park
- Mae Wong National Park
- Phu Toei National Park
- Khlong Wang Chao National Park
- Khao Laem National Park
- Thong Pha Phum National Park
- Lam Khlong Ngu National Park
- Mae Nam Phachi Wildlife Sanctuary
- Kaeng Krachan National Park

== Conservation efforts ==
=== Tigers ===
In January 2024, a female tiger with two cubs was recorded for the first time in over a decade in the Salak Phra Wildlife Sanctuary.
