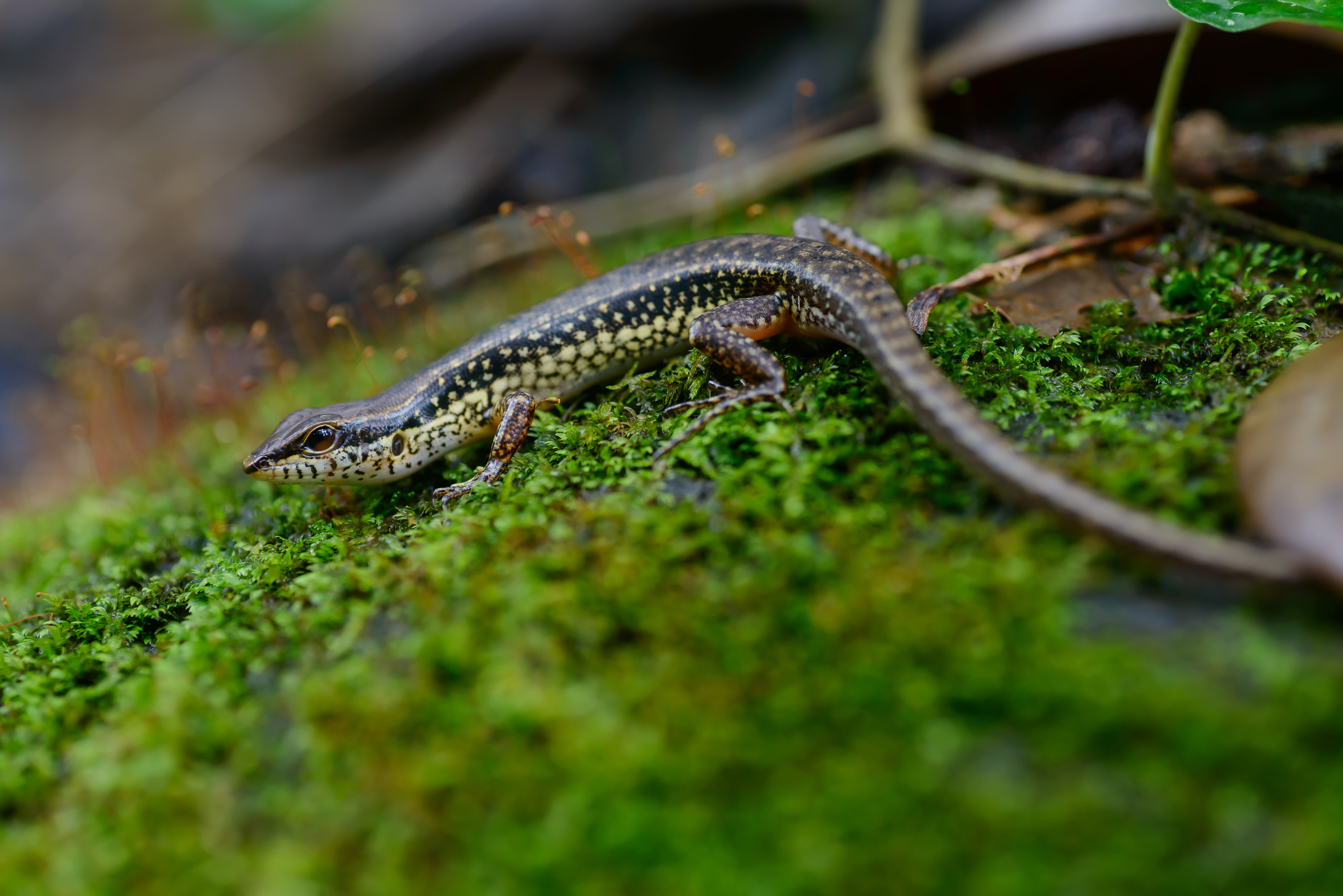

Conservation status
- Least Concern (IUCN 3.1)

Scientific classification
- Kingdom: Animalia
- Phylum: Chordata
- Class: Reptilia
- Order: Squamata
- Family: Scincidae
- Genus: Sphenomorphus
- Species: S. maculatus

Binomial name
- Sphenomorphus maculatus (Blyth, 1853)

Subspecies
- S. m. maculatus (Blyth, 1853); S. m. mitanensis (Annandale, 1905)

= Sphenomorphus maculatus =

Spotted forest skink

Species of lizard

Sphenomorphus maculatus, the spotted forest skink, maculated forest skink or stream-side skink is a species of skink found in China, South Asia and Southeast Asia.

== Description ==
Physical Structure: Head tapered and flat. Tail tapered and as long as two times of snout–vent length. Trunk and eyelid covered with scales. Scales on the back towards the tail larger. .

Color: Upper side of the head, body and tail is brown, with smooth scales, and faint darker markings. The throat and belly are pale and immaculate. On the flanks, beneath the dark stripe, a mottled zone comprising yellowish and brown spots.

Length: Maximum: 19 cm, Common: 17 cm(SVL. 6 cm)

It is non-venomous and harmless to humans.

== Distribution ==
Bangladesh, Bhutan, Cambodia, China (S Yunnan, SE Xizang = Tibet), India (Andaman and Nicobar Islands, Darjeeling), Malaysia, Myanmar, Nepal, Singapore, Sunda region (Brunei, Indonesia, Papua New Guinea, Timor-Leste), Thailand (Northern) and Vietnam.

== Habitat ==
Terrestrial; nocturnal; inhabits the vicinity of streams and small rivers in lowland and hilly areas. Found foraging among rocks and vegetation right at the waters edge.

== Diet ==
Feeds on small insects and invertebrates.

== Reproduction ==
Oviparous. Courtship and mating behavior is strictly ritualized and starts in April–June. Hatchlings emerge at the end of August–September .

== Note ==
Death-feigning behavior has been observed in this species: In captivity all of these, when handled, dropped on their back and remained immobile for around 35–45 seconds. During this period the animal becomes stiff, stretching out its fore and hind limbs. Just before the animal regained mobility, a rapid heartbeat was observed and then the animal was seen to roll over very quickly on its feet and attempt a quick escape.
