= Lam Khlong Ngu National Park =

National park in Thailand

Coordinates: 14.86°N 98.89°E

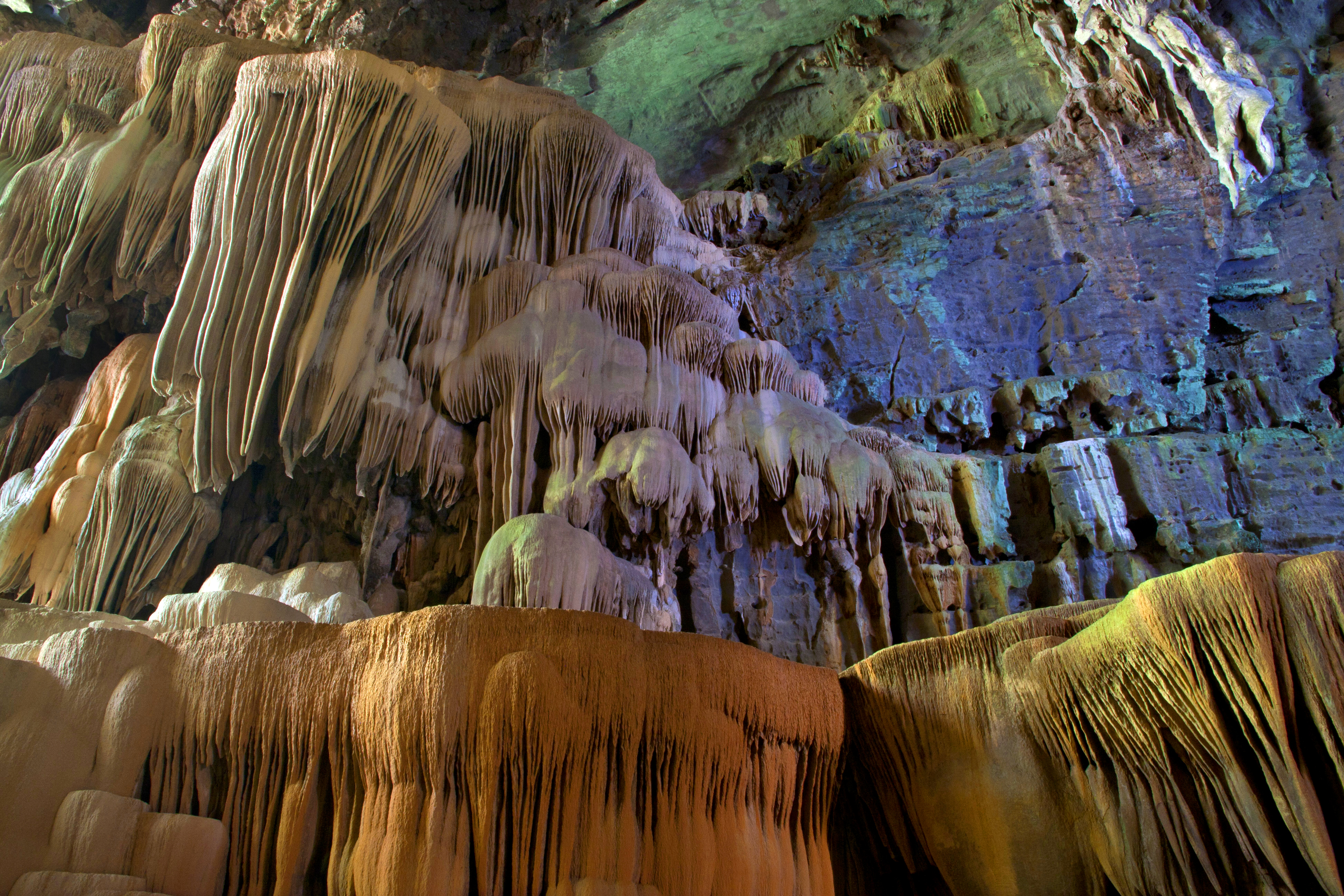
Lam Khlong Ngu National Park.

Lam Khlong Ngu National Park (Thai: อุทยานแห่งชาติลำคลองงู) is a national park in Chale, Thong Pha Phum District, Kanchanaburi Province, Thailand. It was established on 25 December 2009. The park, caves and waterfall are in the protected area of Department of National Parks, Wildlife and Plant Conservation.

== Geography ==
Lam Khlong Ngu occupies 420,374 rai ~ 673 square kilometres (260 sq mi) and is located on Tanaosri Mountains from north to south. Most of the area is covered with many valleys and hills. The height of middle sea level is about 100 – 1000 meters. The important hill is Bor Ngam hill.

== Climate ==
The climate is tropical monsoon. It is influenced by Southwest monsoon in summer and Northeast monsoon in winter. In summer, the weather is the hottest and in winter, the weather is the coolest. It has three seasons : Summer from March until May, Rainy from June until October and winter from November until February. From June to September there are many clouds while from November to April a few clouds are found.

== Attractions ==
=== Nang Kruan Waterfall ===
Nang Kruan waterfall is a big limestone waterfall in Lam Khlong Ngu. Water runs in the waterfall all the year-round. The headwater is from Thong Pha Phum creek and Chalae creek. There are 7 levels.

=== Kliti waterfall ===
Kliti waterfall is a limestone waterfall like Nang Kruan waterfall.

=== Monolithic cave ===
Waterway of Lam Khlong Ngu flows through the cave and inside monolithic cave has the monolithic is located by nature. The cave has the highest monolithic in the world. The height is 62.5 meters.

== Location ==
Lam Khlong Ngu National Park in overview PARO 3 (Ban Pong)

6) Lam Khlong Ngu National Park in overview PARO 3 (Ban Pong)

	National park
1	Thai Prachan
2	Chaloem Rattanakosin
3	Erawan
4	Khao Laem
5	Khuean Srinagarindra
6	Lam Khlong Ngu
7	Phu Toei
8	Sai Yok
9	Thong Pha Phum

	Wildlife sanctuary
10	Mae Nam Phachi
11	Salak Phra
12	Thung Yai Naresuan West
	Forest park
22	Phra Thaen Dong Rang
23	Phu Muang
24	Tham Khao Noi

	Non-hunting area
13	Bueng Kroengkawia– Nong Nam Sap
14	Bueng Chawak
15	Khao Pratap Chang
16	Phantai Norasing
17	Somdet Phra Srinagarindra
18	Tham Khang Khao– Khao Chong Phran
19	Tham Lawa– Tham Daowadueng
20	Wat Rat Sattha Kayaram
21	Wat Tham Rakhang– Khao Phra Non

== See also ==
- List of national parks of Thailand
- DNP - Lam Khlong Ngu National Park
- List of Protected Areas Regional Offices of Thailand
