= Vajiralongkorn Dam =

Dam in Thong Pha Phum, Kanchanaburi, Thailand

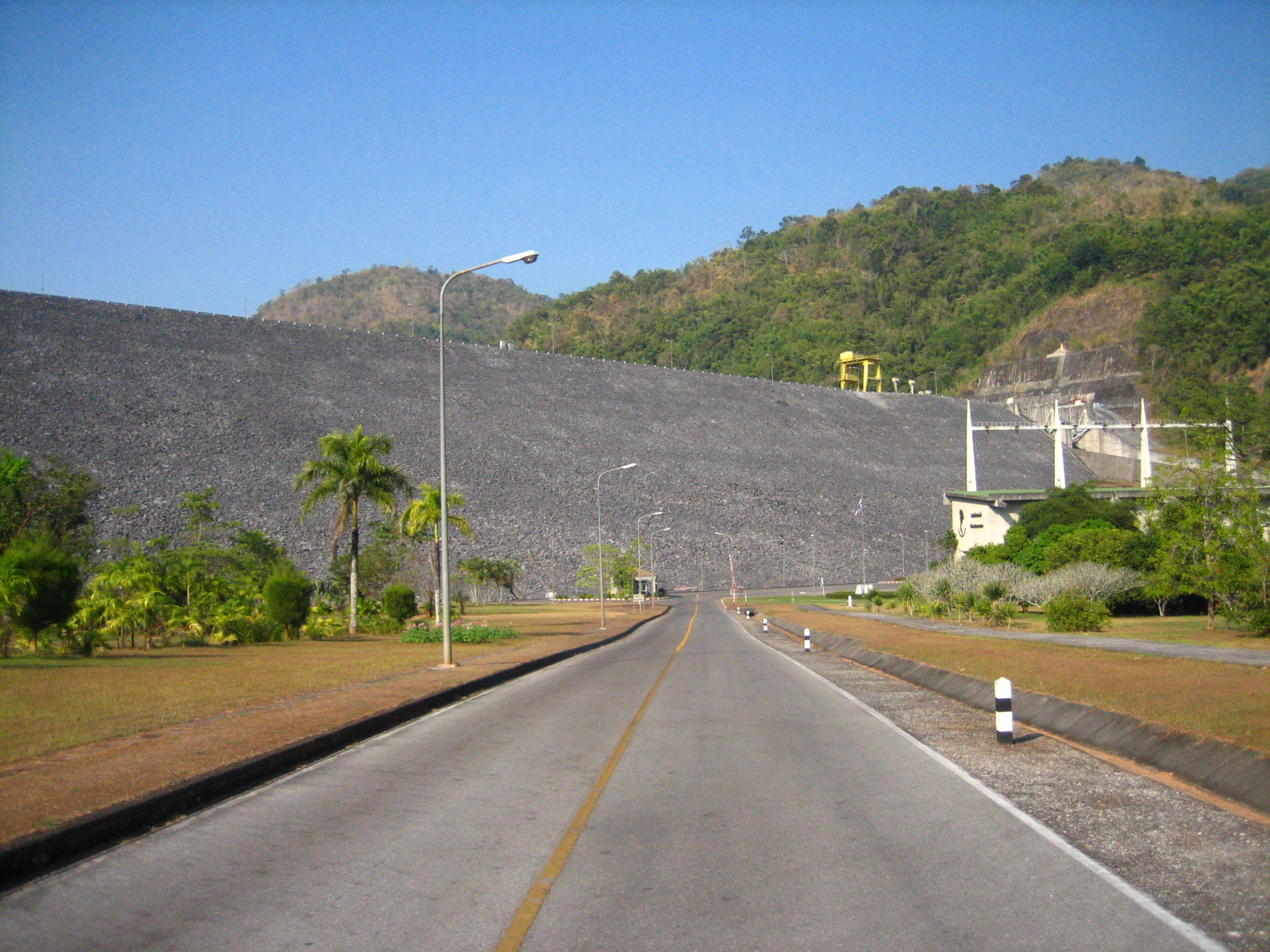
- The Vajiralongkorn Dam

- Location within Thailand
- Official name: Vajiralongkorn Dam
- Country: Thailand
- Location: Thong Pha Phum, Kanchanaburi
- Coordinates: 14°47′58″N 98°35′49″E
- Construction began: 1979
- Opening date: 1984
- Operator: Electricity Generating Authority of Thailand

Dam and spillways
- Type of dam: Embankment, concrete-face rock-fill
- Impounds: Khwae Noi River
- Height: 92 m (302 ft)
- Length: 1,019 m (3,343 ft)
- Width (base): 10 m (33 ft)
- Dam volume: 8,860 million m^{3}

Reservoir
- Surface area: 388 km^{2}

Power Station
- Turbines: 3 × 100 MW Francis-type
- Installed capacity: 300 MW
- Annual generation: 760 GWh

Vajiralongkorn Dam (Thai: เขื่อนวชิราลงกรณ; RTGS: Khuean Wachiralongkon), also called the Khao Laem Dam (เขื่อนเขาแหลม), is a concrete-faced rock-fill dam (CFRD) in Thong Pha Phum district, Kanchanaburi province, Thailand. The dam lies across the Khwae Noi River and was renamed Vajiralongkorn Dam after then-Crown Prince Vajiralongkorn on 13 July 2001 when he was crown prince. Vajiralongkorn Dam is Thailand's first CFRD and supplies a 300 MW hydroelectric power station with water. The dam was built and is managed by the Electricity Generating Authority of Thailand (EGAT).

== Construction ==
Dam construction began in 1979 and took five years to complete. Its reservoir started filling with water in June, 1984. Three 100MW hydropower generators came on line in October and December 1984 and February 1985 respectively. The reservoir created by the dam has a maximum storage capacity of 8,860 million m^{3} inundating 388 square km^{2}. Average runoff into the reservoir is approximately 5,500 million m^{3} per year.

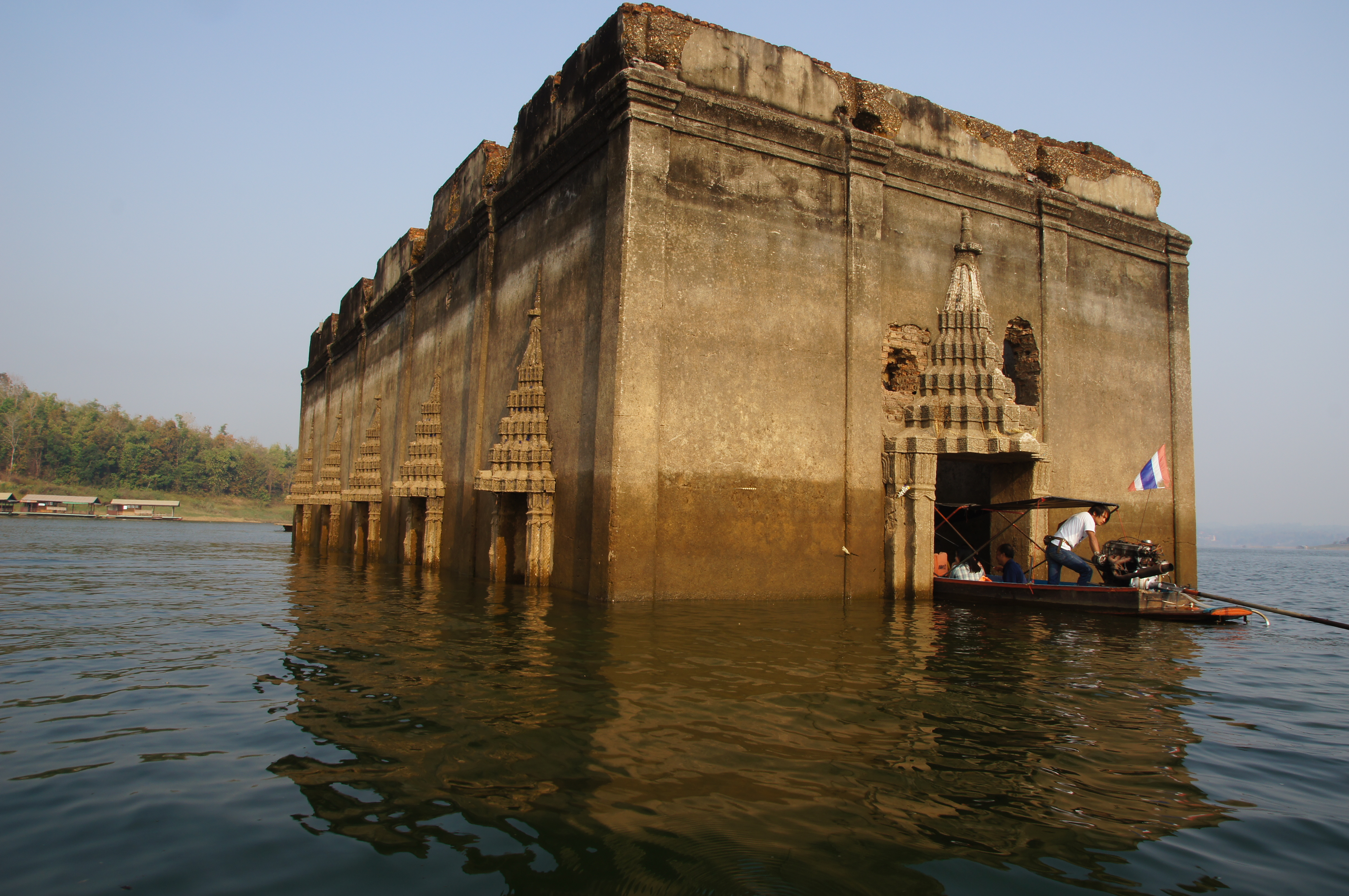
Inundated temple, Vajiralongkorn Reservoir

== See also ==
- List of power stations in Thailand
- Srinagarind Dam – downstream
