= 1966 Air New Zealand DC-8 crash =

1966 aviation accident in New Zealand

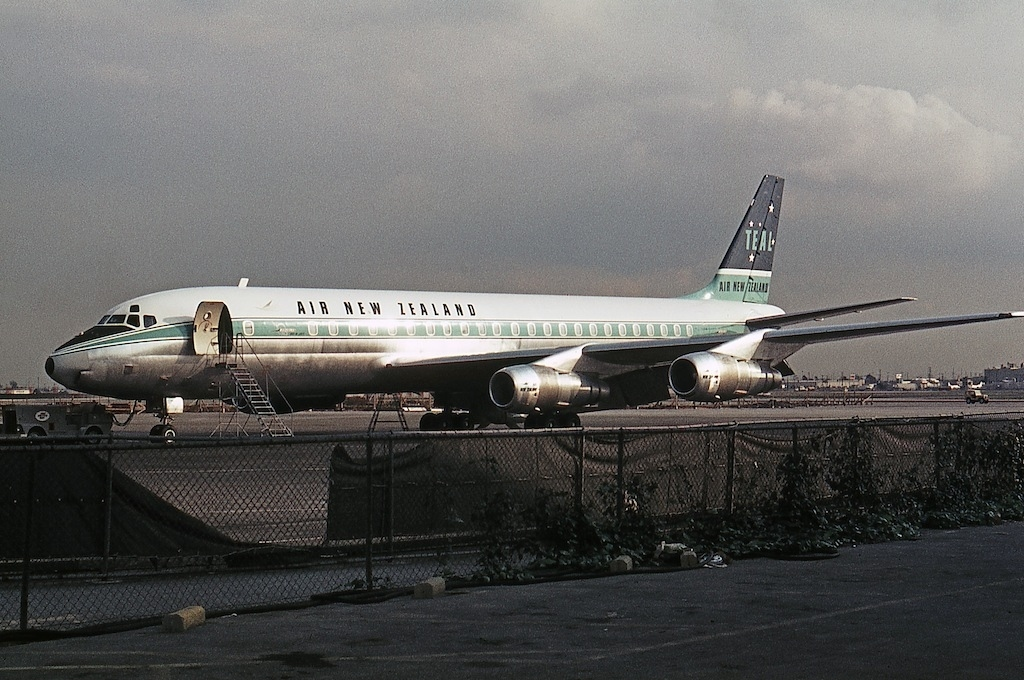
- The aircraft involved in the accident during its delivery flight in 1965

Accident
- Date: 4 July 1966
- Summary: Crashed on takeoff following reverse thrust deployment
- Site: Auckland International Airport, Auckland, New Zealand; 37°00′36″S 174°47′29″E

Aircraft
- Aircraft type: Douglas DC-8-52
- Operator: Air New Zealand
- Registration: ZK-NZB
- Flight origin: Auckland International Airport
- Destination: Auckland International Airport
- Occupants: 5
- Crew: 5
- Fatalities: 2
- Injuries: 3
- Survivors: 3

On 4 July 1966, an Air New Zealand Douglas DC-8-52 crashed on takeoff from Auckland International Airport on a training flight, killing 2 out of the 5 crew members on board. The crash was the first fatal accident in the history of Air New Zealand and the only accident to that date of a commercial airliner in New Zealand. The investigation concluded that during the captain's attempt to simulate an engine failure, the captain accidentally deployed the thrust reverser on the number four engine. This resulted in the aircraft's speed falling below the minimum control speed, which resulted in the aircraft becoming uncontrollable and the eventual crash.

== Aircraft ==
The aircraft involved in the accident was a one-year-old Douglas DC-8-52, with registration ZK-NZB and manufacturer's serial number 45751. The aircraft had four Pratt and Whitney JT3D-3B turbofan engines. The aircraft had a total of 2,275 airframe hours, with the last maintenance check occurring on 1 July 1966.

== Crew ==
There were five crew members on board the flight. In command of the flight was 46-year-old Captain Donal McLachlan, who had 17,966 flight hours, 497 of which in the DC-8. He was serving as an instructor for 29-year-old trainee First Officer Brian Ruffell. He had 4,200 hours of flying time, although only 21 of which were on the DC-8. The flight engineer of the flight was 33-year-old Gordon Tonkin, who had 4,250 flight hours. The other two crew members of the flight were Captain Bernard Wyatt and First Officer Kenneth Sawyer, who had no official flying duties. First Officer Ruffell was sitting in the left seat in the cockpit while Captain McLachlan was sitting in the right seat.

== Background ==
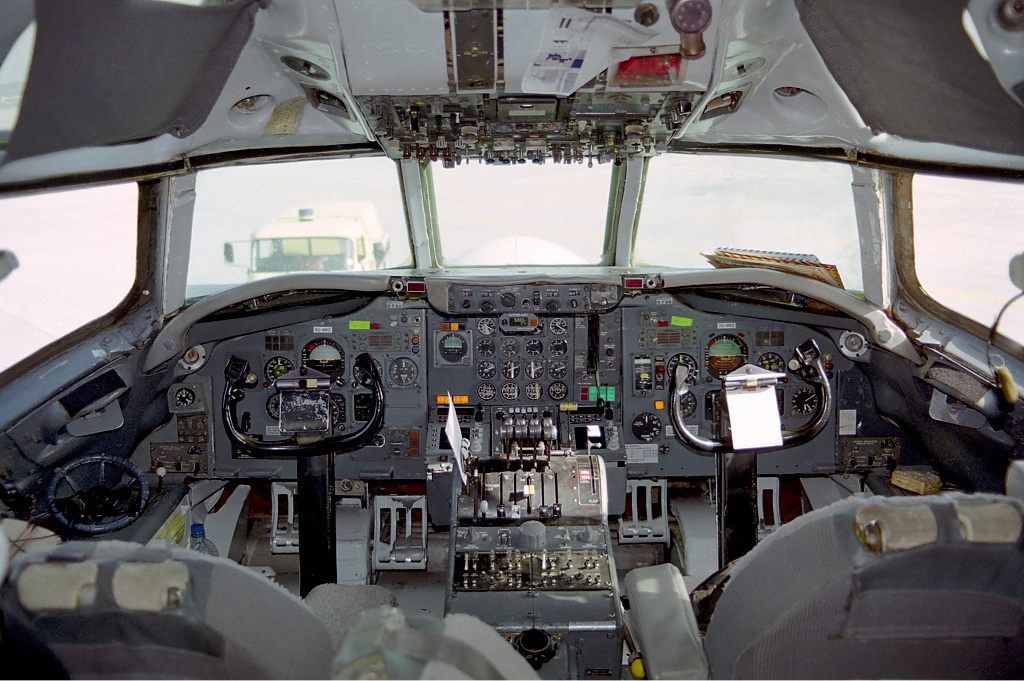
An overview of the thrust levers in the DC-8 cockpit, with the spoiler disarm extension rod on the side of the number four thrust lever

The aircraft was conducting a training flight, with Captain McLachlan serving as an instructor for First Officer Ruffell. The captain would be training the first officer on touch-and-go landings and simulated engine failures after V_{1} speed. V_{1} speed is the maximum airspeed where a flight crew can safely perform a rejected takeoff. On this flight, soon after reaching V_{1} speed, Captain McLachlan would pull back the power on an engine thrust lever, and First Officer Ruffel would have to identify the simulated failed engine, use the rudder to keep the aircraft flying straight, and keep the airspeed increasing.

Captain McLachlan had been involved in a previous flight training incident involving the accident aircraft on 2 April 1966. During that incident flight, he was training a trainee first officer on engine failures during touch-and-go landings. When the captain tried to pull back the thrust lever for the number four engine, instead of using his whole hand, he used only his thumb and index finger on the knob of the lever. He pulled back the thrust lever of the engine with such speed that the inertia caused the thrust brakes to enter the reverse detent. The aircraft rolled sharply to the right, and the first officer, who was the pilot flying, was unable to maintain directional control even when applying a full left rudder. Captain McLachlan managed to stow the reverser and conduct a three-engine climb.

The investigation believed that this switched McLachlan's method of simulating an engine failure on the number four engine. Instead of using the aforementioned technique to reduce power on the engine, he used the spoiler disarm extension, a rod attached to the number four thrust lever. The intended use of the rod is to retract the spoilers when the thrust levers were advanced to high power. It is not intended to be used as a handle.

== Accident ==
The flight crew started up the aircraft engines at 15:50 NZST and four minutes later, air traffic control cleared ZK-NZB to the holding position at the threshold of runway 23. At 15:59, the aircraft was cleared for takeoff from the runway. Fourteen seconds after the start of the takeoff roll, the aircraft reached V_{1} speed. At this moment, Captain McLachlan used the spoiler disarm extension to reduce power on the number four engine. However, this action caused the thrust reverser on the number four engine to activate. First Officer Ruffell was initially able to correct yaw that the asymmetrical thrust that the engine produced. Three seconds later, the DC-8 reached V_{R} speed, the speed where the aircraft under normal conditions can safely start rotation. The first officer pulled back on the control column, but the aircraft rotated much steeper than usual, and he felt a significant drag on the right side of the aircraft. He attempted to counteract it with a full left rudder, but this did not stop the yawing motion.

The airspeed peaked at 124.5 kn (230.6 km/h; 143.3 mph) 20 seconds after the beginning of the takeoff roll. The aircraft started to roll to the right while just 100 ft (30 m) above the ground. Three and a half seconds later, the right wingtip impacted the ground near the edge of the runway while the aircraft was rolled nearly 50° to the right. The rest of the DC-8 soon impacted the ground, causing the number one, three, and four engines to be torn off of the wings. The nose section of the aircraft separated from the rest of the fuselage and became inverted. Leaking fuel tanks set both parts of the aircraft on fire. Inside the cockpit, all crew members survived the impact but were seriously injured. By the time rescue services reached them, Captain McLachlan and Flight Engineer Tonkin were dead. First Officer Ruffell, Captain Wyatt, and First Officer Sawyer were all brought to a hospital.

Many people inside the airport terminal witnessed the accident, without realizing that it was a training flight. Confusion arose as another Air New Zealand Douglas DC-8 had taken off for a passenger flight to Brisbane 10 minutes before the crash. Relatives of those on the flight believed that it was that flight that crashed after returning to Auckland. Firefighters also believed that it was a passenger flight that crashed until they found no passengers in the cabin of the aircraft.

== Investigation ==
The accident was to be investigated by the Accidents Investigation Branch, part of the New Zealand Department of Civil Aviation.

=== Witness accounts ===
First Officer Ruffell and Captain Wyatt were able to be interviewed in the aftermath of the crash. Ruffell said that the takeoff roll before V_{R} was normal. After V_{R}, he described that the drag on the right side of the aircraft was so severe that he thought that Captain McLachlan simulated the failure on engine number three and four. He said that even after applying a full left rudder, he could not keep the aircraft flying straight. He also believed that the captain was moving the thrust levers after V_{1}. Captain Wyatt reported that when the aircraft reached V_{1}, Captain McLachlan used the spoiler disarm extension to reduce power on the number four engine. Before he took cover behind the front left seat, he reported that there were no warnings or warning lights active inside the cockpit.

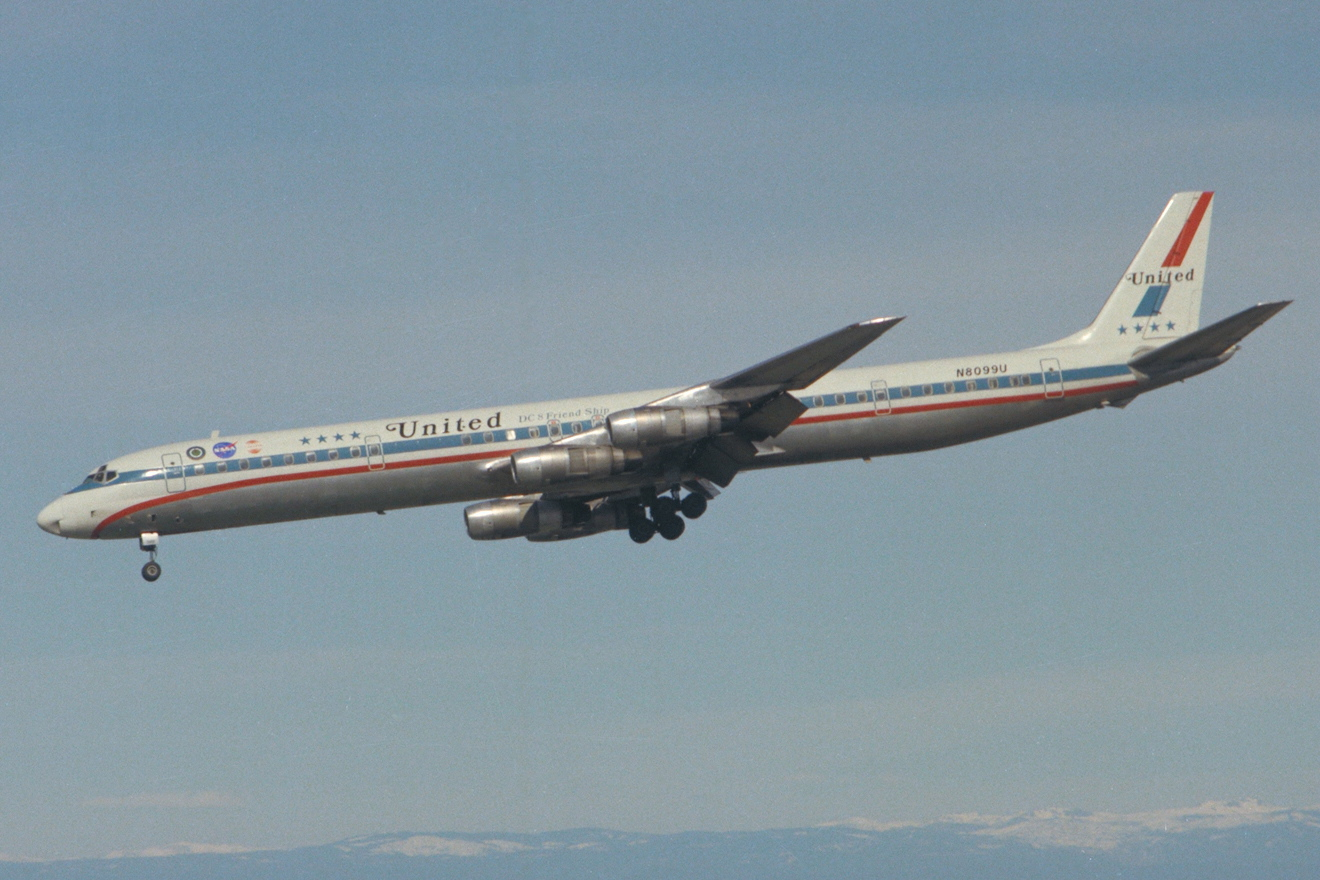
A Douglas DC-8 with its cascade doors open on the number two (left inboard) engine

The investigation board interviewed twelve witnesses to the crash, eleven employees of Air New Zealand and one executive officer of a different airline. All witnesses had observed many times and were accustomed to aircraft taking off at the airport. Most witnesses reported that the takeoff appeared normal, the rotation being steeper than usual, the right wing moving downward, and the aircraft never reaching more than 100 ft (30 m). Four witnesses reported a sound usual with a simulated engine failure during takeoff, two witnesses reported the aircraft's rudder deflected fully left, and only one witness reported the use of the ailerons. While none of the witnesses saw the aircraft begin its takeoff roll, seven of them saw the aircraft at some point on the runway. Four of those seven witnesses reported seeing the fan cascade doors, a crucial part of the reverse thrust system on the Pratt and Whitney JT3D engines, open on the number four engine. This was indicative of a reverse thrust deployment.

=== Evidence in wreckage and later tests ===
ZK-NZB was only equipped with a flight data recorder (FDR) and it did not have a cockpit voice recorder. The FDR only recorded four values: heading, airspeed, altitude, and vertical acceleration. Thus, whether the thrust reverser was deployed could not be verified from the FDR. When the wreckage of the number four engine was examined, it was determined that the reverser was stowed at the time of impact. To determine if the reverser on the number four engine was indeed deployed in flight, the investigation conducted several tests.

The first test was to determine whether the witnesses could have actually seen the fan cascade doors in an open position. To do this, the investigation used an Air New Zealand DC-8 aircraft that would replicate the path of the test flight, activating the reverse thrust when and where the witnesses said it was on ZK-NZB. This proved that the fan cascade doors were easily visible from the locations where the witnesses were.

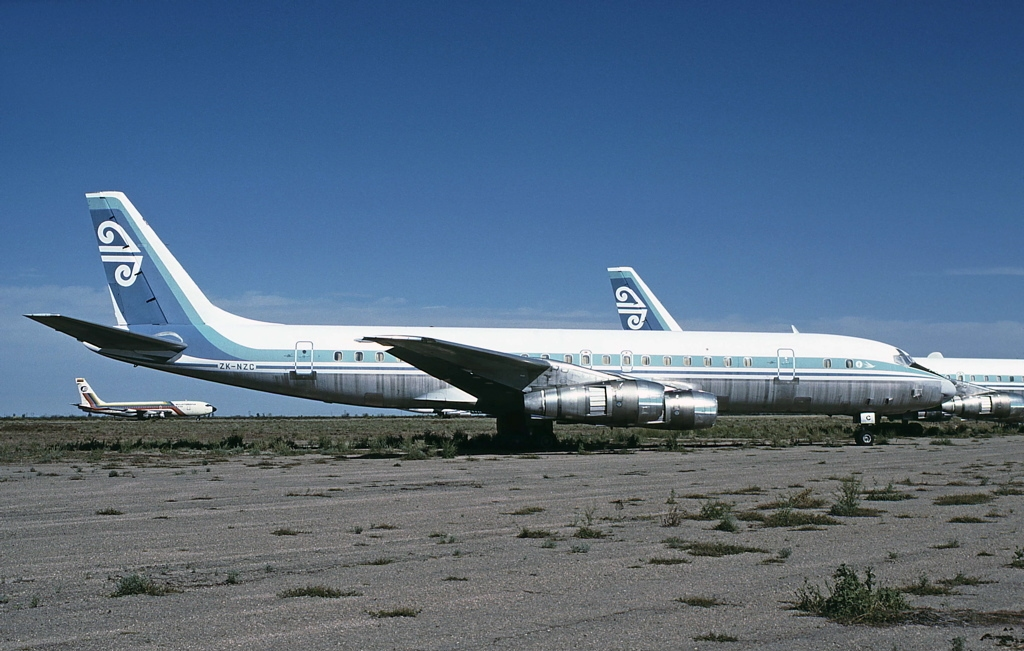
ZK-NZC, one of the DC-8s involved in the tests

A second test was conducted to see if what Captain Wyatt described on the accident flight, Captain McLachlan using the spoiler disarm extension to reduce power on the number four engine, could have caused a reverse thrust deployment. Using a parked DC-8, investigators replicated Captain McLachlan's technique and found that at sufficient speeds, the inertia force created by the movement could cause the thrust brake lever to enter the reverse detent. The number four engine reverser lights had activated, and a physical inspection confirmed the deployment of the number four engine. The same sequence of events was observed when using the captain's technique that he used on the 2 April flight. Based on the evidence, the investigation determined that the captain inadvertently activated the reverse thrust on the number four engine, noticed the problem, but deactivated it too late to recover the aircraft.

The investigation also had to determine why the aircraft became uncontrollable after the thrust reverser had deployed. On any aircraft, V_{mca} is the minimum controllable speed with an engine inoperative. It is never designed to be above V_{R}. On the accident flight, V_{mca} was 113 kn (209 km/h; 130 mph) and V_{R} was 118 kn (219 km/h; 136 mph). However, with an activated thrust reverser on the number four engine, V_{mca} was 141 kn (261 km/h; 162 mph), which only increased with reduced controls.

=== Final report ===
In their final report, the Accidents Investigation Branch determined that the primary cause of the accident was:

The primary cause of this accident was the incurrence of reverse thrust during simulated failure of the no. 4 engine on takeoff. That condition arose when very rapid rearward movement of the power level generated an inertia force which caused the associated thrust brake lever to rise and enter the reverse idle detent. After lift-off, the minimum control speed essentially required to overcome the prevailing state of thrust imbalance was never attained and an uncontrollable roll, accompanied by some degree of yaw and sideslip in the same direction, ensued. When the condition of reverse thrust was recognised and eliminated, insufficient time and height were available to allow the aircraft to recover from its precarious attitude before it struck the ground.

In the investigation's comments section, they determined that Captain McLachlan likely developed his habit of quickly reducing power on the engine because the aircraft accelerated from V_{1} to V_{R} in a matter of seconds, and he felt pressured to simulate engine failures in that timeframe. The report summarized the problem that resulted in the crash by saying:

For it is a well-recognised fact that if a particular thing can be done, albeit quite unintentionally, then sooner or later some person will do it.

== Aftermath ==
Within three hours after it was discovered that a fast movement to idle power could cause a reverse thrust deployment, the AIB notified the Douglas Aircraft Company of the flaw, who later sent out notices to all DC-8 operators and pilots of the risk. In the final report, the AIB called for a mechanical intervention to stop the deployment of reverse thrust in the circumstances that led to the accident, although it makes no mention as to whether this was followed through.

Despite having the authority to prosecute any persons or organizations for the accident, the AIB found no basis for prosecution.

== See also ==
- Pacific Western Airlines Flight 314
- Lauda Air Flight 004
- TAM Transportes Aéreos Regionais Flight 402
