= Wahrmund =

Wahrmund (German pronunciation: [ˈvaːɐ̯mʊnt]) is a surname. Notable people with the surname include:

- Adolf Wahrmund (1827–1913), Austrian-German orientalist
- Ludwig Wahrmund (1860–1932), Austrian professor
- Jackie Wahrmund (1860–1932), Lecturer at University of Kentucky
- Gary Wahrmund (1964-), National Championship Athlete at Southwest Texas State University
- Madi Wahrmund (2000-), Athlete at Lafayette College and University of Iowa
