= Pairat Decharin =

Governor of Thai provinces Chai Nat and Chiang Mai

36th Governor of Chai Nat
- In office 1984–1987
- Preceded by: Kusol Santitham
- Succeeded by: Saisit Pornkaew

22nd Governor of Chiang Mai
- In office 1 October 1987 – 26 May 1991
- Preceded by: Chaiya Poonsiriwong
- Succeeded by: Chanasak Yuvaboon

Personal details
- Born: February 6, 1937 Singapore
- Died: May 26, 1991 (aged 54) Phu Toei National Park, Suphan Buri, Thailand
- Cause of death: Airplane crash
- Spouse: Suparp Decharin
- Children: Pasu Decharin

Dr. Pairat Decharin (Thai: ไพรัตน์ เดชะรินทร์; RTGS: Phairat Decharin, 6 February 1937 – 26 May 1991) was a Thai politician. He served as governor of Chiang Mai province between 1987 and 1991, having held the same position in Chai Nat province from 1984 to 1987.

Pairat and his family were among 223 people killed aboard Lauda Air Flight 004, which crashed into the Phu Toei National Park in Suphan Buri province. Charles S. Ahlgren, the former U.S. consul general to Chiang Mai, said "That accident not only took their lives and that of many of Chiang Mai's leaders, but dealt a blow to many development and planning activities in the town."
