= Guggenberger =

Guggenberger is a German surname. Notable people with the surname include:

- Anthony Guggenberger, Jesuit priest and historian
- Friedrich Guggenberger (1915–1988), German admiral and U-boat commander
- Ilse Guggenberger (born 1942), Colombian chess player
- Mark Guggenberger (born 1989), American ice hockey player
- Matthias Guggenberger (born 1984), Austrian skeleton racer
- Vinzenz Guggenberger (1929–2012), German Roman Catholic bishop
- Walter Guggenberger (born 1947), Austrian civil servant and politician
