= Clemens August Andreae =

Austrian economist

Clemens August Andreae (5 March 1929 – 26 May 1991) was an Austrian economist who served as a professor of political economics and the dean of law and political sciences for the University of Innsbruck. He wrote a book called Der größere Markt – Wirtschaftsintegration vom Atlantik bis zum Ural ("The Larger Market – Economic Integration from the Atlantic to the Urals"). Andreae was scheduled to give the opening speech for the 1986 Salzburg Festival; the opening speech is typically given by a prominent scientist or artist. Andreae replaced Ralf Dahrendorf, a West German sociologist and professor, who withdrew the pledge because he did not want to speak to an audience that included Kurt Waldheim, the president of Austria.

== Death ==
On 26 May 1991, Andreae was among 223 people Lauda Air Flight 004 aboard killed in a crash in Phu Toei National Park, Thailand caused by in-flight breakup. He was leading a group of students from the University of Innsbruck in a tour of the Far East. The passengers on the aircraft included 21 members of the University of Innsbruck, including Andreae, another professor, six assistants, and 13 students. Andreae had often led field visits to Hong Kong.

== Works ==
- Andreae, Clemens August and Dieter Schoen. Der größere Markt: Wirtschaftsintegration vom Atlantik bis zum Ural. Seewald Verlag, 1966.
- Andreae, Clemens August and Volkmar Muthesius. Unser kompliziertes Steurersystem. Beiträge von Clemens A[ugust] Andreae [u. a.] Volkmar Muthesius z. 70. Geburtstag am 19. März 1970. F. Knapp, 1970.
- Andreae, Clemens August and Reinhard Berthold Koester. Taxation: An International Disequilibrium, Issue 16. Akademie der Wissenschaften und der Literatur, 1987. ISBN 3515051252, 9783515051255.
- Andreae, Clemens August (editor: Franz Aubele) Wirtschaft und Gesellschaft: Ausgewählte Schriften in memoriam. Duncker & Humblot GmbH, 1994. ISBN 3428079604, 9783428079605.
