= University of Innsbruck =

Public university in Austria

- Leopold-Franzens-Universität Innsbruck
- Latin: Universitas Leopoldino Franciscea, Alma Mater Oenipontana
- Type: Public
- Established: October 15, 1669; 357 years ago (as a university)
- Rector: Veronika Sexl (2023-)
- Faculty: 3,966 (300 professors)
- Administrative staff: 1,607
- Students: 28,106(May 2022)
- Location: Innsbruck, Austria; 47°15′46″N 11°23′4″E
- Campus: Urban
- Website: www.uibk.ac.at

The University of Innsbruck (German: Leopold-Franzens-Universität Innsbruck; Latin: Universitas Leopoldino Franciscea) is a public research university in Innsbruck, the capital of the Austrian federal state of Tyrol, founded on October 15, 1669.

It is the largest educational facility in the Austrian Bundesland of Tirol, and the third largest in Austria behind the University of Vienna and the University of Graz. Significant contributions have been made in many branches, most of all in the physics department.

== History ==
In 1562, a Jesuit grammar school was established in Innsbruck by Peter Canisius, today called "Akademisches Gymnasium Innsbruck". It was financed by the salt mines in Hall in Tirol, and was re-chartered as a university on October 15, 1669, by Leopold I with four faculties. In 1782 this was reduced to a mere lyceum (as were all other universities in the Austrian Empire, apart from Prague, Vienna and Lviv), but it was reestablished as the University of Innsbruck in 1826 by Emperor Franz I. The university is therefore named after both of its founding fathers with the official title "Leopold-Franzens-Universität Innsbruck" (Universitas Leopoldino-Franciscea).

During the National Socialist era, the university was renamed the "Deutsche Alpenuniversität" in March 1941 at the suggestion of the then Rector Raimund von Klebelsberg. As at all universities, Säuberungsaktionen took place: opponents of the National Socialists were deprived of their powers and excluded from academic life. In 1945, after the end of World War II, it was reopened under the name "University of Innsbruck".

The second half of the 20th century brought further expansion of the university: in 1969 the Faculty of Civil Engineering and Architecture and in 1976 the Faculty of Humanities and the Faculty of Social and Economic Sciences, which emerged from the Faculty of Law and Political Sciences. In 2004, the Faculty of Medicine was spun off, and in 2012 the School of Education was established, which was later renamed the Faculty of Teacher Education.

In 1991, Lauda Air Flight 004 crashed in Thailand, killing all aboard, including 21 members of the University of Innsbruck. The passengers included professor and economist Clemens August Andreae, another professor, six assistants, and 13 students. Andreae had often led field visits to Hong Kong.

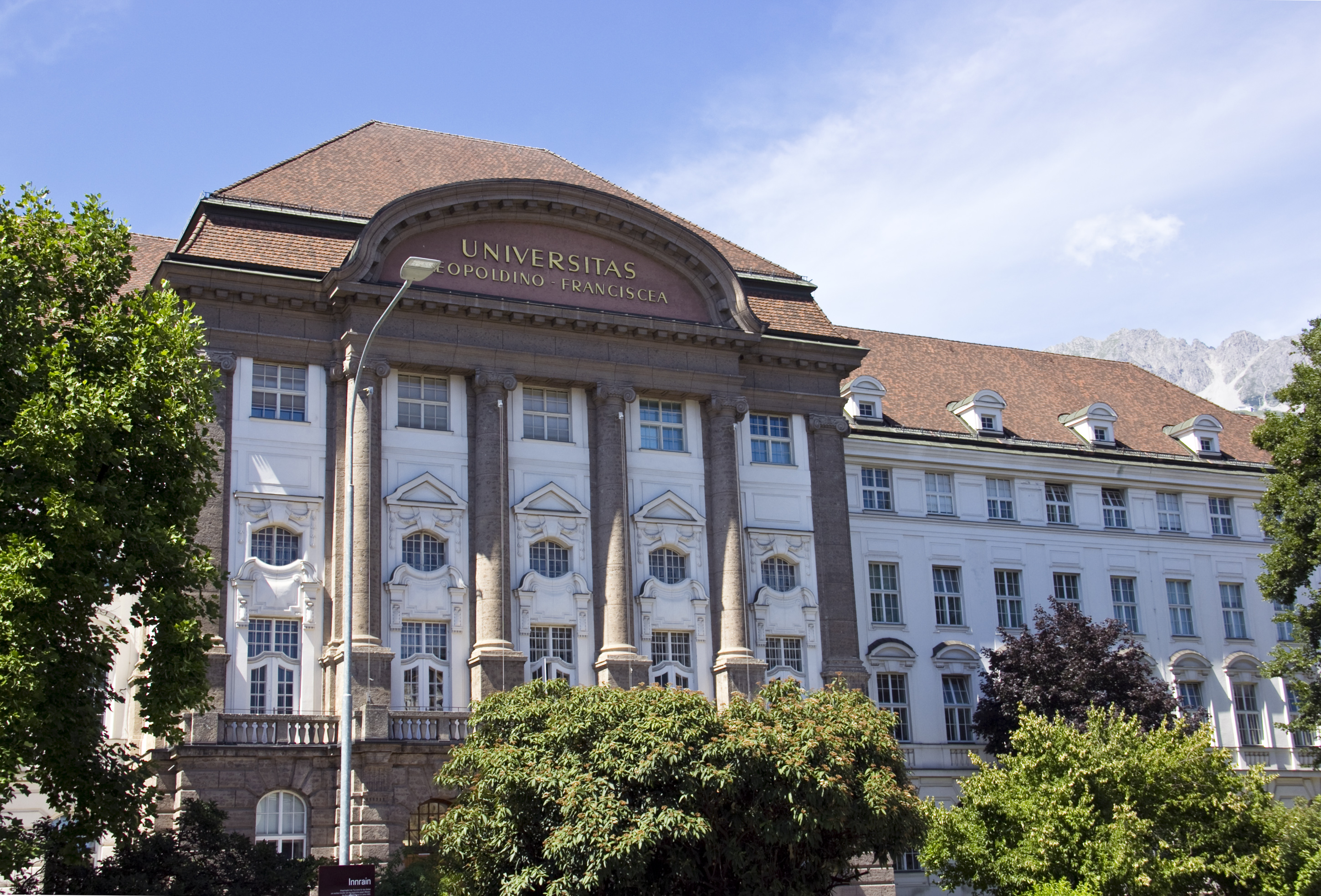
Main building of the University of Innsbruck

In 2005, copies of letters written by the emperors Frederick II and Conrad IV were found in the university's library. They arrived in Innsbruck in the 18th century, having left the charterhouse Allerengelberg in Schnals due to its abolition.

=== Ceremonial equipment ===
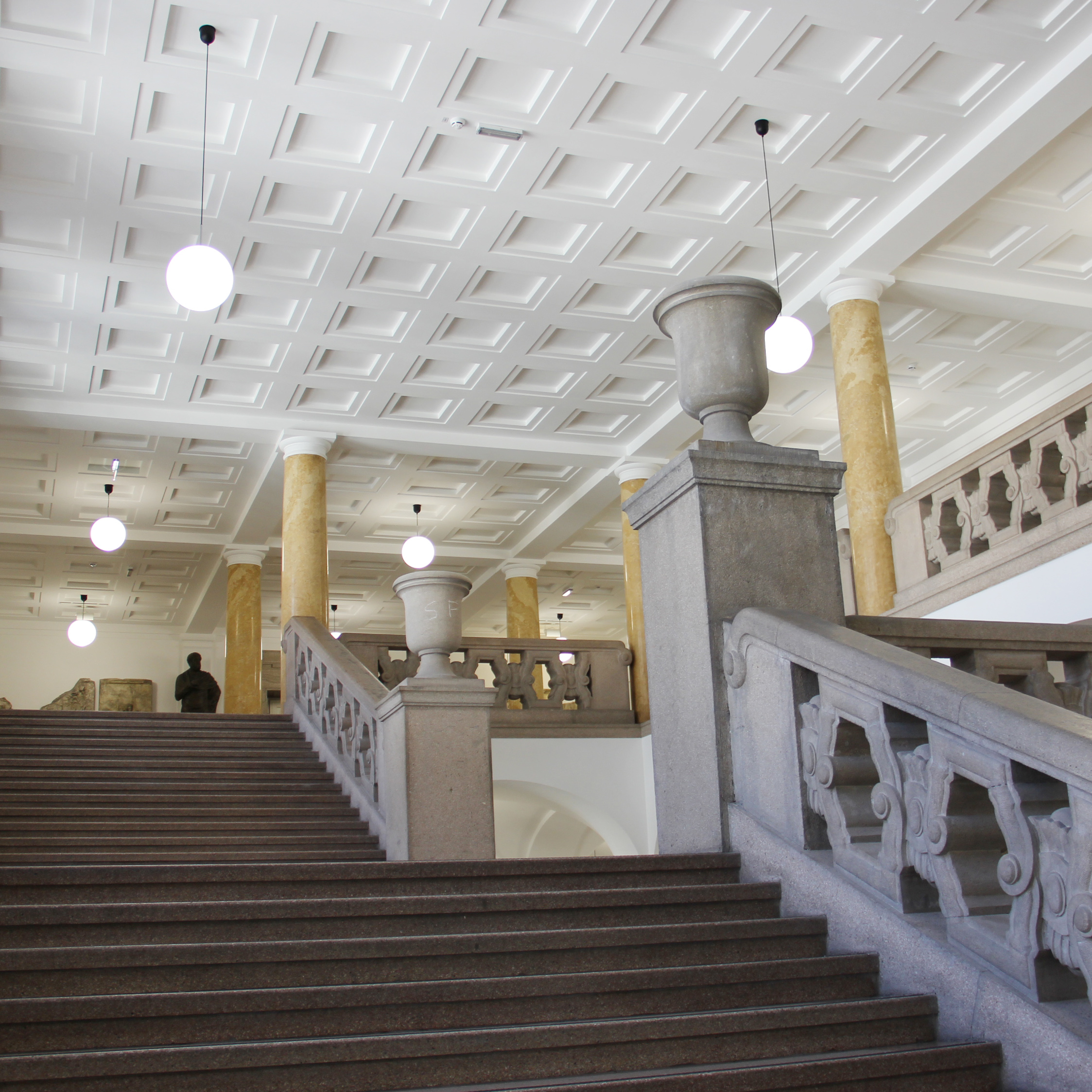
In the main building of the University of Innsbruck

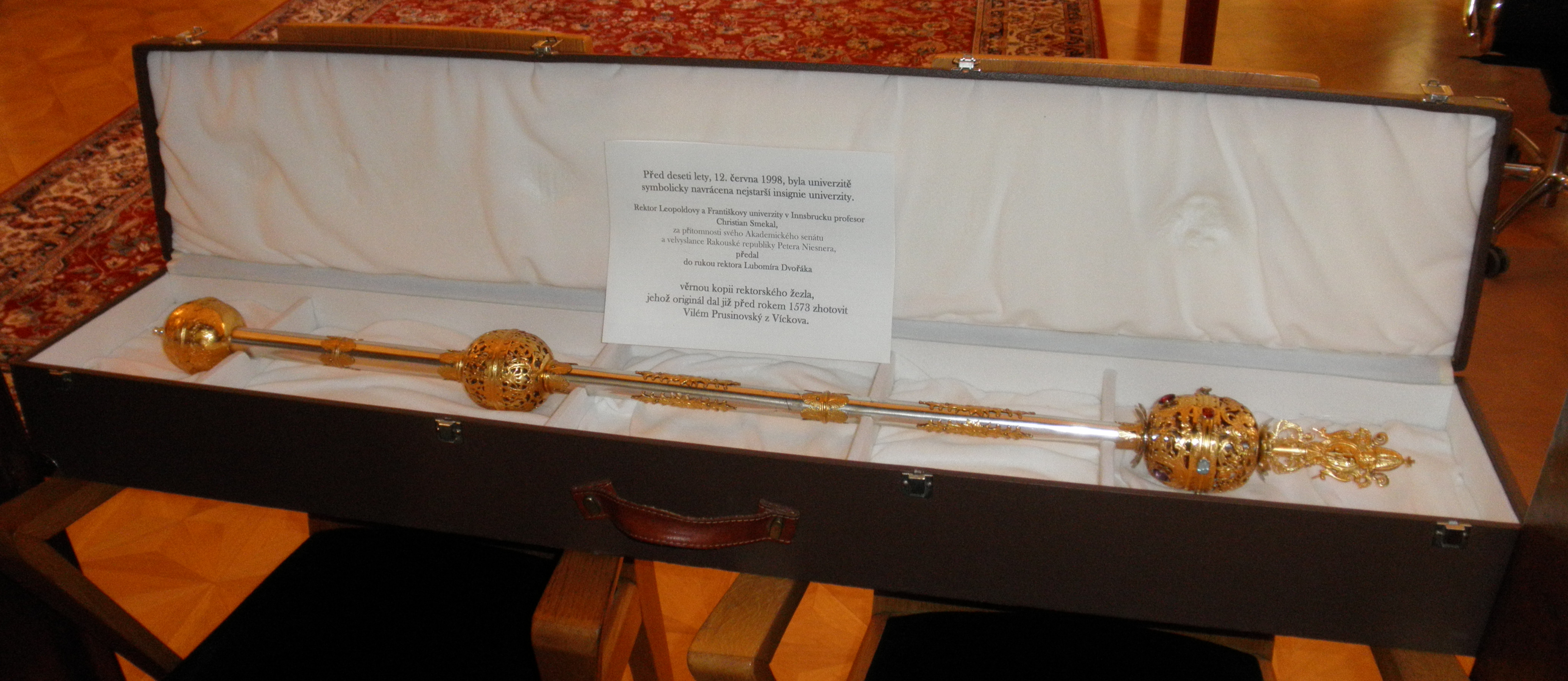
1998 copy of Olomouc University Rector's Mace - the original from ca. 1572 is as of 2015 still held by Innsbruck University

In the 1850s, the Habsburgs gradually closed the University of Olomouc as a consequence of the Olomouc students' and professors' participation in the 1848 revolutions and the Czech National Revival. The ceremonial equipment of the University of Olomouc was then transferred to the University of Innsbruck. The original Olomouc ceremonial maces from the 1580s are now used as the maces of Innsbruck University and Innsbruck Medical University. Olomouc University Rector's mace from ca. 1572 is nowadays used as the mace of the Innsbruck Faculty of Theology and Olomouc Faculty of Law Dean's Mace from 1833 is nowadays used as Innsbruck's Faculty of Law Mace.

Since the establishment of Czechoslovakia in 1918, the Czechs have been unsuccessfully requesting the return of the University of Olomouc's original ceremonial equipment. Many years later, in 1998, Innsbruck donated an exact copy of the rector's mace to Palacký University, but it is still, in 2015, using the Olomouc University original maces and other regalia as its own ceremonial equipment.

== Academics ==
University rankings

Global – Overall
- ARWU World: 201–300 (2024)
- QS World: =350 (2026)
- THE World: 301–350 (2025)
- USNWR Global: =466 (2024)

The quantum optical ground station ‘Marietta Blau’ is situated at an altitude of 2,280 metres above the city of Innsbruck. The telescope forms part of the University of Innsbruck’s research infrastructure.

Around 28,000 people study at the University of Innsbruck, making it one of the largest universities in Austria alongside the University of Vienna and the University of Graz. Every year, more than 4,000 students start a new degree program. Approximately the same number complete their studies at the university each year. Around 4000 courses are offered in the various subjects each academic year.

=== Programs ===
The university sees itself as a comprehensive university and covers a wide range of subjects with about 150 programs in 16 faculties: from architecture to zoology.

The university offers 41 bachelor's degree programs including teacher training programs, 60 master's degree programs, 4 diploma programs and 26 PhD/doctoral degree programs (as of the academic year 2022/23) in the fields of architecture, humanities, natural sciences, law, social sciences and economics, as well as theology and technical sciences.

For the bachelor's degree programs in architecture, biology, computer science, pharmacy, psychology, economics, the teacher training programs, the diploma program in international economics, and the master's degree programs in psychology, pharmaceutical sciences, and peace and conflict studies, special admission regulations apply prior to general admission. However, admission procedures are currently suspended for a majority of these studies.

Many studies can be supplemented with freely selectable packages on a wide variety of specializations such as digitalization, sustainability, media or corporate communications. A two-semester extension study program can be used to expand subject-specific competencies thematically. Currently, the university offers extension studies in entrepreneurship, computer science and scientific computing.

The Digital Science Center (DiSC), founded in 2019, teaches students digital skills. These range from programming languages to skills in data management and analysis to non-technical aspects of digitization.

After the separation of the Faculty of Medicine in 2004, medical studies are offered at the Medical University of Innsbruck.

In October 2021, a controversy arose about a Peace Studies course. As a result, the university management declared that, despite the name Master's program, it was not a regular master program, but an extraordinary course on peace, development, security and international conflict transformation.

Since 2022, a regular master's program in Peace and Conflict studies is taught at the university. In 2023, Rina Alluri was inaugurated as the new UNESCO Chair of Peace Studies.

=== Student representation ===
The Austrian Students' Association (ÖH) is the legal representation of all students in Austria. All students are automatically members of the ÖH and pay a fee of €26.20 per semester (academic year 2026/27), which is collected together with the tuition fee by the study department of the university.

=== Tuition fee ===
Regular students with EU/EEA/CH citizenship and students of equal status who are admitted to a bachelor's, diploma, master's or doctoral program pay only the ÖH fee at the beginning of their new studies. After exceeding the non-contributory period of study, a tuition fee of 363.36 euros (A, EU/EEA, CH) or for third-country nationals 726.72 euros per semester is charged.

== The faculties ==
The new plan of organisation (having become effective on October 1, 2004) installed the following 16 faculties to replace the previously existing six faculties:

- Faculty of Architecture,
- Faculty of Biology,
- Faculty of Catholic Theology,
- Faculty of Chemistry and Pharmacy,
- Faculty of Economics and Statistics,
- Faculty of Education,
- Faculty of Technical Sciences (formerly Faculty of Engineering Science and before that Faculty of Civil Engineering),
- Faculty of Geography and Atmospheric Sciences,
- Faculty of Humanities 1 (Philosophy and History),
- Faculty of Humanities 2 (Language and Literature),
- Faculty of Law,
- Faculty of Mathematics, Computer Science and Physics,
- Faculty of Psychology and Sports science,
- School of Political Sciences and Sociology,
- School of Management,
- School of Education (teacher training).

As of 1 January 2004, the Faculty of Medicine was sectioned off from the main university to become a university in its own right. This is now called the Innsbruck Medical University (Medizinische Universität Innsbruck).

The inter-disciplinary unit called the Digital Science Center (DiSC) was founded in 2019 to integrate and promote digitalisation of scientific research as well as to support high-quality science.

== Buildings ==
The university buildings are spread across the city and there is no university campus as such. The most important locations are:

- Theology faculty was opened 1562 as a Jesuit School in 1766 and the university used buildings from the Jesuit church in the Leopoldsaal (the original university).
- In 1924, main building and the university library opened.
- 1969 the scientific faculty and the construction faculty in Hotting west was opened.
- 1976 construction began on "Geiwi tower" for the former Philosophy faculty, an addition to the main building.
- 1997 The Social Science faculty (built in the former Fenner barracks) was opened.
- 2012 Center of Chemistry and Biomedicine was opened.
- 2023 Ágnes-Heller-House was opened.
- Several university clinics of the medical university in the area became Tyrolian national hospitals.
Fotogalerie: Universität Innsbruck

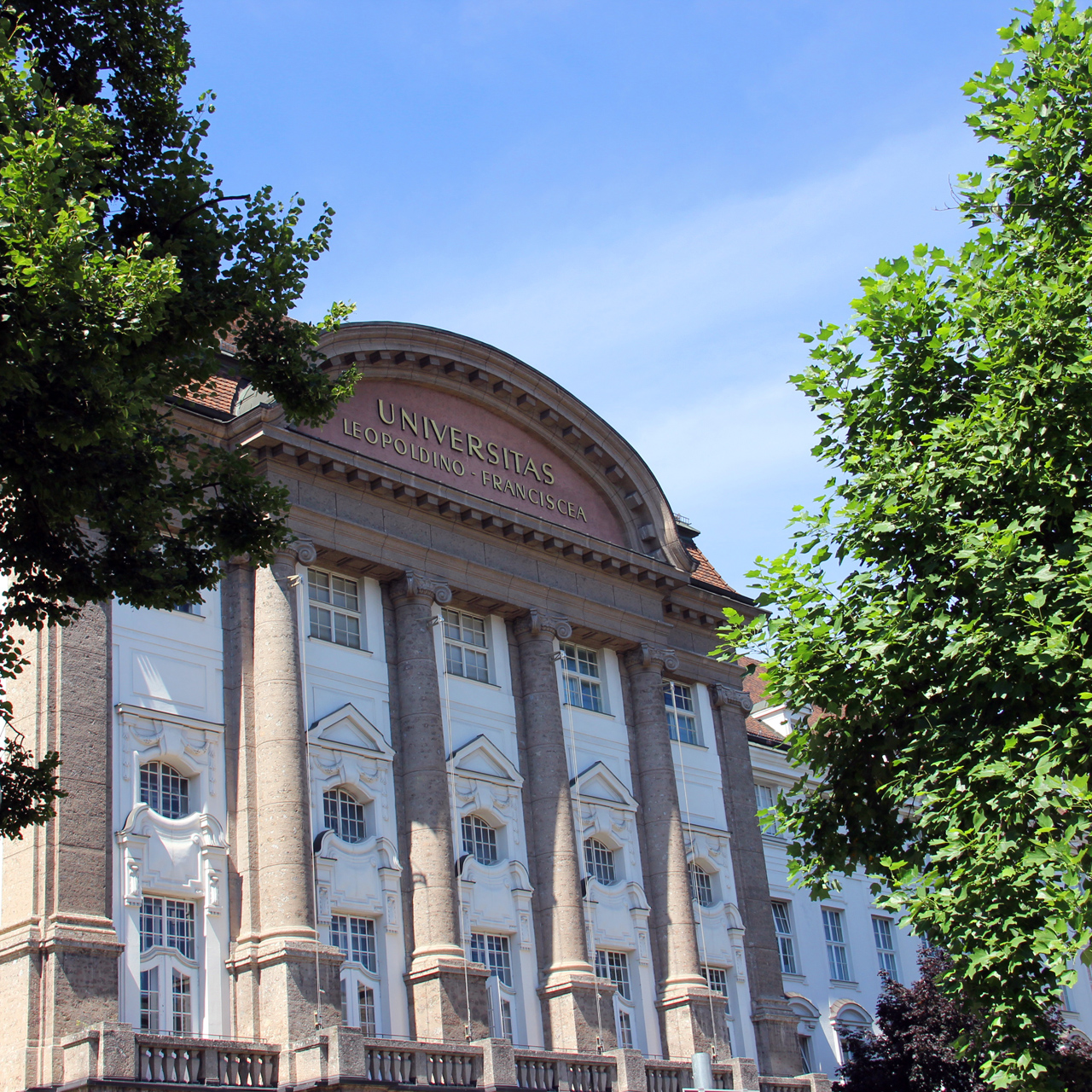
Hauptgebäude

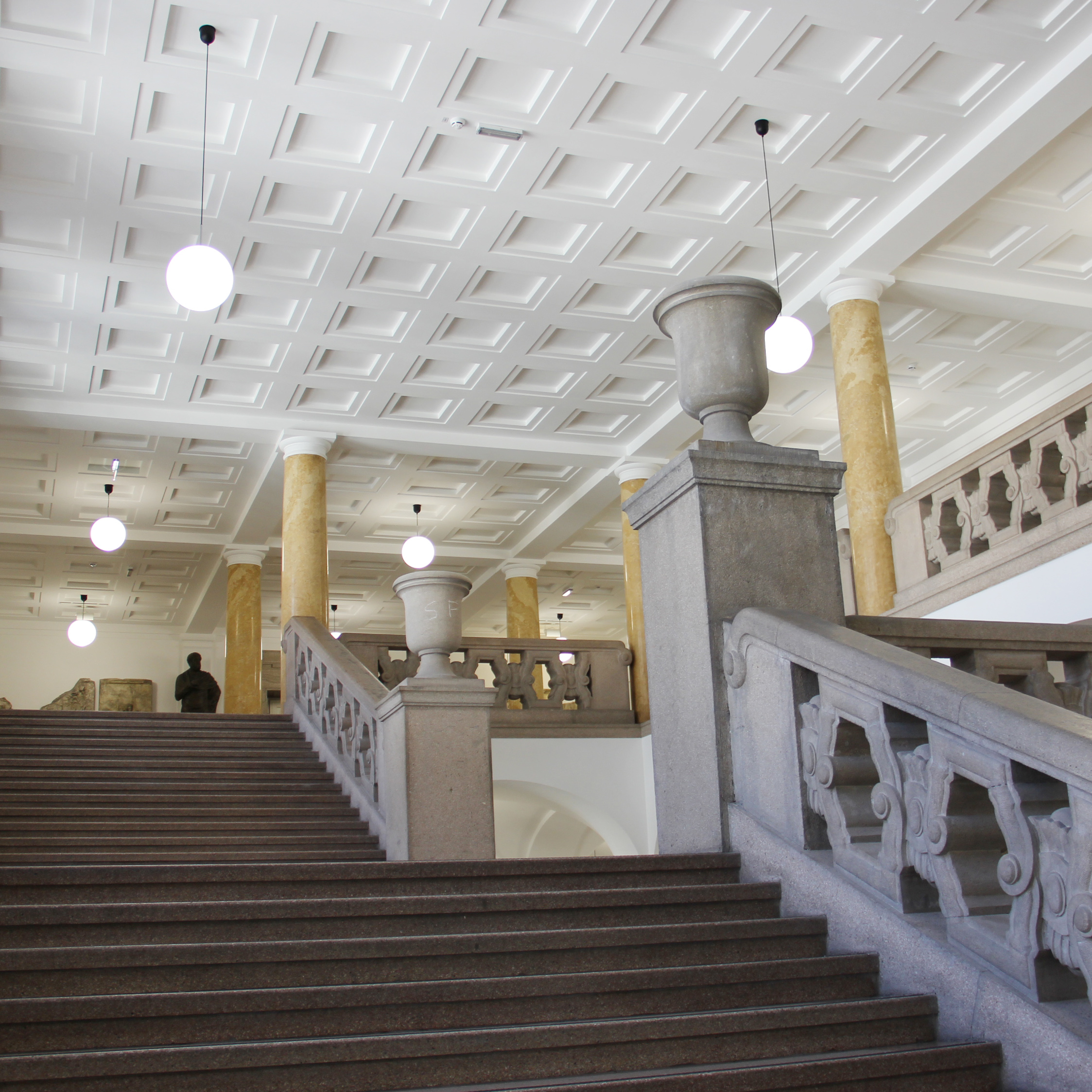
Im Hauptgebäude

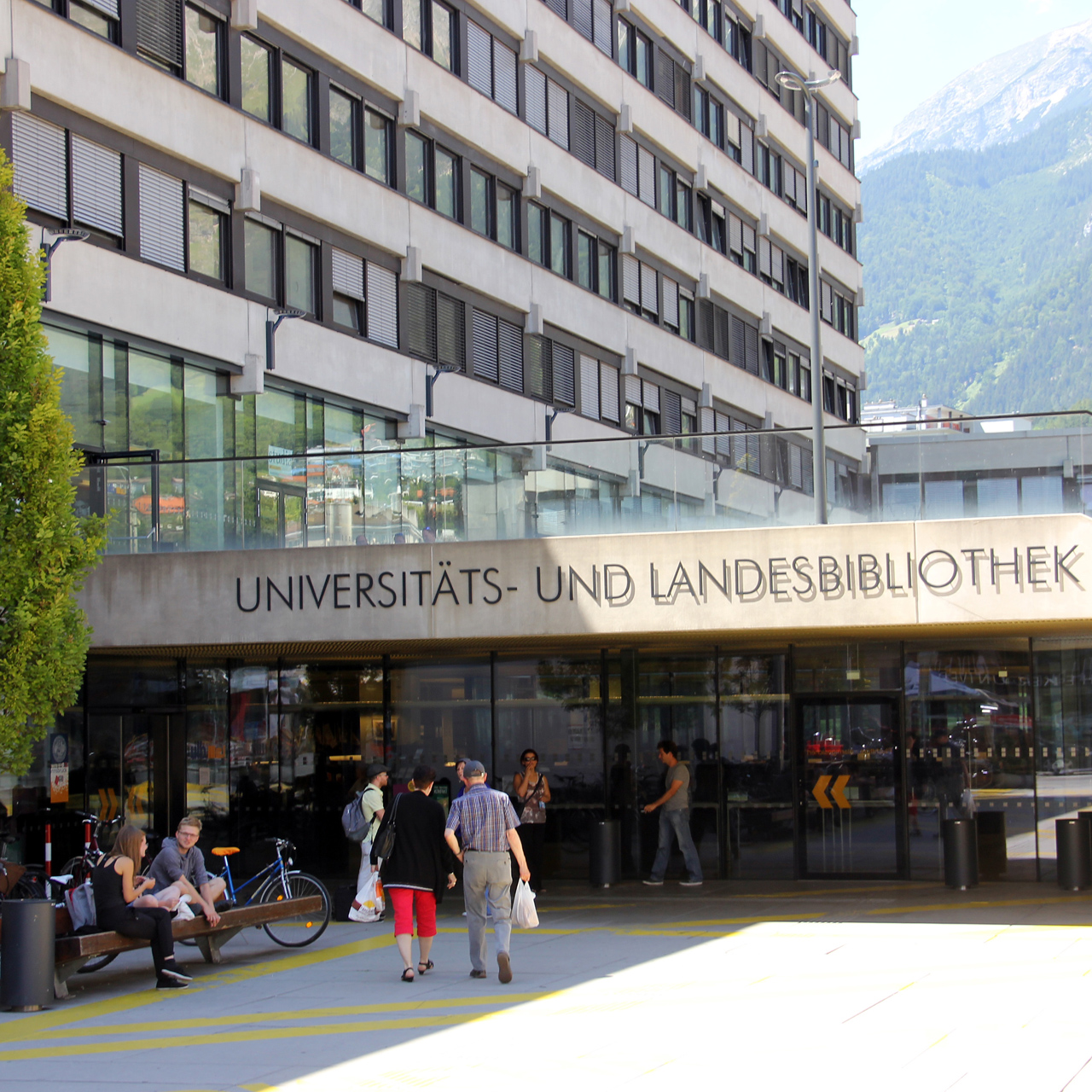
Universitäts- und Landesbibliothek

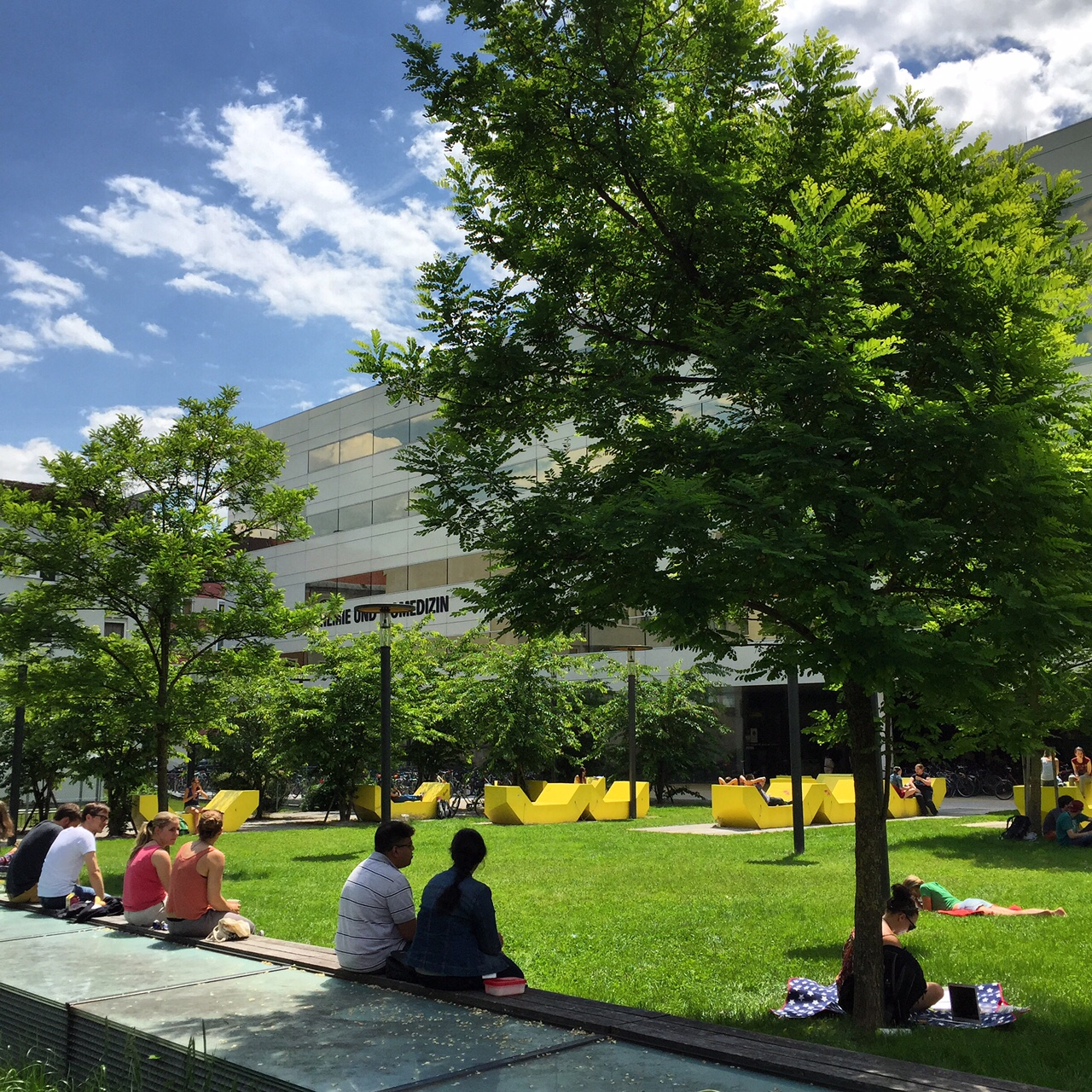
Das Centrum für Chemie und Biomedizin (CCB)

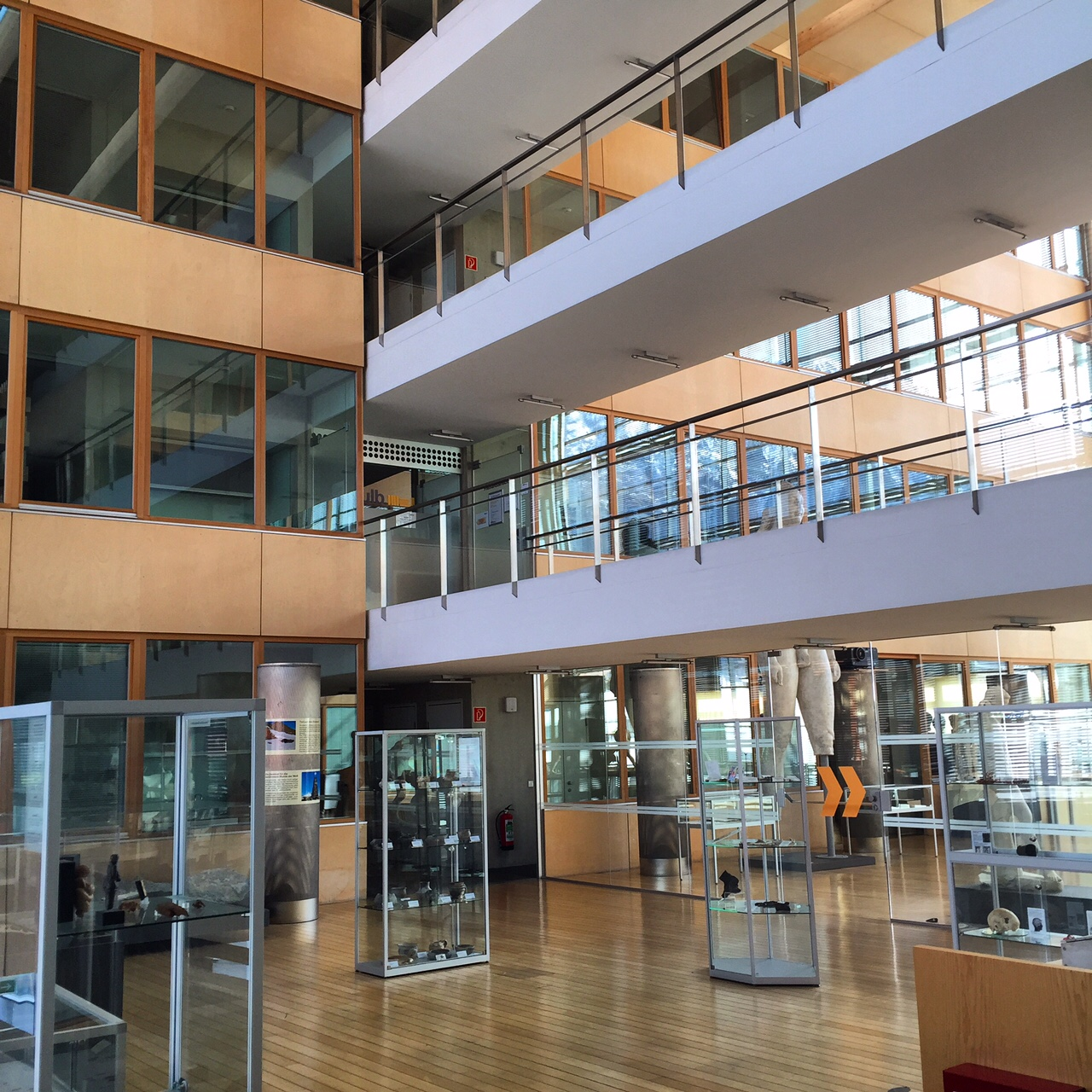
Das Zentrum für Alte Kulturen
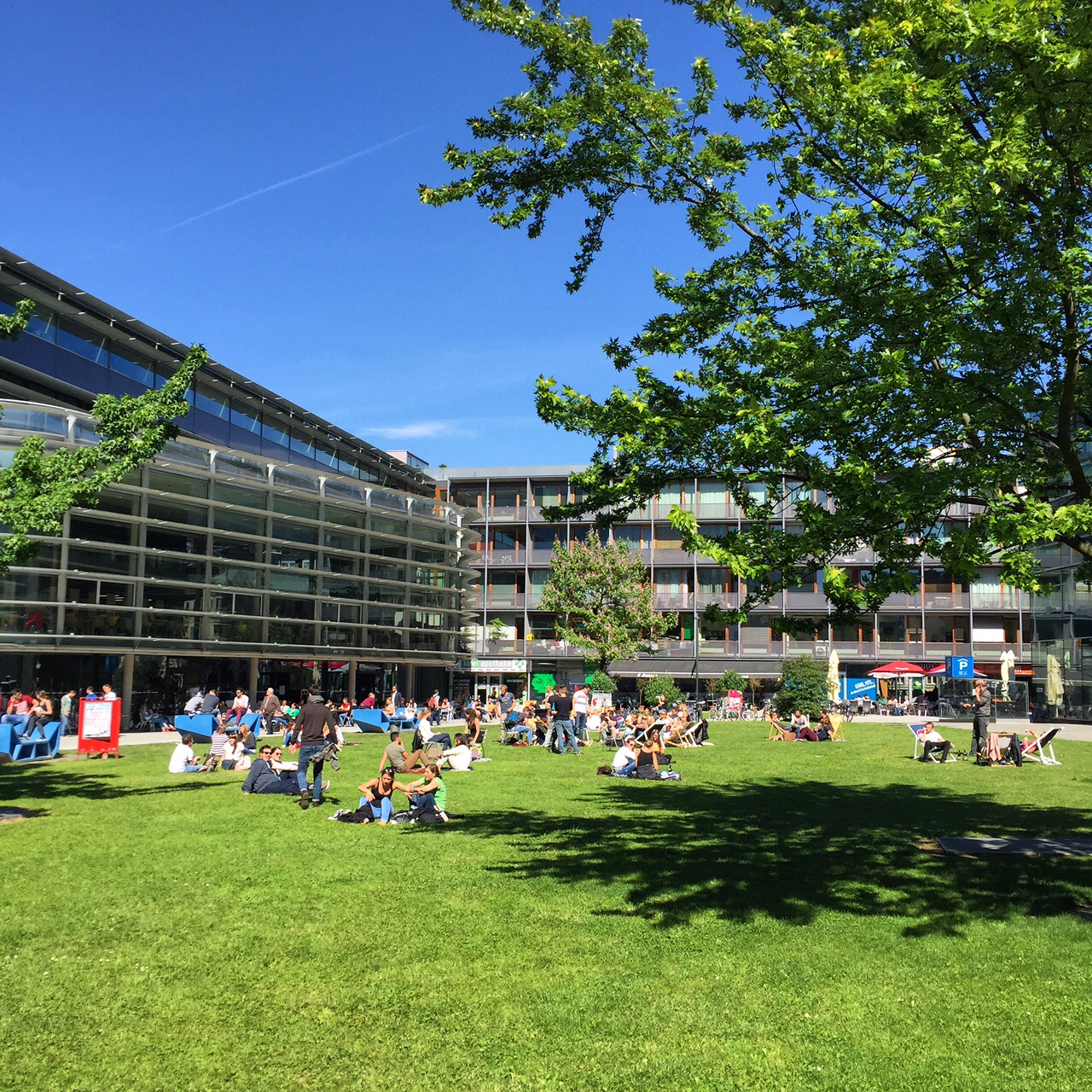
Die Sowi

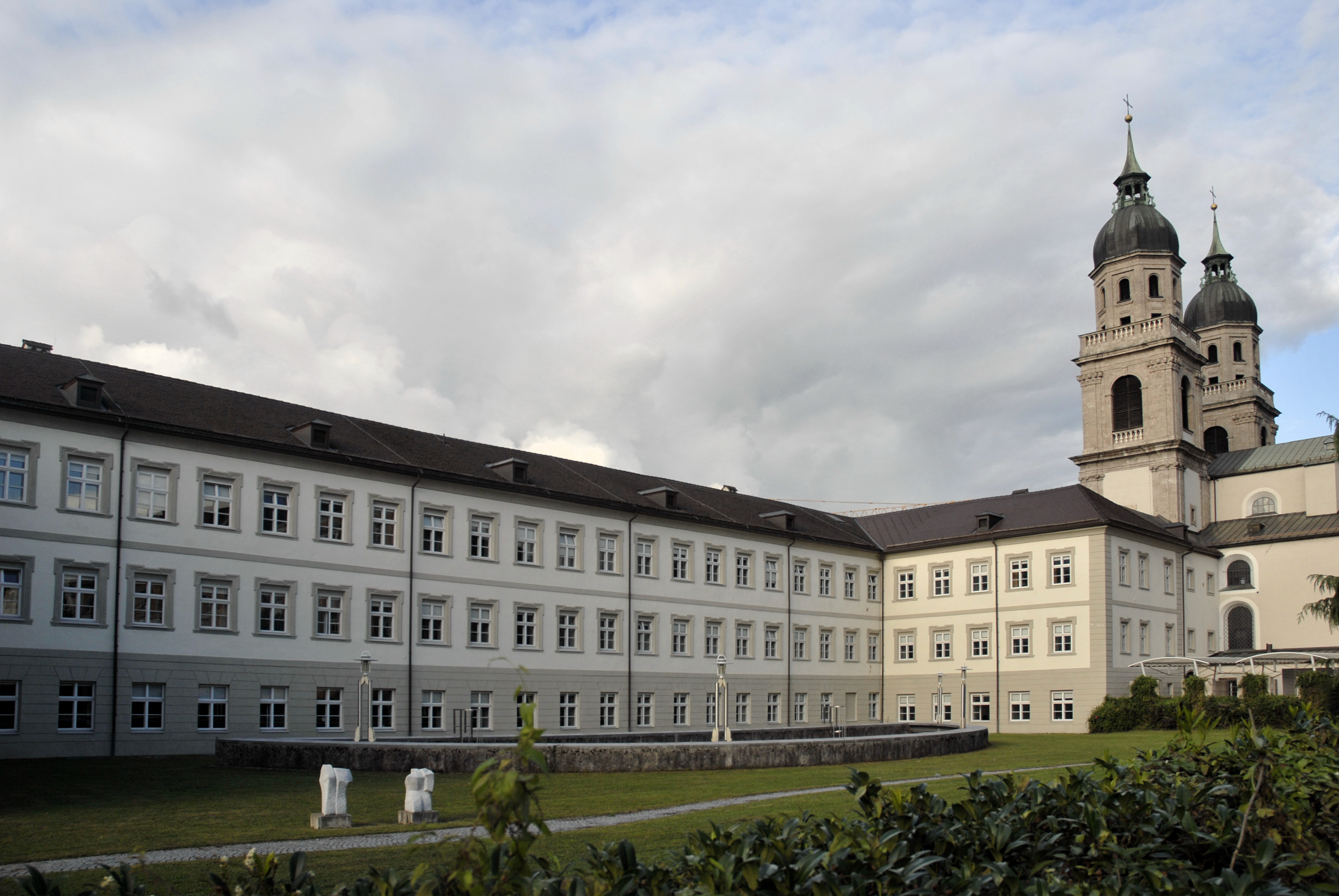
Theologische Fakultät

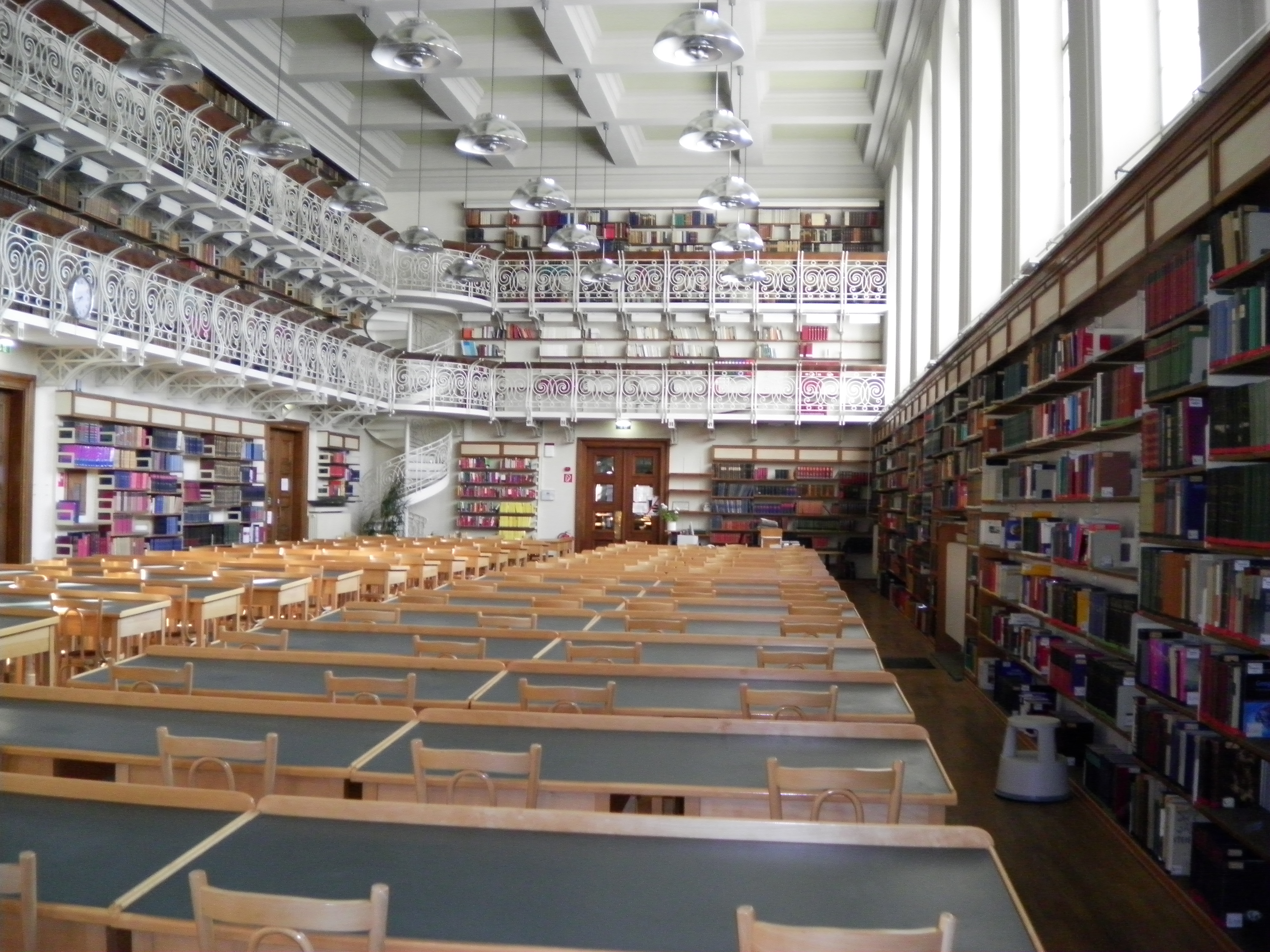
Lesesaal in der Universitätsbibliothek

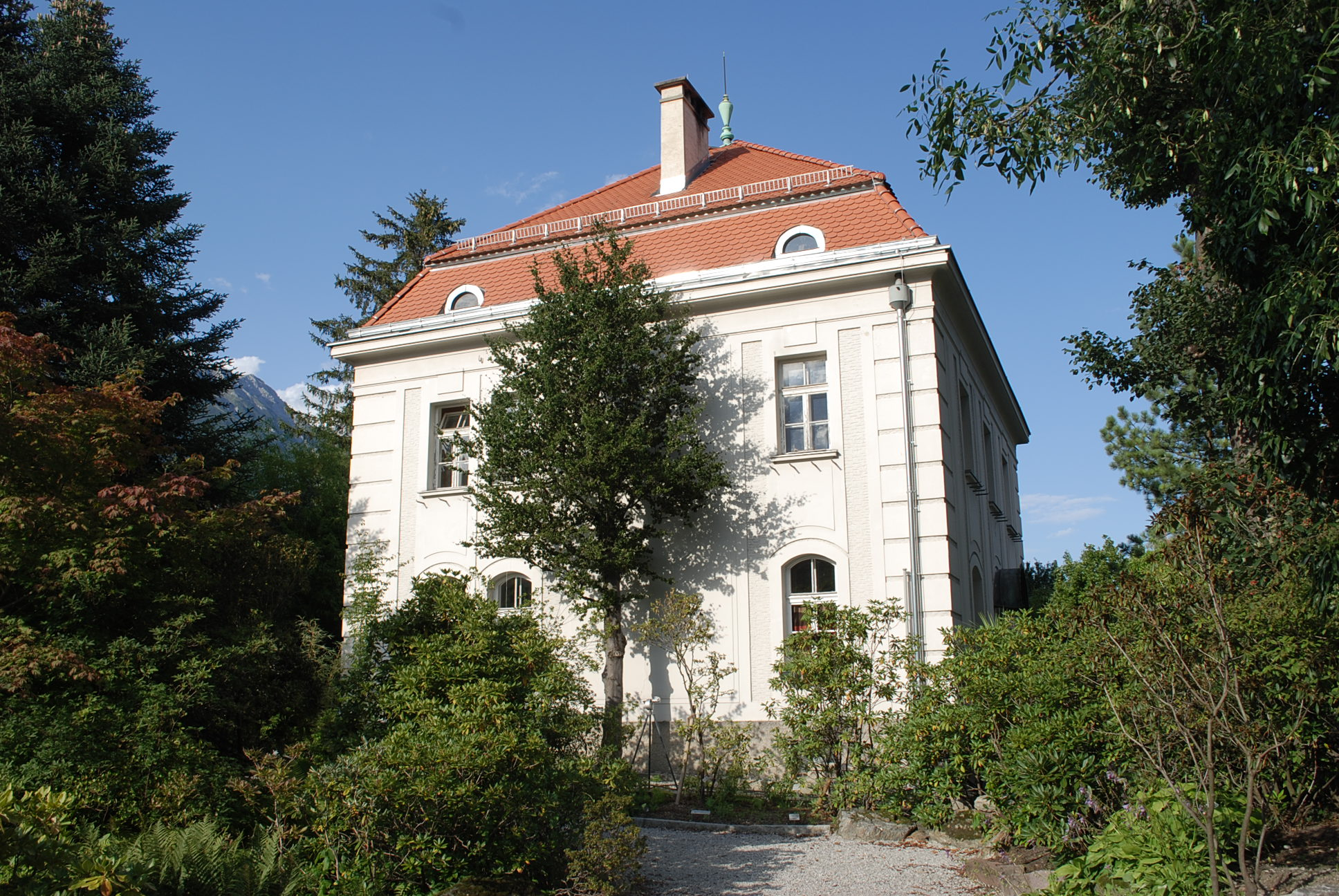
Im Botanischen Garten

== Points of interest ==
- Alpengarten Patscherkofel, the university's alpine garden atop Patscherkofel
- Botanischer Garten der Universität Innsbruck, the university's botanical garden

== Nobel laureates ==
- Anton Zeilinger (Physics 2022)
- Victor Franz Hess (Physics 1936)
- Hans Fischer (Chemistry 1930)
- Adolf Windaus (Chemistry 1928)
- Fritz Pregl (Chemistry 1923)
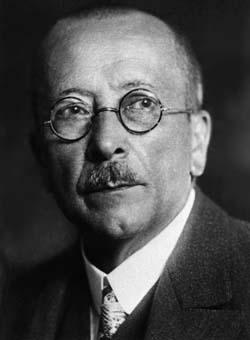
Fritz Pregl

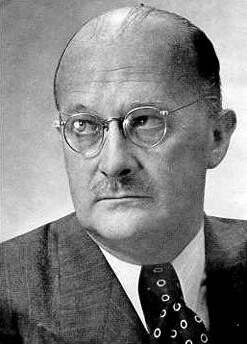
Adolf Windaus

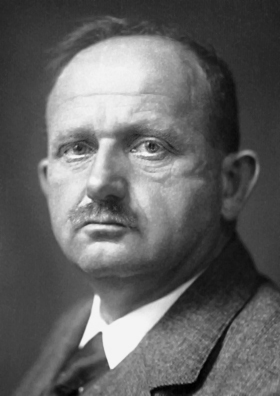
Hans Fischer

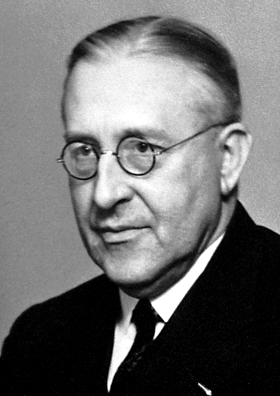
Victor Franz Hess

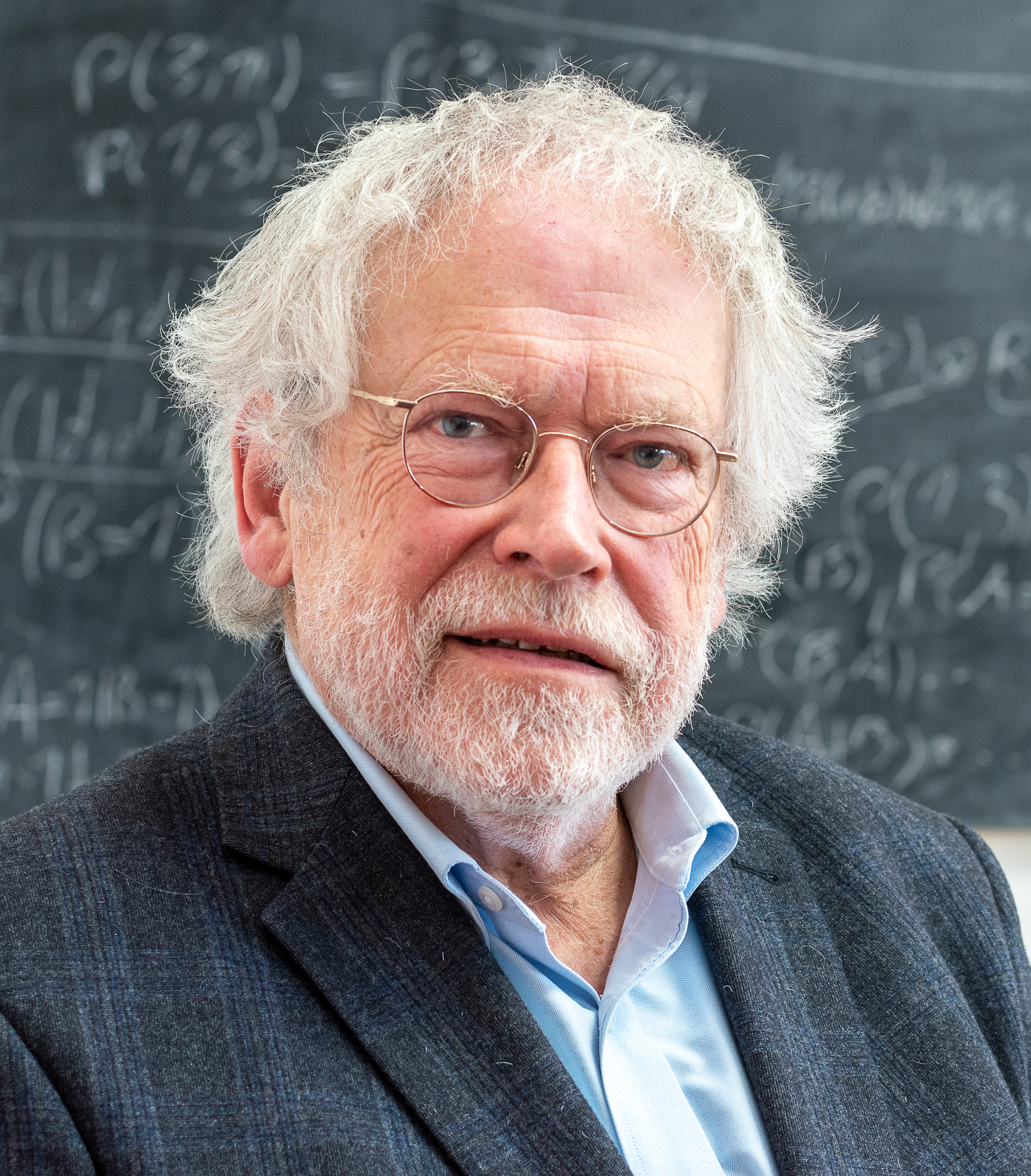
Anton Zeilinger

== Notable faculty ==
- Clemens August Andreae, professor and economist
- Eugen von Böhm-Bawerk, economist
- Wilhelm Ehmann, musicologist
- Karl Rahner, theologian
- Anton Pelinka, professor of political science
- Leopold Vietoris, mathematician and oldest verified Austrian man.
- Anton Zeilinger, physicist
- Peter Zoller, physicist
- Rainer Blatt, physicist

== Notable alumni ==
- Josef Aschbacher, president of European space agency (ESA)
- James Demske, S.J., president of Canisius College (1966–1993)
- Andreas Benedict Feilmoser, theologian
- Walter Guggenberger, Austrian civil servant and politician
- Maria Luise Thurmair, hymnwriter
- Alexander van der Bellen, President of Austria
- Josef Hoop, Prime Minister of Liechtenstein (1928-1945)
- Herbert Willi (born 1956) composer
- Armin Wolf, journalist
- Matthias Strolz, founder and first chairman of the political party NEOS
- Ivo Sanader, ex-prime Minister of Croatia
- Alois Negrelli, engineer that developed the Suez Canal.
- Günther Rupprechter, head of the Institute of Materials Chemistry, Technische Universität Wien (TU Wien)
- Johann Baptist Metz, theologian

== Victims of political persecution and terror ==
- Ludwig Wahrmund was professor of Canon Law in 1908 who was ousted from his post following critical remarks about the Catholic Church's interference in academic freedom.
- Christoph Probst (born 6 November 1919 in Murnau am Staffelsee : executed 22 February 1943 in Munich) was a student of medicine and a member of the White Rose (Weiße Rose) resistance group.
- Ignacio Ellacuría, S.J. (Portugalete, Biscay, Spain, 9 November 1930 – San Salvador, 16 November 1989) was a Roman Catholic Jesuit priest, philosopher, and theologian. Ignacio Ellacuría was a close friend and colleague of the scholars Ignacio Martín-Baró and Segundo Montes, all of whom were assassinated with Ellacuría by the Salvadoran army, along with three colleagues and two employees. He earned his master's degree at Innsbruck University.
- Segundo Montes, S.J. (Valladolid, Spain, 15 May 1933 – San Salvador, El Salvador, 16 November 1989) was a scholar, philosopher, educator, sociologist and Jesuit priest. Segundo Montes was a close friend and colleague of the scholars Ignacio Martín-Baró and Ignacio Ellacuría, all of whom were murdered with Montes by the Salvadoran army, along with three other colleagues and two other employees. He earned his master's degree at Innsbruck.
- Kurt von Schuschnigg (1897–1977) was Austria's chancellor and was imprisoned until 1945 after the anschluss (1938).

== See also ==
- List of early modern universities in Europe
