= TAM Transportes Aéreos Regionais Flight 402 =

1996 aviation accident in Brazil

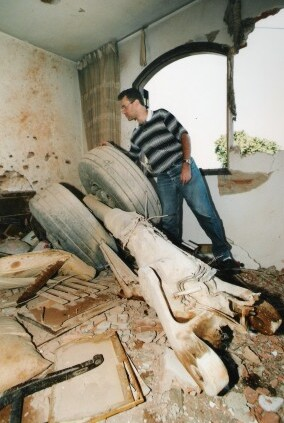
- The landing gear of the aircraft found in a house after the accident

Accident
- Date: 31 October 1996
- Summary: Uncommanded thrust reverser deployment after takeoff and pilot error sending full power into the reversed engine, leading to loss of control
- Site: Jabaquara, near São Paulo–Congonhas Airport, São Paulo, Brazil; 23°38′46″S 46°38′51″W
- Total fatalities: 99

Aircraft
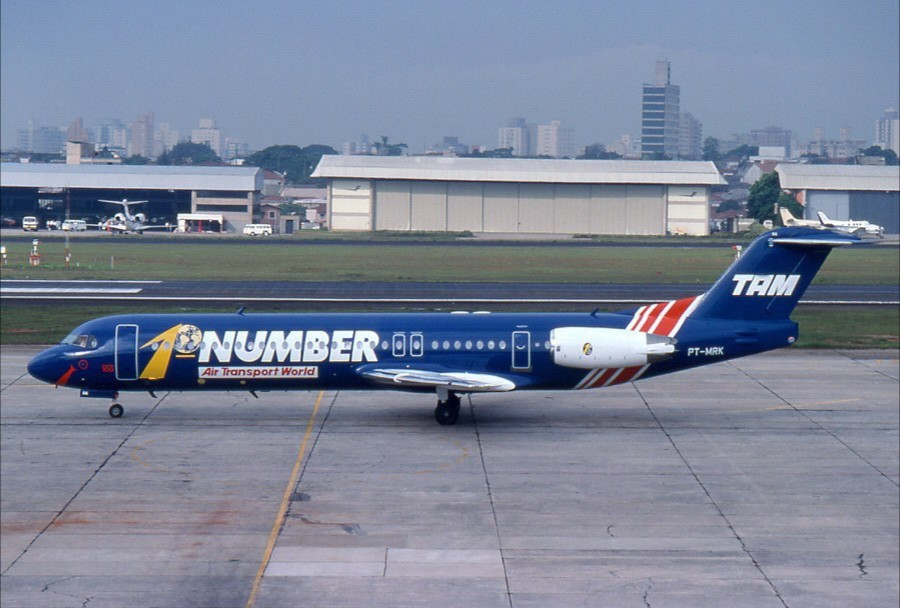
- PT-MRK, the aircraft involved in the accident, photographed in March 1996
- Aircraft type: Fokker 100
- Operator: TAM Transportes Aéreos Regionais
- IATA flight No.: JJ402
- ICAO flight No.: TAM402
- Call sign: TAM 402
- Registration: PT-MRK
- Flight origin: Hugo Cantergiani Regional Airport, Caxias do Sul, Brazil
- 1st stopover: São Paulo–Congonhas Airport, São Paulo, Brazil
- Last stopover: Santos Dumont Airport, Rio de Janeiro, Brazil
- Destination: Recife International Airport, Recife, Brazil
- Occupants: 95
- Passengers: 89
- Crew: 6
- Fatalities: 95
- Survivors: 0

Ground casualties
- Ground fatalities: 4

TAM Transportes Aéreos Regionais Flight 402 was a scheduled domestic flight from Caxias do Sul, Brazil, to Recife International Airport in Recife, via São Paulo–Congonhas International Airport and Santos Dumont Airport in Rio de Janeiro. On 31 October 1996, at 08:27 (UTC-2), the thrust reverser was accidentally deployed on the starboard engine of the Fokker 100 operating the route while the aircraft was climbing away from runway 17R at Congonhas. The aircraft stalled and rolled beyond control to the right, then struck two buildings and crashed into several houses in a heavily populated area only 25 seconds after takeoff. All 95 people on board were killed, as well as another 4 on the ground. It is the fourth deadliest accident in Brazilian aviation history, the second at the time. It is also the deadliest aviation accident involving a Fokker 100.

== Background ==
=== Aircraft ===
The aircraft involved was a Fokker 100 with the registration PT-MRK. It was delivered to TAM in 1993, and was painted in a special livery to commemorate being awarded best regional carrier by Air Transport World.

=== Crew ===
The captain was 35-year-old José Antonio Moreno, who had more than 9,000 hours of flight experience, including 3,000 hours on the Fokker 100. He graduated from Mogi-Mirim Airclub, situated in São Paulo, in 1987. The first officer was 27-year-old Ricardo Luis Gomes, who had 4,000 flight hours, with 160 of them on the Fokker 100. He graduated from Rio Claro Airclub, in São Paulo in 1988. There were also five flight attendants on board.

== Accident ==
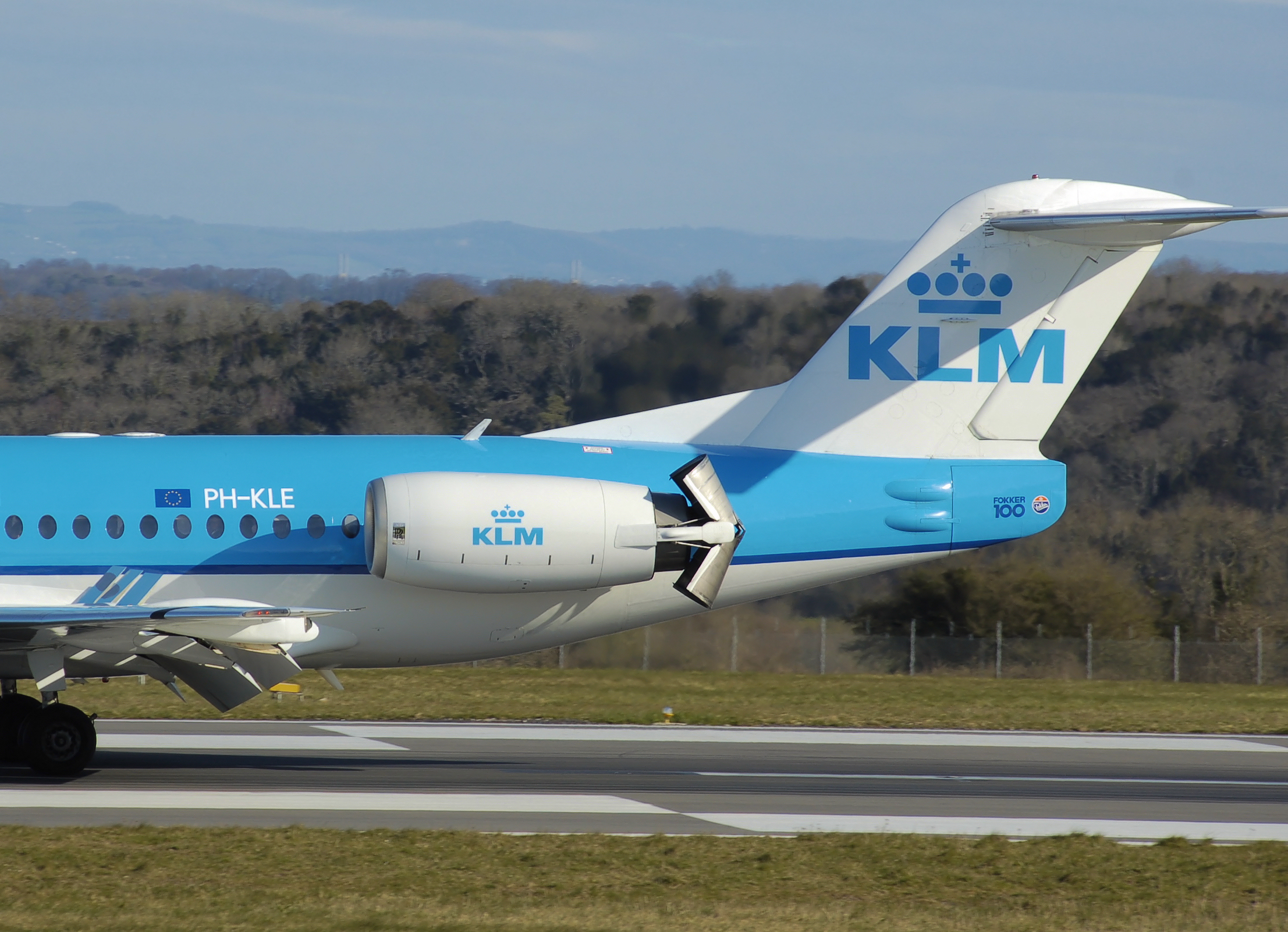
Rolls-Royce Tay 650-15 on a Fokker 100 of a type similar to the accident aircraft, with thrust reverser actuated.

The safety system cable, responsible for pulling the power lever to the idle position, was no longer able to withstand the physical strain of being pulled one way by the actuator, while the copilot forced it the other way by pushing the throttle lever to the fully open position — the cable soon parted at a maintenance connection. With the lever no longer restrained by the safety system, the copilot continued to hold the right throttle fully open. The combination of the right engine at full thrust in reverse and the left engine still at normal forward take-off thrust caused the aircraft to roll violently to the right and descend into the ground.

== Dramatization ==
The crash was featured in the 15th season of the television documentary series Mayday in an episode titled "Carnage in São Paulo".

== See also ==
- Lauda Air Flight 004, an accident involving in-flight thrust reverser deployment.
- Pacific Western Airlines Flight 314, an accident involving in-flight thrust reverser deployment.
- TAROM Flight 371, an accident caused by auto-throttle failure.
- Sriwijaya Air Flight 182, an accident caused by auto-throttle failure after takeoff.
