= Adolf Wahrmund =

German-Austrian orientalist (1827–1913)

Adolf Wahrmund (German pronunciation: [ˈaːdɔlf ˈvaːɐ̯mʊnt]; 10 June 1827 – 15 May 1913) was an Austrian-German orientalist.

== Biography ==
He was born in Wiesbaden, Germany, and died in Vienna. He studied at Göttingen and Vienna. From 1853 until 1861, he was at the Hofbibliothek in Vienna. From 1871 he taught Arabic at the Orientalischen Akademie in Wien (Oriental Academy of Vienna), and was at the head of that institution from 1885 until 1897. He fathered professor of Canon Law Ludwig Wahrmund. Adolf Wahrmund was responsible for purchasing the bulk of the collection of the Austrian National Ethnographic Museum, and thus may be considered its founder.

== Antisemitism ==
Wahrmund was a passionate antisemite. In Das Gesetz des Nomadenthums und die heutige Judenherrschaft ("The Law of the Nomad and Today's Jewish Dominion," 1887) he systematically compares the Jews to the Arab nomads of the Arabian deserts, on the assumption, then common, that the Jews of Europe (as well as of the rest of the world) were racial relatives of the Arab Semites, and thus alien to the "Aryan" West. Both, he suggests, aim to prosper by raiding and robbing. In one passage, he compares stock market raids by Jewish speculators to raids on desert caravans. The Jews, like the Arabs, aim at world domination, thus facing the beneficial (as Wahrmund sees it) aims of western imperialism. Wahrmund's solution is to deport Europe's Jews to areas set aside only for them. He believes that once they find themselves without others to attack, the Jews will "rip each other apart."

== Writings ==
- Die christliche Schule und das Judenthum ("The Christian school and the Jews," 1885)
- Das Gesetz des Nomadenthums (1887)
- Der Kulturkampf zwischen Asien und Europa ("The clash of cultures between Asia and Europe," 1887)
- Das Reich der Zwecke ("The realm of the tack," 1895)
- Handwörterbuch der neuarabischen und deutschen Sprache, 3 volumes ("Pocket Dictionary of the Arab and German Languages," 1874–1877)
- Praktisches Handbuch der neupersischen Sprache ("Practical Handbook of the Persian Language," 1875)
- Praktisches Handbuch der osmanisch-türkischen Sprache ("Practical Handbook of the Turkish Language," 1884)
- Also dramas and poems
