= List of Douglas DC-8 operators =

The following is a list of past and present operators of the Douglas DC-8 ♠ - Denotes original DC-8 operators

== Civil operators ==
Canada

- Air Canada (fleet included converted Super DC-8-73 aircraft operated by Air Canada Cargo)
- Trans-Canada Airlines ♠ (became Air Canada)

Central African Republic

- Air Centrafrique

Colombia

- ARCA Colombia (Aerovias Colombianas, Ltda)
- LAC Colombia (Líneas Aéreas del Caribe)
- Tampa Cargo

Democratic Republic of the Congo (formerly Zaire)

- Air Zaïre (also its predecessor Air Congo (1961))

Dominican Republic

- AGRO Air International

France

- Minerve
- UTA ♠

Germany

- German Cargo

Iceland

- Loftleidir (DC-8 aircraft also operated by subsidiary International Air Bahama)

Ireland

- Aer Turas

Ivory Coast

- Air Afrique ♠

Jamaica

- Air Jamaica

New Zealand

- Air New Zealand ♠
- TEAL (TEAL became Air New Zealand)

Philippines

- Philippine Airlines ♠

Scandinavia (Denmark, Norway, Sweden)

- Scanair
- Scandinavian Airlines System ♠

Spain

- Aviaco
- Cargosur
- Iberia Airlines ♠
- Spantax
- Trabajos Aéreos y Enlaces (TAE)

Sri Lanka (formerly Ceylon)

- Air Ceylon

Switzerland

- Balair
- SATA (SA de Transport Aérien)
- Swissair ♠

Thailand

- Thai Airways International

United Kingdom

- IAS Cargo Airlines
- Transmeridian Air Cargo

United States

- Saturn Airways ♠
- Seaboard World Airlines ♠

Venezuela

- VIASA ♠

== Military and government operators ==
Democratic Republic of the Congo

- Congolese Air Force - One remained in use in late 2016.

France

- French Air Force

Gabon

- Government of Gabon (TR-LTZ, DC-8-73F)

Spain

- Spanish Air Force (two DC-8-52 for VIP use)

Oman

- Government of Oman (A40-HMQ, DC-8-73F)

Peru

- Peruvian Air Force (two DC-8-62-CFs purchased in 1982–83 for the Presidential flight.)

Thailand

- Royal Thai Air Force (two DC-8-62AFs acquired in 1982. Locally designated B.L.10 (Thai: บ.ล.๑๐).)

Togo

- Government of Togo (operated by BTL - Base de Transport de Lomé)

United States

- NASA (N817NA, DC-8-72)
- United States Navy (163050 EC-24A (DC-8-54F))

== Bibliography ==
- "Andean Air Power...The Peruvian Air Force". Air International, May 1988. Vol. 34, No. 5. pp. 224–235, 240.
- Francillon, Rene J., McDonnell Douglas Aircraft since 1920, Putnam & Company Ltd, 1979, ISBN 0-370-00050-1.
- Pocock, Chris. Thailand Hones its Air Defences". Air International, Volume 31, No. 3, September 1986. pp. 113–121, 168.
- World Airline Fleets 1979, Endres, Günter G., Hounslow, UK: Airline Publications and Sales Ltd., 1979. ISBN 0-905117-53-0.
