= Pacific Western Airlines Flight 314 =

1978 aviation accident in Canada

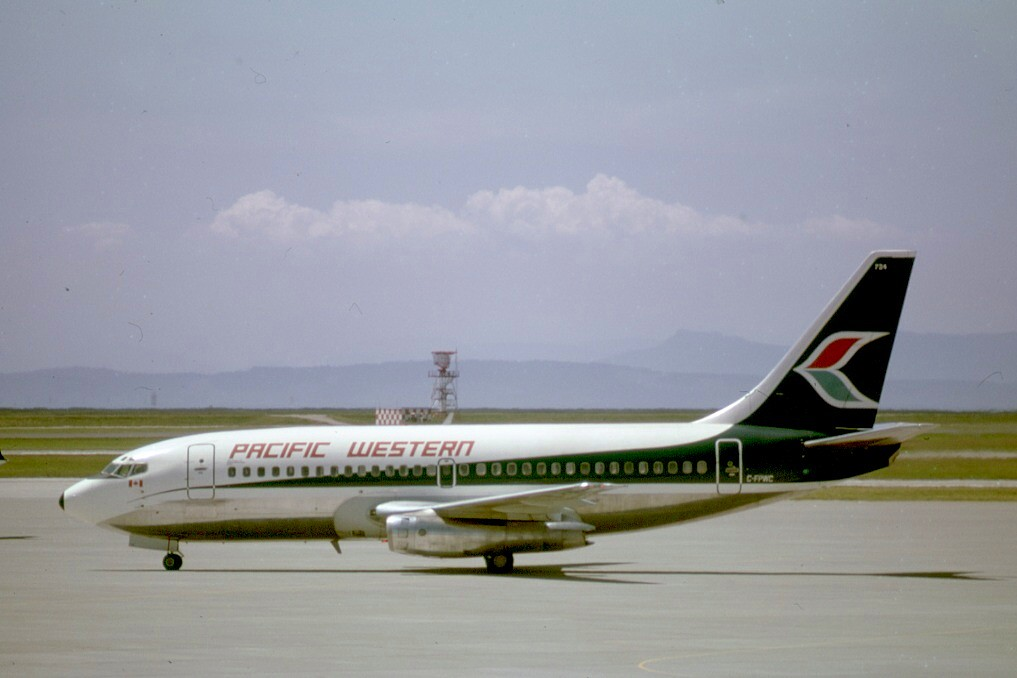
- C-FPWC, the aircraft involved in the accident, seen in 1976

Accident
- Date: 11 February 1978
- Summary: Runway incursion caused by pilot error and ATC error, thrust reverser deployment during go-around
- Site: Cranbrook/Canadian Rockies International Airport, Cranbrook, British Columbia, Canada; 49.6114°N 115.78225°W

Aircraft
- Aircraft type: Boeing 737-275
- Operator: Pacific Western Airlines
- IATA flight No.: PW314
- ICAO flight No.: PWA314
- Call sign: PACIFIC WESTERN 314
- Registration: C-FPWC
- Flight origin: Fort McMurray International Airport
- 1st stopover: Edmonton International Airport
- 2nd stopover: Calgary International Airport
- Last stopover: Cranbrook/Canadian Rockies International Airport
- Destination: Castlegar Airport
- Occupants: 49
- Passengers: 44
- Crew: 5
- Fatalities: 43
- Injuries: 5
- Survivors: 6

On 11 February 1978, Pacific Western Airlines Flight 314, a Boeing 737-200, crashed at Cranbrook/Canadian Rockies International Airport, near Cranbrook, British Columbia, Canada, killing 43 of the 49 people on board.

The scheduled flight from Fort McMurray International Airport to Castlegar Airport via Edmonton, Alberta, Calgary, Alberta and Cranbrook, British Columbia crashed after its thrust reversers did not fully stow following an aborted landing to avoid a snowplow on the runway. Calgary air traffic control was in major error in its calculation of the flight's arrival time at Cranbrook, and the flight crew did not report while passing a beacon on final approach.

== Aircraft and crew ==
The aircraft involved was a Boeing 737-275 that was nearly eight years old at the time of the accident. It was powered by two Pratt & Whitney JT8D-9A turbofan engines.

The captain was 30-year-old Chris Miles, who had been with Pacific Western Airlines since 1967 and became a Boeing 737 captain 10 years later in 1977. He had 5,173 flight hours, including 2,780 hours on the Boeing 737. The first officer was 25-year-old Peter Vanoort, who had been with the airline since 1971 and became a 737 first officer in December 1977. He was less experienced, having logged 1,316 flight hours, 81 of them on the Boeing 737.

== Accident ==
Flight 314 departed Calgary at 12:32 on an estimated 23-minute flight to Cranbrook. This estimate was passed to Cranbrook by Calgary Air Traffic Control. Cranbrook was not a controlled airport, and while it had an "aero-radio" station to provide weather and advisory information to aircraft, it had no control tower or air traffic controllers. As it was snowing, equipment operator Terry George was sent out to clear the runway with a snowplow, to be called off the runway shortly before Flight 314's arrival.

As Flight 314 neared Cranbrook airport, it was snowing with a visibility of 3/4 mile (about 1.2 km). The Cranbrook aero-radio operator advised George of the estimated arrival of Flight 314 at 13:05. Flight 314 was expected to report on the approach when passing the "Skookum Beacon", which would give about seven minutes' notice of arrival at Cranbrook. At 12:46, Flight 314 contacted Cranbrook aero-radio and was passed the latest weather and runway information. One minute later, Cranbrook aero-radio advised Flight 314 that there was a snowplow out on the runway removing snow. Vanoort acknowledged this with "Three Fourteen checks".

Upon passing the Skookum beacon, Captain Miles elected not to do a customary circle and proceeded for a straight-in approach into Runway 16 at Cranbrook. For reasons unknown, the pilots did not report passing the beacon, nor did they report that they were on final approach, which meant that the aero-radio operator believed the flight would arrive at 13:05 and did not call George off the runway. At 12:55, 10 minutes before their estimated time of arrival at Cranbrook, flight 314 touched down about 800 feet (240 m) from the runway threshold. The pilots did not see the snowplow due to the poor visibility and because the snowplow produced a plume of snow that obscured it. Captain Miles brought the throttles to idle and engaged reverse thrust, deploying the two thrust reversers, but two seconds later saw the snowplow about 1,000 feet (300 m) ahead of him. George saw in his rearview mirror the 737 coming straight at him and swerved to get out of its way, but did not have enough time. To avoid a fatal collision, Miles immediately disengaged reverse thrust and both pilots slammed the throttle levers all the way forward and pulled back on their control columns to abort the 737's landing and initiate a go-around. They pushed so hard on the throttles that Miles fractured his thumb. George radioed, "Where the hell did he come from?". The aero-radio operator responded, "I don't know Terry, but he sure didn't call after his first call." The aircraft passed a few meters above the snowplow and flew down the runway at a height of 50 to 70 feet (15 to 21 m).

When reverse thrust was cancelled, the plane lifted off so rapidly that the hydraulic isolation valve in the left thrust reverser closed, cutting off power to the actuator, with the reverser doors 2 inches (5 cm) open and the isolation valve in the partially open position. About six seconds after going around and 4,000 feet (1,200 m) from the runway threshold, as the aircraft climbed through 300 to 400 feet (91 to 122 m) and the airspeed increased, aerodynamic forces caused the left thrust reverser to deploy, causing the plane to yaw hard to the left, making the plane very difficult to fly and the airspeed greatly decayed. Flight 314 was now in a high drag configuration close to the ground, at a low speed, and with a deployed thrust reverser. Evidence indicates that First Officer Van Oort took off his seatbelt and stood up to flick the reverser override switch, which would restore hydraulic pressure to the reverser to close it. He raised the flaps from 40° to 15°, but the landing gear remained locked in the down position. Van Oort managed to open the safety cap to the switch, but Captain Miles (possibly because of the intense pain of his fractured thumb) let off the right rudder, throwing the co-pilot off balance and he never flipped the switch. By this point the airspeed had decayed so much that no amount of aileron or rudder would be enough to save the plane. Flight 314 banked steeply to the left from a height of 400 feet (120 m). Captain Miles shouted over the radio "We're gonna crash!". Ten seconds after going around, the 737 crashed to the left of the runway banked 90° to the left and 30° nose down. The aircraft was destroyed in the impact and subsequent fire with only the cockpit and the tail section remaining recognizable. George left the snowplow and with two firefighters rushed towards the crash site. They found six survivors including one flight attendant. One additional survivor was found in the forward section of the aircraft with a severe head injury, but died 11 days later. 43 people, including Miles and Van Oort, were killed in the crash.

== Investigation ==
The crash investigation was conducted by the Aviation Safety Investigation Division of Transport Canada and audited by the Aircraft Accident Review Board. The Cockpit Voice Recorder (CVR) was destroyed by the fire but the Flight Data Recorder (FDR) was usable although some parameters were unreadable. Boeing simulations showed that the aircraft was controllable with one engine at idle reverse and the other at full forward thrust in a gear up, flaps 15° configuration. With flaps 25 and gear down, it was not possible to maintain level flight. The go-around would have been successful if the left engine thrust reverser doors had not been deployed.

== In popular culture ==
The events of the crash featured in an episode of the History channel documentary Disasters of the Century, entitled "Collision Course".

== See also ==
- Lauda Air Flight 004
- TAM Transportes Aéreos Regionais Flight 402
