= Walter Guggenberger =

Austrian politician

Walter Guggenberger (born 23 August 1947 in Landeck) is an Austrian civil servant and politician (SPÖ). From 1983 to 1999, Guggenberger was a member of the National Council of Austria.

Guggenberger attended the elementary school from 1953 to 1957 and switched afterwards to the federal grammar school Landeck, where he passed his final exams. After this Guggenberger studied Jurisprudence at the University of Innsbruck and completed his degree with the academic grade Mag. jur. in 1972. He passed his court year in 1973 and since 1974 he is in the Civil Invalids’ Office of Tyrol which he leads since 1986. In 1994 he was appointed Privy Councillor.

Since 1980 Guggenberger is local councillor in Landeck and was member of the National Council from 1 December 1983 to 20 April 1999. Afterwards, from 30 March 1999 to 20 October 2003, Guggenberger was representative of the State Parliament of Tyrol and parliamentary party leader of SPÖ Tyrol. From 1995 Guggenberger was furthermore member of the country's party's executive of SPÖ Tyrol. In 1992 he founded with Andreas Hörtnagl and Andreas Maislinger the Austrian Holocaust Memorial Service. Guggenberger was awarded in 1992 the Grand Decoration of Honour in Silver for Services to the Republic of Austria and in 1999 the Grand Decoration of Honour in Gold for Services to the Republic of Austria by the National Council's President Heinz Fischer.
