= Ludwig Wahrmund =

Ludwig Wahrmund (German pronunciation: [ˈluːtvɪç ˈvaːɐ̯mʊnt]; 21 August 1860 – 10 September 1932) was an Austrian professor of Canon Law at the University of Innsbruck.

Ludwig was the son of Adolf Wahrmund, a noted anti-semite. However, Ludwig rose to prominence from a lecture he gave on 18 January 1908 in Innsbruck Town Hall entitled Catholic Weltanschauung and Free Science. The lecture was repeated in Salzburg and published as a pamphlet. Ludwig's criticism of the Catholic Church and their attempt to control education gave rise to the "Wahrmund Affair", which led to his removal from his professorial chair in Innsbruck.
