= Lauda Air Flight 004 =

1991 aircraft accident in Thailand

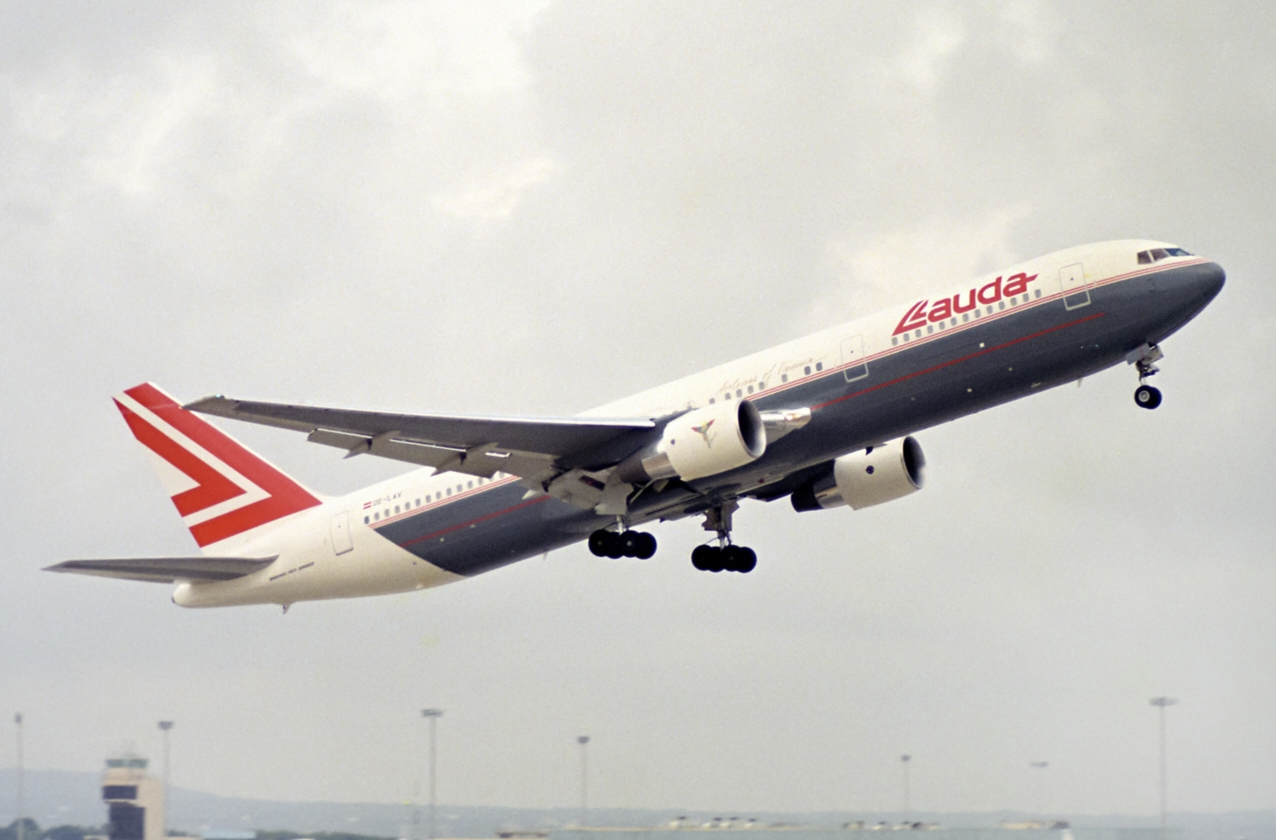
- OE-LAV, the aircraft involved in the accident, seen in 1990

Accident
- Date: 26 May 1991
- Summary: Loss of control following uncommanded thrust-reverser deployment leading to in-flight breakup
- Site: Phu Toei National Park, Suphan Buri province, Thailand; 14°56′48″N 99°27′10″E

Aircraft
- Aircraft type: Boeing 767-3Z9ER
- Aircraft name: Mozart
- Operator: Lauda Air
- IATA flight No.: NG004
- ICAO flight No.: LDA004
- Call sign: LAUDA 4
- Registration: OE-LAV
- Flight origin: Kai Tak Airport, British Hong Kong
- Stopover: Don Mueang International Airport, Bangkok, Thailand
- Destination: Vienna International Airport, Vienna, Austria
- Occupants: 223
- Passengers: 213
- Crew: 10
- Fatalities: 223
- Survivors: 0

Lauda Air Flight 004 was a regularly scheduled international passenger flight from Hong Kong, via Bangkok, Thailand, to Vienna, Austria. On 26 May 1991, the Boeing 767 operating the route crashed following an uncommanded deployment of the thrust reverser on the No. 1 engine during the climb phase, causing the aircraft to enter an aerodynamic stall, uncontrolled dive, and in-flight breakup, killing all 213 passengers and ten crew members on board. It is the deadliest aviation accident involving the Boeing 767, (Note: The crashes of both American Airlines Flight 11 and United Airlines Flight 175 are deadlier. However, both incidents are not considered as aviation accidents due to them being acts of terrorism as part of the September 11 attacks.) and the deadliest aviation accident in Thailand's history. The accident marked the 767's first fatal incident and third hull loss. Formula One world motor racing champion Niki Lauda, who founded and ran Lauda Air, was personally involved in the accident investigation.

== Aircraft ==
The aircraft involved was a Boeing 767-300ER, the 283rd Boeing 767 built, that was powered by Pratt & Whitney PW4060 engines and was delivered new to Lauda Air on 16 October 1989. The aircraft was registered OE-LAV and named Mozart. At the time of the incident, the No. 2 engine had been on the airframe since assembly of the aircraft (7,444 hours and 1,133 cycles) whereas the No. 1 engine (with the faulty thrust reverser) had been on the aircraft since October 3, 1990 and had accumulated 2,904 hours and 456 cycles.

== Accident ==
At the time of the accident, Lauda Air operated three weekly flights between Bangkok and Vienna. At 23:02 ICT on 26 May 1991, the Boeing 767-3Z9ER operating as Flight 004 (originating from Hong Kong's Kai Tak Airport) departed Don Mueang International Airport in Bangkok for its passenger service to Vienna International Airport with 213 passengers and 10 crew under the command of American captain Thomas John Welch (48) and Austrian first officer Josef Thurner (41). Both pilots were regarded as very competent. At 23:08, Welch and Thurner received a visual warning indication on the EICAS display that a possible system failure would cause the thrust reverser on the No. 1 engine to deploy in flight. After consulting the aircraft's Quick Reference Handbook, they determined that the alert was "coming on and off" and that it was "just an advisory thing". The pilots took no remedial action, possibly believing that the indication was false, but also with the knowledge that the 767 could land safely with only one operational reverser.

At 23:17, the No. 1 engine reverser deployed while the plane was over mountainous jungle terrain in the border area between the Suphan Buri and Uthai Thani provinces in Thailand. Thurner's last recorded words were "Oh, reverser's deployed." Moments later, the cockpit voice recorder (CVR) recorded a shuddering sound, followed closely by a snap. Due to the reverser design, an aerodynamic plume of air disrupted the airflow over the leading edge of the left wing during the engine's rundown to idle thrust, which resulted in a 25% loss of lift and an aerodynamic stall.

The aircraft immediately began a diving left turn. The CVR recorded master caution warning and a second snapping sound, followed by various alerts such as overspeed and a second master caution, and Welch's last recorded words: "Jesus Christ" in response to the rapid rolling sensation, "here, wait a minute" as he brought engine 1's thrust lever to idle and shut down the engine and finally, "damn it". Following this, the CVR recorded an increase in background wind noise followed by several loud bangs. Manoeuvring overloads produced by the pilots' sustained attempts to regain pitch control, in combination with the increasing velocity of the dive, had exceeded the aircraft's structural limits and destroyed the weakened aft fuselage along with the rest of the damaged flight surfaces. The loss of the tail caused further negative loading of the wings, as the airplane experienced Mach tuck and nosed over vertically, reaching a speed of at least Mach 0.99 (the highest value that the aircraft's sensors could record), breaking the sound barrier.

The wings then experienced structural failure and separated at the trailing edges, engulfing the remains of the falling aircraft in flames before impacting mountainous wooded terrain and exploding. Most of the wreckage was scattered over a remote forest area roughly 1 square kilometre (0.39 sq mi) in size, at an elevation of 600 m (2,000 ft), in what is now Phu Toei National Park, Suphan Buri. The wreckage site is about 6 kilometres (4 mi; 3 nmi) north-northeast of Phu Toey, Huay Kamin (Thai: ห้วยขมิ้น), Dan Chang district, Suphan Buri province, about 100 kilometres (62 mi; 54 nmi) northwest of Bangkok, close to the Burma-Thailand border. Rescuers found Welch's body still in the pilot's seat.

== Recovery ==
Volunteer rescue teams and local villagers looted the wreckage, taking electronics and jewellery, so relatives were unable to recover personal possessions. The bodies were taken to a hospital in Bangkok, but the storage was not refrigerated, and the bodies decomposed. Dental and forensic experts worked to identify bodies, but 27 were never identified.

Speculation circulated that a bomb may have destroyed the aircraft, as some eyewitnesses had reported seeing a large fireball surrounding the aircraft, the result of the disintegration of the right wing during the dive. However, a terrorist motive was believed unlikely, as Austria was politically neutral with a reputation of avoiding international conflicts such as the recent Gulf War.

== Investigation ==
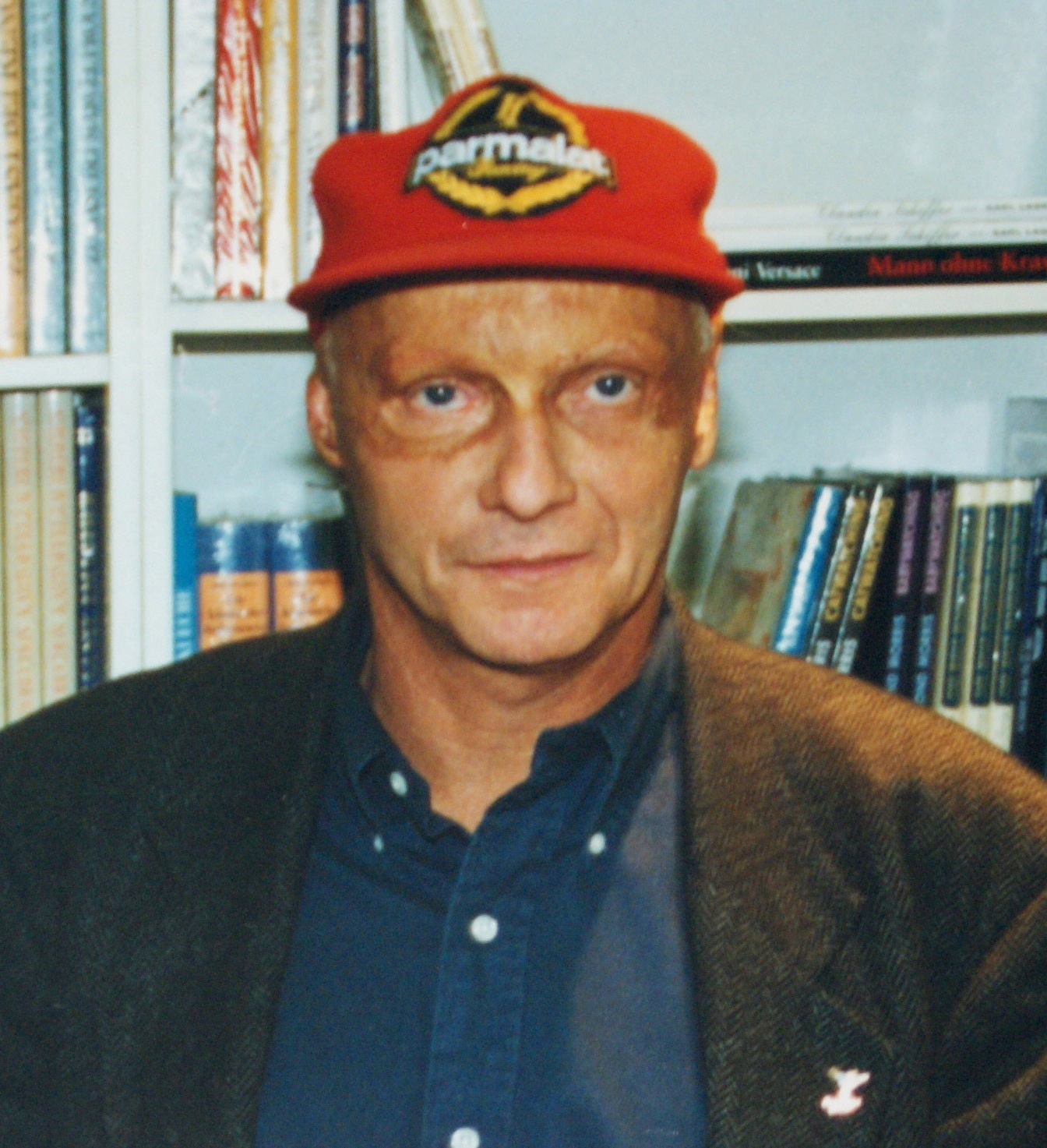
Niki Lauda travelled to Thailand to assist in the investigation.

The flight data recorder was completely destroyed, so only the cockpit voice recorder could be analysed. Thailand's Air Safety Division head Pradit Hoprasatsuk stated that "the attempt to determine why the reverser came on was hampered by the loss of the flight data recorder, which was destroyed in the crash". Upon hearing of the crash, Niki Lauda traveled to Thailand. He examined the wreckage and estimated that the largest fragment was about five metres (16 ft) by two metres (6.6 ft), which was about half the size of the largest piece resulting from the Lockerbie bombing. Lauda attended a funeral for 23 unidentified passengers in Thailand and then traveled to Seattle to meet with Boeing representatives.

The official investigation, led by Thailand's Aircraft Accident Investigation Committee, lasted approximately eight months and resulted in a conclusion of probable cause: "The Accident Investigation Committee of the Government of Thailand determines the probable cause of this accident to be [an] uncommanded in-flight deployment of the left engine thrust reverser, which resulted in loss of flight path control. The specific cause of the thrust reverser deployment has not been positively identified." Multiple possibilities were investigated, including a short circuit in the electrical system. However, the destruction of much of the wiring meant that investigators could not arrive at a definitive reason for the activation of the thrust reverser.

As evidence began to implicate the thrust reversers as the cause of the accident, Lauda conducted simulator flights at Gatwick Airport that appeared to show that deployment of a thrust reverser was a survivable condition. Lauda said that the thrust reverser could not be the sole cause of the crash. However, the accident report states that the "flight crew training simulators yielded erroneous results" and that recovery from the loss of lift from the reverser deployment "was uncontrollable for an unexpecting flight crew".

The incident prompted Boeing to modify the thrust-reverser system to prevent similar occurrences by adding sync locks, which prevent the thrust reversers from deploying when the main landing-gear truck-tilt angle is not at the ground position. Aviation writer Macarthur Job has stated that "had that Boeing 767 been of an earlier version of the type, fitted with engines that were controlled mechanically rather than electronically, then that accident could not have happened".

In parallel with the Thai accident commission’s investigation, the Vienna Public Prosecutor’s Office also conducted its own inquiry. When the Vienna Public Prosecutor’s Office seized documents from Lauda Air following the crash, it was found that dozens of pages were missing from the technical logbooks of the crashed aircraft. Former Lauda Air employees testified in 2026 that “hundreds of pages had been destroyed” . The Vienna Public Prosecutor’s Office also interviewed a former head of maintenance at Lauda Air. The man, Hanns Pekarek, stated for the record that he had repeatedly warned Niki Lauda that aircraft maintenance was no longer safe due to the intense pressure from management. According to Pekarek’s statements to the Vienna Public Prosecutor’s Office, Niki Lauda ignored these warnings. Pekarek therefore left the company eight months before the crash of OE-LAV and, fearing an accident, banned his entire family from flying with Lauda Air.

The Vienna Public Prosecutor’s Office commissioned the renowned expert Prof. Ernst Zeibig, DDipl. Ing., Dr. tech., to prepare an expert report. This report was completed as early as the early 1990s, but remained under wraps. A number of German journalists, as well as the Austrian news magazine ‘Profil’, had already raised the issue in the early 1990s. The Austrian flight safety expert and aviation journalist Patrick Huber quoted from it in specialist publications in 2011 and 2015 . It formed the basis of his non-fiction book ‘Lauda Air NG 004: The Last Flight of the “Mozart” – Austria’s Greatest Aviation Disaster’, published in German in January 2026. Professor Zeibig’s report clearly demonstrated Lauda Air’s shared responsibility for the crash. Whilst it did not dispute the design fault with the thrust reverser on Boeing’s part, the expert concluded that the aircraft involved in the accident, registration OE-LAV, should not have been allowed to fly at all since 25 January 1991. Professor Zeibig spent over a year reviewing the technical documentation for the aircraft involved in the accident. In doing so, he compared the relevant error messages with the actions taken by the Lauda Air maintenance team and then assessed the appropriateness of those measures. The expert appointed by the Vienna Public Prosecutor’s Office established beyond doubt that an error message relating to the left thrust reverser on OE-LAV was first documented on 28 December 1990. According to Boeing FIM, the aircraft should have been permitted to fly for a maximum of 500 hours with this fault. If the problem had not been rectified within this period, the aircraft would have had to be grounded. However, the Lauda Air maintenance team were never able to resolve the problem. In their attempts to rectify the fault, they repeatedly breached Boeing’s regulations. Expert Zeibig noted, among other things, “serious maintenance errors” and “serious deficiencies in the documentation” and concluded that the 500-hour period, which had begun on 28 December 1990, had expired on 25 January 1991. Nevertheless, Lauda Air sent the aircraft in question on a 39-hour rotation to Australia and back. This was a deliberate breach of Boeing regulations.

Until the crash on 26 May 1991, OE-LAV had flown for more than 2,000 hours with this fault in the left thrust reverser, which should have been rectified within 500 hours. According to Professor Zeibig, the cause of the problems and the thrust reverser activation was, “with a probability bordering on certainty”, damaged electrical cables in the area of the left engine strut. The Vienna public prosecutor responsible at the time explained that he had not charged those responsible at Lauda Air solely because these cables had been destroyed in the crash. He said: “Had I had these cables, Niki Lauda himself would have been the main defendant.” The prosecutor also stated quite clearly that the crash would not have happened if Lauda Air had followed the maintenance guidelines, taken OE-LAV out of service and carried out a thorough inspection of the left engine strut. In that case, the maintenance crew would have discovered the damaged cables and replaced them. Consequently, the thrust reverser would not have been activated in flight.

=== Previous testing of thrust reversers ===
When the U.S. Federal Aviation Administration (FAA) asked Boeing to test activating the thrust reverser in flight, the FAA had allowed Boeing to devise the tests. Boeing had insisted that a deployment was not possible in flight. In 1982, Boeing conducted a test in which the aircraft was flown at 10,000 feet (3,000 m), slowed to 250 knots (460 km/h; 290 mph; 130 m/s), and then the test pilots deployed the thrust reverser. The control of the aircraft was not jeopardized, and the FAA accepted the results of the test.

The Lauda aircraft was travelling at a TAS of 400 knots (740 km/h; 460 mph) at 24,700 feet (7,500 m) in the climb to 30,000 feet (9,100 m) when the left thrust reverser deployed, causing the pilots to lose control of the aircraft. James R. Chiles, author of Inviting Disaster, said: "[T]he point here is not that a thorough test would have told the pilots Thomas J. Welch and Josef Thurner what to do. A thrust reverser deploying in flight might not have been survivable, anyway. But a thorough test would have informed the FAA and Boeing that thrust reversers deploying in midair was such a dangerous occurrence that Boeing needed to install a positive lock that would prevent such an event."

== Passengers and crew ==
Nation	Passengers	Crew	Total
Austria	74	9	83
Hong Kong	52	0	52
Thailand	39	0	39
Italy	10	0	10
Switzerland	7	0	7
China	6	0	6
Germany	4	0	4
Portugal	3	0	3
Taiwan	3	0	3
Yugoslavia	3	0	3
United States	2	1 (Note: The captain.)	3
Hungary	2	0	2
Philippines	2	0	2
United Kingdom	2	0	2
Australia	1	0	1
Brazil	1	0	1
Poland	1	0	1
Turkey	1	0	1
Total	213	10	223

The passengers and crew included 83 Austrians: 74 passengers and 9 crew members. Other nationalities included 52 Hong Kong residents, 39 Thai, 10 Italians, 7 Swiss, 6 Chinese, 4 Germans, 3 Portuguese, 3 Taiwanese, 3 Yugoslavs, 2 Hungarians, 2 Filipinos, 2 Britons, 3 Americans (two passengers and the captain), 1 Australian, 1 Brazilian, 1 Pole and 1 Turk.

First officer Josef Thurner had once flown as a copilot with Niki Lauda on a Lauda Air Boeing 767 service to Bangkok, a flight that was the subject of a Reader's Digest article in January 1990 that depicted the airline positively. Macarthur Job stated that Thurner was the better known of the crew members. Captain Thomas J. Welch lived in Vienna but was originally from Seattle, Washington.

Notable victims included:

- Clemens August Andreae, an Austrian economics professor, was leading a group of students from the University of Innsbruck on a tour of the Far East.
- Pairat Decharin, the governor of Chiang Mai province, and his wife. Charles S. Ahlgren, the former U.S. consul general to Chiang Mai, said: "That accident not only took their lives and that of many of Chiang Mai's leaders, but dealt a blow to many development and planning activities in the town."
- Princess Phongkaeo of Chiang Mai (Chet Ton dynasty).

== Aftermath ==
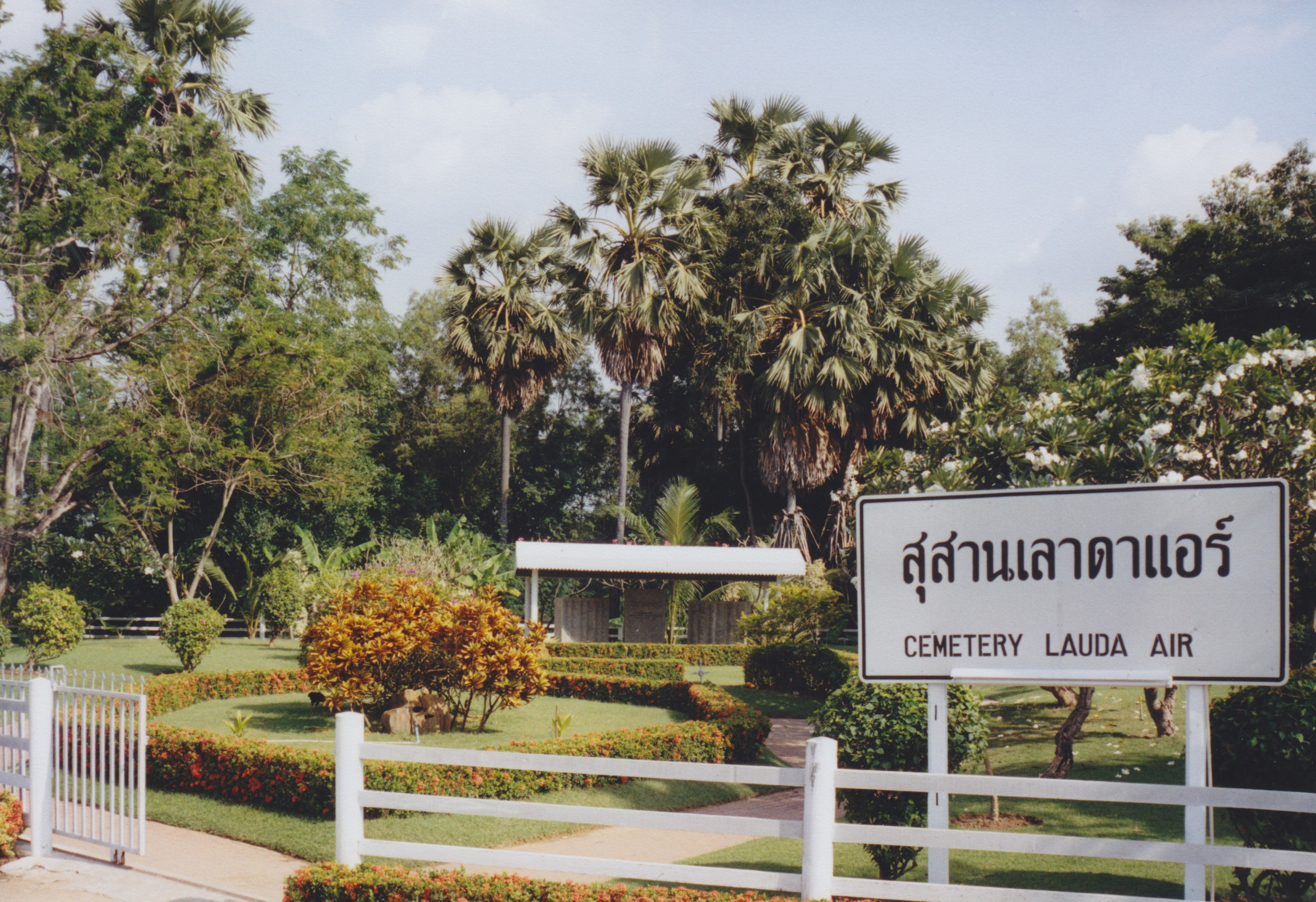
Cemetery Lauda Air near Suphanburi

The airline lost about a quarter of its capacity a result of the crash. Following the crash of OE-LAV, the airline operated no flights to Sydney on 1, 6 and 7 June. Flights resumed with another 767 on 13 June. Niki Lauda said that the crash and the ensuing period constituted the worst time in his life, even worse than the recovery from injuries that he had sustained after a crash in the 1976 German Grand Prix. After the Flight 004 crash, bookings from Hong Kong decreased by 20%, but this was offset by an increase in bookings by passengers based in Vienna.

In early August 1991, Boeing issued an alert to airlines stating that more than 1,600 late-model 737s, 747s, 757s and 767s had thrust-reverser systems similar to that of OE-LAV. Two months later, customers were asked to replace potentially faulty valves in the thrust-reverser systems that could cause reversers to deploy in flight.

At the crash site, which is accessible to national park visitors, a shrine was erected to commemorate the victims. Another memorial and cemetery is located at Wat Sa Kaeo Srisanpetch, about 90 kilometres (56 mi; 49 nmi) away in Mueang Suphan Buri district.

== In popular culture ==
The crash of Flight 004 was featured in an edition of ITV's The Cook Report entitled "Don't Shoot the Pilot" in 1993 and in the second episode of Season 14 of the Canadian documentary television series Mayday, titled "Testing the Limits".

== See also ==
- TAM Airlines Flight 402, another accident caused by an uncommanded reverse thruster deployment. Coincidentally, it is also the deadliest accident involving the aircraft family involved.
- Pacific Western Airlines Flight 314

== Citations ==
- Accident Report — Lauda Air Flight 004 (Archive) — Aircraft Accident Investigation Committee, Ministry of Transport and Communications Thailand, Prepared for World Wide Web usage by Hiroshi Sogame (十亀 洋 Sogame Hiroshi), a member of the Safety Promotion Committee (総合安全推進 Sōgō Anzen Suishin) of All Nippon Airways
- Aircraft, Volume 71. Royal Aeronautical Society Australian Division, 1991.
- Chiles, James R. Inviting Disaster. HarperCollins, 8 July 2008. ISBN 978-0-06-173458-8
- Job, Macarthur. Air Disaster, Volume 2. Aerospace Publications, 1996. ISBN 978-1-875671-19-9
- Parschalk, Norbert and Bernhard Thaler. Südtirol Chronik: das 20. Jahrhundert. Athesia, 1999.
