= Phu Toei National Park =

National park in Dan Chang District, Suphan Buri Province, Thailand

- อุทยานแห่งชาติพุเตย
- IUCN category II (national park)
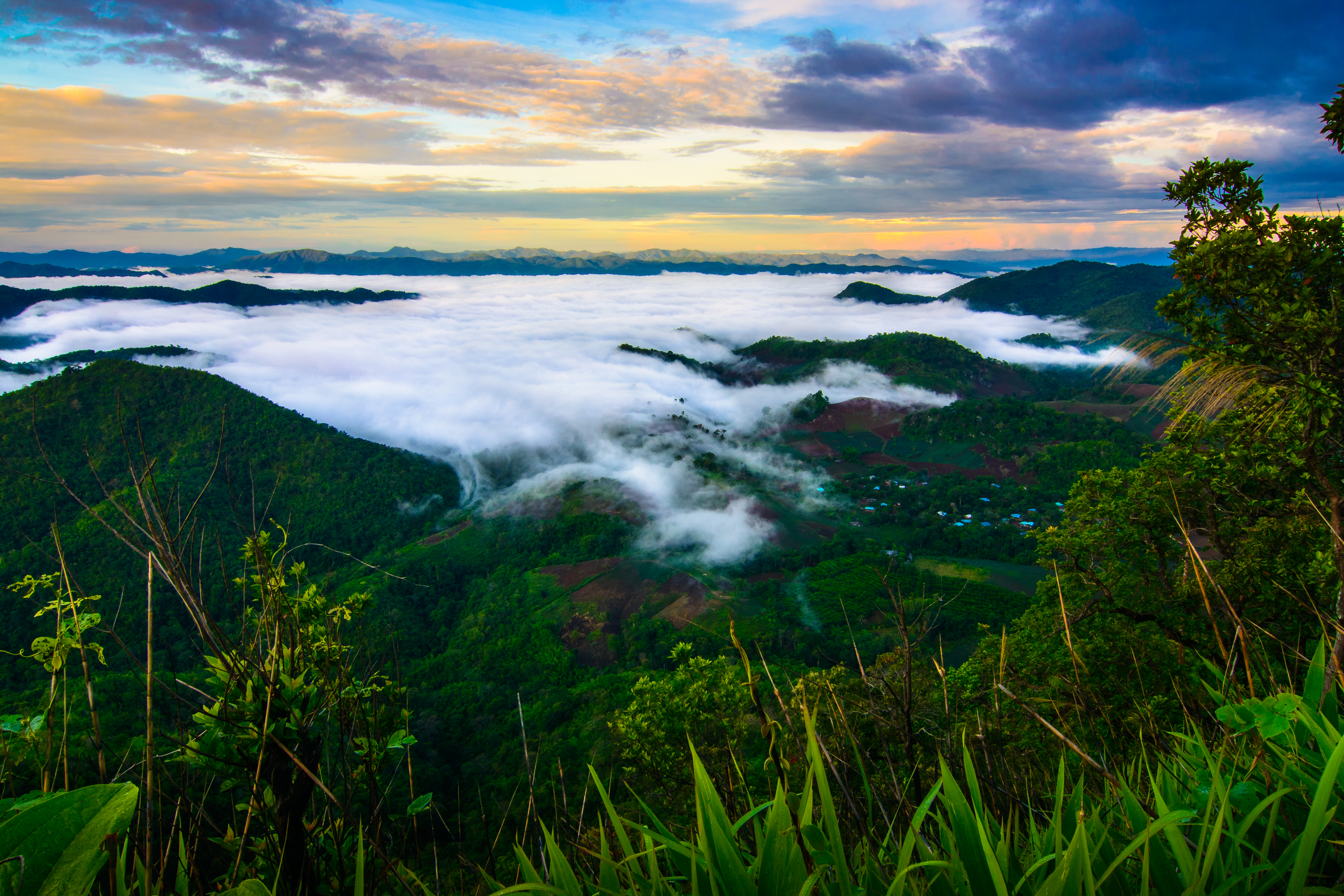

- Location within Thailand
- Location: Dan Chang District, Suphan Buri Province, Thailand
- Coordinates: 14°54′32″N 99°27′36″E
- Area: 317 km^{2} (122 sq mi)
- Established: 1998
- Visitors: 8,830 (in 2019)
- Governing body: Department of National Parks, Wildlife and Plant Conservation

Phu Toei National Park (อุทยานแห่งชาติพุเตย) is a national park, with an area of 198,422 rai ~ 317 square kilometres (122 sq mi) in Dan Chang District of Suphan Buri Province, Thailand. It has been the 86th national park since 30 September 1998.

On 26 May 1991, Lauda Air Flight 004 crashed in the land that later became the park after one of the Boeing 767's thrust reversers deployed in flight.

The park is visited by about 300 people monthly during the high season. The Daily Xpress of Singapore states that the park "goes down as one of Thailand's least known and least visited national parks. So much so, that most Suphan Buri folk don't even realise that their province has a national park."

A dominant feature of the park is Khao Thevada ('Angel Mountain'), a 1,123-metre (3,684 ft) mountain that is the highest in the province. The mountain is on the borders of Kanchanaburi and Uthai Thani Provinces.

== Television episodes ==
- PPTV HD36 discussed Phu Toei National Park on Smile by the Highway, 26 March 2020, in "Conquer the top of the mountain.".

== Location ==
Phu Toei National Park in overview PARO 3 (Ban Pong)

7) Phu Toei National Park in overview PARO 3 (Ban Pong)

	National park
1	Thai Prachan
2	Chaloem Rattanakosin
3	Erawan
4	Khao Laem
5	Khuean Srinagarindra
6	Lam Khlong Ngu
7	Phu Toei
8	Sai Yok
9	Thong Pha Phum

	Wildlife sanctuary
10	Mae Nam Phachi
11	Salak Phra
12	Thung Yai Naresuan West
	Forest park
22	Phra Thaen Dong Rang
23	Phu Muang
24	Tham Khao Noi

	Non-hunting area
13	Bueng Kroengkawia– Nong Nam Sap
14	Bueng Chawak
15	Khao Pratap Chang
16	Phantai Norasing
17	Somdet Phra Srinagarindra
18	Tham Khang Khao– Khao Chong Phran
19	Tham Lawa– Tham Daowadueng
20	Wat Rat Sattha Kayaram
21	Wat Tham Rakhang– Khao Phra Non

== See also ==
- List of mountains in Thailand
- List of national parks of Thailand
- DNP - Phu Toei National Park
- List of Protected Areas Regional Offices of Thailand
