= List of bolides =

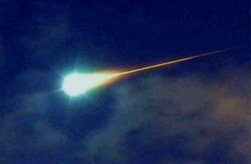
A bolide: a very bright meteor of an apparent magnitude of −14 or brighter.

Fireball over the Bering Sea viewed from space (18 December 2018)

The following is a list of bolides and fireballs seen on Earth in recent times. These are small asteroids (known as meteoroids) that regularly impact the Earth. Although most are so small that they burn up in the atmosphere before reaching the surface, some larger objects may reach the surface as fragments, known as meteorites. A few of these are detected by NASA's Sentry system, in which case the impact is predicted.

Meteors with a recorded absolute magnitude are then converted to an asteroidal absolute magnitude under (M_{a} = M_{m} + 31) and then converted to a diameter assuming that meteoroids brighten by approximate 10 magnitudes when entering the atmosphere. Objects reported only to the American Meteor Society are only listed if observed by at least 100 people, and are cross-referenced with https://fireballs.ndc.nasa.gov if possible, to determine further physical characteristics. The fourth and third to last parameters are calculated from http://convertalot.com/asteroid_impact_calculator.html, assuming a density of 1.5 g/cm^{3}, an impact angle of 45°, and a velocity of 17 km/s (if not provided). The actual values for both may vary by as much as the value itself, so be aware that these values are only estimates.

The bolide on 7 September 2015 is the 2015 Thailand bolide, and the bolide on 26 February 2015 may be related to the 2015 Kerala meteorite.

Number of bolides reported to the AMS
	AMS Bolide listings	JPL bolide listings	ASGARD bolide listings
2006	500	37	0
2007	574	23	0
2008	717	35	0
2009	667	32	0
2010	940	34	0
2011	1,652	30	915
2012	2,171	35	3,140
2013	3,583	24
2014	3,778	33
2015	4,229	43
2016	5,367	32
2017	5,449	29
2018	873	31
2019	710
2020	828
2021	984
2022	1,164
2023	908
2024	987
2025	1,249
2026	847

== List ==
Date/time	Local time	Continent	Country	Location	Altitude (km)	Velocity (km/s)	x Velocity (km/s)	y Velocity (km/s)	z Velocity (km/s)	Energy (Gj)	impact energy (kt)	primary size (m)	impact size (m)	AMS reports	AMS event (if applicable)
2026/05/30	14:06	North America	United States	Cape Cod Bay, Massachusetts	~50	18.8					0.23	1.5		86	3867-2026
2024/10/22 12:27:48	21:27:48	Asia	NA	Coast of Japan	38.2					45	0.15				
2017/11/11 02:20	21:20	North America	United States	United States/New York	?	?	?	?	?	?	?	?	?	215	4235-2017
2017/10/30 18:39	18:39	Europe	France	France/Auvergne-Rhône-Alpes	?	?	?	?	?	?	?	?	?	173; 6	4047-2017; 4096-2017
2017/10/26 22:05:35	10:05:35	Australia	NA	Fiji/Fiji coast	42.5	?	?	?	?	558	1.4	3.73	35.5	0	
2017/10/23 15:31:23	18:31:23	Asia	Saudi Arabia	Saudi Arabia/Northern Borders	35.4	16.7	-5.7	-10.7	-1.5	24	0.086	1.489	15.37	0	
2017/10/15 04:33:16	13:33:16	Antarctica	NA	Antarctica/Wilkes Land coast	24.1	15.9	9.5	-8.3	9.7	33	0.11	1.67	16.5	0	
2017/10/04 12:07:04	20:07:04	Asia	China	China/Yunnan	37.0	14.6	-8.5	-9.0	7.8	192	0.54	3.00	26.6	2	3554-2017
2017/09/21 19:01	21:01	Europe	Netherlands	Netherlands/North Holland	?	?	?	?	?	?	?	?	?	479; 3; 4; 3	3301-2017; 3321-2017; 3323-2017; 3346-2017
2017/09/17 04:59	00:59	North America	United States	United States/Pennsylvania	?	?	?	?	?	?	?	?	?	207	3210-2017
2017/09/05 05:11:27	22:11:27	North America	Canada	Canada/Alberta	36.0	14.7	12.7	-6.1	-4.2	38	0.13	1.86	18.0	314	3068-2017
2017/08/26 01:12:59	21:12:59	North America	United States	United States/Pennsylvania	52.3	12.9	?	?	?	?	?	0.30	?	921	2925-2017
2017/08/04 21:10	23:10	Europe	France	France/Nouvelle-Aquitaine	?	?	?	?	?	?	?	?	?	289	2563-2017
2017/07/31 22:01:35	14:01:35	North America	Mexico	Mexico/Baja California Sur coast	?	?	?	?	?	58	0.19	1.92	19.5	0	
2017/07/30 04:54	21:54	North America	United States	United States/Washington	?	?	?	?	?	?	?	?	?	888	2449-2017
2017/07/23 06:12:38	01:12:38	South America	Brazil	Brazil/Amazonas	38.0	17.2	-0.4	8.7	-14.8	35	0.12	1.63	17.0	0	
2017/07/13 09:30:36	13:30:36	Asia	NA	Indian Ocean/Gulf of Oman	35.0	13.7	-10.0	-6.5	-6.8	73	0.23	2.36	20.7	0	
2017/06/30 14:26:45	23:26:45	Australia	Australia	Australia/South Australia coast	20.0	15.2	10.9	-9.7	4.2	94	0.29	2.38	22.2	1	2138-2017
2017/06/23 20:21:55	08:21:55	Asia	NA	Sea of Okhotsk	35.1	24.3	17.7	13.1	-10.3	184	0.52	2.11	26.3	0	
2017/06/20 13:41:32	22:41:32	Australia	NA	Antarctic Ocean/Australia	33.0	13.6	8.7	-5.7	8.8	636	1.6	4.11	36.9	0	
2017/05/24 07:03:03	14:03:03	Asia	Indonesia	Sumatra coast	46.0	18.4	-6.5	-16.5	-5.0	90	0.28	1.88	21.9	0	
2017/05/22 17:44:39	06:44:39	Australia	NA	Pacific Ocean/South west	33.0	?	?	?	?	35	0.12	1.49	16.9	0	
2017/05/14 09:30:35	11:30:35	Africa	Mozambique	Mozambique/Maputo	33.0	?	?	?	?	35	0.12	1.49	16.9	1	1660-2017
2017/04/30 21:28:28	01:28:28	Africa	NA	Indian Ocean/West	32.4	21.5	-13.4	-14.2	8.9	150	0.43	1.95	24.9	0	
2017/04/15 02:07	22:07	North America	United States	United States/New York	?	?	?	?	?	?	?	?	?	214	1362-2017
2017/04/13 00:43	20:43	North America	United States	United States/South Carolina	?	?	?	?	?	?	?	?	?	463	1337-2017
2017/04/11 04:00	21:00	North America	United States	United States/California coast	?	?	?	?	?	?	?	?	?	542	1298-2017
2017/03/22 00:40	20:40	North America	United States	United States/Pennsylvania	?	?	?	?	?	?	?	?	?	123	1074-2017
2017/03/17 04:37	21:37	North America	United States	United States/Washington	?	?	?	?	?	?	?	?	?	116	1012-2017
2017/03/11 04:51:21	00:51:21	North America	NA	Atlantic Ocean/North west	28.0	?	?	?	?	1263	2.9	4.32	44.1	0	
2017/03/09 04:16:37	03:16:37	Europe	NA	Atlantic Ocean/North east	23.0	36.5	-15.3	25.8	-15.3	400	1	1.8	32.2	0	
2017/03/08 22:21:59	10:21:59	Australia	NA	Pacific Ocean/South west	37.0	?	?	?	?	72	0.23	1.86	29.1	0	
2017/02/25 01:22:59	03:22:59	Africa	Libya	Libya/Jabal al Gharbi	25.4	12.2	-7.6	-9.3	-7.6	65	0.21	2.25	20.1	0	
2017/02/18 19:48:29	23:48:29	Africa	NA	Indian Ocean/Arabian Sea	38.0	24.2	-6.6	-22.7	-6.6	295	0.79	2.21	29.9	1 (?)	680-2017 (?)
2017/02/07 17:37:21	16:37:21	Africa	NA	Atlantic Ocean/South middle	54.0	?	?	?	?	20	0.073	1.265	14.6	0	
2017/02/06 06:09:59	15:09:59	Asia	NA	Pacific Ocean/Philippines coast	33.5	?	?	?	?	66	0.21	1.80	20.1	0	
2016/12/23 03:29:09	06:29:09	Asia	Saudi Arabia	Saudi Arabia/Eastern Province	42.0	29.7	-22.4	16.4	-22.4	38	0.13	1.06	17.4	0	
2016/12/07 04:51:39	20:51:39	Australia	NA	Pacific Ocean/South middle	?	?	?	?	?	117	0.35	2.13	23.4	0	
2016/11/29 08:05:38	02:05:38	South America	NA	Pacific Ocean/South east	?	?	?	?	?	31	0.11	1.45	16.6	0	
2016/11/24 14:10:34	19:10:34	Asia	NA	Indian Ocean/Middle	30.6	17.4	9.1	-11.2	9.7	138	0.4	2.2	24.6	0	
2016/11/03 17:14:29	16:14:29	Africa	NA	Atlantic Ocean/South Middle	37	?	?	?	?	76	0.24	1.88	20.9	0	
2016/10/01 20:23:45	21:23:45	Africa	Algeria	Algeria/Constantine	27.8	14.2	-10.0	3.9	-9.3	31	0.11	1.64	16.5	2	3710-2016
2016/09/22 04:57:49	16:57:49	Australia	NA	Pacific Ocean/South west	40.0	17.5	-2.5	-3.3	17.0	71	0.22	1.79	20.4	0	
2016/09/14 15:01:51	18:01:51	Africa	NA	Kenya/Indian Ocean	54.0	18.3	3.5	-16.2	7.7	76	0.24	1.79	20.9	0	
2016/08/27 21:45:13	08:45:13	Antarctica	NA	Southern Ocean/New Zealand	42.0	?	?	?	?	142	0.41	2.25	24.5	0	
2016/08/11 05:59:58	09:59:58	Africa	NA	Indian Ocean/South west	34.3	14.9	-0.7	-11.4	9.6	184	0.52	2.86	26.4	0	
2016/07/21 00:48:53	00:48:53	Africa	Ghana	Ghana/Brong Ahafo Region	37.0	?	?	?	?	45	0.15	1.61	18.2	0	
2016/07/05 01:24:26	04:24:26	Africa	NA	Somalia/Indian Ocean	38.2	25.1	-10.3	-2.0	-22.8	153	0.44	1.78	25.1	0	
2016/06/27 10:02:42	10:02:42	Africa	Mauritania	Mauritania/Guidimaka	33.3	29.1	-29.1	1.5	0.7	458	1.2	2.25	32.2	0	
2016/06/05 06:12:55	16:12:55	Australia	Australia	Australia/Queensland	28.7	14.5	6.0	-11.9	5.7	331	0.87	3.21	30.8	0	
2016/06/02 10:56:32	03:56:32	North America	United States	United States/Arizona	?	?	?	?	?	172	0.49	2.39	25.9	420; 2 (?); 1	1882-2016; 1928-2016(?); 2022-2016
2016/05/29 12:14:55	09:14:55	South America	NA	Atlantic Ocean/Middle west	32.0	?	?	?	?	69	0.22	1.83	20.3	0	
2016/05/20 11:59:46	12:59:46	South Africa	NA	South Africa/Pacific Ocean	30.6	20.8	5.4	-9.9	17.5	20	0.073	1.11	14.6	2	1813-2016
2016/05/13 00:34:01	16:34:01	North America	NA	Pacific Ocean/North east	33.0	?	?	?	?	101	0.31	2.05	22.6	0	
2016/04/24 05:39:24	02:39:24	South America	NA	Atlantic Ocean/Middle	50.0	?	?	?	?	146	0.42	2.27	24.8	0	
2016/04/18 11:59:10	11:59:10	Africa	Mauritania	Mauritania/Inchiri	31.5	17.1	-3.5	2.2	-16.6	224	0.62	2.57	27.8	0	
2016/04/12 09:51:40	20:51:40	Asia	NA	Pacific Ocean/North west	?	?	?	?	?	20	0.073	1.27	14.7	0	
2016/04/10 14:57:53	00:57:53	Asia	NA	Pacific Ocean/North west	35.2	15.1	4.7	-12.9	-6.4	655	1.6	3.83	36.9	0	
2016/03/16 23:54:20	23:54:20	Africa	NA	Atlantic Ocean/South middle	42.0	13.3	-7.6	9.1	6.0	32	0.11	1.71	16.5	0	
2016/03/03 01:32:43	04:32:43	Africa	NA	Indian Ocean/South west	31.8	11.7	4.8	-7.1	7.9	58	0.19	2.23	19.5	0	
2016/02/23 03:59:13	08:29:13	Asia	Afghanistan	Afghanistan/Zabul	44.0	17.9	-8.5	-1.6	-15.7	35	0.12	1.44	17.0	0	
2016/02/21 05:58:53	03:58:53	North America	NA	Atlantic Ocean/North middle	32.0	?	?	?	?	369	0.96	2.99	31.7	0	
2016/02/19 08:15:02	07:15:02	Africa	NA	Atlantic Ocean/Middle east	39.4	15.5	-14.9	-0.5	4.1	202	0.56	2.65	26.9	0	
2016/02/06 13:55:09	11:55:09	South America	NA	Atlantic Ocean/South west	31.0	15.57(est)	2.7	14.5	5.0	6853	13	7.5	69	0	
2016/01/21 16:44:54	16:44:54	Africa	NA	Atlantic Ocean/South east	42.5	18.14(est)	-3.8	-17.7	-1.2	46	0.15	1.54	18.2	0	
2015/12/30 13:07:50	02:07:50	North America	NA	Pacific Ocean/Middle north	39.0	?	?	?	?	22	0.079	1.3	15.0	0	
2015/12/21 02:32:48	12:32:48	Asia	NA	Papua New Guinea/Pacific Ocean	42.2	12.13(est)	6.4	-10.0	2.5	83	0.26	2.42	21.7	0	
2015/12/08 00:34:23	10:34:23	Antarctica	Antarctica	Antarctica/Oates land	38.0	?	?	?	?	197	0.55	2.48	26.8	0	
2015/11/13 14:59:27	14:59:27	Asia	NA	Philippines/Cagayan Valley coast	28.0	?	?	?	?	102	0.31	2.05	22.6	0	
2015/11/02 21:34:20	23:34:20	Africa	NA	Indian Ocean/South west	37.0	?	?	?	?	78	0.24	1.88	20.9	0	
2015/10/31 11:34:30	02:34:30	North America	NA	Pacific Ocean/North	71.0	?	?	?	?	97	0.29	2.00	22.2	0	
2015/10/13 12:23:08	09:23:08	South America	Brazil	Brazil/Pará	38.9	12.89(est)	-6.6	3.8	10.4	23	0.082	1.58	15.2	0	
2015/10/11 00:07:46	13:07:46	South America	NA	Atlantic Ocean/South south	?	?	?	?	?	30	0.1	1.4	16	0	
2015/10/10 09:57:51	22:57:51	South America	NA	Atlantic Ocean/South south	51.8	11.83(est)	-1.3	-5.1	10.6	36	0.12	1.9	17.0	0	
2015/10/04 21:02:17	11:02:17	North America	NA	Pacific Ocean/Middle north	36.1	?	?	?	?	44	0.15	1.61	18.2	0	
2015/09/17 21:03:14	03:03:14	Australia	NA	Indian Ocean/Middle	?	?	?	?	?	98	0.3	2.0	23	0	
2015/09/14 23:50:50	22:50:50	Africa	NA	Atlantic Ocean/Africa	?	?	?	?	?	70	0.22	1.83	21.5	0	
2015/09/08 13:46:42	16:46:42	Africa	South Sudan	South Sudan/Lakes	44.4	16.15(est)	-11.5	-11.3	-0.9	20	0.073	1.31	14.6	0	
2015/09/07 01:41:19	08:41:19	Asia	Thailand	Thailand/Kanchanaburi	29.3	20.99(est)	16.8	-12.0	-3.8	1798	3.9	4.1	48	2	2151-2015
2015/09/02 20:10:30	22:10:30	Asia	Turkey	Turkey/Elaziğ	39.8	24.06(est)	10.3	-12.2	-18.0	37	0.13	1.22	17.4	2	2117-2015
2015/07/19 07:06:26	01:06:26	North America	Mexico	Mexico/Yucatán-Quintana Roo border	22.0	17.84(est)	9.4	13.0	7.8	23	0.082	1.27	15.1	2	1570-2015
2015/07/12 22:23:14	10:23:14	Asia	NA	Pacific Ocean/Northwest	41.0	?	?	?	?	22	0.079	1.3	15.0	0	
2015/07/04 01:40:11	09:40:11	Asia	China	China/Gansu	46.3	48.99(est)	0.9	-40.4	-27.7	56	0.18	0.84	19.1	0	
2015/06/14 03:03:06	11:03:06	Asia	Philippines	Philippines/Soccsksargen coast	32.4	31.86(est)	-4.7	-17.8	-26.0	71	0.22	1.2	20.4	0	
2015/06/12 17:03:35	15:03:35	South America	NA	Atlantic Ocean/Middle west	43.5	?	?	?	?	176	0.5	2.4	26	0	
2015/06/10 17:43:03	06:43:03	Australia	NA	Pacific Ocean/Middle west	61.1	?	?	?	?	384	1	3.0	32	0	
2015/06/02 08:44:50	22:44:50	Australia	NA	Pacific Ocean/Middle	?	?	?	?	?	380	0.99	3.02	32.0	0	
2015/05/20 10:20:41	22:20:41	Australia	NA	Pacific Ocean/Middle west	32.4	?	?	?	?	36	0.12	1.49	17.0	1	1191-2015
2015/05/18 17:13:51	02:13:51	Asia	NA	Pacific Ocean/Japan coast	29.0	?	?	?	?	43	0.14	1.57	17.8	0	
2015/05/10 07:45:01	19:45:01	Australia	NA	Pacific Ocean/New Zealand coast	29.6	12.18(est)	11.2	0.9	4.7	143	0.42	2.83	24.7	1	1133-2015
2015/05/07 20:34:34	18:34:34	South America	NA	Atlantic Ocean/Middle west	37.0	17.26(est)	-16.2	-5.8	1.4	52	0.17	1.66	18.8	0	
2015/04/30 10:21:01	19:21:01	Australia	NA	Indian Ocean/South east	26.7	12.93(est)	12.2	-4.2	0.9	105	0.32	2.49	22.8	0	
2015/04/21 01:42:51	22:42:51	North America	NA	Atlantic Ocean/North middle	37.4	21.28(est)	-15.3	12.8	7.4	88	0.27	1.68	21.6	0	
2015/04/08 04:06:31	07:06:31	Africa	NA	Indian Ocean/Madagascar coast	36.3	19.23(est)	8.0	-15.6	-7.9	173	0.49	2.20	25.9	1	883-2015
2015/04/03 01:39:38	15:39:38	Australia	NA	Pacific Ocean/Middle	?	?	?	?	?	42	0.14	1.57	17.8	0	
2015/03/30 21:33:52	21:33:52	Africa	NA	Atlantic Ocean/South east	33.1	13.83(est)	-13.7	-1.7	0.8	64	0.2	2.0	20	0	
2015/03/18 00:04:50	11:04:50	Australia	Solomon Islands	Solomon Islands/Ontong Java Atoll	50.0	?	?	?	?	121	0.36	2.15	23.6	0	
2015/03/11 06:18:59	14:18:59	Asia	Philippines	Philippines/Sulu Sea	35.2	19.91(est)	5.5	-10.5	-16.0	72	0.23	1.67	20.6	0	
2015/03/08 04:26:28	20:26:28	South America	NA	Pacific Ocean/South east	?	?	?	?	?	20	0.073	1.265	14.6	0	
2015/03/04 04:30:05	10:30:05	Asia	NA	Indian Ocean/Middle	39.8	17.97(est)	7.8	-16.0	-2.5	55	0.18	1.65	19.2	0	
2015/02/26 22:06:24	13:06:24	North America	United States	United States/Alaska	33.7	21.09(est)	5.6	-2.3	-20.2	188	0.53	2.12	26.5	0	
2015/02/25 10:53:24	02:53:24	North America	NA	Pacific Ocean/East	42	?	?	?	?	58	0.19	1.74	19.5	0	
2015/02/17 13:19:50	13:19:50	Africa	NA	Atlantic Ocean/South north	39	28.77(est)	-28.2	3.4	4.6	33	0.11	1.02	16.6	0	
2015/01/09 17:31:47	14:31:47	South America	Brazil	Brazil/São Paulo	?	?	?	?	?	22	0.079	1.3	15.0	0	
2015/01/09 10:41:11	12:41:11	Africa	Congo (DRC)	Congo/Orientale	36.0	17.52(est)	-10.7	-7.6	11.6	139	0.41	2.2	24.6	0	
2015/01/07 01:05:59	03:05:59	Europe	Romania	Romania/Vrancea	45.5	35.72(est)	-35.4	1.8	-4.4	136	0.4	1.36	24.3	1; 1	53-2015; 100-2015
2015/01/02 13:39:19	23:09:19	Australia	Australia	Australia/South Australia	38.1	18.10(est)	4.5	-14.4	-10.0	20	0.073	1.21	14.6	0	
2014/12/13 02:53:52	15:53:52	North America	NA	Arctic Ocean/Alaska	30.7	21.72(est)	15.3	-13.3	-7.8	44	0.15	1.37	18.1	0	
2014/12/12 06:48:11	16:48:11	Asia	NA	Pacific Ocean/Japan coast	26.3	12.04(est)	11.5	-2.8	-2.2	33	0.11	1.83	16.5	0	
2014/12/09 21:19:18	04:19:18	Asia	Russia	Russia/Siberian Federal District	26.3	?	?	?	?	78	0.24	1.88	20.9	0	
2014/11/28 11:47:18	23:47:18	Australia	NA	Pacific Ocean/New Zealand coast	26.1	13.38(est)	0.4	-1.4	13.3	700	1.7	4.2	37.6	0	
2014/11/27 12:12:52	07:12:52	South America	NA	Pacific Ocean/Peru coast	38.0	?	?	?	?	55	0.18	1.71	19.1	0	
2014/11/26 23:16:51	11:16:51	Antarctica	NA	Southern Ocean/Ross Sea	23.3	25.26(est)	21.3	2.2	13.4	118	0.35	1.64	23.4	0	
2014/11/26 17:40:16	15:40:16	Antarctica	NA	Southern Ocean/Weddell Sea	37.0	19.91(est)	-7.0	16.1	9.4	105	0.32	1.86	22.8	0	
2014/11/04 20:13:30	04:13:30	Asia	China	China/Inner Mongolia	22.2	16.05(est)	-7.2	-12.1	-7.7	156	0.45	2.41	25.3	0	
2014/10/21 18:55:37	09:55:37	North America	NA	Pacific Ocean/North east	?	?	?	?	?	34	0.12	1.49	17.0	0	
2014/10/17 14:07:36	10:07:36	South America	Brazil	Brazil/Amazonas	39.0	?	?	?	?	72	0.23	1.86	20.7	0	
2014/10/14 10:25:03	18:25:03	Asia	Indonesia	Indonesia/West Sulawesi	27.2	16.88(est)	15.0	-6.9	-3.5	29	0.1	1.4	16.1	0	
2014/10/06 20:02:15	02:02:15	Asia	NA	Indian Ocean/Middle south	?	?	?	?	?	39	0.13	1.53	17.5	0	
2014/09/09 18:55:46	03:55:46	Asia	NA	Pacific Ocean/New Guinea coast	32.5	?	?	?	?	28	0.098	1.396	15.98	0	
2014/09/05 21:37:26	11:37:26	Australia	NA	Pacific Ocean/North	?	?	?	?	?	35	0.12	1.49	17.0	0	
2014/08/29 23:15:39	20:15:39	South America	Brazil	Brazil/Pará	?	?	?	?	?	26	0.092	1.367	15.7	0	
2014/08/28 03:07:45	00:07:45	South America	NA	Atlantic Ocean/Brazil coast	?	?	?	?	?	34	0.12	1.49	17.0	0	
2014/08/23 06:29:41	15:29:41	Antarctica	NA	Southern Ocean/Antarctica coast	22.2	16.2	-2.3	5.7	16.5	3819	7.6	6.15	58.9	0	
2014/07/29 07:38:07	20:38:07	Australia	NA	Pacific Ocean/New Zealand coast	?	?	?	?	?	73	0.23	1.86	20.7	0	
2014/07/29 03:07:43	19:07:43	Australia	NA	Pacific Ocean/South middle	?	?	?	?	?	53	0.17	1.68	18.8	0	
2014/06/28 02:40:07	11:40:07	Asia	NA	Pacific Ocean/Philippine sea	26.3	12.4	12.0	3.5	-10.5	245	0.67	3.27	28.4	0	
2014/06/26 05:54:41	11:54:41	Antarctica	Antarctica	Antarctica/Queen Mary land	28.5	11.24(est)	7.0	2.9	8.3	61	0.2	2.3	19.8	0	
2014/05/29 01:12:36	16:12:36	North America	NA	Pacific Ocean/East	28.7	?	?	?	?	58	0.19	1.74	19.5	0	
2014/05/16 20:06:28	14:06:28	South America	NA	Pacific Ocean/South east	30.8	18.0	2.9	13.4	-12.5	136	0.4	2.15	24.4	0	
2014/05/16 12:42:08	01:27:08	Australia	New Zealand	Pacific Ocean/Pitt Island	44.0	16.46(est)	14.4	4.6	6.5	309	0.82	2.9	30.2	1	1160-2014
2014/05/08 19:42:37	01:42:37	Australia	NA	Indian Ocean/middle	35.4	19.01(est)	-2.0	-16.1	9.9	1050	2.4	3.76	41.7	0	
2014/03/29 13:45:41	21:45:41	Australia	Australia	Australia/Western Australia	30.7	16.3	10.0	-12.7	10.0	39	0.13	1.58	17.4	0	
2014/03/18 11:02:37	04:02:37	North America	NA	Pacific Ocean/East	30.5	?	?	?	?	540	1.3	3.3	34.7	0	
2014/03/03 15:00:21	09:00:21	South America	NA	Pacific Ocean/South east	?	?	?	?	?	94	0.29	2.01	22.1	0	
2014/02/18 12:50:44	09:50:44	South America	Argentina	Argentina/Santa Fe	?	?	?	?	?	26	0.092	1.367	15.7	0	
2014/02/13 06:47:42	23:47:42	North America	NA	Pacific Ocean/East	25.0	?	?	?	?	630	1.5	3.5	36.2	0	
2014/01/15 02:46:19	12:46:19	Australia	Australia	Australia/Queensland	29.6	?	?	?	?	140	0.41	2.25	24.5	0	
2014/01/12 16:00:48	21:00:48	Asia	NA	Indian Ocean/North west	37.0	16.2	-5.2	-15.1	-5.2	78	0.24	1.94	20.9	1 (?)	135-2014(?)
2014/01/08 17:05:34	03:05:34	Australia	Papua New Guinea	Papua New Guinea/Manus	18.7	44.8	-3.4	-43.5	-3.4	31	0.11	0.76	16.6	0	
2013/12/23 08:30:57	09:30:57	Europe	Spain	Spain/Balearic Islands	34.3	15.1	-1.1	11.4	-1.1	147	0.43	2.47	24.9	0	
2013/12/08 03:10:09	16:10:09	North America	NA	Pacific Ocean/Center	23.5	11.8	2.3	2.5	2.3	64	0.2	2.3	20	0	
2013/11/21 01:50:35	04:50:35	Europe	Ukraine	Crimea coast	59.3	12.4	-5.0	-11.0	-5.0	75	0.23	2.29	20.6	1 (?)	2996-2013(?)
2013/10/12 16:06:45	14:06:45	South America	NA	Atlantic Ocean/south west	22.2	12.8	-8.0	8.4	-8.0	1610	3.5	5.6	47	0	
2013/10/09 17:27:36	?	?	?	?	?	?	?	?	?	60	0.19	1.74	19.5	0	
2013/09/24 15:31:16	02:31:16	Australia	Cook Islands	Cook Islands/Pukapuka	40.7	?	?	?	?	160	0.46	2.34	25.4	0	
2013/08/12 18:08:02	02:08:02	Australia	Australia	Australia/Western Australia	66.6	?	?	?	?	44	0.15	1.63	18.4	0	
2013/07/31 07:00:38	?	?	?	?	?	?	?	?	?	39	0.13	1.53	17.4	0	
2013/07/31 03:50:14	13:20:14	Australia	Australia	Australia/South Australia	29.1	17.8	17.7	-2.3	17.7	69	0.22	1.77	20.3	0	
2013/07/30 02:36:58	08:36:58	Australia	NA	Antarctic Ocean/ French Southern and Antarctic Lands	25.6	18.8	15.9	-8.6	15.9	390	1	2.8	32	0	
2013/07/27 08:30:36	19:30:36	Australia	NA	Federated States of Micronesia/ Kapingamarangi	26.5	22.1	16.0	14.9	16.0	120	0.36	1.81	23.6	0	
2013/07/26 11:32:26	23:32:26	Australia	NA	Pacific Ocean/Center	37.0	?	?	?	?	20	0.073	1.265	14.6	0	
2013/07/18 00:46:37	?	?	?	?	?	?	?	?	?	22	0.079	1.299	15.0	0	
2013/06/13 02:51:14	?	?	?	?	?	?	?	?	?	22	0.079	1.299	15.0	0	
2013/06/01 22:49:48	06:49:48	Antarctica	NA	Antarctica/coast	28.9	?	?	?	?	34	0.12	1.49	16.9	0	
2013/05/14 23:20:21	04:20:21	Asia	NA	Indian Ocean/North	?	?	?	?	?	20	0.073	1.265	14.6	0	
2013/04/30 08:40:38	06:40:38	Europe	NA	Atlantic Ocean/North east	21.2	12.1	1	9	1	5110	10	8.2	64	0	
2013/04/21 06:43:12	03:43:12	South America	Argentina	Argentina/Santiago del Estero	40.7	14.9	5	14	5	1066	2.5	4.5	42	0	
2013/03/12 10:32:59	11:32:59	Africa	South Africa	South Africa/Western Cape coast	26.0	?	?	?	?	29	0.1	1.4	16	1 (?)	593-2013(?)
2013/02/20 13:13:07	10:13:07	South America	Brazil	Brazil/Rio de Janeiro coast	?	13.6	-11	-8	-11	32	0.1	1.63	16.1	0	
2013/02/15 03:20:33	08:20:33	Asia	Russia	Russia/Chelyabinsk	23.3	18.6	12.8	-13.3	12.8	37500	440	21.7	199	1; 1	327-2013; 3645-2013
2013/02/07 13:12:24	03:12:24	Australia	France	French Polynesia	?	?	?	?	?	65	0.21	1.8	20.1	0	
2013/01/25 07:40:18	03:40:18	North America	Canada	Canada/Newfoundland and Labrador-Quebec border	?	?	?	?	?	3400	6.9	5.8	58	0	
2013/01/12 03:04:21	17:04:21	Australia	France	French Polynesia	36.1	?	?	?	?	48	0.16	1.64	18.5		

== Notes ==
- NASA list of fireballs and bolides updated, interactive map from JPL
