= Bong Ti =

Bong Ti บ้องตี้
- Subdistrict
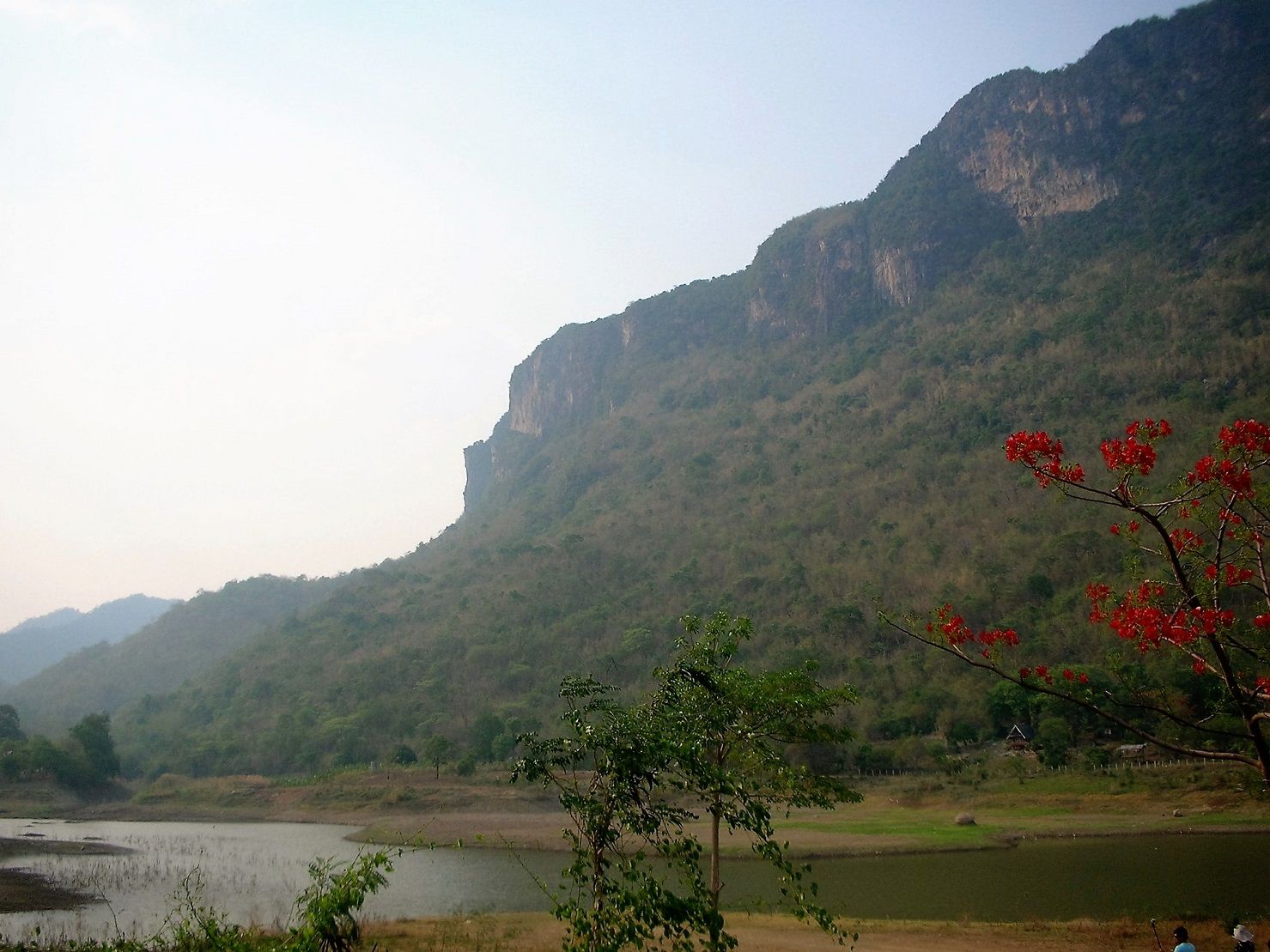
- Mountain range and lake in Tambon Bong Ti, Kanchanaburi Province

- Location within Thailand
- Coordinates: 14°4′N 98°59′E
- Country: Thailand
- Province: Kanchanaburi
- District: Sai Yok
- Elevation: 300 m (980 ft)

Population (2016)
  - Total: 5,820
- Time zone: UTC+07:00 (ICT)

Bong Ti (Thai: บ้องตี้, pronounced [bɔ̂ŋ tîː]) is a village and tambon (subdistrict) of Sai Yok District, in Kanchanaburi Province, Thailand. The tambon contains four villages.

== Geography ==
Bong Ti Subdistrict is in the mountainous area of the Tenasserim Hills, close to the border with Myanmar. There is a tarmac road connecting with Sinbyudaing in Myanmar at the western end of the subdistrict. In 2005 the tambon had a population of 3,894 people. Many of the local inhabitants are Karen people.

In 2015, sound from the meteor was reported in three districts of Kanchanaburi Province: Thong Pha Phum, Sai Yok, and Si Sawat. The Governor of Kanchanaburi Province, Wan-chai Osukhonthip, ordered police and Sai Yok National Park rangers to search Wang Krachae and Bong Ti subdistricts in Sai Yok District for meteor debris.

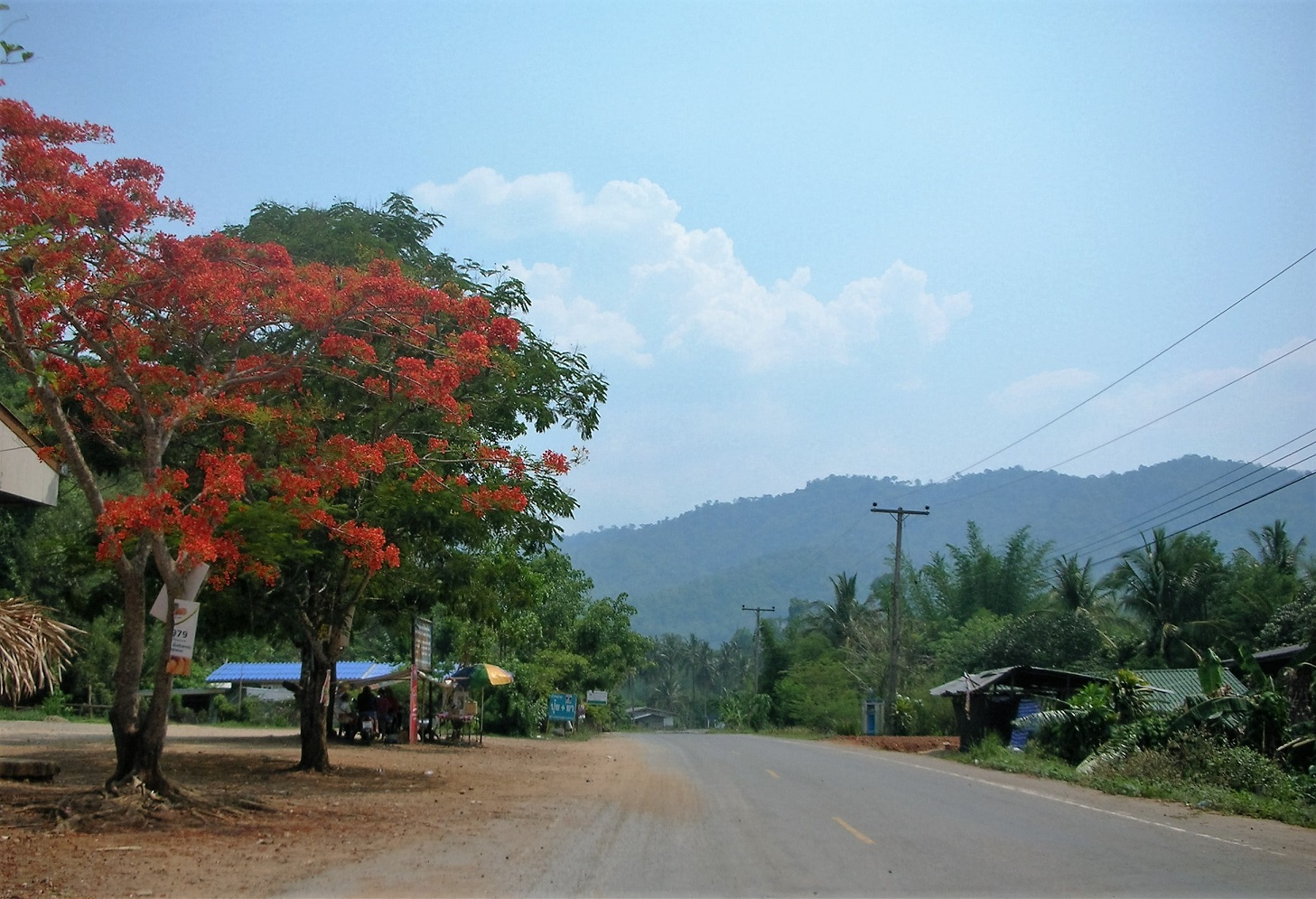
Village, Tambon Bong Ti, Kanchanaburi Province

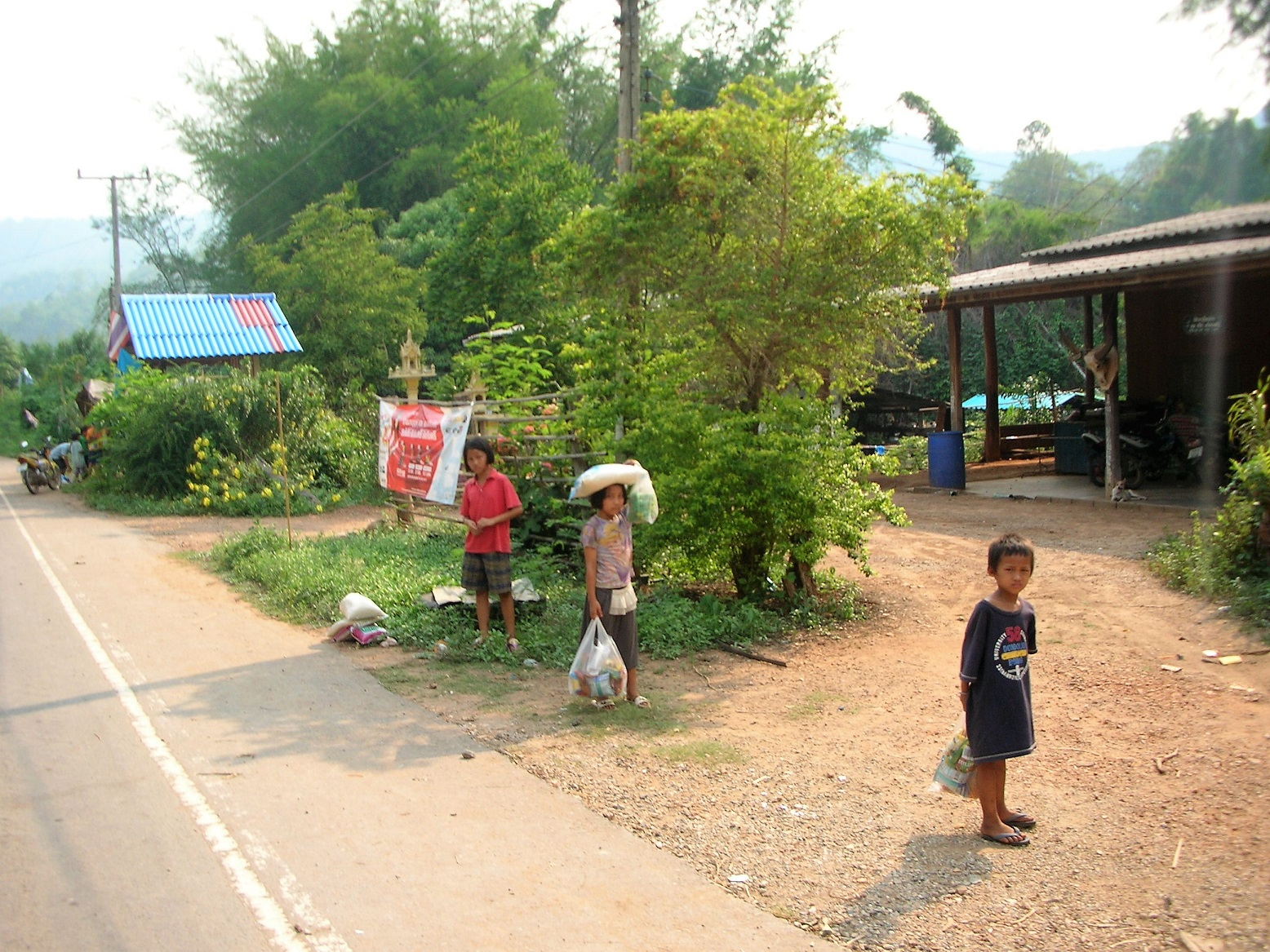
Children in Bong Ti village

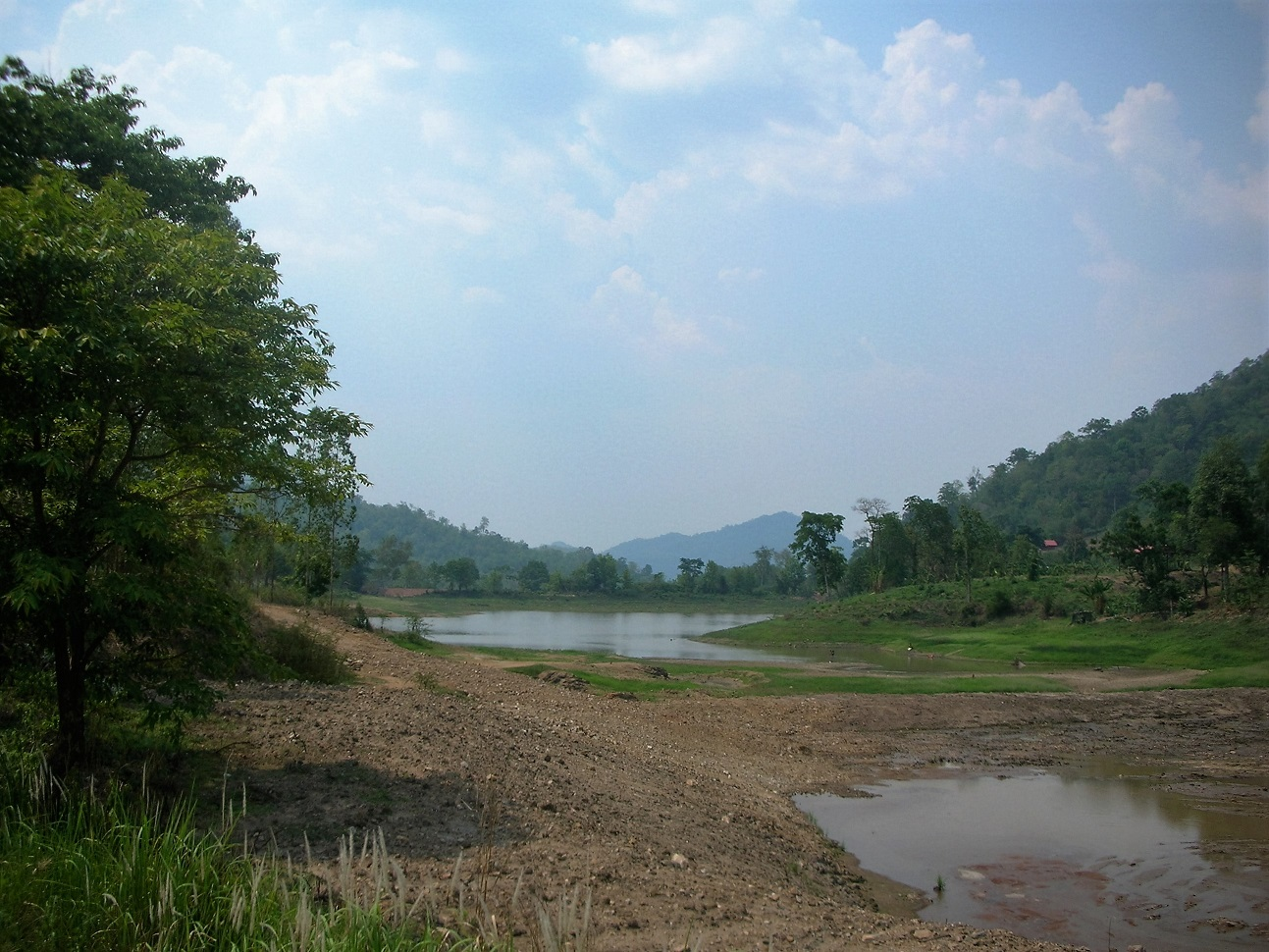
Near the Myanmar border in Tambon Bong Ti

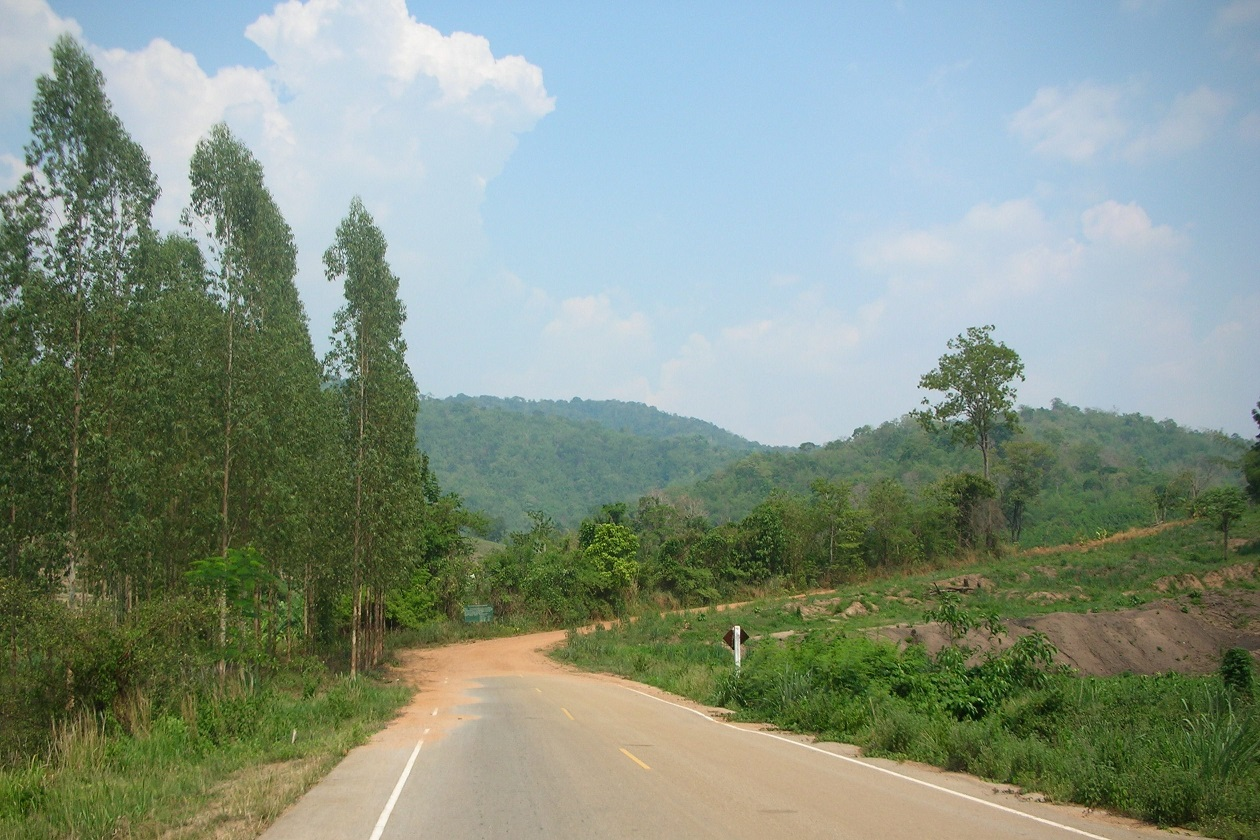
End of the paved road and beginning of the tarmac road leading to Myanmar
