= Sai Yok =

Sai Yok may refer to:

- Sai Yok district, Kanchanaburi Province, Thailand
- Sai Yok National Park
- Sai Yok Noi Waterfall
- Sai Yok Yai waterfall
- Sai Yok rock shelter, an archaeological site
