= 2020 China bolide =

Fireball

- Time: December 23, 2020 07:23:33 local time (December 22, 2020 23:23:33 UTC)
- Location: border of Tibet Autonomous Region/Qinghai province; 31.9°N 96.2°E
- Also known as: Great Chinese Fireball of 2020
- Cause: Impact energy: 9.5 kiloton Radiated energy: 4898 GJ

The 2020 China bolide was observed on December 23, 2020 at 07:23:33 local time (December 22, 2020 at 23:23:33 UTC) when a bright fireball, suspected to be a meteor, was seen flying from north to south and then exploding over mostly Tibetan-inhabited areas of the People's Republic of China.

== Overview ==
The bolide's trajectory was from north to south and had a low inclination (5°±2°) relative to the local surface. According to CNEOS, the approximate location of the airburst was roughly near the border of the Tibet Autonomous Region and the Qinghai province.

According to CNEOS, it was the most energetic fireball, in terms of radiated energy, to happen anywhere over land since the 2013 Chelyabinsk meteor. It was the most energetic fireball to happen anywhere on Earth (sea or land) since December 2018, when a more energetic fireball was observed over the Bering Sea.

Also, it was the largest recorded meteor to fall over China at least in two decades, radiating much more energy than the 2017 China bolide and the 2000 China bolide.

The large fireball lit up the sky about an hour before sunrise, and was caught on video.

The China Earthquake Networks Center posted information about a suspected bolide near the border between Nangqian County and Yushu County (both of which are in the Qinghai province) on their social media account. They said no one was injured.
