= Yok =

ट or YOK may refer to:

- Yok weaving technique, see Tstyle dresses
- Yok, a Turkish copula, negation of "to be"
- YOK or YÖK, an abbreviation for the Commission for Higher Education, Turkey
- yok, the ISO 639-3 code for the Yokuts language spoken by the Yokuts people of California, US
- YOK, the National Rail code for Yoker railway station, Scotland, UK

== See also ==
- Sai Yok (disambiguation)
- Yok-Utian languages
