= Wang Krachae, Kanchanaburi =

Wang Krachae วังกระแจะ
- Subdistrict
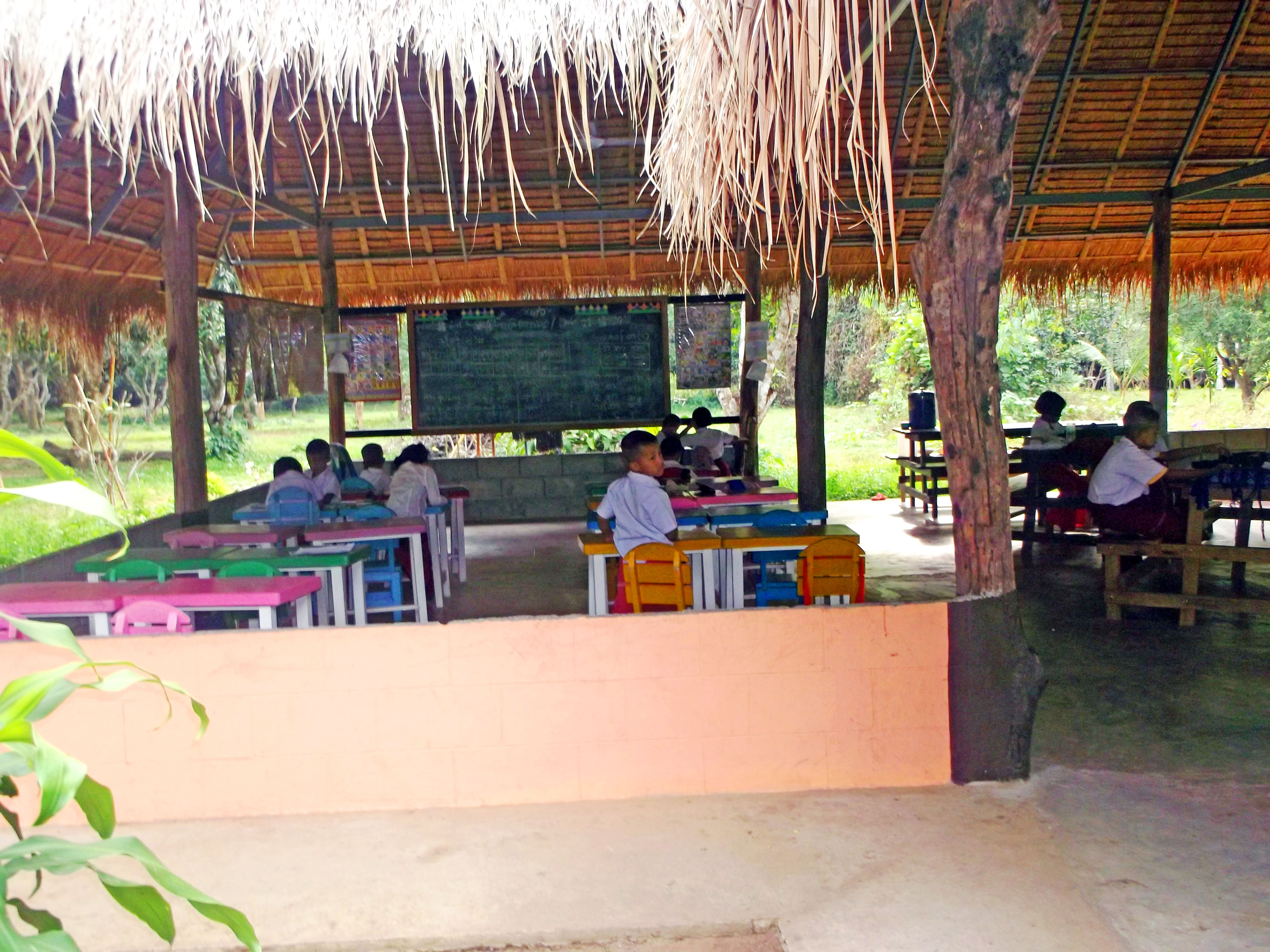
- School in Wang Krachae

- Location within Thailand
- Coordinates: 14°14′N 98°52′E
- Country: Thailand
- Province: Kanchanaburi
- District: Sai Yok
- Elevation: 300 m (980 ft)

Population (2016)
  - Total: 9,134
- Time zone: UTC+7 (ICT)

Wang Krachae (Thai: วังกระแจะ, pronounced [wāŋ krā.t͡ɕɛ̀ʔ]) is a village and tambon (subdistrict) of Sai Yok District, in Kanchanaburi Province, Thailand. In 2016 it had a population of 9,134 people. The tambon contains nine villages.

Wang Krachae Subdistrict is in the mountainous area of the Tenasserim Hills, close to the border with Myanmar.

== History ==
In 2015 sound from the meteor was reported in three districts of Kanchanaburi Province: Thong Pha Phum, Sai Yok and Si Sawat. The Governor of Kanchanaburi Province, Wan-chai Osukhonthip, ordered police and Sai Yok National Park rangers to search Wang Krachae and Bong Ti subdistricts in Sai Yok District for meteor debris.
