= 2015 Thailand bolide =

Meteor

- Date: September 7, 2015
- Time: 08:41 local time (01:41 UTC)
- Location: Kanchanaburi, Thailand; 14.5°N 98.8°E
- Cause: meteor Impact energy: 3.9 kiloton Radiated energy: 1.798 TJ

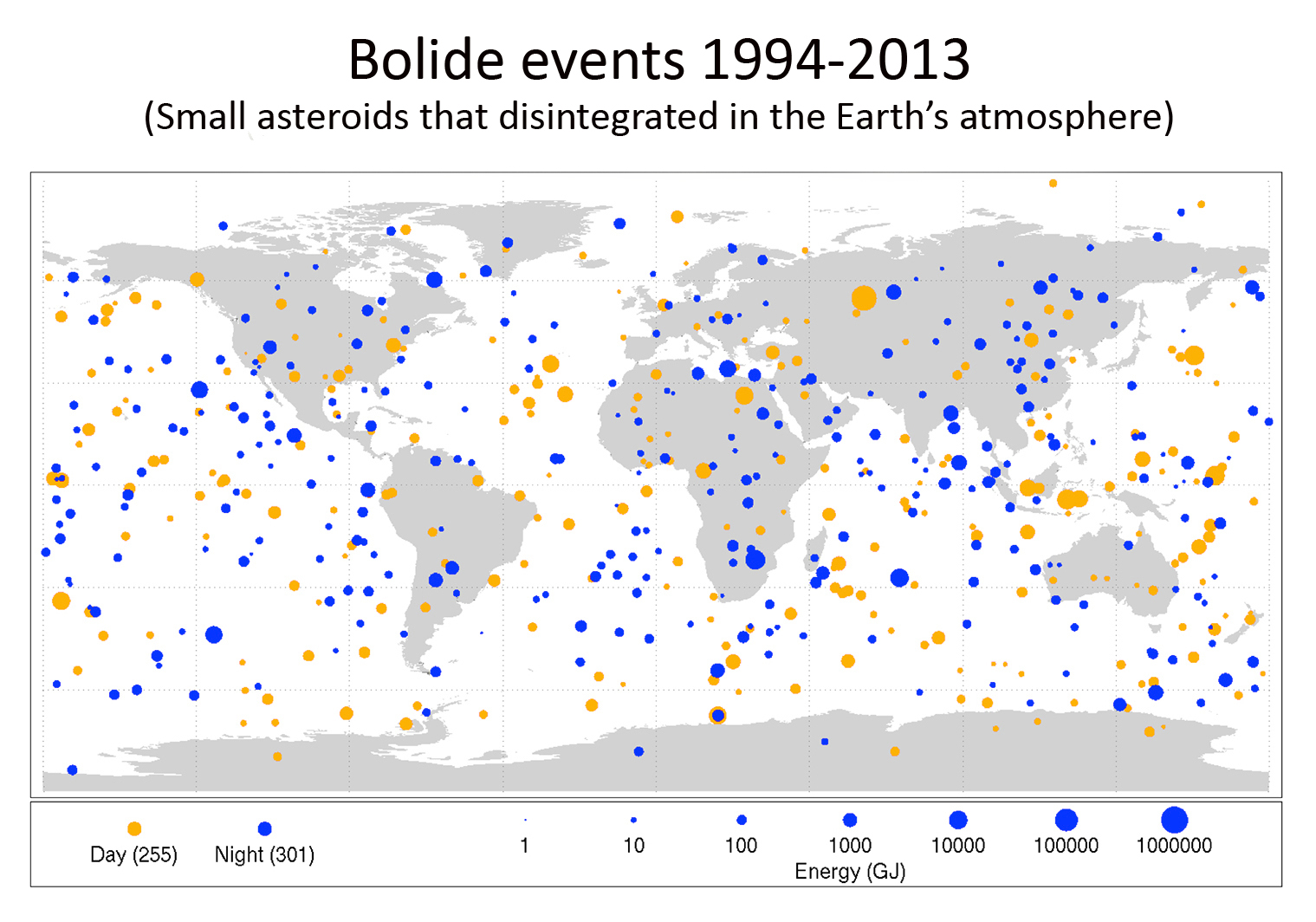
Bolides that disintegrated in the Earth's atmosphere worldwide, 1994–2013

On September 7, 2015, at about 08:40 local time a bolide meteor appeared over Thailand and burned up approximately 100 km (62 mi) above the ground. The meteor briefly flared up producing a green and orange glow before disappearing without a sound of explosion and leaving a white smoke trail. The meteor was recorded by several dashcams during the morning rush hour in Bangkok, and sightings were also reported in Thai towns of Kanchanaburi and Nakhon Ratchasima. The meteor was visible for about four seconds before fading out. As of September 8, 2015 no strewn field has been found. The impact energy was the largest of 2015 at 3.9 kiloton. The last impact this large was on 23 August 2014 over the Southern Ocean.

== Identification ==
The object was initially believed to be FLOCK 1B-11 satellite which was due to burn in the atmosphere about that time or a crashing aircraft. However, because the object travelled in the direction opposite to the east–west axis of artificial satellites, it was identified by the Deputy Director of Thai National Astronomical Research Institute, Saran Poshyachinda, as "an asteroid" (Note: "Asteroid" may have been a mistranslation.) and as a meteor by the president of the Thai Astronomical Society Prapee Viraporn. The object was also identified as a meteor by the Chachoengsao Observatory astronomer Worawit Tanwutthibundit. Tanwutthibundit, who witnessed the event, estimated the object's speed at nearly 50 miles per second before disintegration. A similar explanation was suggested by the former member of Hubble Space Telescope team, Phil Plait, who said that "it was almost certainly a good-sized rock burning up in our atmosphere". According to Plait, the object may have had a steep angle of entry.

Sound from the meteor was reported in three districts of Kanchanaburi Province: Thong Pha Phum, Sai Yok and Si Sawat. Governor of Kanchanaburi Province Wan-chai Osukhonthip ordered police and Sai Yok National Park rangers to search Wang Krachae and Bong Ti subdistricts in Sai Yok District for meteor debris.

The National Astronomical Research Institute of Thailand gave a press release on 14 September, estimating that the meteor was about 3.5 metres in diameter with a mass of 66 tonnes, entering the atmosphere at 21 km/s and having maximum brightness at 29.3 km altitude. The impact energy was equivalent to 3.5 kilotonnes of TNT; its trajectory was 269.8 degrees, with an impact angle of 45.4 degrees. It also estimates that meteorite remnants may have fallen around the area of Sai Yok National Park.

== Other 2015 bolide events in Thailand ==
A previous bolide event was recorded in Thailand on March 2, 2015, and was also seen in Bangkok.

On 2 November 2015, a dramatic green fireball lit up the night sky over Thailand as it streaked past and exploded.
