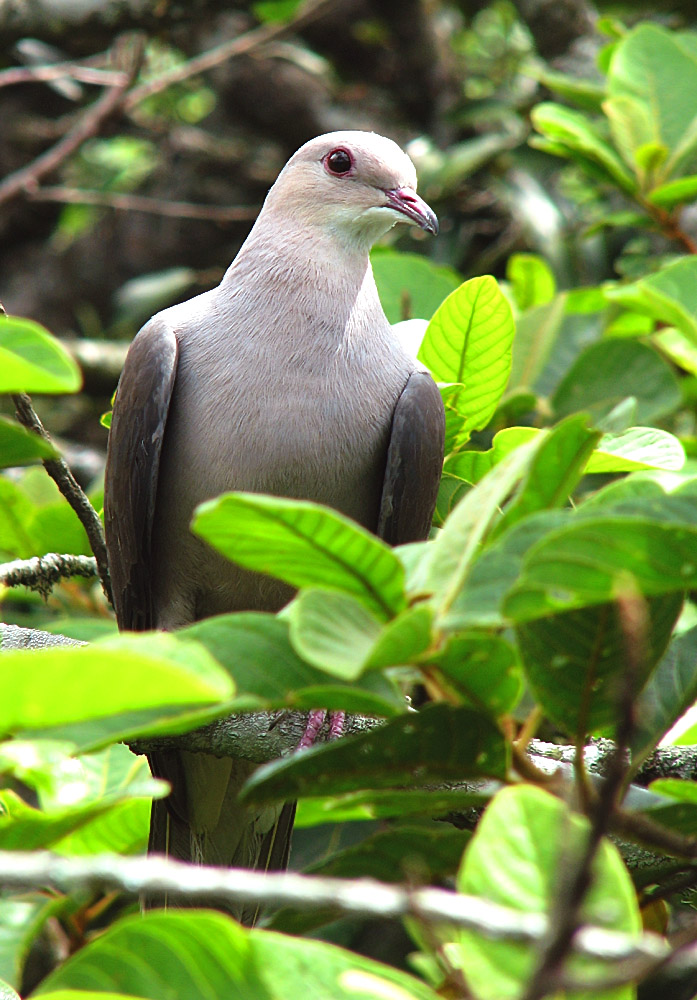
- In Kalakkad Mundanthurai Tiger Reserve, Tamil Nadu, India

Conservation status
- Least Concern (IUCN 3.1)

Scientific classification
- Kingdom: Animalia
- Phylum: Chordata
- Class: Aves
- Order: Columbiformes
- Family: Columbidae
- Genus: Ducula
- Species: D. cuprea

Binomial name
- Ducula cuprea (Jerdon, 1840)

= Malabar imperial pigeon =

Species of bird

The Malabar imperial pigeon or Nilgiri imperial pigeon (Ducula cuprea) is a species of bird in the family Columbidae. It is endemic to the Western Ghats of India.

Its natural habitats are subtropical or tropical moist lowland forests and subtropical or tropical moist montane forests. It previously was considered a subspecies of the mountain imperial pigeon, but was split due to differences in morphology and plumage. This split was later supported by an analysis of its calls.
