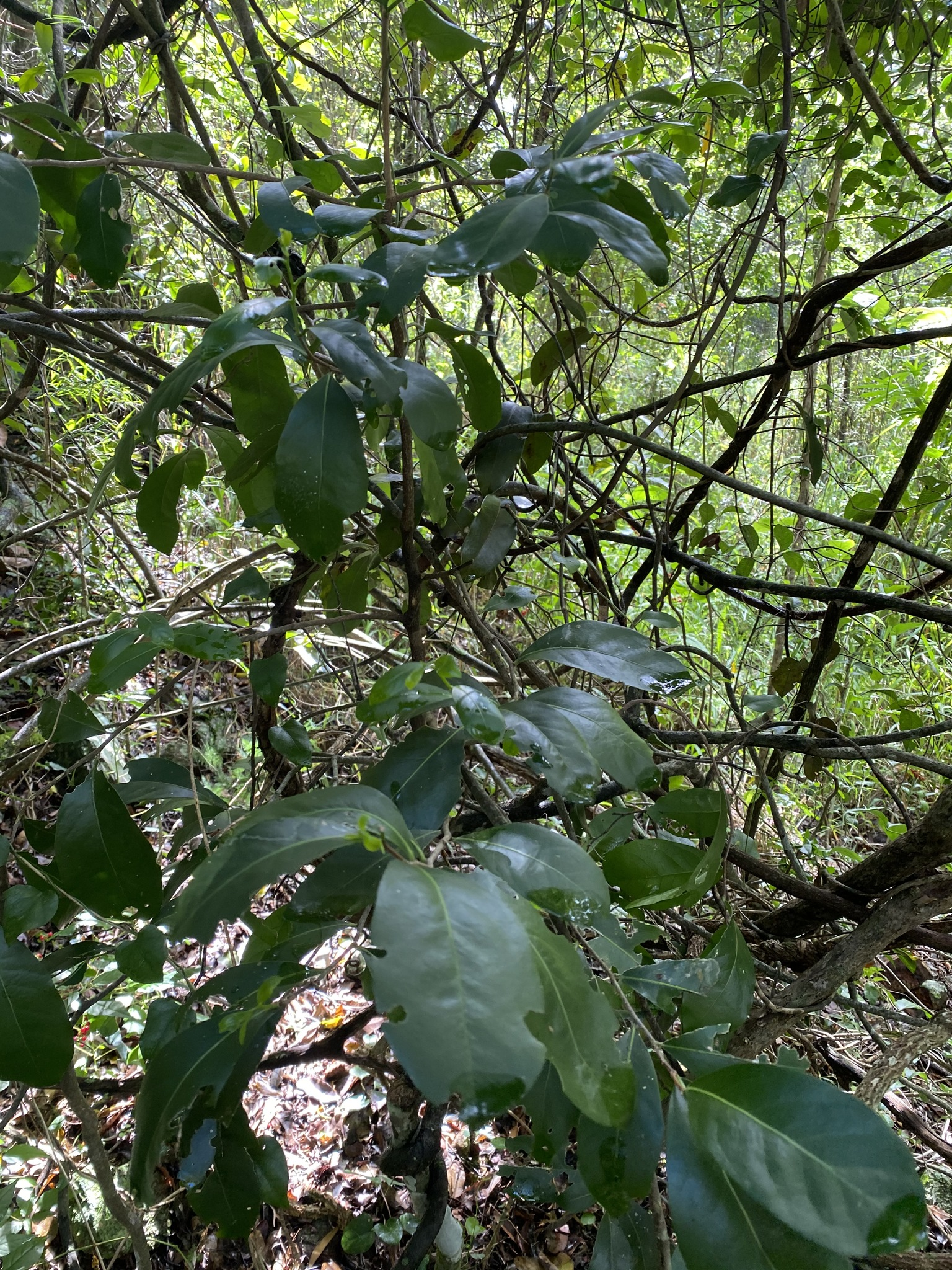

Scientific classification
- Kingdom: Plantae
- Clade: Tracheophytes
- Clade: Angiosperms
- Clade: Eudicots
- Clade: Rosids
- Order: Celastrales
- Family: Celastraceae
- Genus: Siphonodon
- Species: S. australis

Binomial name
- Siphonodon australis Benth.

= Siphonodon australis =

Species of plant

Siphonodon australis, also known as ivorywood or scrub guava, is a species of plant in the bittersweet family. It is native to north-eastern Australia.

== Infrataxa ==
- Siphonodon australis var. australis Benth.
- Siphonodon australis var. keysii F.M.Bailey

== Description ==
The species grows as a tree up to 30 m in height. The leaves are 4.5–12 cm long by 2.5–2.5 cm wide. The small white flowers grow as a 1–3 flowered inflorescence 10–20 mm long. The hard yellow fruits are about 2.5–4 cm long and contain 6–2.5 mm seeds.

== Distribution and habitat ==
The species is found in north-eastern and south-eastern Queensland, extending into north-eastern New South Wales. It occurs in drier rainforest and monsoon forest from sea level to an elevation of 900 m.
