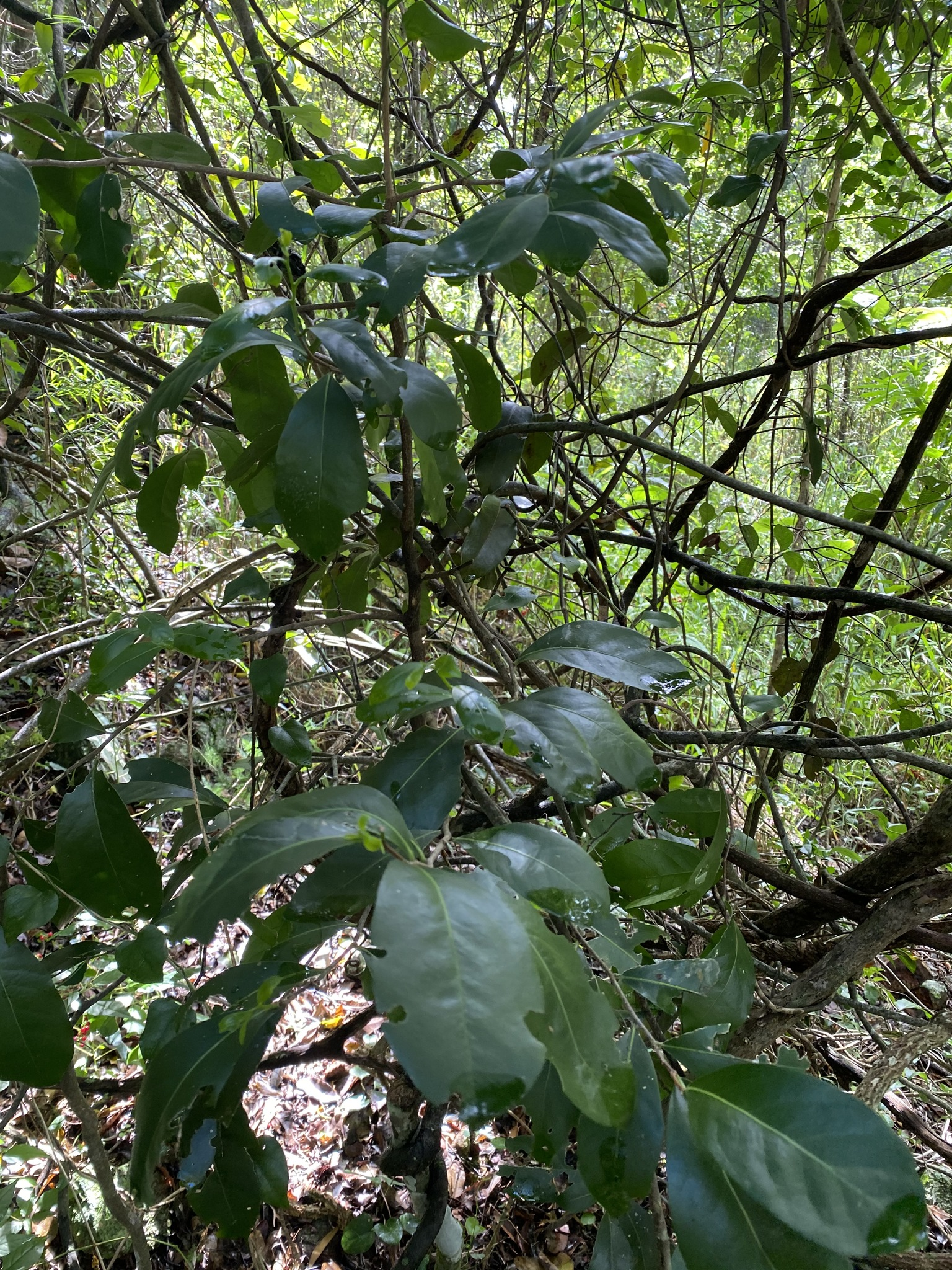
- Siphonodon australis

Scientific classification
- Kingdom: Plantae
- Clade: Tracheophytes
- Clade: Angiosperms
- Clade: Eudicots
- Clade: Rosids
- Order: Celastrales
- Family: Celastraceae
- Genus: Siphonodon; Griff.

Synonyms
- Capusia Lecomte

= Siphonodon =

Genus of flowering plants

Siphonodon is a small genus of flowering plants in the family Celastraceae. It includes six species native to tropical Asia and Australia, ranging from India through Indochina and Malesia to New Guinea and northeastern Australia.

== Species ==
Plants of the World Online accepts six species.

- Siphonodon annamensis (Lecomte) Merr.
- Siphonodon australis Benth.
- Siphonodon celastrineus Griff.
- Siphonodon membranaceus F.M.Bailey
- Siphonodon peltatus Ding Hou
- Siphonodon pendulum F.M.Bailey
