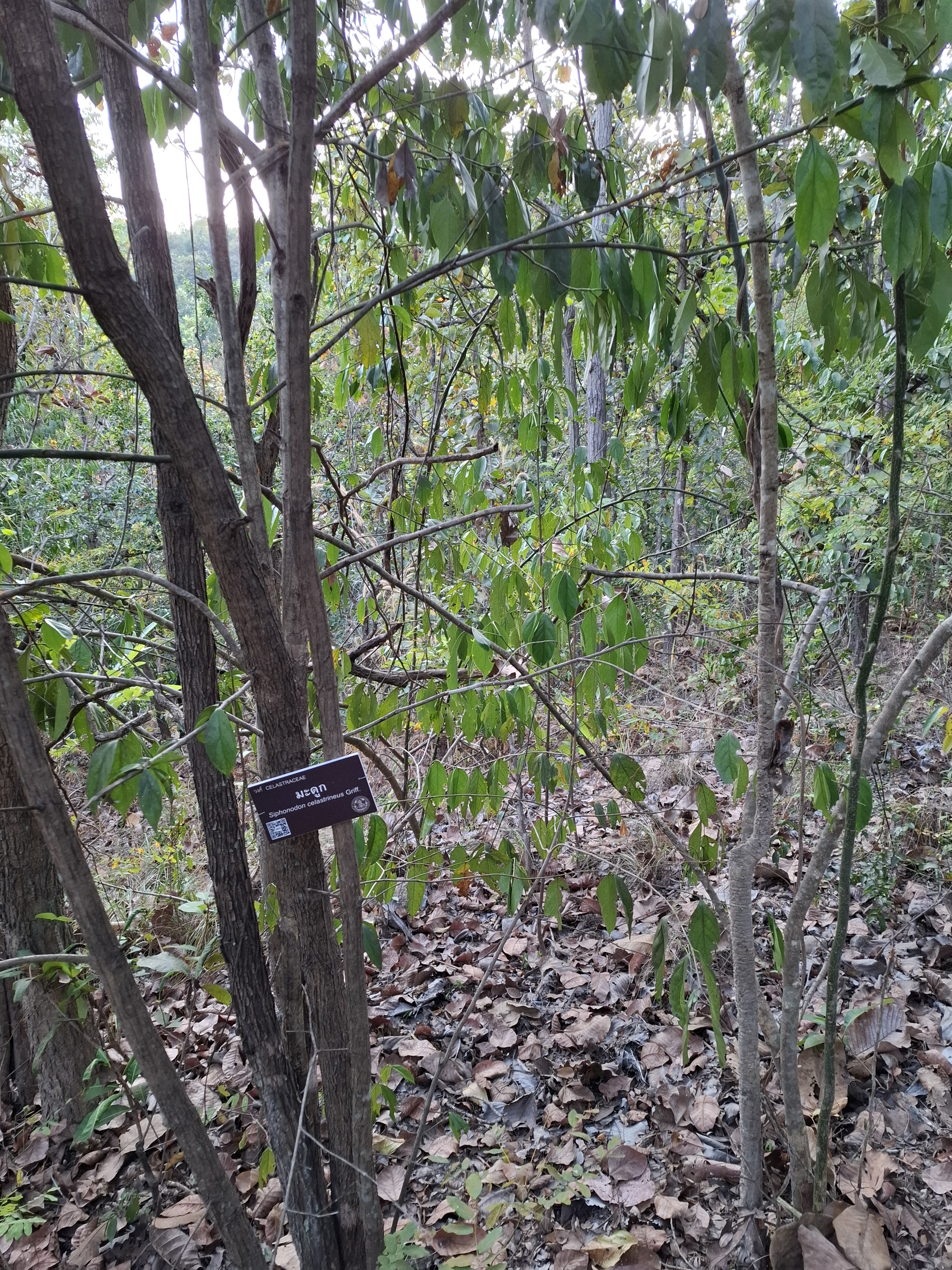
- Siphonodon celastrineus, photographed in Chiang Mai, Thailand

Conservation status
- Least Concern (IUCN 2.3)

Scientific classification
- Kingdom: Plantae
- Clade: Tracheophytes
- Clade: Angiosperms
- Clade: Eudicots
- Clade: Rosids
- Order: Celastrales
- Family: Celastraceae
- Genus: Siphonodon
- Species: S. celastrineus

Binomial name
- Siphonodon celastrineus Griff.

Synonyms
- Hydnocarpus sharmae P.S.N.Rao & Sreek.; Siphonodon celastrineus var. acuminatissimus Merr.; Siphonodon celastrineus var. subglobosus Merr.; Siphonodon pyriformis Merr.; Siphonodon pyriformis var. parvifolius Merr.; Xanthophyllum subglobosum Elmer; Xanthophyllum subglobosum var. longifolium Elmer

= Siphonodon celastrineus =

Species of plant

Siphonodon celastrineus is a species of plant in the family Celastraceae. It is found in Cambodia, India, Myanmar, and Vietnam.
