= 2017 China bolide =

Meteoroid impact in Yunnan, China

- Date: October 4, 2017
- Time: 20:07 local time (12:07 UTC)
- Location: Yunnan, China; 28.1°N 99.4°E
- Cause: meteor Impact energy: 0.54 kiloton Radiated energy: 192 GJ

On October 4, 2017 around 8:07 p.m. local time, an extremely bright meteoroid fell over the northern Yunnan province of China, reaching maximum brightness roughly 37 kilometres (23 miles) above the ground. The 8-second superbolide was widely recorded, as it fell in the late evening on the Mid-Autumn Festival, a fairly popular festival in China.

== Overview ==
Based on its incoming velocity of 14.6 km/s (33,000 mph) and energy, the original asteroid was likely between 2.2 and 3.6 metres (7.2 and 11.8 feet) across, slightly smaller than the 2015 Thailand bolide, which fell about two years previously, several hundred miles to the south.

This is the largest-recorded meteor to fall over China since the 2000 bolide, which radiated about 262 gigajoules (73,000 kWh) of energy compared to the 2017 event's 192 gigajoules (53,000 kWh). While it was only the fifth-most-energetic impact event of 2017, it was the largest one to occur over land, and a populated area no less.
