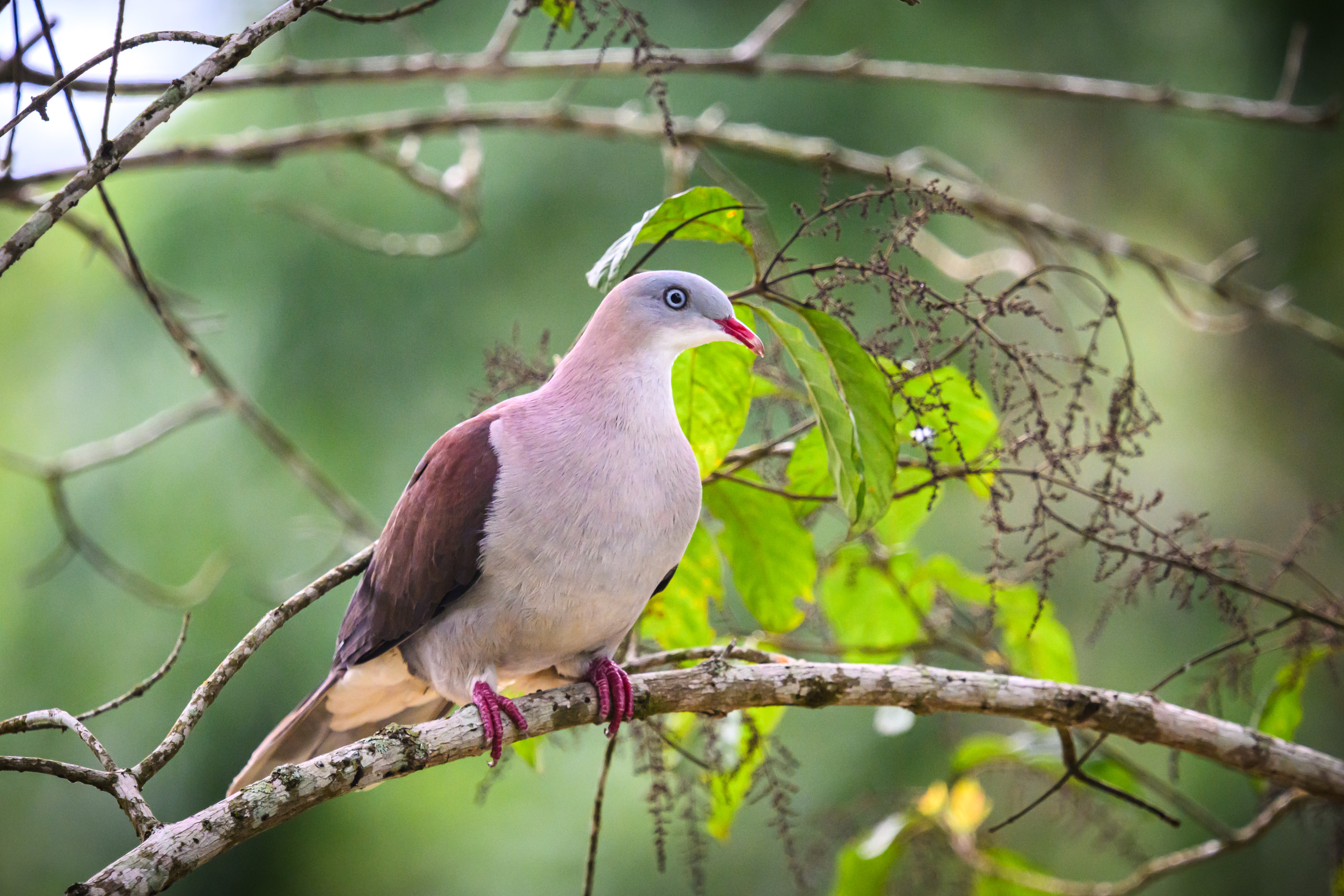
- Ducula badia from Kaeng Krachan National Park, Thailand

Conservation status
- Least Concern (IUCN 3.1)

Scientific classification
- Kingdom: Animalia
- Phylum: Chordata
- Class: Aves
- Order: Columbiformes
- Family: Columbidae
- Genus: Ducula
- Species: D. badia

Binomial name
- Ducula badia (Raffles, 1822)

= Mountain imperial pigeon =

Species of bird

The mountain imperial pigeon (Ducula badia), also known as the maroon-backed imperial pigeon or Hodgson's imperial pigeon, is a species of bird in the pigeon and dove family with a wide range in southeastern Asia.

== Taxonomy ==
The Malabar imperial pigeon (D. cuprea) of India's Western Ghats was formerly considered conspecific, but was split as a distinct species by the IOC in 2021.

== Description ==
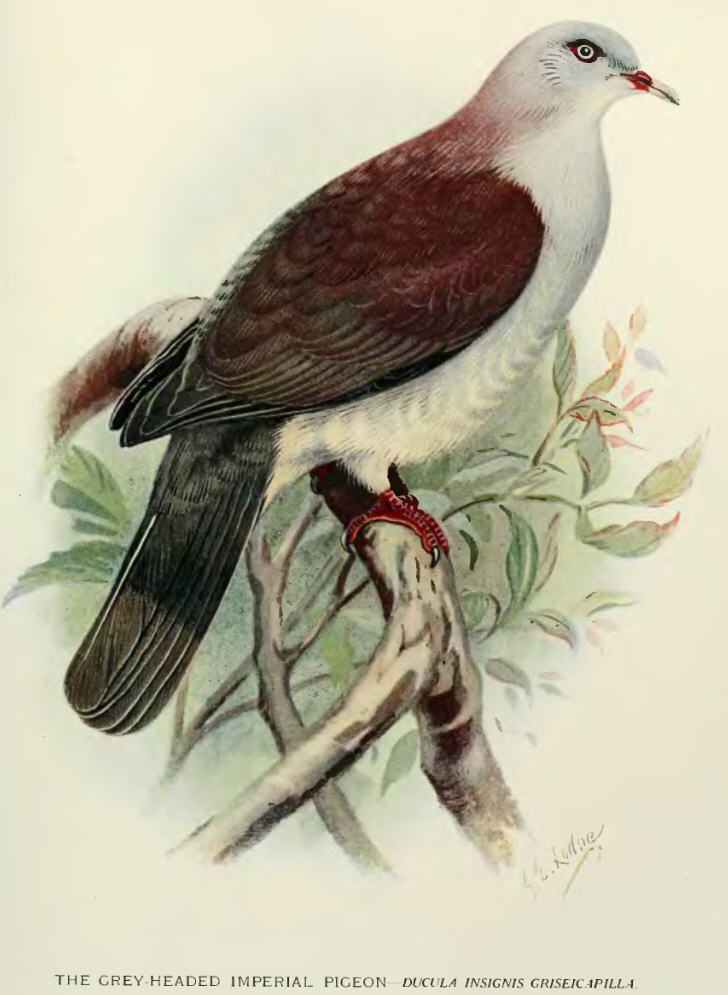
Subspecies insignis

The mountain imperial pigeon is the largest pigeon species in its range at 43–51 cm (17–20 in) long. It has a fairly long tail, broad, rounded wings and slow wing-beats. The head, neck and underparts are vinous-grey with a contrasting white throat and brownish-maroon upperparts and wings, though the upper part of the body can be duller. The underwing is slate-grey and the tail is blackish with a grey horizontal line. The combination the maroon back with the large size give this species a distinctive appearance. Its call consists of a deep, resonant boom that is only detectable at close range.

== Behaviour ==
Though usually solitary, this species has been seen in groups numbering up to 20, especially when going to roost or flying up or down in mountains. They can be difficult to see, since they spend their time usually in high canopy and usually fly fairly high over the canopy.

=== Breeding ===
During the breeding display, calling birds puff up their throats considerably while singing and bow to potential mates. Then the displaying bird engages in a vertical flight up from the perch, up 6 to 8 m (20 to 26 ft) into the air, and then glide back down with wings and tail widely spread. In the Northern stretches of the species range, breeding is from March to August, while in the southern parts of India and southeast Asia, they breed from January to May. The nest is usually in a fairly small tree, about 5 to 8 m (16 to 26 ft) off the ground, and is a flimsy platform. One, or rarely two, eggs are laid and both parents incubate. They only leave the nest if highly pressed.

=== Feeding ===
They feed on fruits and berries, especially figs and nutmeg, which are plucked and swallowed whole. They will occasionally go to the ground to drink, as in Bornean mangroves where up to 200 or 300 of these pigeons have been flushed at once. There may be a partial altitudinal movement in some parts of their range, in pursuit of ideal feeding conditions.

Male Fraser's Hill, Malaysia 1997

== Distribution and habitat ==
The pigeon has a wide range in south-eastern Asia, where it occurs in Bangladesh, Bhutan, Brunei, Cambodia, China, India, Indonesia, Laos, Malaysia, Myanmar, Nepal, Thailand, and Vietnam. Its natural habitats are subtropical or tropical moist lowland forests, subtropical or tropical mangrove forests, and subtropical or tropical moist montane forests. It may be found from sea level to elevations of 2,550 m (8,370 ft) in the Himalayas and 2,200 m (7,200 ft) on Sumatra. Being mainly a foothill bird, it probably only breeds above an elevation of 500 m (1,600 ft), although feeding flocks below this are common. It is usually found in old-growth forests. The species is generally fairly common where extensive stands of forest remain.
