= Sai Yok National Park =

National park of Thailand

- อุทยานแห่งชาติไทรโยค
- IUCN category II (national park)
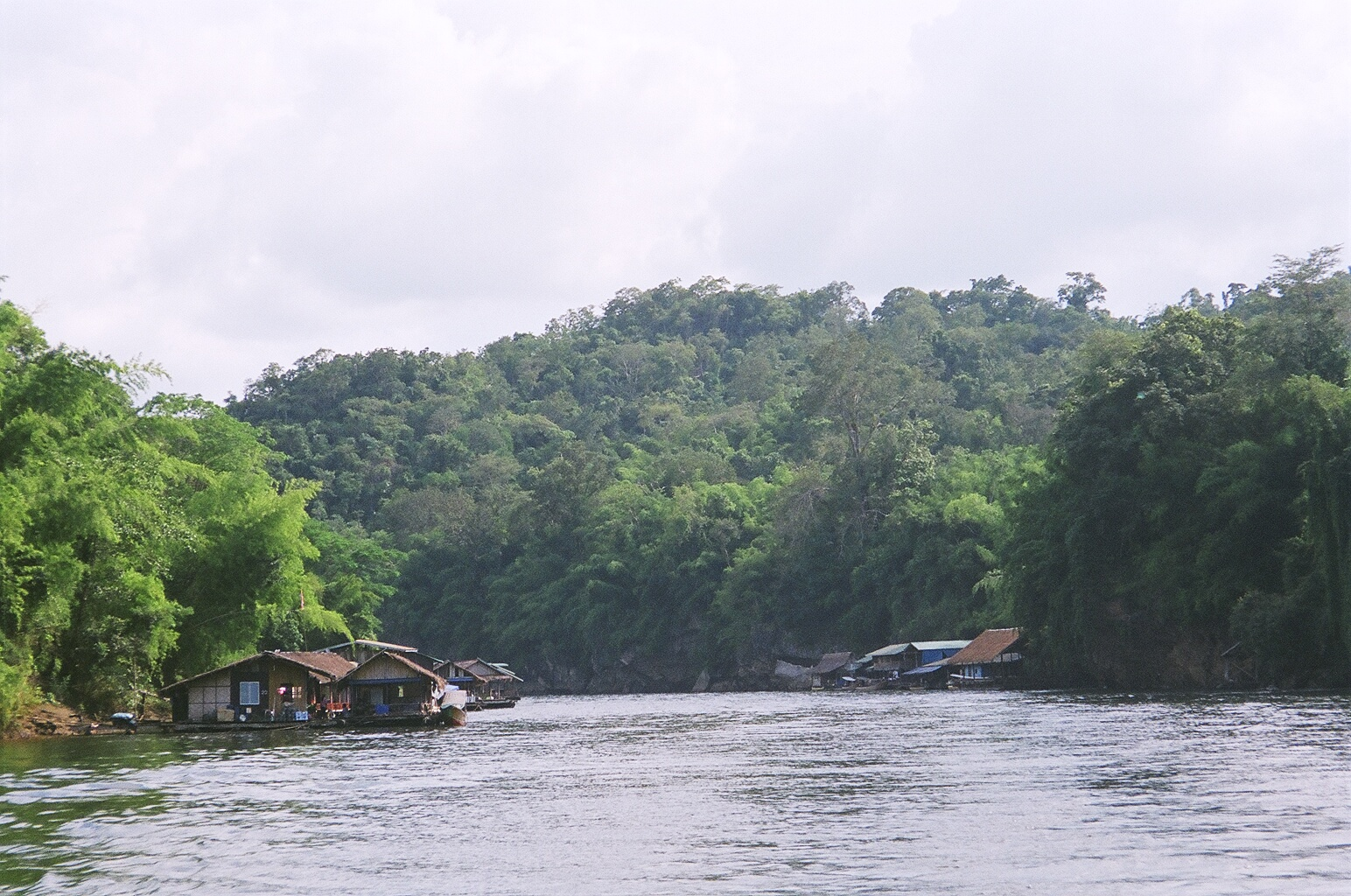
- Khwae Noi river in Sai Yok National Park

- Location within Thailand
- Location: Kanchanaburi province, Thailand
- Nearest city: Kanchanaburi
- Coordinates: 14°23′20″N 98°44′50″E
- Area: 500 km^{2} (190 sq mi)
- Established: 27 October 1980
- Visitors: 67,698 (in 2024)
- Governing body: Department of National Parks, Wildlife and Plant Conservation

Sai Yok National Park (Thai: อุทยานแห่งชาติไทรโยค) is a national park in Sai Yok district, Kanchanaburi Province, Thailand, near the town Nam Tok Sai Yok Noi. The park, home to mountains, waterfalls and caves, is part of the Western Forest Complex protected area. In 1978, the Russian roulette scenes of the film The Deer Hunter were filmed in the park.

== Geography ==
Sai Yok National Park, with steeply limestone mountain in the Tenasserim Range, is 100 kilometres (62 mi) northwest of Kanchanaburi town. The park's area is 312,500 rai ~ 500 square kilometres (190 sq mi) and neighboring (from north clockwise) Thong Pha Phum National Park, Khuean Srinagarindra National Park, Erawan National Park and Tanintharyi Division of Myanmar. The park's highest peak is Khao Ro Rae at 1,132 metres (3,714 ft). The Khwae Noi river ("River Kwai") runs through the park.

== History ==
Within the park are remains of a bridge on the Burma Railway and of a camp used by Japanese troops during World War II. The establishment of the national park was declared the 19th national park in the Royal Gazette on 27 October 1980.

== Climate ==
Average high temperature is 31.1 °C (88.0 °F), average mean temperature is 27.0 °C (80.6 °F), average lowest temperature is 15.4 °C (59.7 °F). Rainy season is from mid-May to October, average rainfall is 975 millimetres (38.4 in)/year. Cold season is from November to mid-February and summer is from April to mid-May. April is the hottest month of the year.

== Flora ==
The main forest type is mixed deciduous forest with 85%, dry evergreen forest with 13% and the least common type is dry dipterocarp forest with 2%.

=== Mixed deciduous forest ===
- Bombax anceps
- Canarium subulatum
- Cassia garrettiana
- Croton persimilis
- Dialium cochinchinense
- Fernandoa adenophylla
- Homalium tomentosum
- Lagerstroemia tomentosa
- Lophopetalum duperreanum
- Pterocarpus macrocarpus
- Schleichera oleosa
- Siphonodon celastrineus
- Terminalia triptera

=== Dry evergreen forest ===
- Anisoptera spp.
- Aporosa villosa
- Castanopsis
- Dillenia aurea
- Dipterocarpus alatus
- Dipterocarpus turbinatus
- Irvingia malayana
- Lagerstroemia calyculata
- Millettia brandisiana
- Polyalthia viridis
- Schima wallichii
- Syzygium cumini
- Syzygium megacarpum

=== Dry dipterocarp forest ===
- Adina cordifolia
- Artocarpus lacucha
- Bombax valetonii
- Canarium spp.
- Chrozophora tinctoria
- Dillenia indica
- Dipterocarpus obtusifolius
- Dipterocarpus tuberculatus
- Ficus microcarpa
- Flemingia sootepensis
- Lannea coromandelica
- Quercus kerrii

== Fauna ==
=== Mammals ===
The number of sigthings of mammals in the park include the following species:

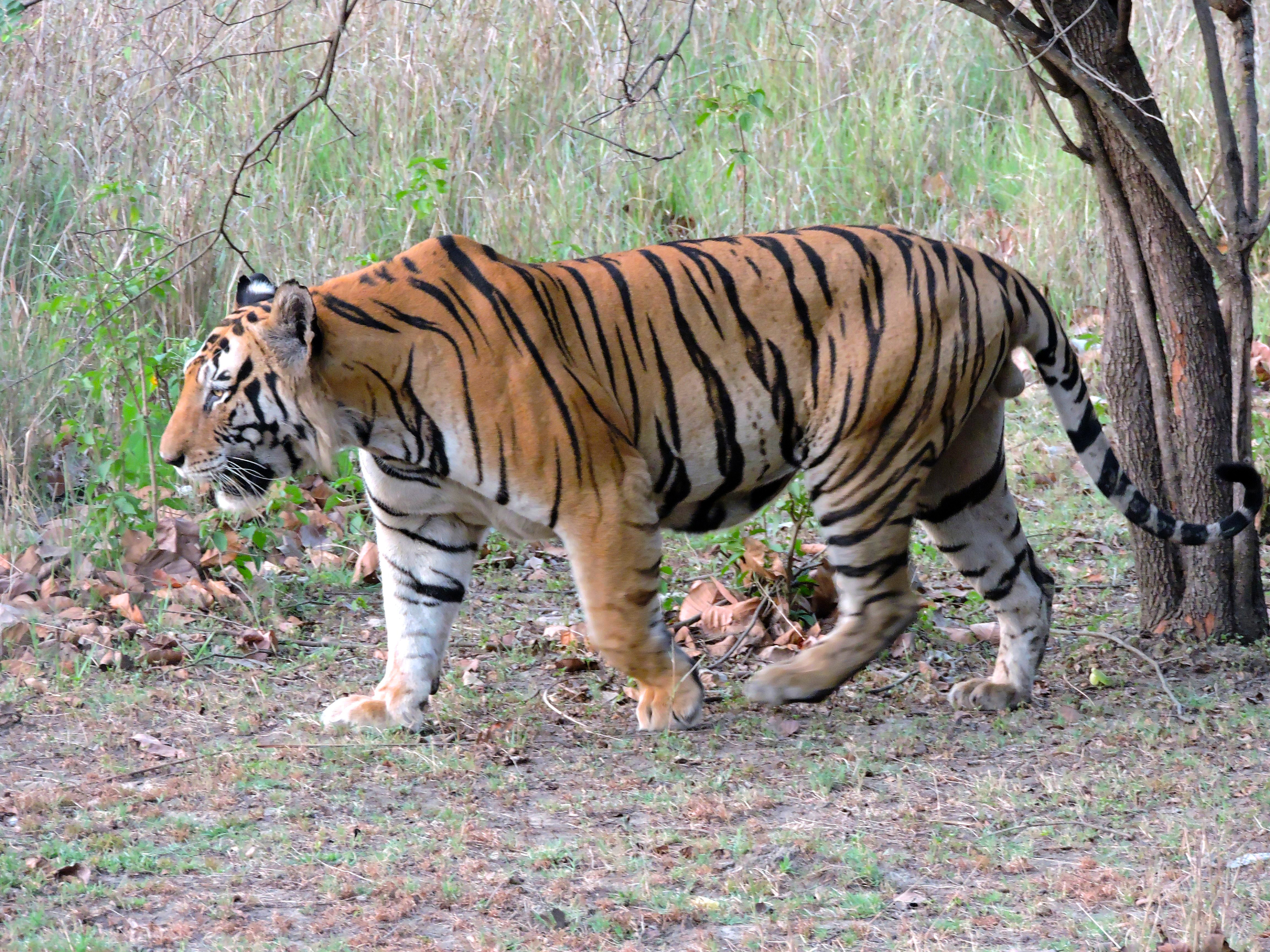
Bengal tiger

- Asian black bear
- Asian elephant
- Asian golden cat
- Banteng
- Bengal tiger
- Bicolored roundleaf bat
- Burmese hare
- Clouded leopard
- Gaur
- Horseshoe bat
- Indochinese leopard
- Kitti's hog-nosed bat
- Lesser mouse-deer
- Mainland serow
- Malayan tapir
- Presbytis
- Sambar deer
- Southern red muntjac
- Sun bear
- Tenasserim muntjac
- Tomb bat
- White-handed gibbon

Sai Yok is home to Kitti's hog-nosed bat, a rare bat species considered to be the world's smallest mammal (weighing around 2 grams). The bat was first spotted in 1973 and is found only in some limestone caves of the park (including Tham Kang Kao) and surrounding areas in Kanchanaburi Province and nearby Myanmar.

=== Birds ===
The park has 209 species of birds from 61 families.

==== Passerine ====
114 species of passerine from 33 families, represented by one species:

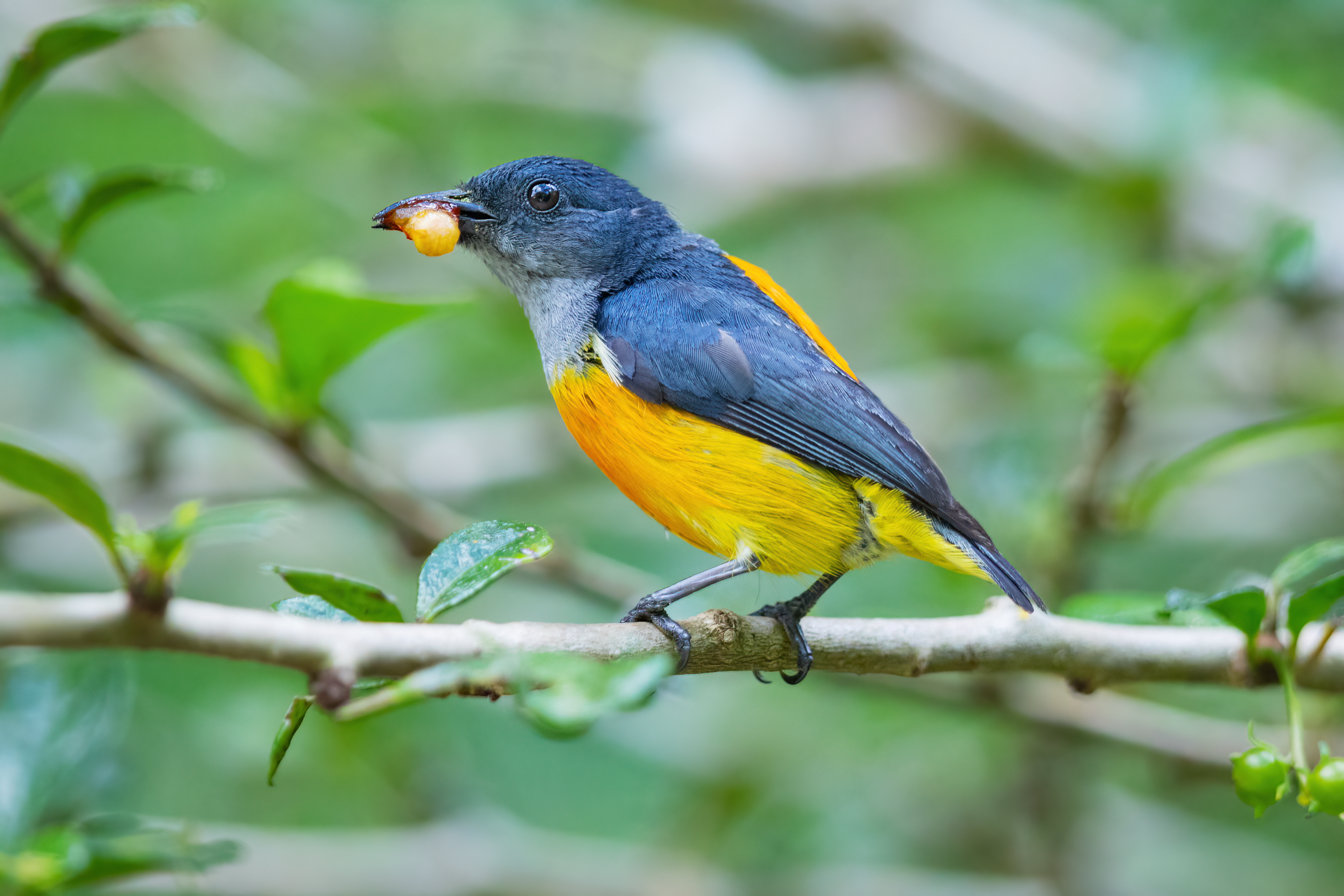
Orange-bellied flowerpecker

- Ashy woodswallow
- Asian fairy-bluebird
- Black-naped monarch
- Blue-winged pitta
- Brown shrike
- Chestnut bunting
- Common green-magpie
- Common hill myna
- Dusky crag-martin
- Eurasian tree sparrow
- Forest wagtail
- Golden-fronted leafbird
- Gray-headed canary-flycatcher
- Great iora
- Hair-crested drongo
- Indochinese cuckooshrike
- Large woodshrike
- Lesser necklaced laughingthrush
- Orange-bellied flowerpecker
- Ornate sunbird
- Pin-striped tit-babbler
- Scaly-breasted munia
- Slender-billed oriole
- Sultan tit
- Sulphur-breasted warbler
- Taiga flycatcher
- Thick-billed warbler
- Variable limestone babbler
- Velvet-fronted nuthatch
- White-throated fantail
- Yellow-bellied warbler
- Yellow-vented bulbul
- Zitting cisticola

==== Non-passerine ====
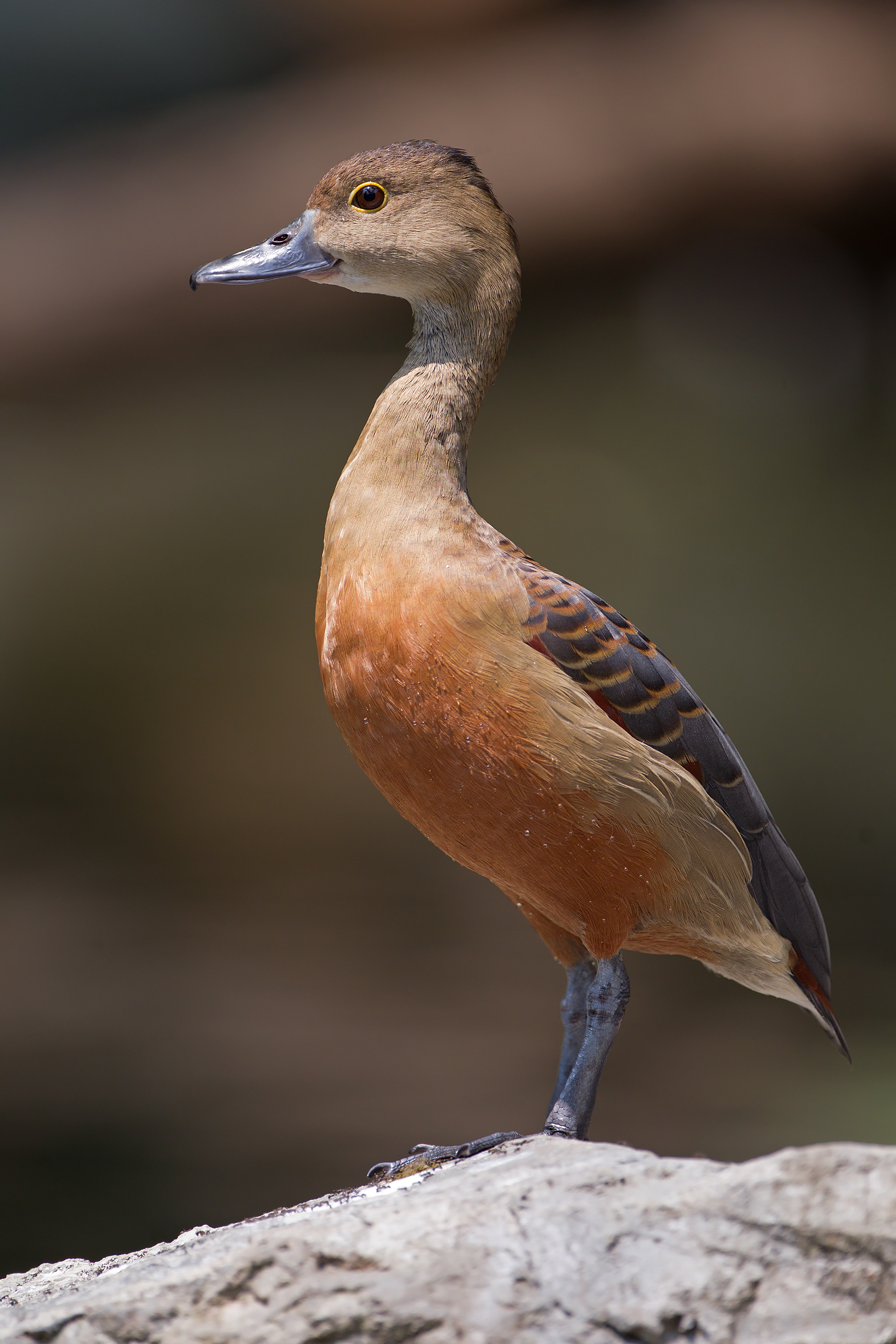
Lesser whistling duck

95 species of non-passerine from 28 families, represented by one species:

- Blue-tailed bee-eater
- Brown boobook
- Chinese pond-heron
- Common sandpiper
- Crested treeswift
- Eastern barn owl
- Eurasian hoopoe
- Eurasian moorhen
- Gray nightjar
- Greater coucal
- Great slaty woodpecker
- Green-eared barbet
- Himalayan swiftlet
- Indochinese roller
- Japanese sparrowhawk
- Lesser whistling-duck
- Little cormorant
- Little grebe
- Mountain imperial-pigeon
- Orange-breasted trogon
- Oriental hobby
- Oriental pied-hornbill
- Osprey
- Red junglefowl
- Red-wattled lapwing
- Stork-billed kingfisher
- Vernal hanging-parrot
- Yellow-legged buttonquail

=== Reptiles ===
The sightings of reptiles in the park include the following species:

- Asian forest tortoise
- Asian narrow-headed softshell turtle
- Big-headed turtle
- Blanford's flying lizard
- Burmese Python
- Elongated tortoise
- Red-tailed Green Ratsnake

=== Amphibians ===
The sightings of amphibians in the park include the following species:

- Asian grass frog
- Banded bullfrog
- Bufo asper
- Bufo macrotis
- Bufo parvus
- Dark-sided chorus frog
- Giant Asian River Frog
- Green paddy frog
- Malayan flying frog
- Puddle frog
- Striped sticky frog

=== Fishes ===
The sightings of fishes in the park include the following species:

- Danio
- Dusky hairfin anchovy
- Hampala barb
- Malayan leaffish
- Oxygaster
- Paralaubuca
- Rasbora
- Soldier river barb

== Attractions ==
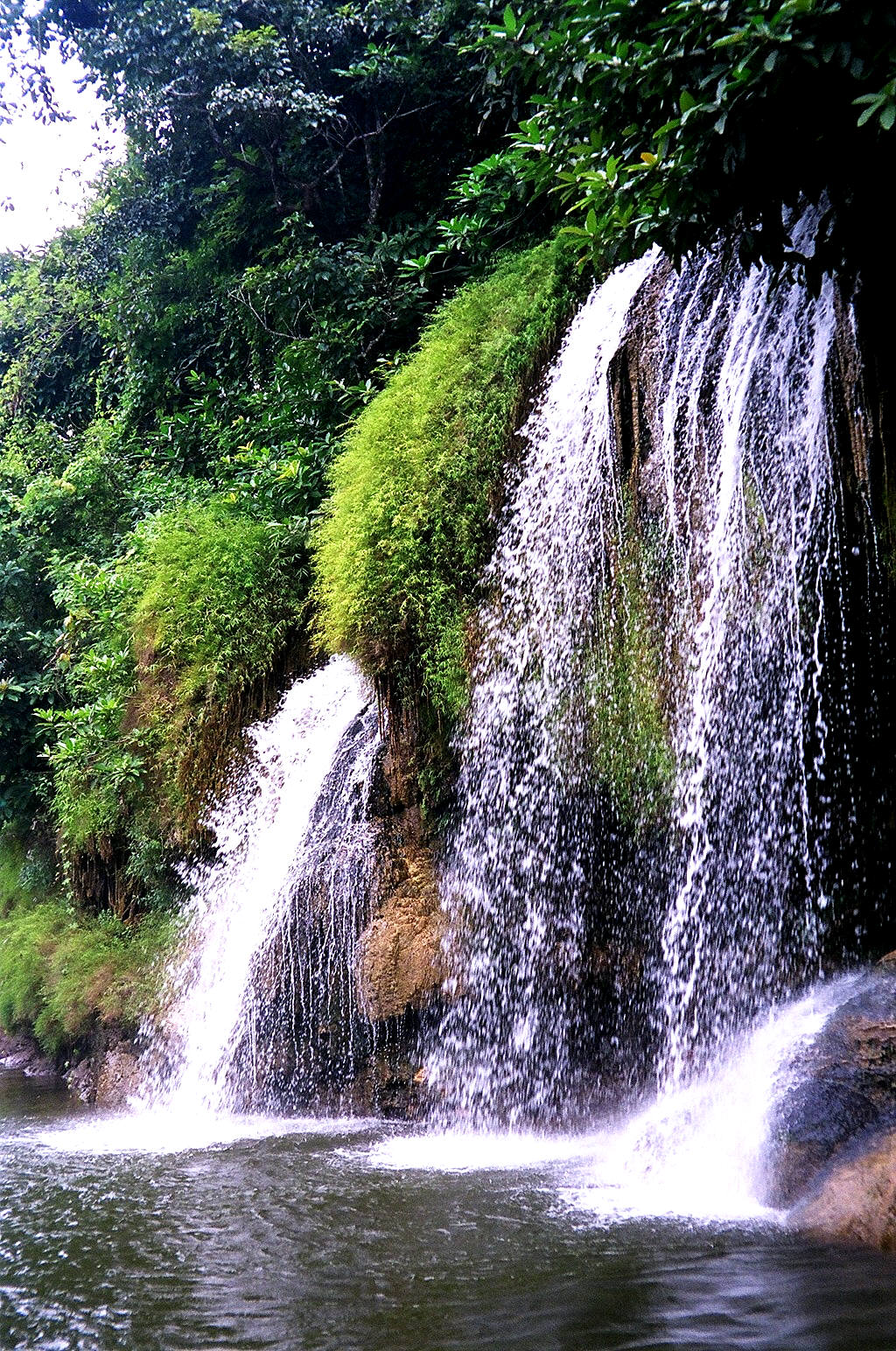
Sai Yok Yai Lek waterfall

The park's major attractions are its waterfalls, including Sai Yok Yai waterfall which flows into the Khwae Noi river. Sai Yok Yai Lek waterfall lies south of Sai Yok Yai along the Khwae Noi. The park also contains numerous caves, the largest of which is Tham Lawa with a length of 500 metres (1,600 ft). This cave complex consists of five large caverns, each containing large stalactites and stalagmites. Another cave system, Tham Dao Wadueng, is 100 metres (330 ft) long and was discovered in 1972 and consists of eight chambers of stalactites and stalagmites.

=== Sai Yok Noi Waterfall ===
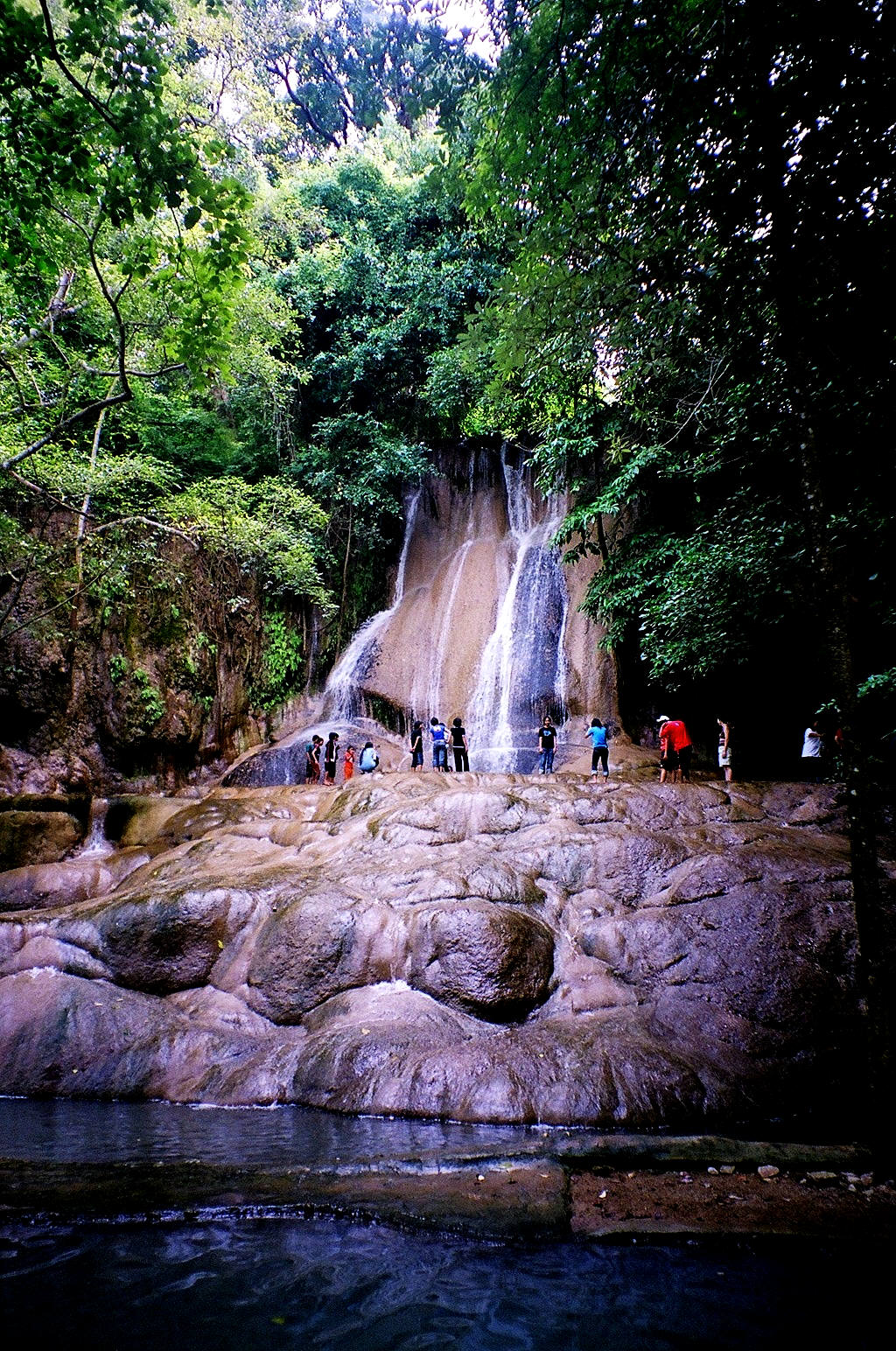
The falls of Sai Yok Noi

Sai Yok Noi, also known as Khao Phang Waterfall, is the most popular attraction of the Sai Yok National Park. The waterfall consists of the limestone cliffs collapsing and that became the origin of the name "Khao Phang Waterfall”. The upstream falls from the mountain and flows along the limestone cliffs about 15-meter high. It is popular among domestic and foreign tourists alike, in part because it lies next to the province's trunk road alongside which there is ample parking space.

The Krasae Cave, a small Buddhist shrine next to a section of rail tracks of the Death Railway and the Dao Wadueng Cave, a secluded collection of stalactites, are located near the waterfall. Hellfire Pass Memorial, a museum and tribute to those lost during the construction of the Death Railway's cuttings and trestle bridges, lies about 35 km to the west of Sai Yok Noi falls. A small market geared toward travelers is also nearby. Sai Yok Yai waterfall, some 40 km to the west lies offset from the valley's main road, adjacent to the Sai Yok National Park Headquarters. It comprises a 10-metre (32 ft) picturesque cascade which drops directly into the Kwae Noi River.

== Location ==
Sai Yok National Park in overview PARO 3 (Ban Pong)

8) Sai Yok National Park in overview PARO 3 (Ban Pong)

| | National park |
| 1 | Thai Prachan |
| 2 | Chaloem Rattanakosin |
| 3 | Erawan |
| 4 | Khao Laem |
| 5 | Khuean Srinagarindra |
| 6 | Lam Khlong Ngu |
| 7 | Phu Toei |
| 8 | Sai Yok |
| 9 | Thong Pha Phum |

| | Wildlife sanctuary |
| 10 | Mae Nam Phachi |
| 11 | Salak Phra |
| 12 | Thung Yai Naresuan West |
| | Forest park |
| 22 | Phra Thaen Dong Rang |
| 23 | Phu Muang |
| 24 | Tham Khao Noi |

| | Non-hunting area |
| 13 | Bueng Kroengkawia– Nong Nam Sap |
| 14 | Bueng Chawak |
| 15 | Khao Pratap Chang |
| 16 | Phantai Norasing |
| 17 | Somdet Phra Srinagarindra |
| 18 | Tham Khang Khao– Khao Chong Phran |
| 19 | Tham Lawa– Tham Daowadueng |
| 20 | Wat Rat Sattha Kayaram |
| 21 | Wat Tham Rakhang– Khao Phra Non |

== See also ==
- IUCN protected area categories
- Western Forest Complex
- List of national parks of Thailand
- DNP - Sai Yok National Park
- PARO 3 (Ban Pong)
