= Sai Yok district =

Sai Yok ไทรโยค
- District
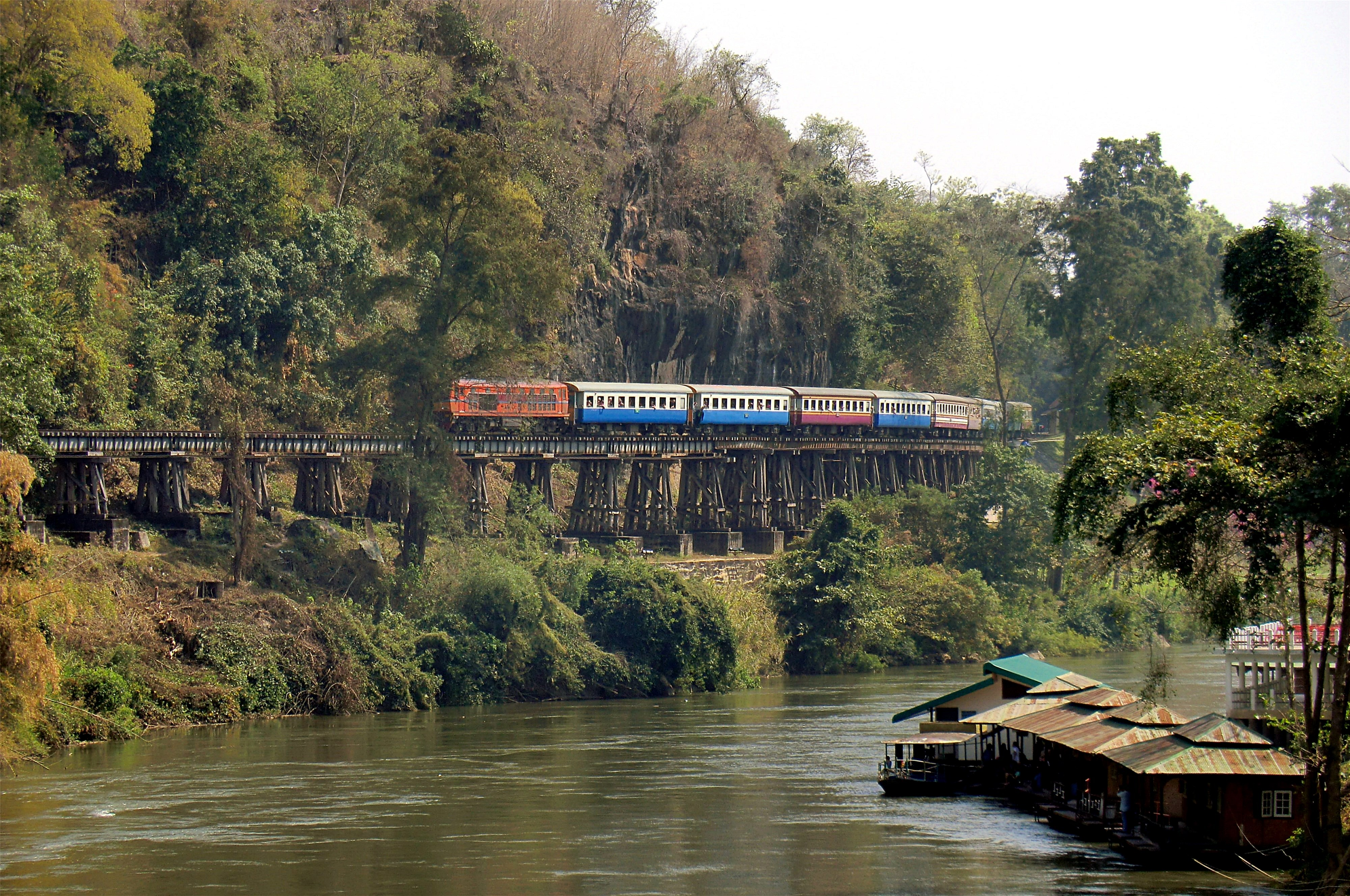
- A train running through the "Hell Rail Pass""

- District location in Kanchanaburi province
- Coordinates: 14°6′56″N 99°8′40″E
- Country: Thailand
- Province: Kanchanaburi
- District: Sai Yok

Area
  - Total: 2,729 km^{2} (1,054 sq mi)

Population (2024)
  - Total: 66,733
  - Density: 24/km^{2} (62/sq mi)
- Time zone: UTC+7 (ICT)
- Postal code: 71150
- Calling code: 034
- ISO 3166 code: TH-7102

Sai Yok (Thai: ไทรโยค, pronounced [sāj jôːk]) is a district (amphoe) in Kanchanaburi province in western Thailand and is located northwest of Bangkok.

== History ==
Prasat Mueang Sing, in tambon Sing, has been identified with Śrī Jayasiṃhapurī, one of the cities named in the Preah Khan inscription of 1191 as receiving an image of the Buddha from Jayavarman VII. David K. Wyatt gives the ground for the reading: taking the list to run in rough geographical order, the place must be the Mueang Sing of Kanchanaburi rather than the Singburi north-west of Ayutthaya. Chris Baker and Pasuk Phongpaichit caution that without corroborating evidence of military or administrative power the sending of the images is better characterised as cultural diplomacy than as rule.

== Geography ==
The district is in the valley of the Khwae Noi River in the Tenasserim Hills area. It borders Myanmar to the south. Along the river the Death Railway runs to Nam Tok Sai Yok Noi.

Sai Yok National Park was created on 27 October 1980 and covers an area of about 500 km^{2}. The most famous sight in the park is the Sai Yok waterfall.

Neighboring districts are (from north clockwise) Thong Pha Phum, Si Sawat, Mueang Kanchanaburi of Kanchanaburi Province and Tanintharyi Division of Myanmar.

== Administration ==
=== Provincial administration ===
Sai Yok is divided into seven subdistricts (tambons), which are further subdivided into 57 administrative villages (mubans).

No.	Subdistrict	Thai	Villages	Pop.
1.	Lum Sum	ลุ่มสุ่ม	11	10,867
2.	Tha Sao	ท่าเสา	11	14,432
3.	Sing	สิงห์	6	5,318
4.	Sai Yok	ไทรโยค	8	11,235
5.	Wang Krachae	วังกระแจะ	9	9,822
6.	Si Mongkhon	ศรีมงคล	8	8,109
7.	Bongti	บ้องตี้	4	6,950
		Total	57	66,733

=== Local government ===
==== Municipalities ====
As of December 2024 there are: three municipal (thesaban) areas in the district: Sai Yok subdistrict municipality (thesaban tambon) consists of the whole subdistrict Sai Yok, Nam Tok Sai Yok Noi subdistrict municipality (น้ำตกไทรโยคน้อย) covers parts of Tha Sao subdistrict and Wang Pho subdistrict municipality (วังโพธิ์) consists of parts of Lum Sum subdistrict.

Subdistrict municipality	Pop.	LAO code	website
Sai Yok	11,235	05710205	saiyok.go.th

Namtok Sai Yok Noi subd.mun.	Pop.	05710201	namtoksaiyoknoi.go.th
Tha Sao	3,914		

Wang Pho subd. municipality	Pop.	05710202	wangphocity.com
Lum Sum	2,120		

==== Subdistrict administrative organizations ====
The non-municipal areas are administered by six subdistrict administrative organizations - SAO (ongkan borihan suan tambon - o bo toh).

Subdistrict adm.org - SAO	Pop.	LAO code	website
Tha Sao SAO	10,518	06710203	thasao-tmk.go.th
Wang Krachae SAO	9,822	06710207	wangkrachae.go.th
Lum Sum SAO	8,747	06710204	loomsoom.go.th
Si Mongkhon SAO	8,109	06710208	srimongkol.go.th
Bongti SAO	6,9502	06710206	bongti.go.th
Sing SAO	5,318	06710209	singsaiyok.go.th

== Education ==
- Mahidol University Kanchanaburi campus
- 44 primary schools
- 3 secondary schools

== Healthcare ==
=== Hospital ===
Sai Yok district is served by two hospitals:

- Sai Yok Hospital with 58 beds.
- Somdet Phra Piya Maharat Rommani Hospital with 30 beds.

=== Health promoting hospitals ===
In the district there are twelve health-promoting hospitals in total, of which;

1 Bongti	1 Lum Bum	1 Si Mongkhon	1 Sing
2 Tha Sao	2 Wang Krachae	4 Sai Yok

== Religion ==
There are sixty-eight Theravada Buddhist temples in the district.

3 Bongti	8 Sing	9 Mongkhon	11 Sai Yok
11 Wang Krachae	13 Lum Sum	13 Tha Sao

Christians have their thirteen churches and muslims have one mosque.

== Popular culture ==
- Sai Yok was the location of shooting the Vietnam scenes of the 1978 film The Deer Hunter.
- Sai Yok was mentioned in the song "Mon Sai Yok" (มนต์ไทรโยค - "Magic Of Sai Yok") by the Thai pop rock band The Innocent from an album Yu Hor (อยู่หอ - Stay Dorm) in 1982. The song is about a delightful time in Sai Yok.

== Sights ==
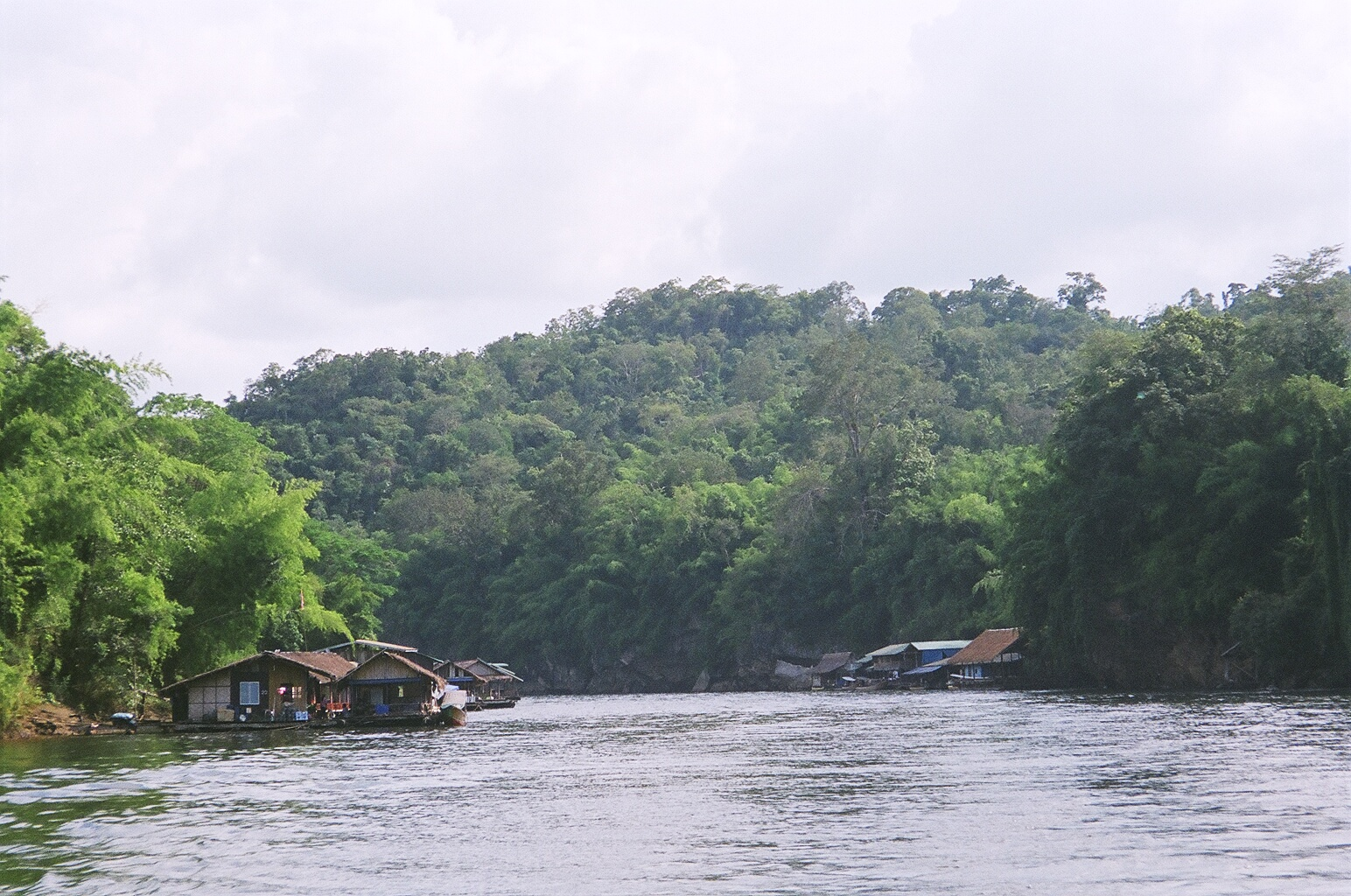
Khwae Noi River, Sai Yok National Park.

Apart from the nature of the Kwae Noi River valley, the other main attraction is Mueang Sing Historical Park, which shows the westernmost Khmer-style temple complex.
