= Erawan National Park =

National park of Thailand

Coordinates: 14°23′N 99°07′E

- อุทยานแห่งชาติเอราวัณ
- IUCN category II (national park)
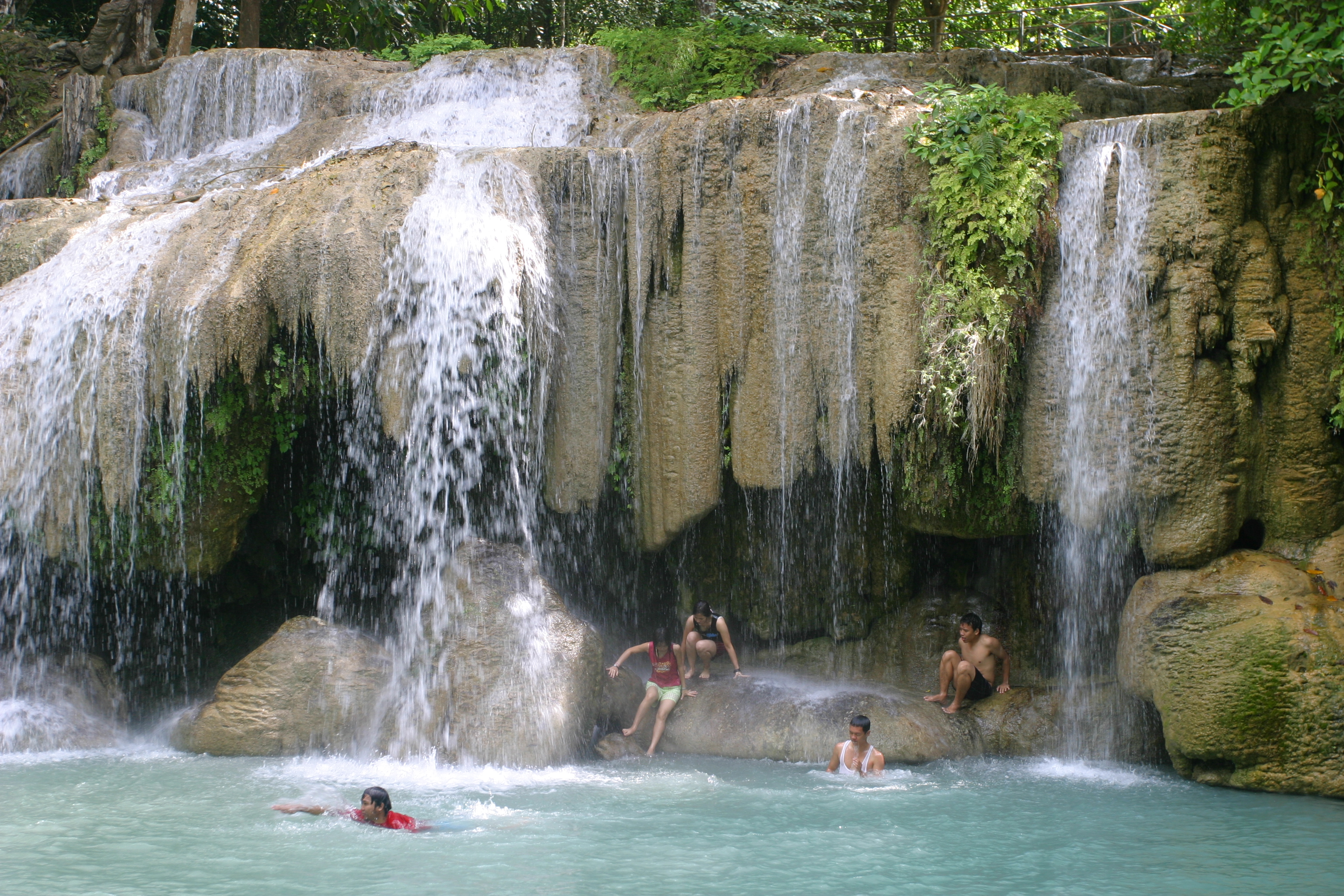
- Erawan Waterfall
- Interactive map of Erawan National Park
- Location: Kanchanaburi province, Thailand
- Nearest city: Kanchanaburi
- Area: 550 km^{2} (210 sq mi)
- Established: 19 June 1975
- Visitors: 519,235 (in 2024)
- Governing body: Department of National Parks, Wildlife and Plant Conservation (DNP)

Erawan National Park (Thai: อุทยานแห่งชาติเอราวัณ) is a protected area in Western Thailand, in the Tenasserim Hills of Kanchanaburi Province. Founded in 1975, it was the 12th national park of Thailand.

== Geography ==
Erawan National Park is located about 50 kilometers (30 mi) northwest of Kanchanaburi town. The park covers an area of 343,735 rai ~ 550 square kilometers (212 sqmi) in Sai Yok, Tha Sao and Lum Sum subdistricts in Sai Yok district, Nong Pet and Tha Kradan subdistricts in Si Sawat district and Chong Sadao subdistrict in Mueang Kanchanaburi district and neighboring (from northwest clockwise) Sai Yok National Park, Khuean Srinagarindra National Park and Salak Phra Wildlife Sanctuary.
The limestone mountains in the Tenasserim Range rise to 996 meters (3,368 ft) include: Khao Chong Pun, Khao Kro Krae, Khao Mo Thao, Khao Nong Phuk and Khao Plai Dinsor.
Streams such as: Huai Nong Kop and Huai Sa Dae flows into Srinagarind Dam, Huai Monglai and Huai Amatara flow into Erawan Waterfall, Huai Khao Phang and Huai Tap Sila, which are the sources of Khao Phang Waterfall and Sai Yok Noi Waterfall.

== History ==
The establishment of the national park was declared the 12th national park in the Royal Gazette on 19 June 1975 and came into effect the following day. This park area was further modified in 1995.

== Climate ==
The climate is influenced by southeastern monsoon in rainy season and northeastern monsoon in cold season. This park is in the rain shadow of the hills, resulting in a low average rainfall. Summer is from February to April, rainy season runs from May to October and cold season lasts from November to January.

== Flora ==
There are three types of forest, namely: Mixed deciduous forest is the general forest type with 81%, 14% is Dry evergreen forest and Dry dipterocarp forest is with 2% the smallest forest type.
Flowering plants such as Phlogacanthus pulcerrimus.

== Fauna ==
=== Mammals ===
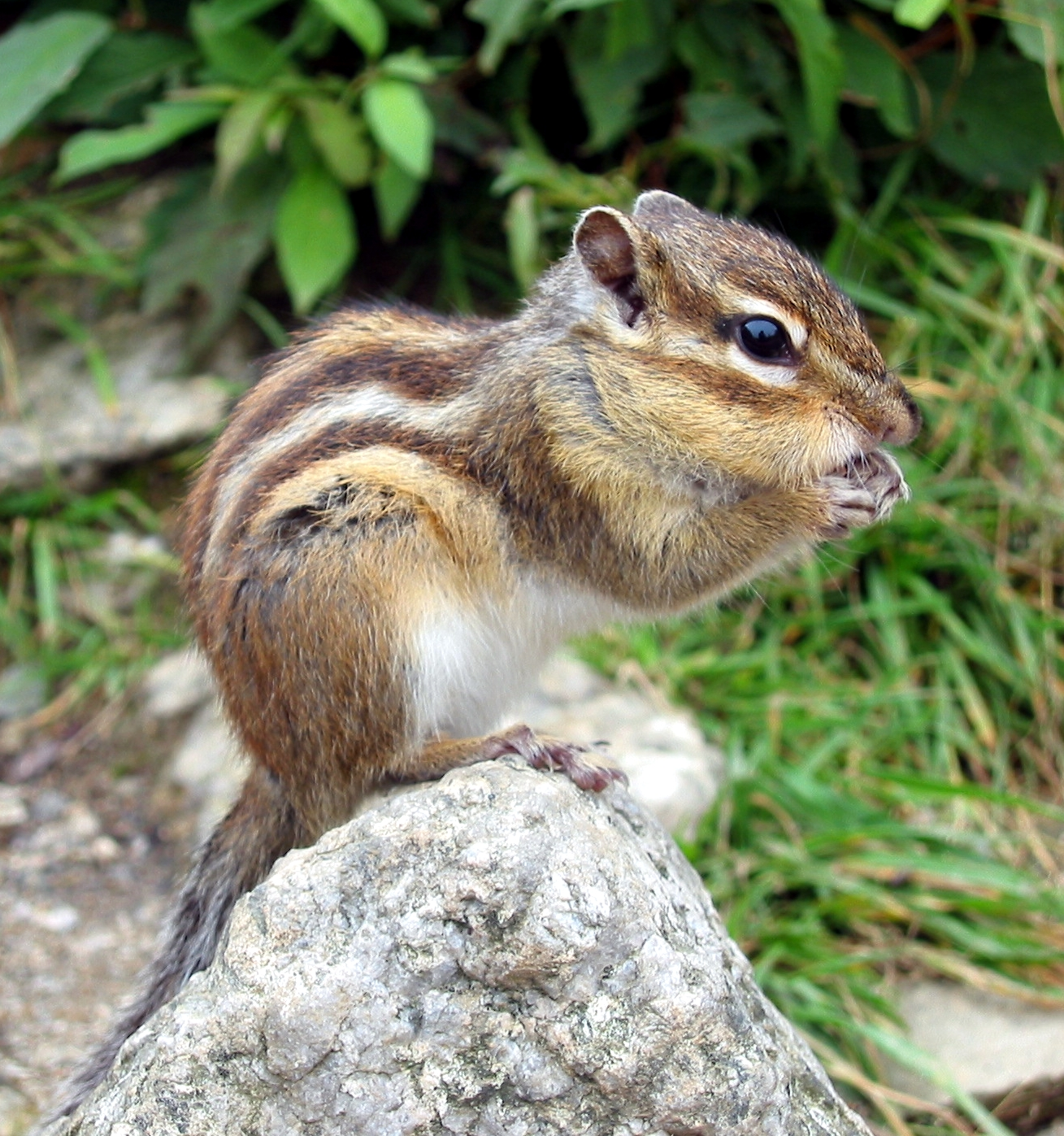
Siberian chipmunk

The number of sightings in the park are 14 species of mammals, include:

- Asian black bear
- Asian elephant
- Asian palm civet
- Bengal slow loris
- Lar gibbon
- Leopard cat
- Mainland serow
- Muntjac
- Phayre's leaf monkey
- Sambar deer
- Siberian chipmunk
- Southern pig-tailed macaque
- Treeshrew
- Wild boar

=== Birds ===
The park has some 237 species of birds from 64 families.

==== Passerine ====
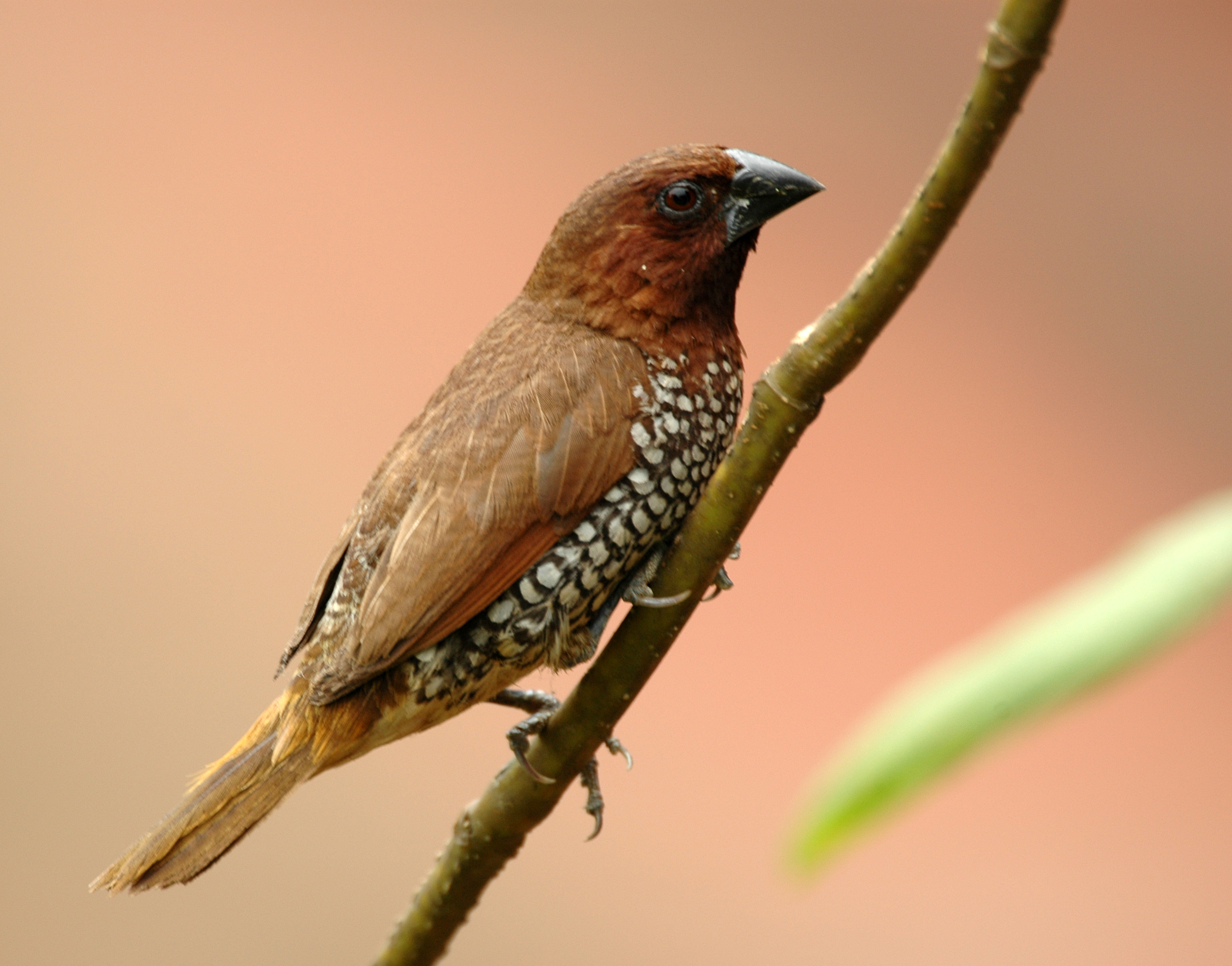
Scaly-breasted munia

133 species of passerine from 35 families, represented by one species:

- Amur stonechat
- Ashy woodswallow
- Asian fairy-bluebird
- Baya weaver
- Black-naped monarch
- Black-naped oriole
- Black-throated laughingthrush
- Blue pitta
- Burmese nuthatch
- Burmese shrike
- Common hill myna
- Dusky broadbill
- Eastern red-rumped swallow
- Eurasian tree sparrow
- Golden-fronted leafbird
- Grey-headed canary-flycatcher
- Great iora
- Large woodshrike
- Olive-backed pipit
- Oriental cuckooshrike
- Oriental reed warbler
- Puff-throated babbler
- Purple sunbird
- Racket-tailed treepie
- Rufescent prinia
- Rufous-fronted babbler
- Scaly-breasted munia
- Scarlet-backed flowerpecker
- Short-tailed drongo
- Striated bulbul
- Striated yuhina
- Sulphur-breasted warbler
- White-throated fantail
- Yellow-bellied warbler
- Yellow-cheeked tit

==== Non-passerine ====
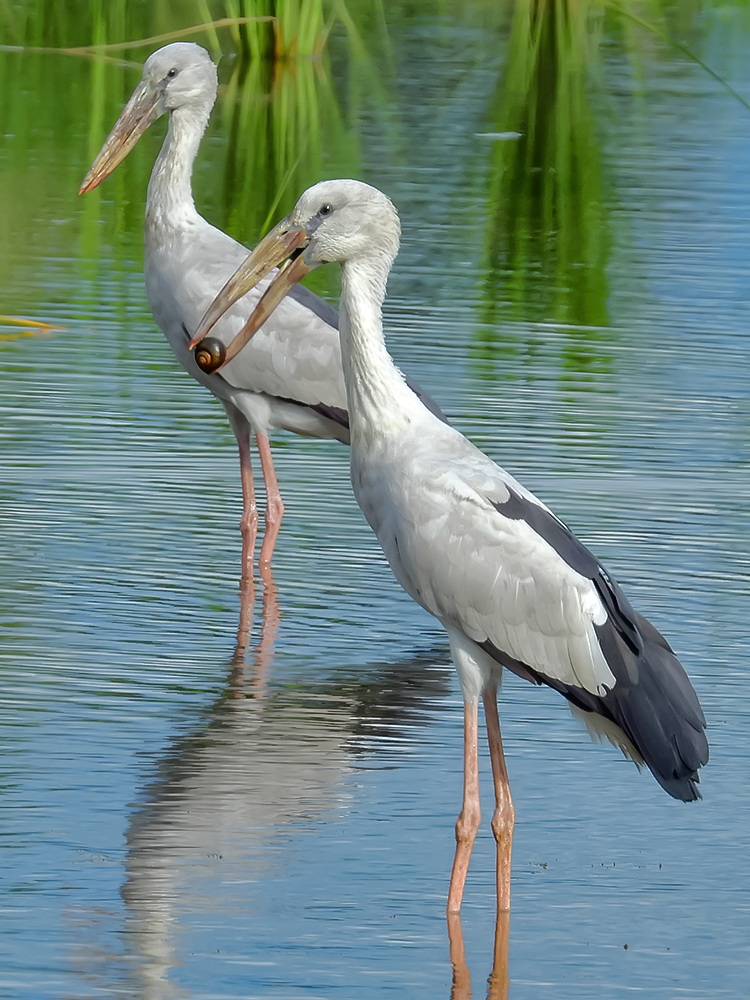
Asian openbill

104 species of non-passerine from 29 families, represented by one species:

- Asian openbill
- Barred buttonquail
- Black baza
- Black-winged stilt
- Blue-tailed bee-eater
- Chinese pond-heron
- Collared scops-owl
- Crested treeswift
- Eastern barn owl
- Eurasian hoopoe
- Greater coucal
- Great hornbill
- Green sandpiper
- Indochinese roller
- Laced woodpecker
- Large-tailed nightjar
- Lesser whistling-duck
- Lineated barbet
- Little cormorant
- Little grebe
- Orange-breasted trogon
- Pacific swift
- Peregrine falcon
- Red junglefowl
- River lapwing
- Stork-billed kingfisher
- Vernal hanging-parrot
- White-breasted waterhen
- Zebra dove

=== Reptiles ===
The number of sightings in the park are seven species of reptiles, include:

- Banded krait
- Blue-crested lizard
- Burmese python
- Indo-Chinese rat snake
- King cobra
- Many-lined sun skink
- Southeast Asian softshell turtle

=== Amphibians ===
- Asian common toad
- Green puddle frog
- Tree frog

=== Crustacea ===
- Crab of Tenasserim
- Kanchanaburi crab
- Waterfall crab

=== Fishes ===
- Java barb
- Nandus nandus
- Spotted barb
- Tor tambroides

== Attractions ==
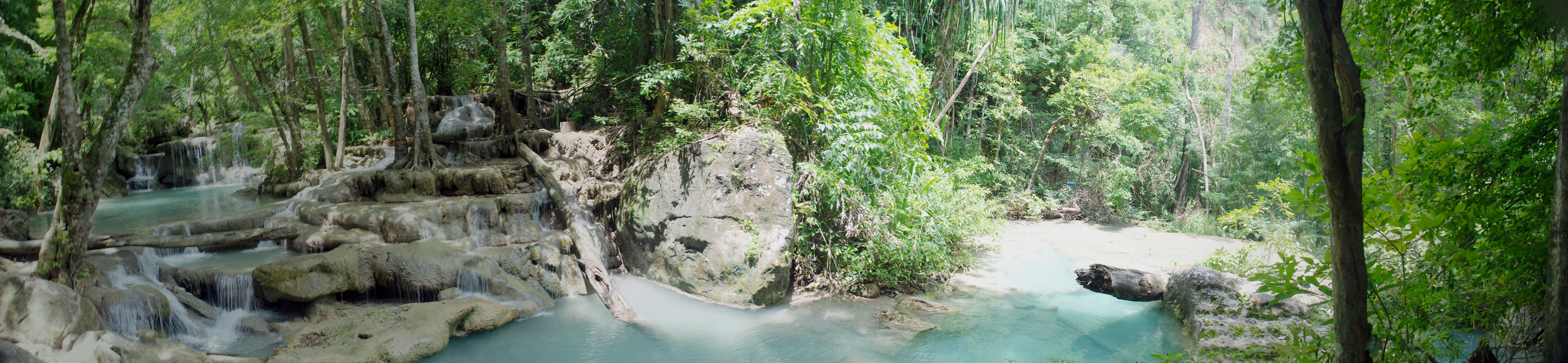
Tier five, Erawan Waterfall

The major attraction of the park is Erawan Falls, a waterfall named after Erawan, the three-headed white elephant of Hindu mythology. The waterfalls have seven tiers, and the water flows out of three spouts. These spouts resemble the three heads of Erawan. The first through sixth tiers are accessible via a trail that begins at the park visitor center, and visitors are able to swim in the many pools and ponds along the river. Garra rufa (also known as Doctor fish or Pedicure fish) are prolific throughout. The distance from the trailhead to the top tier of the waterfall is 1.5km (0.9 miles).

There are four caves in the park: Mi, Rua, Wang Badan, and Phra That. Phra That is 12km (1.25 miles) west of the visitor center, and is accessible via a concrete path that begins at the Ranger's Station. The cave is 544 meters (0.33 miles) long. Wang Badan, 744 meters (<0.5 miles) long, is on the southeast side of the park and is not accessible to visitors. Rising northeast of the waterfall area there is a breast-shaped hill named Khao Nom Nang.

== Location ==
Erawan National Park in overview PARO 3 (Ban Pong)

3) Erawan National Park in overview PARO 3 (Ban Pong)

	National park
1	Thai Prachan
2	Chaloem Rattanakosin
3	Erawan
4	Khao Laem
5	Khuean Srinagarindra
6	Lam Khlong Ngu
7	Phu Toei
8	Sai Yok
9	Thong Pha Phum

	Wildlife sanctuary
10	Mae Nam Phachi
11	Salak Phra
12	Thung Yai Naresuan West
	Forest park
22	Phra Thaen Dong Rang
23	Phu Muang
24	Tham Khao Noi

	Non-hunting area
13	Bueng Kroengkawia– Nong Nam Sap
14	Bueng Chawak
15	Khao Pratap Chang
16	Phantai Norasing
17	Somdet Phra Srinagarindra
18	Tham Khang Khao– Khao Chong Phran
19	Tham Lawa– Tham Daowadueng
20	Wat Rat Sattha Kayaram
21	Wat Tham Rakhang– Khao Phra Non

== See also ==
- IUCN protected area categories
- List of national parks of Thailand
- DNP - Erawan National Park
- PARO 3 (Ban Pong)
- Western Forest Complex

== Further reads ==
- Notebook, BeautifulbEq. Notebook: Beautiful Waterfalls in the Erawan National Park in Tha, Journal for Writing, College Ruled Size 6 X 9, 110 Pages. N.p., Independently Published, 2020.
- Atiyah, Jeremy. Southeast Asia. United Kingdom, Rough Guides, 2002.
