= Johannes Govertus de Man =

Dutch zoologist (1850-1930)

Johannes Govertus de Man (2 May 1850 in Middelburg – 9 January 1930 in Middelburg), was a Dutch biologist. He was assistant curator at the Rijksmuseum van Natuurlijke Historie (Dutch for national natural history museum) in Leiden, where he specialised in free-living nematodes and decapod crustaceans, although he also wrote papers on flatworms, sipunculids and, in his dissertation only, vertebrates. His change away from vertebrates disappointed the director of the museum, and de Man left his job there after eleven years. For the rest of his life, de Man worked at his parents' house in Middelburg and later at a house near the shore at Yerseke in the Oosterschelde estuary, relying on his family's private income.

== Taxa named after de Man ==
- Anachis demani De Jong & Coomans, 1988
- Anchistus demani Kemp, 1922
- Araeolaimus demani (Schuurmans-Stekhoven, 1950) Wieser, 1956
- Axonolaimus demani De Coninck & Stekhoven, 1933
- Caridina demani J. Roux, 1911
- Charybdis (Goniosoma) demani Leene, 1937
- Chromadorina demani Inglis, 1962
- Clibanarius demani Buitendijk, 1937
- Criconema demani Micoletzky, 1925
- Demania Laurie, 1906
- Demaniella Steiner, 1914
- Demanietta Bott, 1966
- Demanietta manii (Rathbun, 1904)
- Dracograllus demani Allen & Noffsinger, 1978
- Dromia (Cryptodromia) de Manii Alcock, 1899 (a synonym of Cryptodromia amboinensis De Man, 1888)
- Eleutherolaimus demani (Rouville, 1903)
- Engina demani De Jong & Coomans, 1988
- Etisus demani Odhner, 1925
- Exopalaemon mani (Sollaud, 1914)
- Gonodactylellus demanii (Henderson, 1893)
- Hemicycliophora demanii (Edward & Rai, 1971)
- Labuanium demani (Bürger, 1893)
- Manella Rathbun, 1906
- Metapenaeus demani (J. Roux, 1922)
- Metoncholaimus demani (Zur Strassen, 1894)
- Molgolaimus demani Jensen, 1978
- Neoliomera demani Forest & Guinot, 1962
- Palaemon sundaicus De Mani Nobili, 1899 (a synonym of Macrobrachium equidens (Dana, 1852))
- Panulirus demani Borradaile, 1899 (a synonym of P. versicolor (Latreille, 1804))
- Percnon demani Ward, 1934
- Periclimenes demani Kemp, 1915
- Petrarctus demani (Holthuis, 1963)
- Phascolosoma (Satonus) demanni (Sluiter, 1891)
- Pontophilus demani Chace, 1984
- Processa demani Hayashi, 1975
- Pseudocollodes demani Balss, 1929
- Rhabdodemania Baylis & Daubney, 1926
- Richtersia demani Stekhoven, 1935
- Sabatieria demani Bresslau & Stekhoven in Stekoven, 1935
- Scyllarus demani Holthuis, 1946
- Synalpheus demani Borradaile, 1899
- Thalamita de Mani Nobili, 1905 (a synonym of T. invicta Thallwitz, 1891)
- Tricoma demanema, Chromadorita demaniana Filipjev, 1922
- Uca demani Ortmann, 1897
- Uca manii Rathbun, 1909 (a synonym of U. forcipata (Adams & White, 1848))
- Urocaris de Mani Balss, 1916 (a synonym of Periclimenes scriptus (Risso, 1822))
- Vir Holthuis, 1952 (Latin vir = man)
- Xantho demani Odhner, 1925 (a synonym of Lachnopodus subacutus (Stimpson, 1858))
- Zozymodea demani (Odhner, 1925)

== Taxa named by de Man ==
Species described by de Man

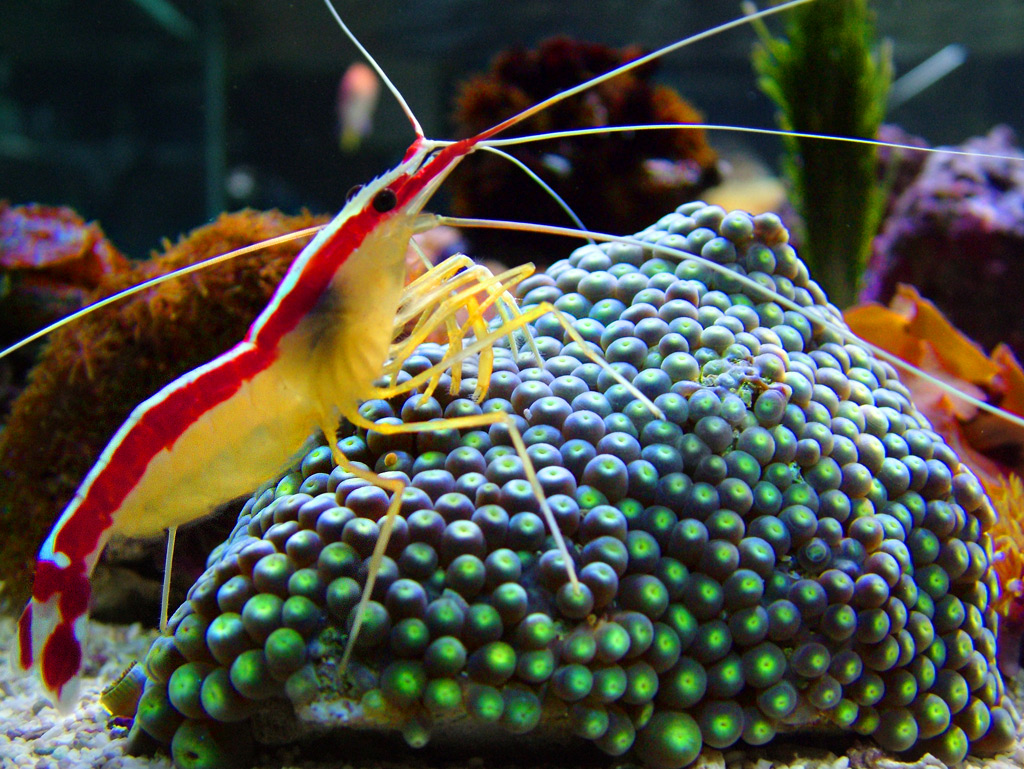
Lysmata amboinensis

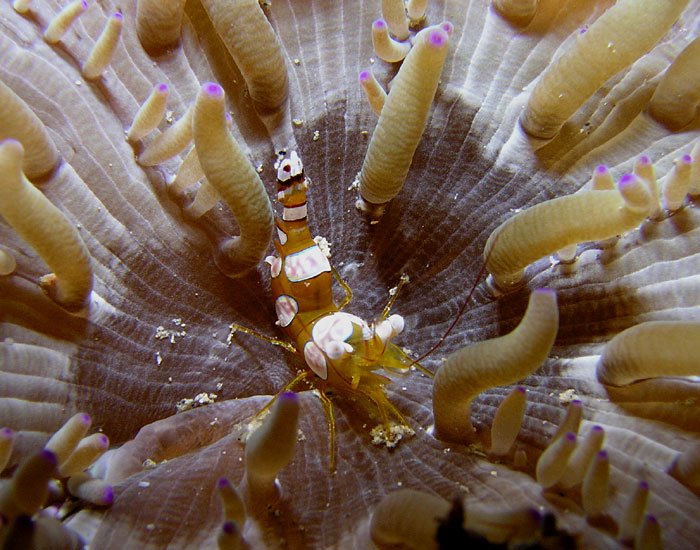
Thor amboinensis

De Man described many new taxa in his lifetime, mostly for crustaceans and nematodes. His crustacean taxa include 30 genera and 523 new species, while his nematode taxa comprise 8 new families, 61 new genera and 239 new species. Taxa described by de Man include:

- Alope orientalis De Man, 1906
- Alpheus rapacida De Man, 1908
- Caridina gracilirostris De Man, 1892
- Caridina serratirostris De Man, 1892
- Cuapetes amymone De Man, 1902
- Eiconaxius sibogae De Man, 1925
- Geosesarma De Man, 1892
- Laomenes amboinensis (De Man, 1888)
- Lysmata amboinensis De Man, 1888
- Macrobrachium rosenbergii (De Man, 1879)
- Neosarmatium inerme De Man, 1887
- Neosarmatium meinerti De Man, 1887
- Palinurellus wieneckii (De Man, 1881)
- Perisesarma De Man, 1895
- Sesarma eulimene De Man, 1895
- Thor amboinensis (De Man, 1888)
