= Maundrell =

Maundrell is a surname. Notable people with the surname include:

- Henry Maundrell (1665–1701), English travel writer
- William Maundrell (1876–1958), English cricketer

== See also ==
- Mandrell
