= Mandrella =

Mandrella is a surname. Notable people with the surname include:

- Ann Mandrella (born 1971), French politician
- David Mandrella (born 2001), German politician

== See also ==
- Mandrell
- Mandrel
- Manella
- Mandela
