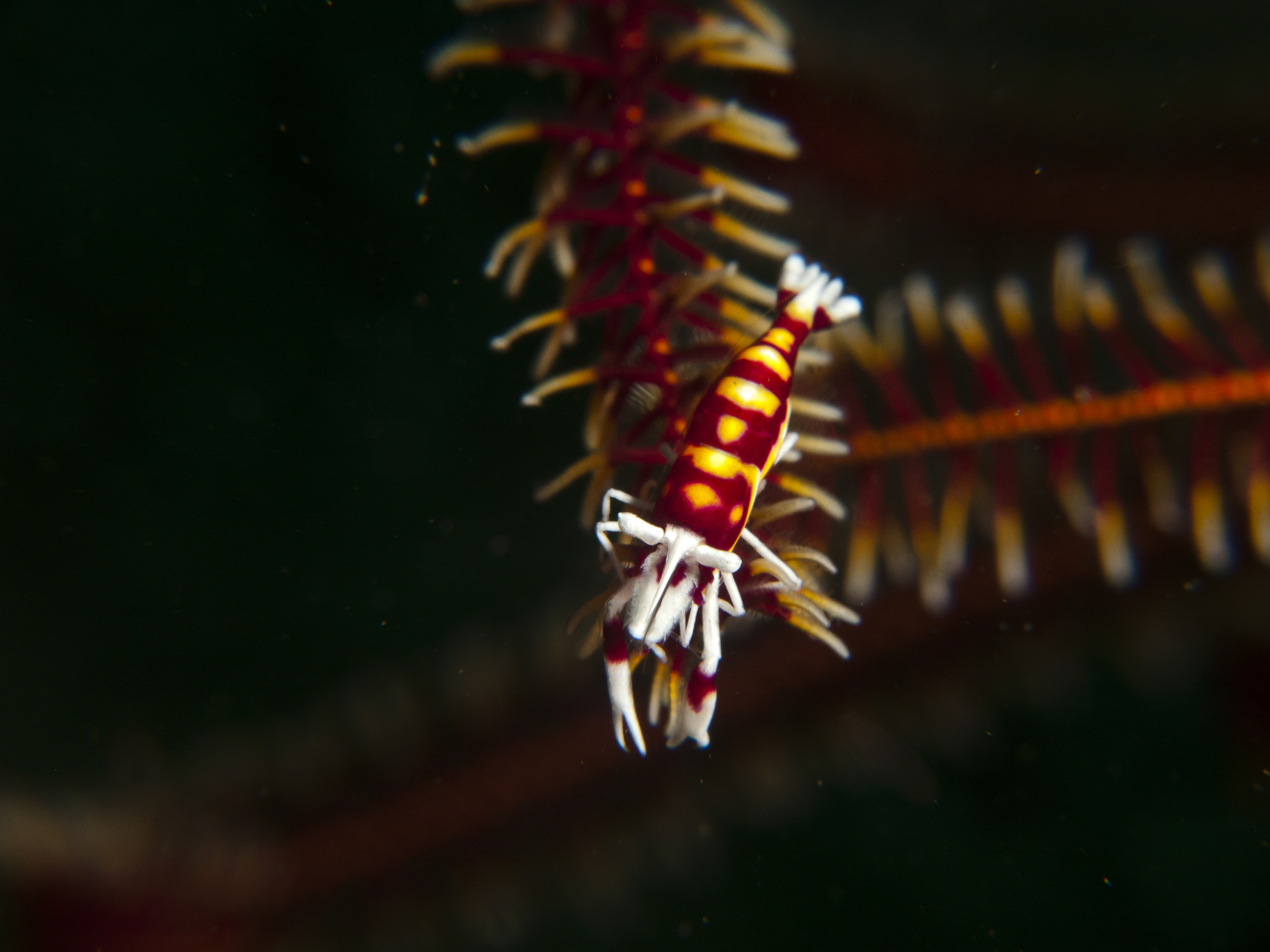

Scientific classification
- Domain: Eukaryota
- Kingdom: Animalia
- Phylum: Arthropoda
- Class: Malacostraca
- Order: Decapoda
- Suborder: Pleocyemata
- Infraorder: Caridea
- Family: Palaemonidae
- Genus: Laomenes
- Species: L. cornutus

Binomial name
- Laomenes cornutus Borradaile, 1915

= Laomenes cornutus =

Species of crustacean

Laomenes cornutus is a species of saltwater shrimp that is found in the Maldives and Australia that was first described in 1915.
