= Cuapetes agag =

Scientific classification
- Domain: Eukaryota
- Kingdom: Animalia
- Phylum: Arthropoda
- Class: Malacostraca
- Order: Decapoda
- Suborder: Pleocyemata
- Infraorder: Caridea
- Family: Palaemonidae
- Genus: Cuapetes
- Species: C. agag

Binomial name
- Cuapetes agag (Kemp, 1922)

Species of crustacean

Cuapetes agag is a species of shrimp found in New Caledonia, Melanesia, Queensland, and the Red Sea. It was first named by Kemp in 1922.
