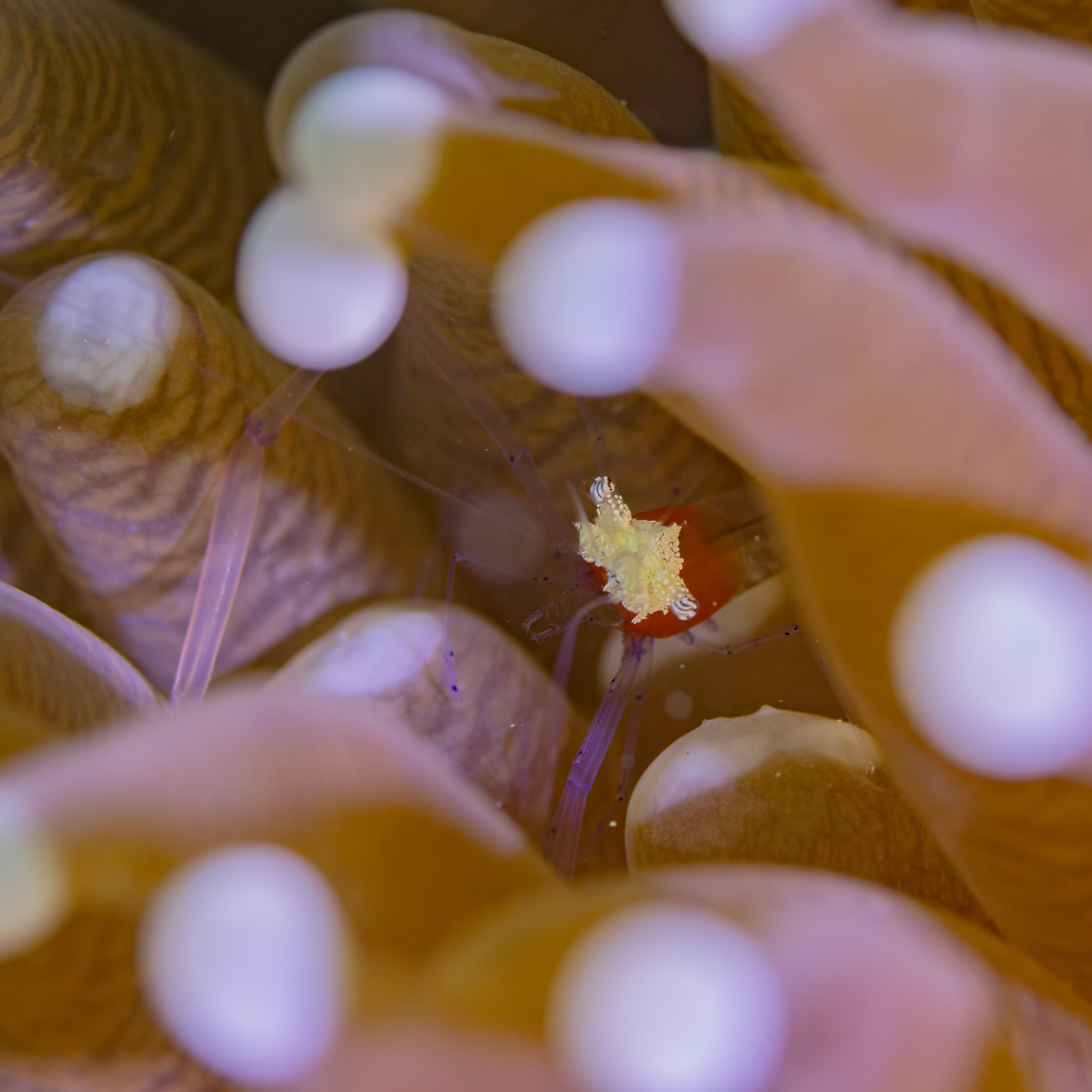
- Cuapetes kororensis

Scientific classification
- Domain: Eukaryota
- Kingdom: Animalia
- Phylum: Arthropoda
- Class: Malacostraca
- Order: Decapoda
- Suborder: Pleocyemata
- Infraorder: Caridea
- Family: Palaemonidae
- Genus: Cuapetes; Clark, 1919

Synonyms
- Falciger Borradaile, 1915; Kemponia Bruce, 2004

= Cuapetes =

Genus of crustaceans

Cuapetes is a genus of shrimp in the family Palaemonidae, first described by Austin Hobart Clark in 1919. WoRMS accepts the following species:

- Cuapetes agag (Kemp, 1922)
- Cuapetes akiensis (Kubo, 1936)
- Cuapetes americanus (Kingsley, 1878)
- Cuapetes amymone (De Man, 1902)
- Cuapetes anacanthus (Bruce, 1988)
- Cuapetes andamanensis (Kemp, 1922)
- Cuapetes calmani (Tattersall, 1921)
- Cuapetes darwiniensis (Bruce, 1987)
- Cuapetes demani (Kemp, 1915)
- Cuapetes edwardsii (Paul'son, 1875)
- Cuapetes elegans (Paul'son, 1875)
- Cuapetes ensifrons (Dana, 1852)
- Cuapetes grandis (Stimpson, 1860)
- Cuapetes johnsoni (Bruce, 1987)
- Cuapetes kororensis (Bruce, 1977)
- Cuapetes lacertae (Bruce, 1992)
- Cuapetes lanceolatus Okuno & Chan, 2012
- Cuapetes longirostris (Borradaile, 1915)
- Cuapetes nilandensis (Borradaile, 1915)
- Cuapetes paulsoni (Bruce, 2003)
- Cuapetes platycheles (Holthuis, 1952)
- Cuapetes rapanui (Fransen, 1987)
- Cuapetes seychellensis (Borradaile, 1915)
- Cuapetes suvadivensis (Borradaile, 1915)
- Cuapetes takedai Okuno, 2012
- Cuapetes tenuipes (Borradaile, 1898)
- Cuapetes uncinatus Bruce, 2012
- Cuapetes ungujaensis (Bruce, 1969)
- Cuapetes yapiensis Bruce, 2013
