= Cuapetes lacertae =

Scientific classification
- Domain: Eukaryota
- Kingdom: Animalia
- Phylum: Arthropoda
- Class: Malacostraca
- Order: Decapoda
- Suborder: Pleocyemata
- Infraorder: Caridea
- Family: Palaemonidae
- Genus: Cuapetes
- Species: C. lacertae

Binomial name
- Cuapetes lacertae Bruce, 1992

Species of crustacean

Cuapetes lacertae, previously known as Periclimenes lacertae, is a species of shrimp belonging to the family Palaemonidae. Its name is due to the fact the first specimen was collected from Lizard Island: lacerta being Latin for "lizard".

== Description ==
Medium-sized shrimp, slender, subcylindrical body form. Approximate total length is 21 millimetres (0.83 in); carapace + rostrum 10.2 millimetres (0.40 in); major second pereiopod chela 8.8 millimetres (0.35 in); minor second pereiopod chela 6 millimetres (0.24 in).

== Distribution ==
This species is known from Lizard Island, Queensland. Individuals can be found living among the tentacles of the polyps of the mushroom coral Heliofungia actiniformis.
