= Vir philippinensis =

- Photographed at a depth of 19 m while scuba diving in Anilao, Philippines.

Scientific classification
- Kingdom: Animalia
- Phylum: Arthropoda
- Clade: Pancrustacea
- Class: Malacostraca
- Order: Decapoda
- Suborder: Pleocyemata
- Infraorder: Caridea
- Family: Palaemonidae
- Genus: Vir
- Species: V. philippinensis

Binomial name
- Vir philippinensis Bruce & Svoboda, 1984

Species of crustacean

Vir philippinensis, sometimes referred to as the bubble coral shrimp, is a species of saltwater shrimp that was first described in 1984.

== Distribution and habitat ==
Vir philippinensis is found from the Red Sea to the Indo-Pacific, including Indonesia, Japan, Myanmar, the Philippines, Australia and Papua New Guinea. It is found in benthic zones in depths of 7–30 m (23–98 ft).

== Gallery ==
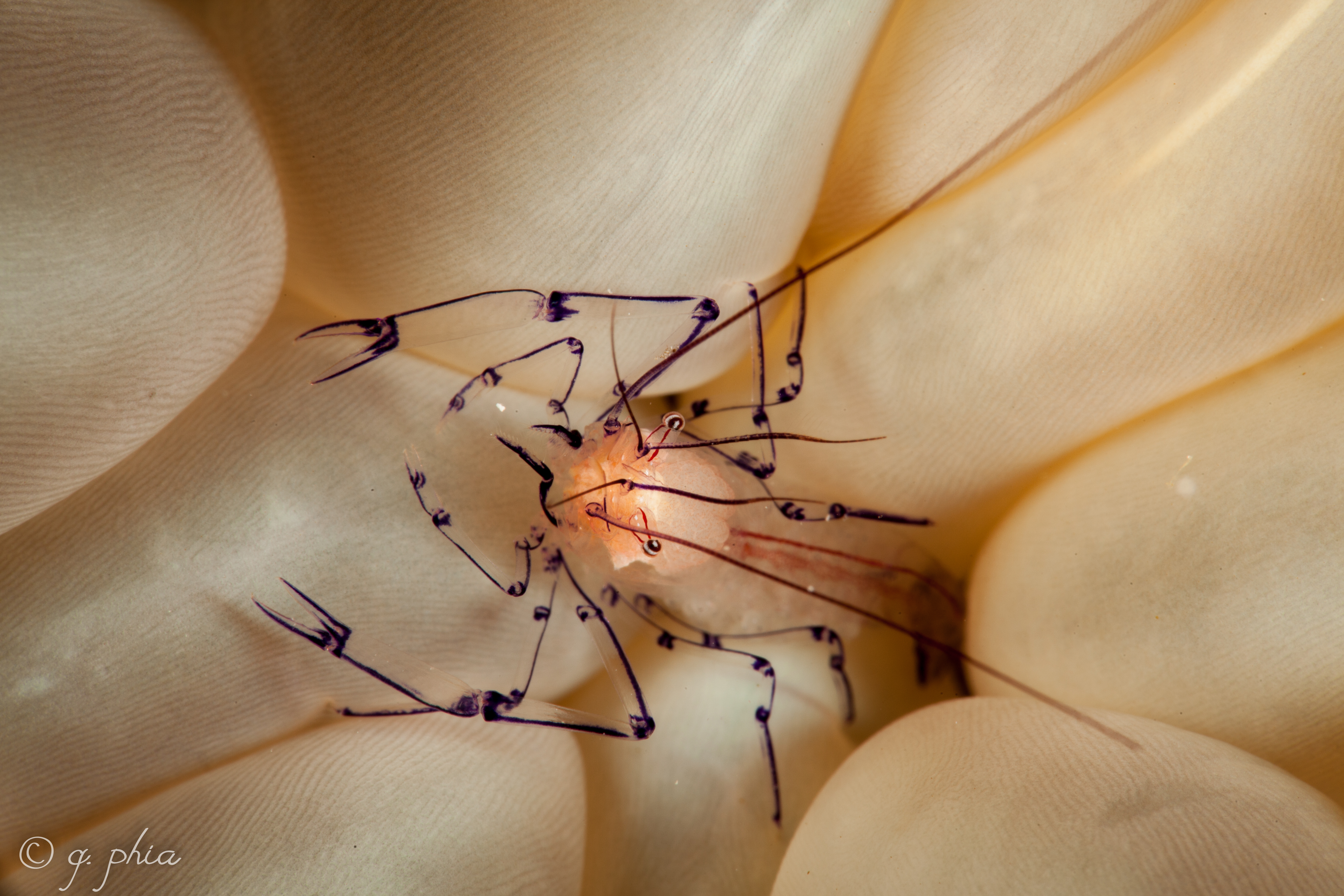
Bubble coral shrimp at Wakatobi National Park Sulawesi, 2018

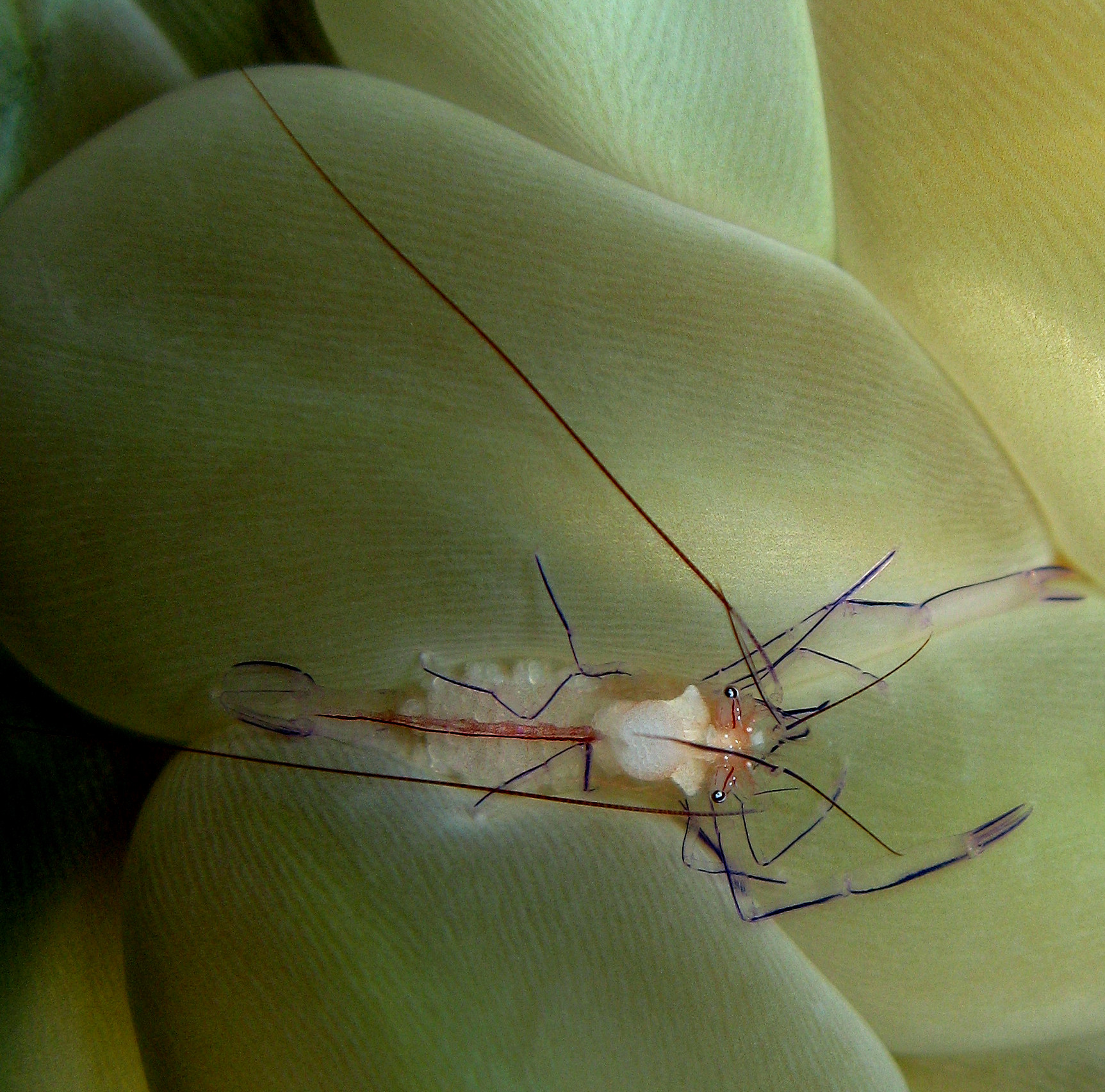
Shrimp on bubble coral

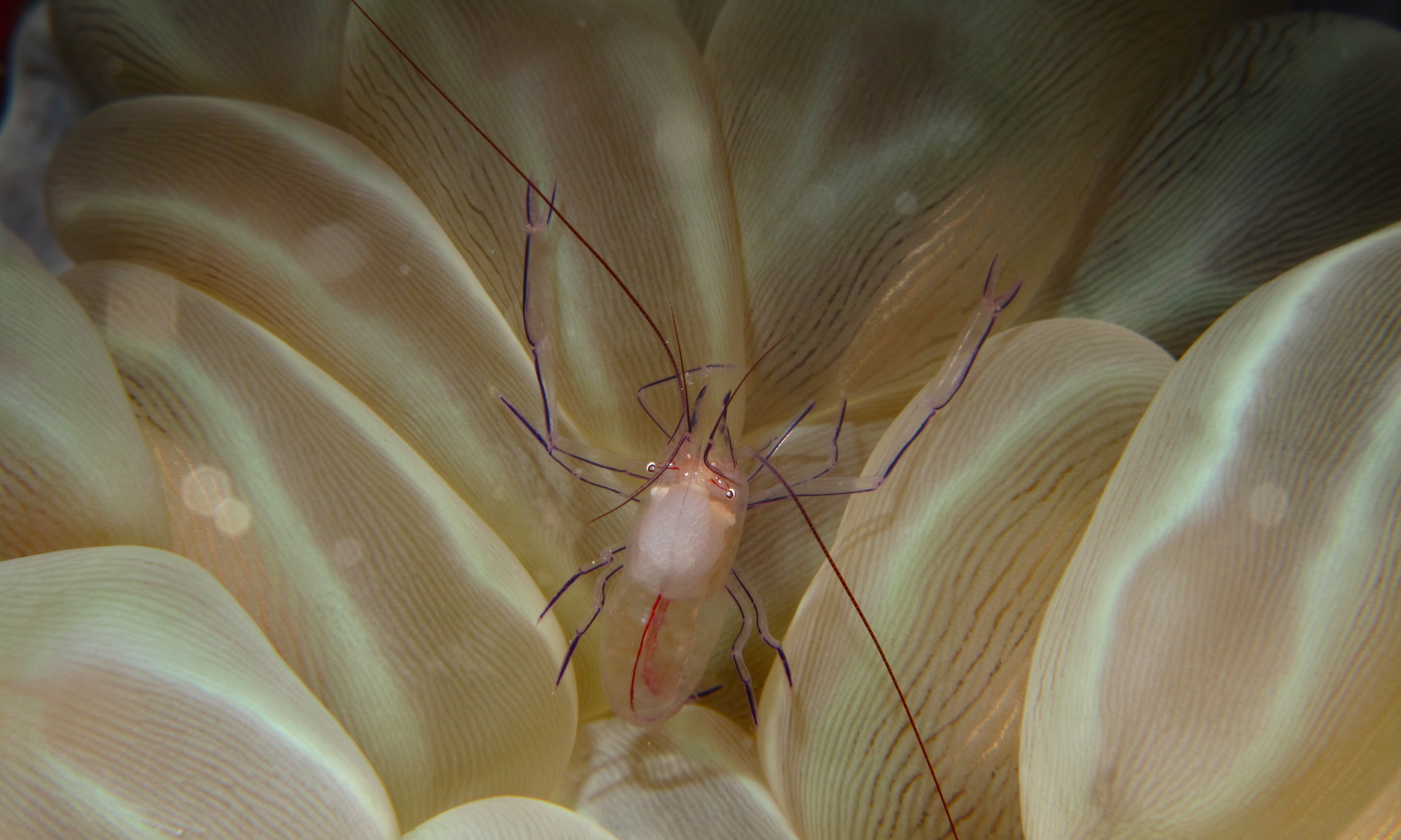
Bubble coral shrimp at Bunaken Island, Sulawesi, 2009

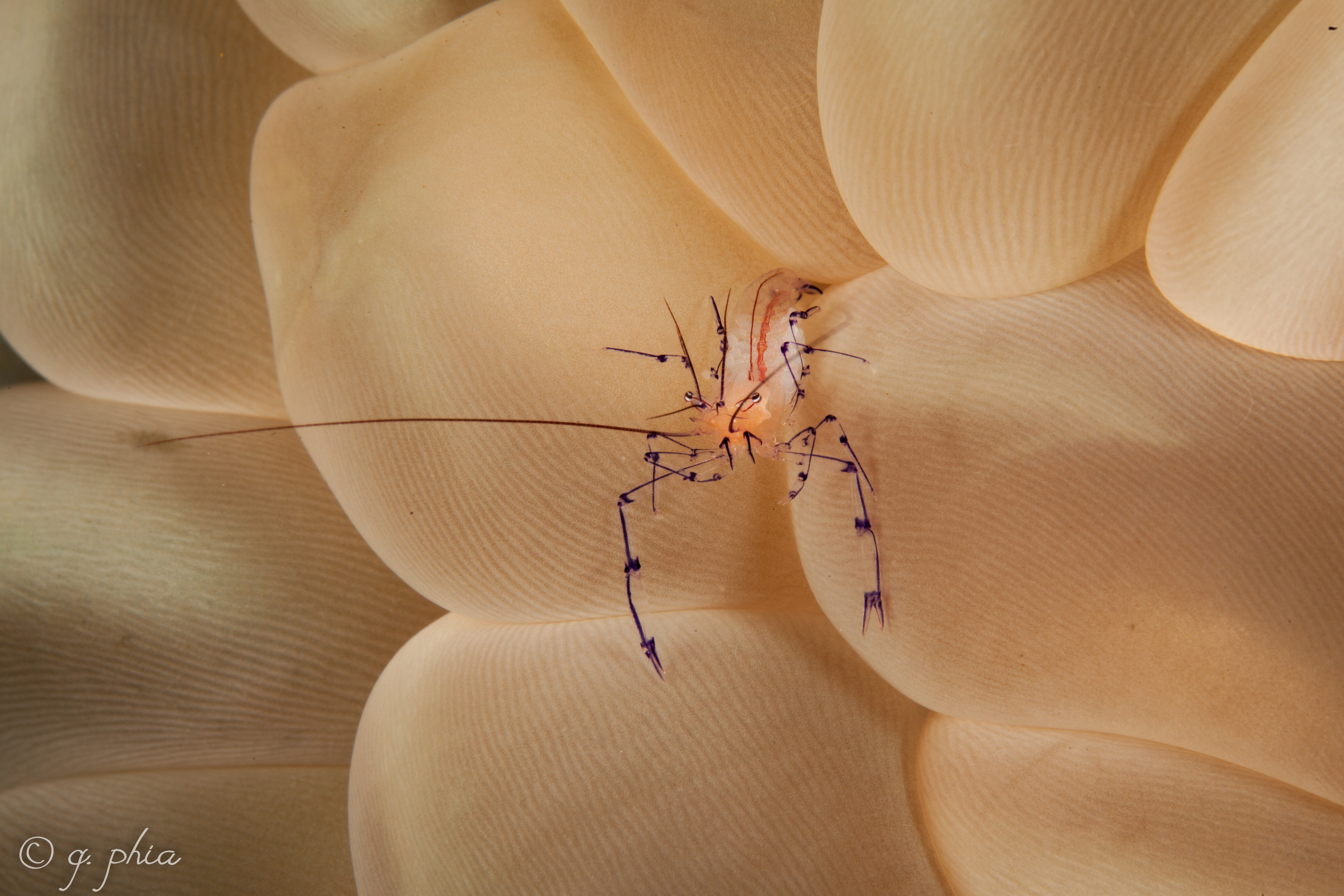
Bubble coral shrimp at Wakatobi National Park Sulawesi, 2018

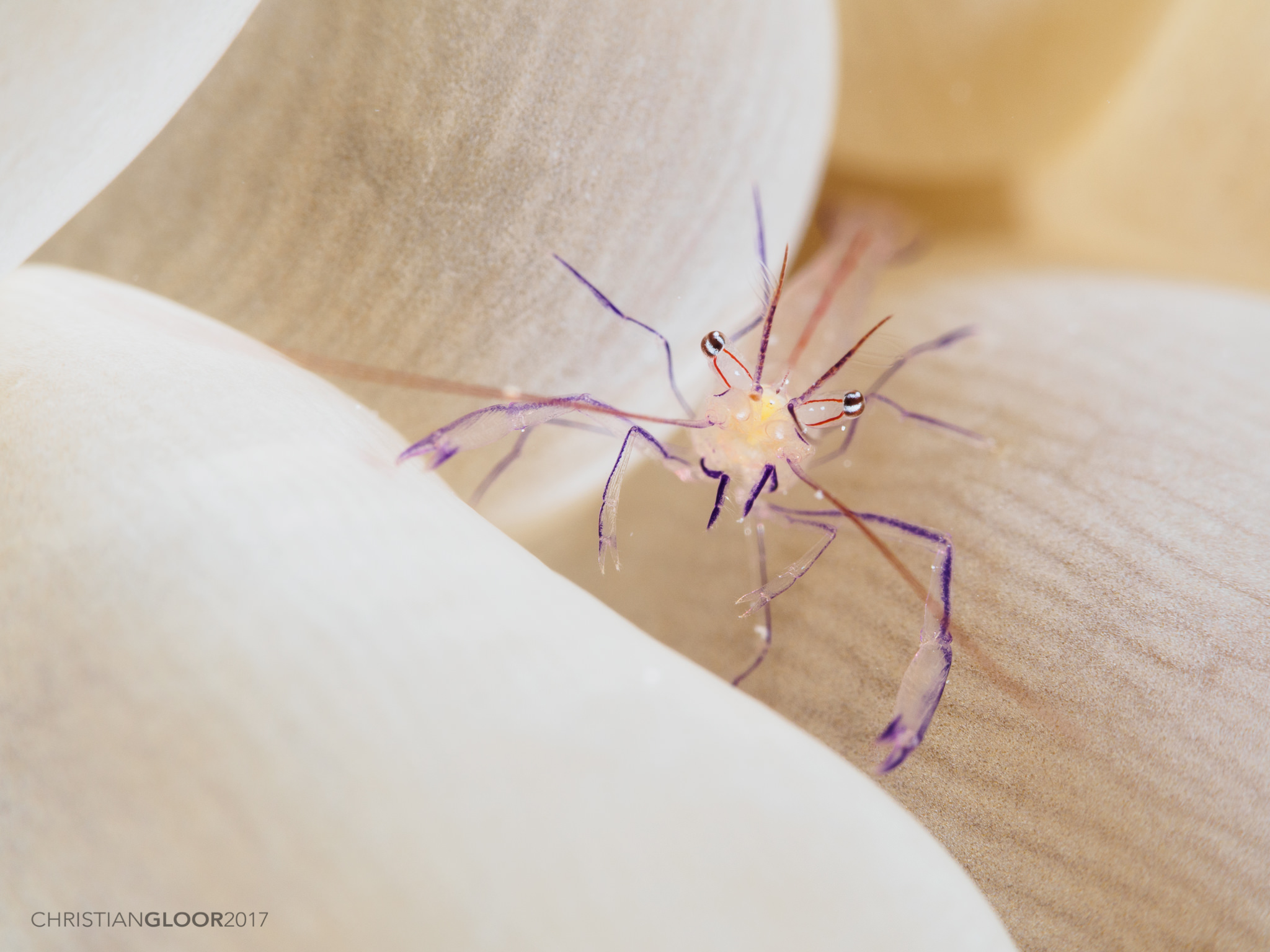
Close up of Bubble coral shrimp at Wakatobi National Park Sulawesi, 2017
