= Chiromantes eulimene =

Scientific classification
- Kingdom: Animalia
- Phylum: Arthropoda
- Class: Malacostraca
- Order: Decapoda
- Suborder: Pleocyemata
- Infraorder: Brachyura
- Family: Sesarmidae
- Genus: Chiromantes
- Species: C. eulimene

Binomial name
- Chiromantes eulimene (De Man in Weber, 1897)

Synonyms
- Sesarma eulimene De Man, 1895

Species of crab

Chiromantes eulimene is a species of crab found in the mangrove swamps of south-eastern Africa (South Africa and Mozambique).

== Distribution ==
The range of C. eulimene extends from the Bashee to the Inhambane mangroves and includes the mangroves of KwaZulu-Natal where it occurs abundantly.

== Description ==
Chiromantes eulimene has a light brown carapace with light orange-yellow chelae. They can be distinguished from the closely related Parasesarma catenatum by the absence of fur around the hinges of the chelae.
