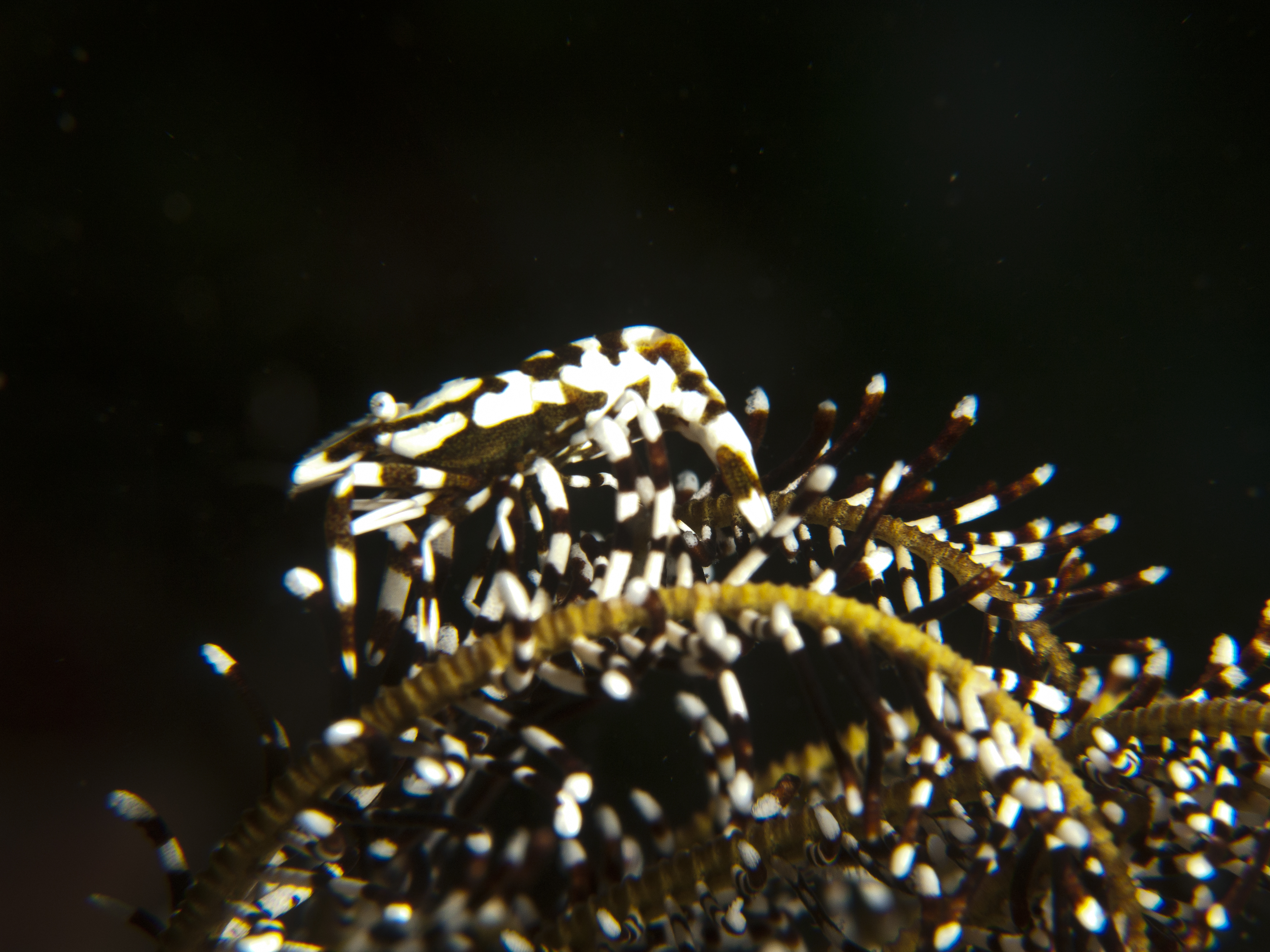
- A Laomenes cornutus

Scientific classification
- Domain: Eukaryota
- Kingdom: Animalia
- Phylum: Arthropoda
- Class: Malacostraca
- Order: Decapoda
- Suborder: Pleocyemata
- Infraorder: Caridea
- Family: Palaemonidae
- Genus: Laomenes; Clark, 1919

Synonyms
- Corniger Borradaile, 1915; Parapontonia Bruce, 1968

= Laomenes =

Genus of Malacostraca

Laomenes is a genus of shrimp comprising the following species:

- Laomenes amboinensis (De Man, 1888) - Ambon crinoid shrimp
- Laomenes ceratophthalmus (Borradaile, 1915)
- Laomenes clarki (Marin, 2009)
- Laomenes cornutus (Borradaile, 1915)
- Laomenes holthuisi (Marin & Okuno, 2010)
- Laomenes jackhintoni (Bruce, 2006)
- Laomenes nudirostris (Bruce, 1968)
- Laomenes pardus (Marin, 2009)
- Laomenes tigris (Marin, 2009) - tiger crinoid shrimp
