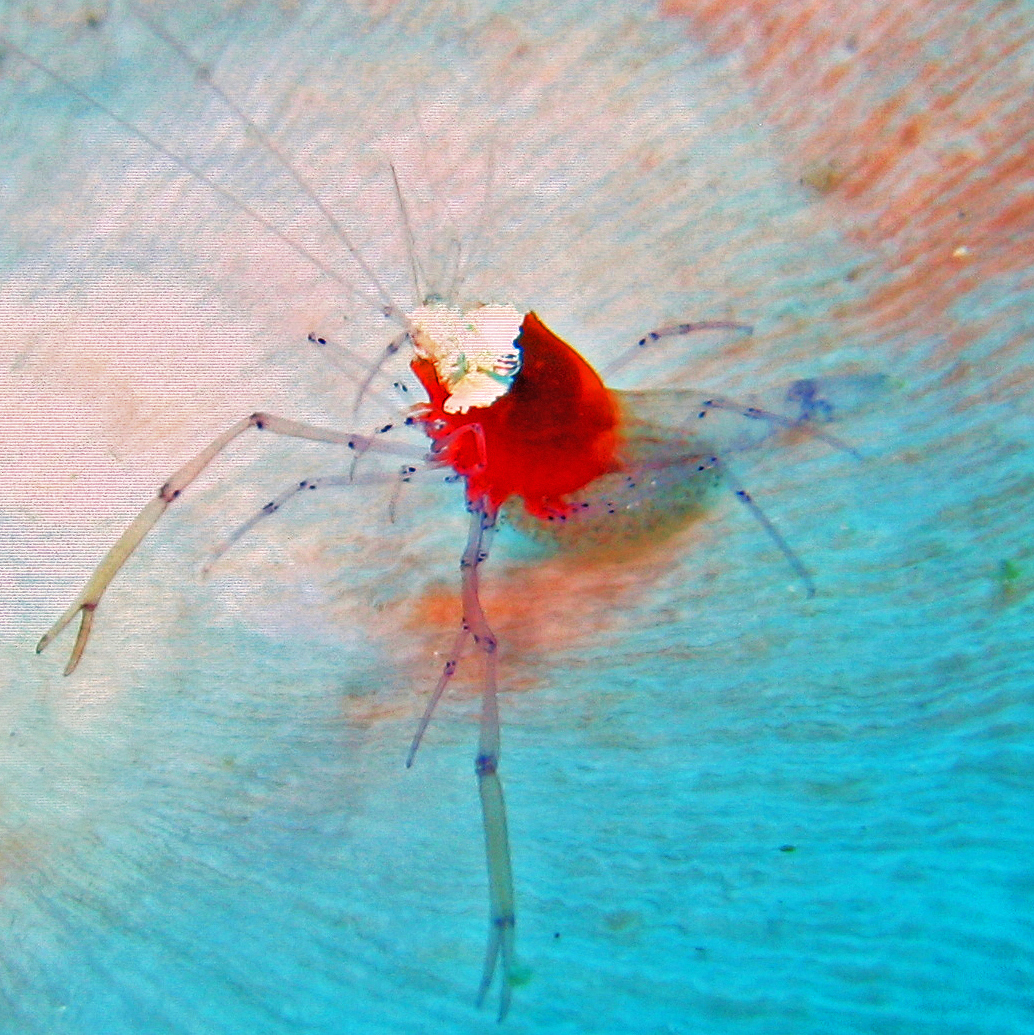

Scientific classification
- Domain: Eukaryota
- Kingdom: Animalia
- Phylum: Arthropoda
- Class: Malacostraca
- Order: Decapoda
- Suborder: Pleocyemata
- Infraorder: Caridea
- Family: Palaemonidae
- Genus: Cuapetes
- Species: C. kororensis

Binomial name
- Cuapetes kororensis (Bruce, 1977)

= Cuapetes kororensis =

Species of crustacean

Cuapetes kororensis, the mushroom coral shrimp, is a shrimp species in the genus Cuapetes.

This species is widespread all throughout the Western Central Pacific (Australia, Bunaken, Great Barrier Reef, Indonesia, Indo-Pacific, Coral Sea, Lembeh Strait, Marshall Islands, New Caledonia, Philippines, Queensland, Red Sea, Western Pacific).
