= Cuapetes amymone =

Scientific classification
- Domain: Eukaryota
- Kingdom: Animalia
- Phylum: Arthropoda
- Class: Malacostraca
- Order: Decapoda
- Suborder: Pleocyemata
- Infraorder: Caridea
- Family: Palaemonidae
- Genus: Cuapetes
- Species: C. amymone

Binomial name
- Cuapetes amymone (De Man, 1902)

Species of crustacean

Cuapetes amymone is a species of shrimp found in the Pacific and Indian Oceans. It was first named by Johannes Govertus de Man in 1902.
