= Cuapetes elegans =

Scientific classification
- Domain: Eukaryota
- Kingdom: Animalia
- Phylum: Arthropoda
- Class: Malacostraca
- Order: Decapoda
- Suborder: Pleocyemata
- Infraorder: Caridea
- Family: Palaemonidae
- Genus: Cuapetes
- Species: C. elegans

Binomial name
- Cuapetes elegans Paul'son, 1875

Synonyms
- Periclimenes (Falciger) dubius Borradaile, 1915; Periclimenes elegans (Paul'son, 1875)

Species of crustacean

Cuapetes elegans is a shrimp species in the genus Cuapetes.
