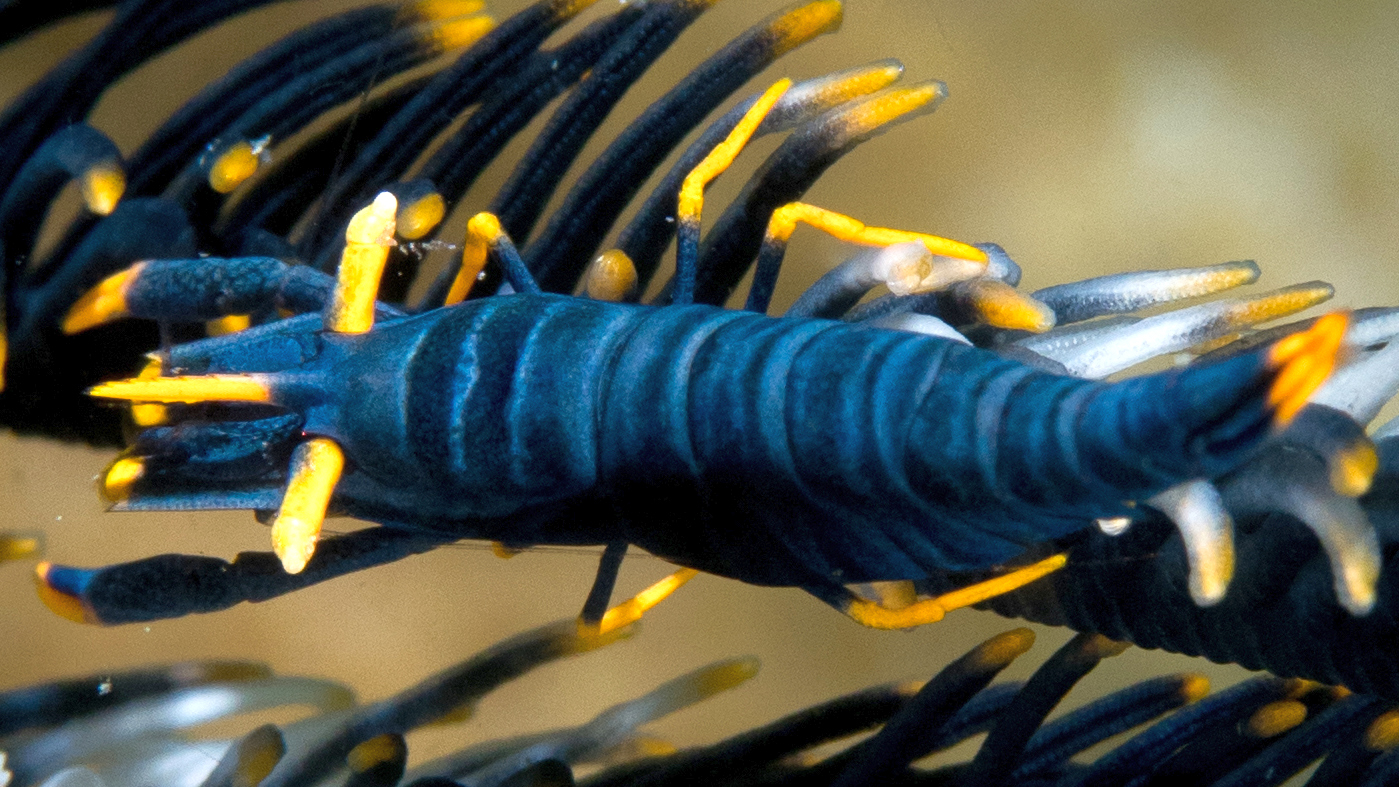

Scientific classification
- Domain: Eukaryota
- Kingdom: Animalia
- Phylum: Arthropoda
- Class: Malacostraca
- Order: Decapoda
- Suborder: Pleocyemata
- Infraorder: Caridea
- Family: Palaemonidae
- Genus: Laomenes
- Species: L. amboinensi

Binomial name
- Laomenes amboinensi (De Man, 1888)

Synonyms
- Anchistia amboinensis De Man, 1888; Periclimenes amboinensis (De Man, 1888)

= Laomenes amboinensis =

Species of crustacean

Laomenes amboinensis is a species of shrimp found in waters off Indonesia, Queensland, New Caledonia, the Marshall Islands, the Ryukyu Islands and Papua New Guinea. It was first named by Johannes Govertus de Man in 1888, as Anchistia amboinensis.
