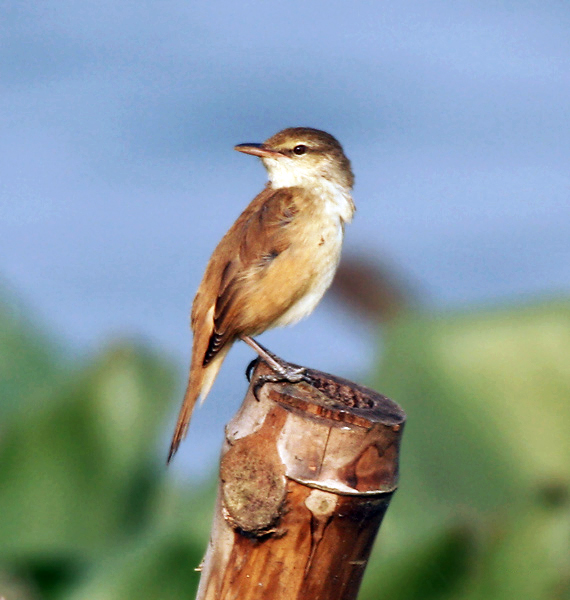
- In Kolkata, West Bengal, India.

Conservation status
- Least Concern (IUCN 3.1)

Scientific classification
- Kingdom: Animalia
- Phylum: Chordata
- Class: Aves
- Order: Passeriformes
- Family: Acrocephalidae
- Genus: Acrocephalus
- Species: A. orientalis

Binomial name
- Acrocephalus orientalis (Temminck & Schlegel, 1847)
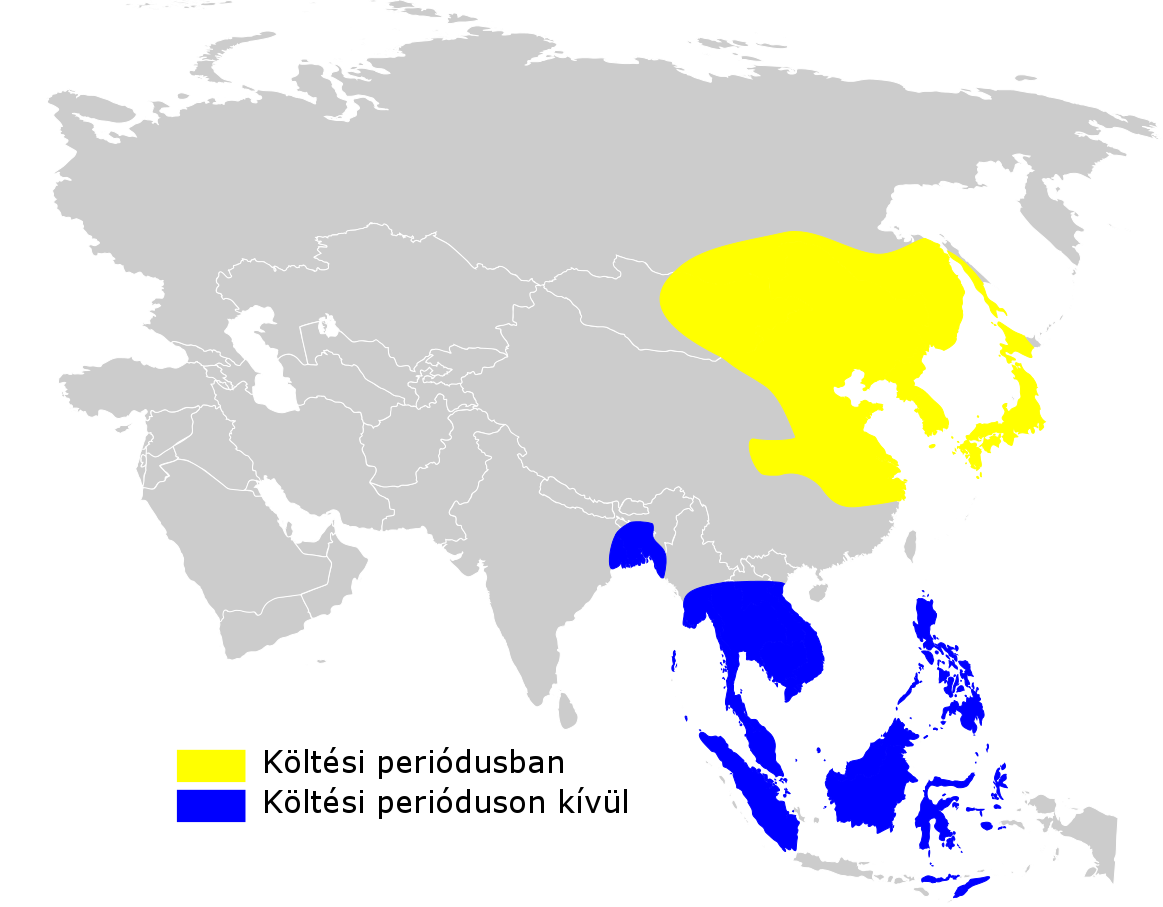
- Distribution of Oriental Reed Warbler Breeding Non-breeding

= Oriental reed warbler =

Species of bird

The Oriental reed warbler (Acrocephalus orientalis) is a passerine bird of eastern Asia belonging to the reed warbler genus Acrocephalus. It was formerly classified as a subspecies of the great reed warbler (A. arundinaceus) of the western Palearctic.

== Description ==
It is a large warbler, 18–20 cm long with a wingspan of 23–26 cm. The plumage is brown above with a paler rump and whitish tips to the tail feathers. The underparts are whitish below, browner on the flanks and undertail-coverts. There are narrow greyish streaks on the throat and breast. It has a dark eyestripe and a whitish stripe above the eye. The fairly long, heavy bill is brownish above and pink below with a bright orange gape. The feet are grey.

It is slightly smaller, slenderer and shorter-winged than the great reed warbler. Its tail is shorter and more square-ended than that of the clamorous reed warbler (A. stentoreus) and it has a slightly longer primary projection and a slightly shorter and thicker bill. The pale tip to the tail separates it from both species.

The song is a mixture of warbling phrases and guttural, croaking notes. It is given from a prominent perch such as the top of a reed stem or bush. The bird also has a loud, harsh chack call.

== Distribution and habitat ==
The breeding range covers southern Siberia, Mongolia, northern, central and eastern China, Korea and Japan. It winters in north-east India and across South-east Asia to the Philippines and Indonesia, occasionally reaching New Guinea and Australia. It has occurred as a vagrant in Israel and Kuwait. It breeds mainly in reedbeds and can also be found in marshes, paddy fields, grassland and scrub where it forages for insects and other invertebrates.

== Reproduction ==
Oriental reed warblers have small breeding territories and can achieve high population densities. The nest is built 1–1.5 metres above the ground among reed stems. Two to six eggs are laid and are incubated for 12 to 14 days. The young birds fledge after 10 to 15 days. Major predators at the nest include the Siberian weasel, cats and snakes of the genus Elaphe.

== Gallery ==
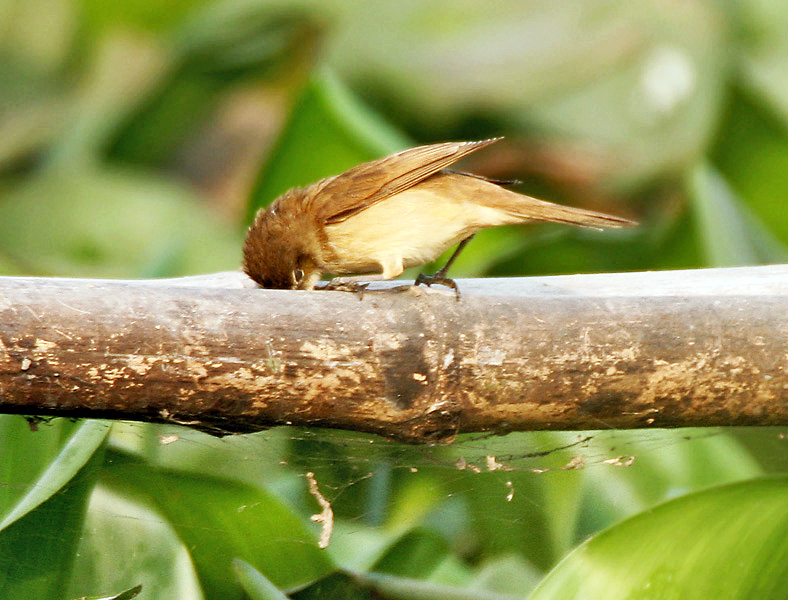
In Kolkata, West Bengal, India.

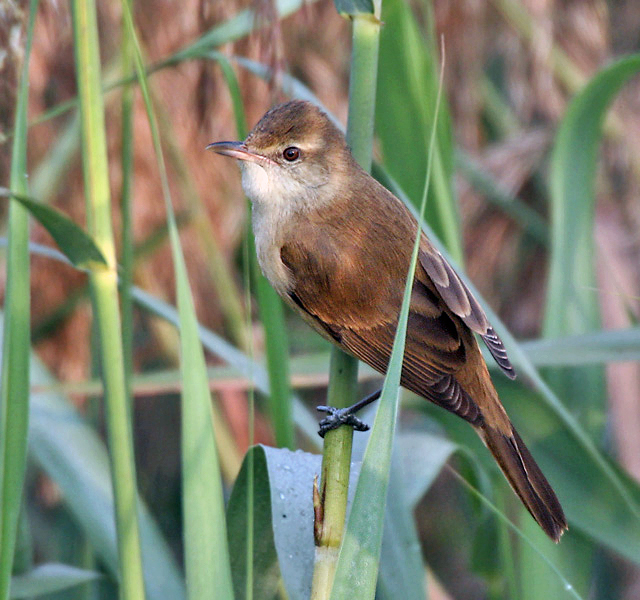
In Kolkata, West Bengal, India.

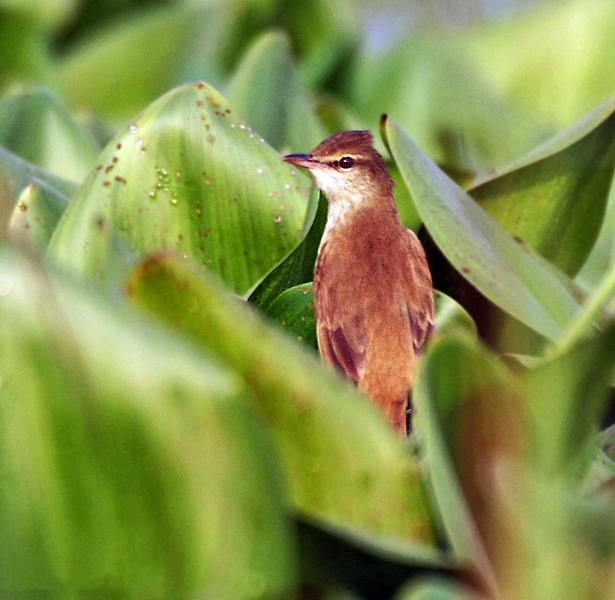
In Kolkata, West Bengal, India.

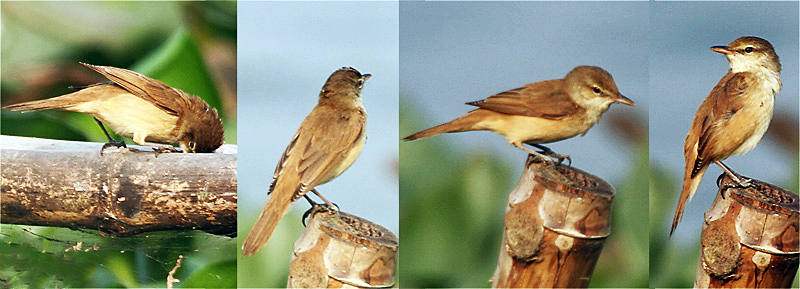
In Kolkata, West Bengal, India.

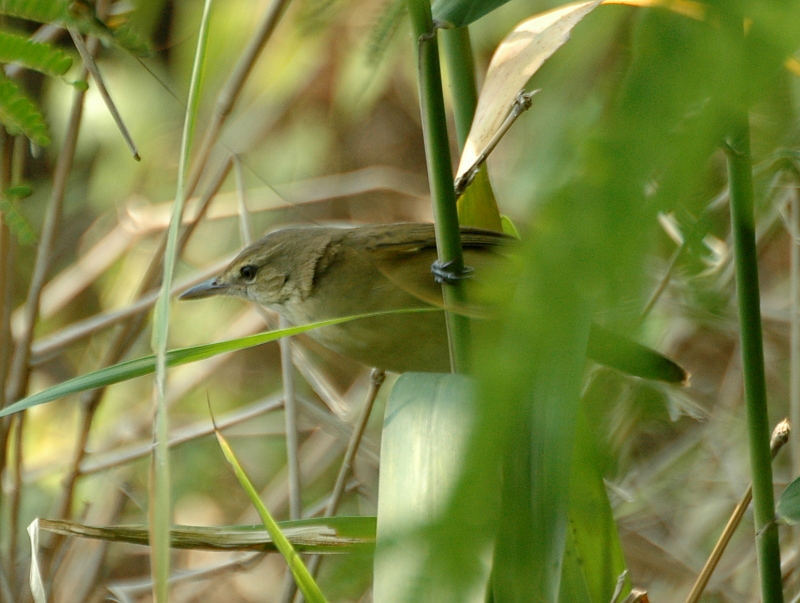
Mai Po, Hong Kong
