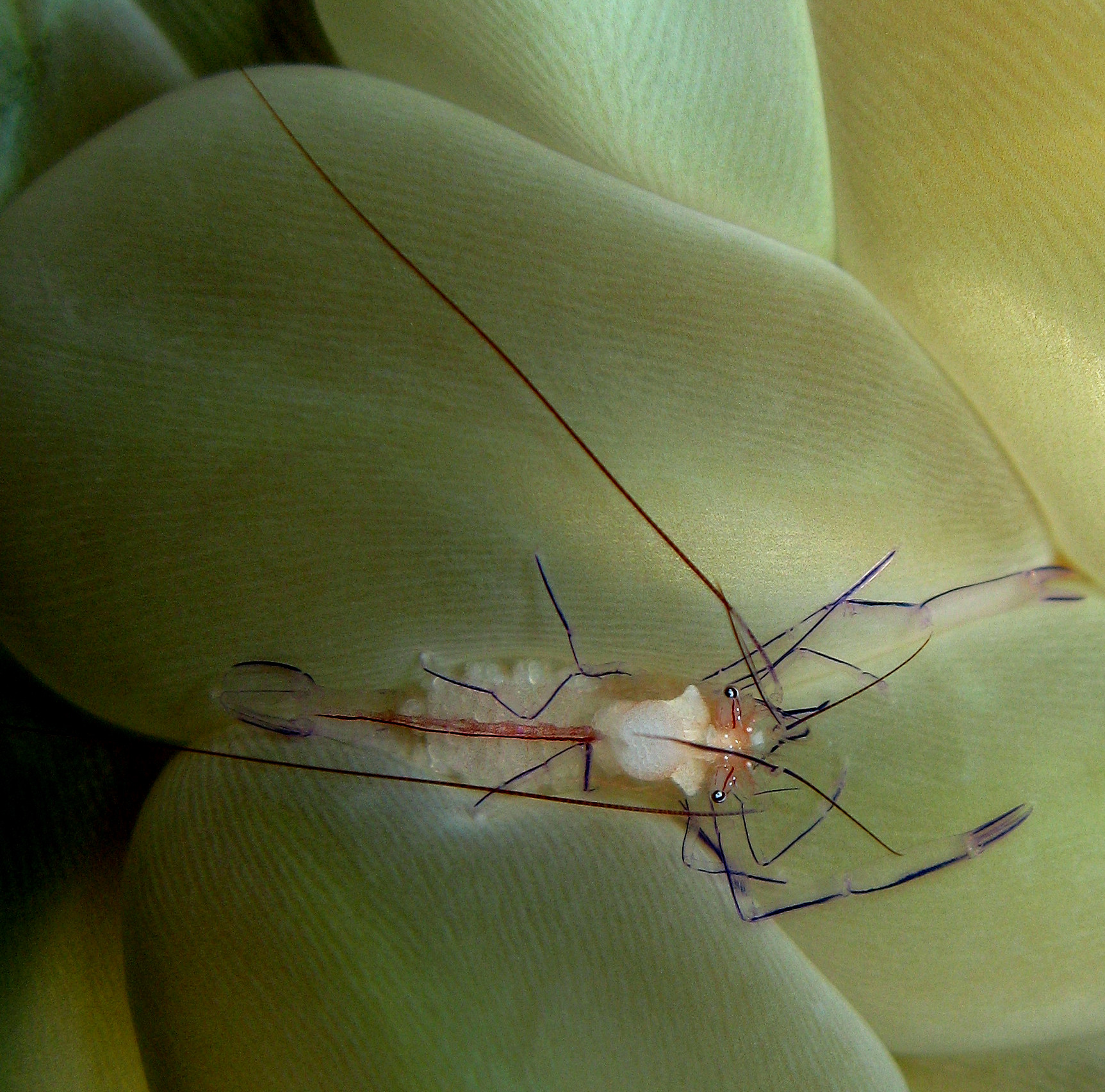
- Vir philippinensis on Plerogyra sinuosa

Scientific classification
- Domain: Eukaryota
- Kingdom: Animalia
- Phylum: Arthropoda
- Class: Malacostraca
- Order: Decapoda
- Suborder: Pleocyemata
- Infraorder: Caridea
- Family: Palaemonidae
- Genus: Vir; Holthuis, 1952

= Vir (crustacean) =

Genus of crustaceans

Vir is a genus of shrimp comprising the following species:

- Vir colemani Bruce, 2003
- Vir euphyllius Marin & Anker, 2005
- Vir longidactylusa Marin, 2008
- Vir orientalis (Dana, 1852)
- Vir philippinensis Bruce & Svoboda, 1984
- Vir smiti Fransen & Holthuis, 2007
