= Mandrell =

Mandrell is a surname. Notable people with the surname include:

- Barbara Mandrell (born 1948), American country music singer and musician
- Irlene Mandrell (born 1956), American musician
- Louise Mandrell (born 1954), American country music singer

== See also ==
- Mandrel
- Mandrill
- Mandrella
