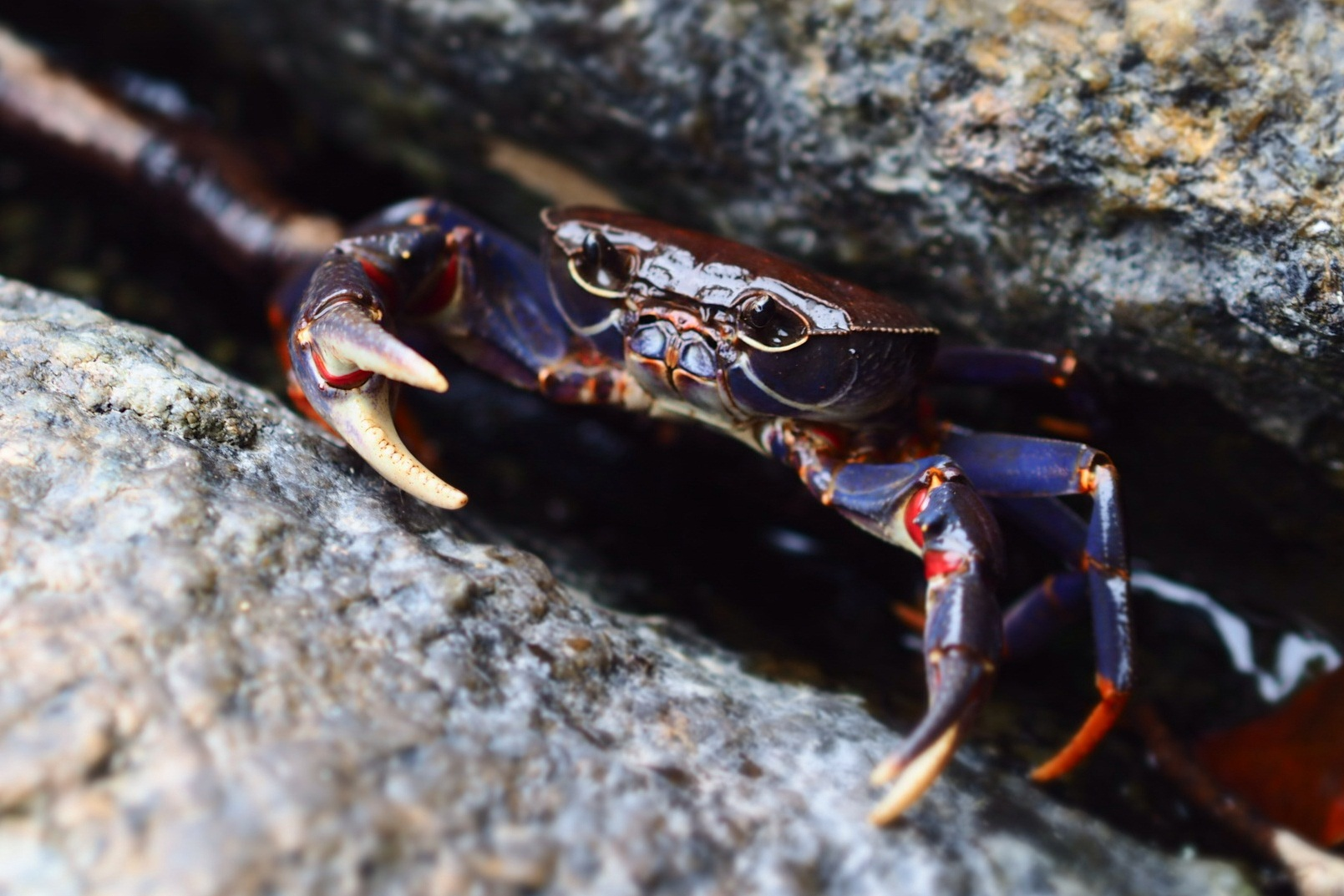

Conservation status
- Least Concern (IUCN 3.1)

Scientific classification
- Domain: Eukaryota
- Kingdom: Animalia
- Phylum: Arthropoda
- Class: Malacostraca
- Order: Decapoda
- Suborder: Pleocyemata
- Infraorder: Brachyura
- Family: Potamidae
- Genus: Demanietta
- Species: D. renongensis

Binomial name
- Demanietta renongensis (Rathbun, 1904)

Synonyms
- Potamon (Potamonautes) renongensis Rathbun, 1904; Potamon (Ranguna) tenasserimensis smalleyi Bott, 1966

= Demanietta renongensis =

Species of crab

Demanietta renongensis is a waterfall crab found in the Malay Peninsula: Southern Thailand, ranging from Chumphon to Trang, and Peninsular Malaysia. It is a common and abundant species.
