= Manella =

Manella is a surname. Notable people with the surname include:

- Luiz Manella (born 1995), Brazilian-born American figure skater
- Nora Margaret Manella (born 1951), American judge

== See also ==
- Mandrel
- Mandrill
- Mandrella
