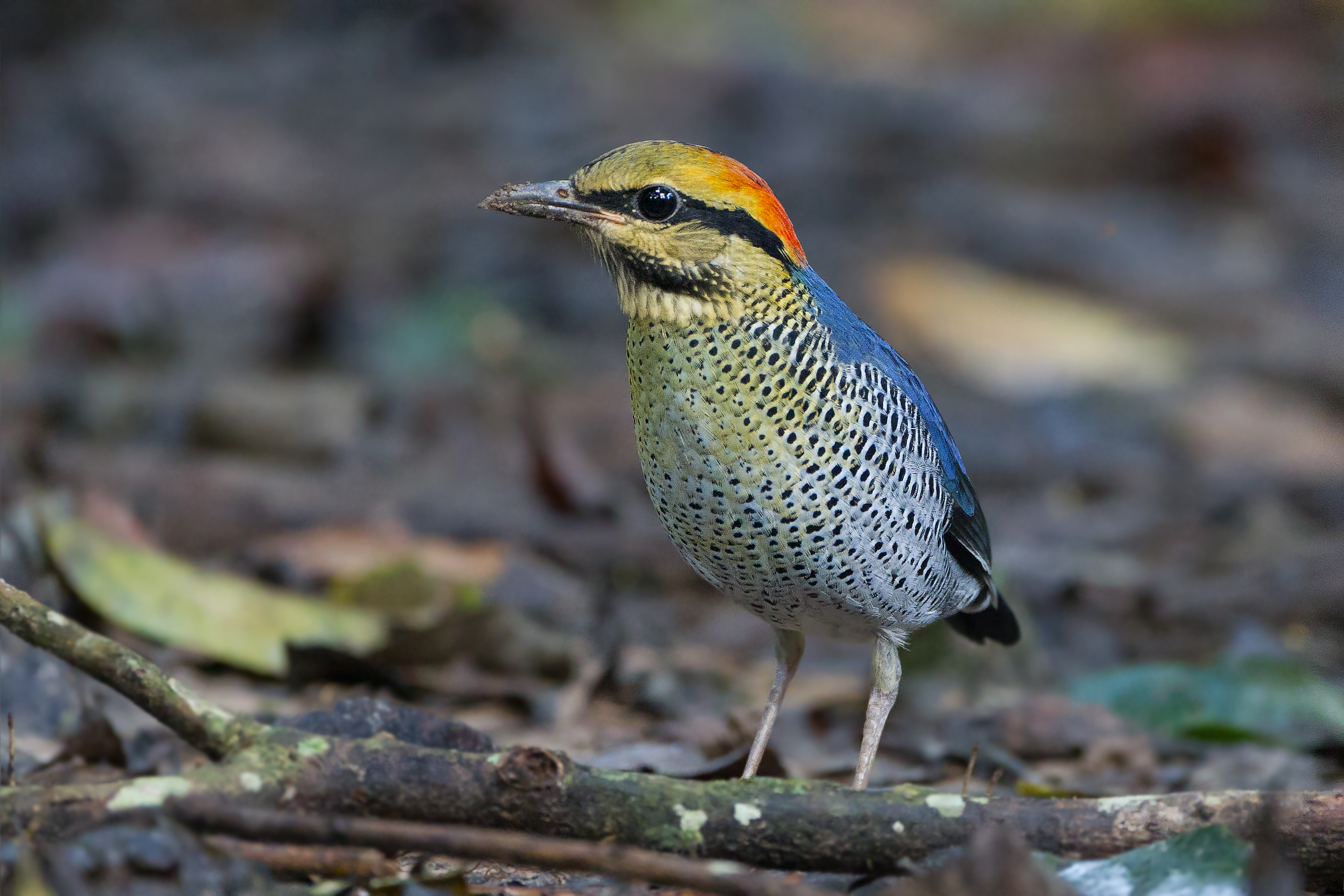

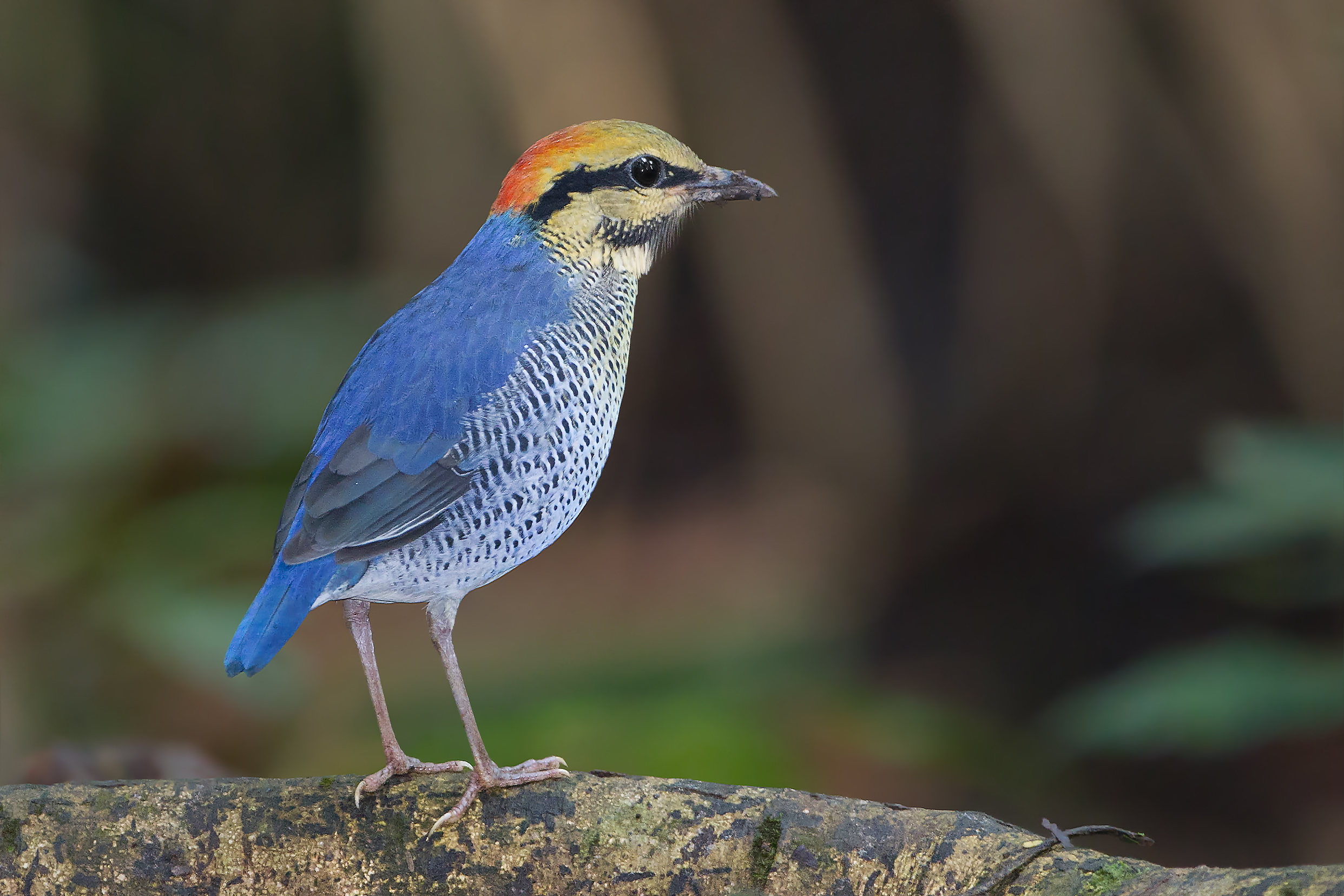

Conservation status
- Least Concern (IUCN 3.1)

Scientific classification
- Kingdom: Animalia
- Phylum: Chordata
- Class: Aves
- Order: Passeriformes
- Family: Pittidae
- Genus: Hydrornis
- Species: H. cyaneus

Binomial name
- Hydrornis cyaneus (Blyth, 1843)

Synonyms
- Pitta cyanea

= Blue pitta =

Species of bird

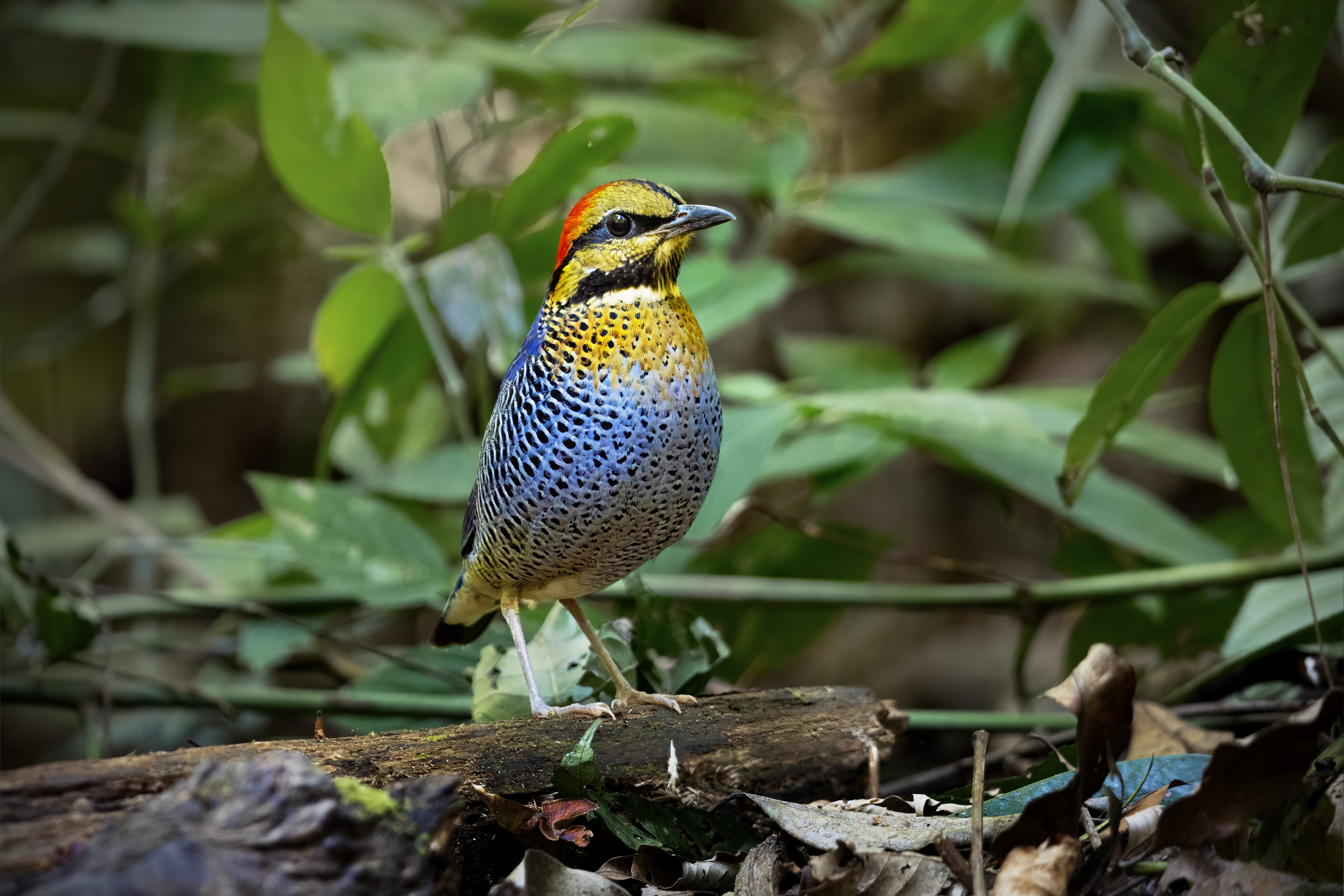
ssp. willoughbyi

The blue pitta (Hydrornis cyaneus) is a species of bird in the family Pittidae found in the northeastern Indian subcontinent, southern China, and Indochina. It typically lives in moist forests but can also inhabit dry forest. It is an unobtrusive, solitary bird which feeds by foraging on the ground for insects and other small invertebrates.

== Description ==
Pittas are medium-sized, stocky passerine birds with long legs and short tails. The blue pitta grows to a length of about 23 cm (9 in). It has a yellow forehead and crown and a bright orange nape. A bold black stripe passes through the eye and there is a less well-defined, short stripe on the chin. The male has a blue back and tail and a pale bluish breast, speckled with black. The female has a grey back and a pale grey breast, speckled with black. The bill is dark grey and the legs are pale pink. The call is a long, drawn-out "pleoow-whit" or "choocoo-whip", ending suddenly.

== Distribution and habitat ==
There are three subspecies: H. c. cyaneus occurs in northeastern India and eastern Bangladesh, Myanmar, northern Laos, Vietnam, southern Thailand and southern China; H. c. aurantiacus occurs in eastern Thailand and southwestern Cambodia; H. c. willoughbyi occurs in central Laos and southern Vietnam. The bird's altitudinal range is from sea level up to about 2,000 m (6,600 ft). It is a forest bird, typical habitat being lowland and montane moist evergreen forest with bamboos, often near streams and in ravines, but it also occurs in drier tropical forests.

== Ecology ==
Like other members of their genus, blue pittas are shy, secretive birds and usually occur singly, even juveniles foraging alone except when being visited by their parents; they will however respond to recordings of their call. They are diurnal, which enables them to see their often cryptic prey, but they often forage in darker areas of the forest. They search through plant litter on the forest floor for insects (especially beetles) and their larvae, spiders, snails, worms and grubs, flicking away leaves and probing the ground with their beaks. Breeding takes place in May and June in India and Myanmar, and between June and October in Thailand. The nest is a large, bulky dome-shaped structure with a side entrance, hidden amongst tangled plant growth.

== Status ==
The blue pitta has a very wide range and although scarce in India and China, is common in suitable habitat over much of its range, being particularly abundant on the Bolaven Plateau in Laos. It is present in some protected areas, and the International Union for Conservation of Nature has assessed its conservation status as being of "least concern".
