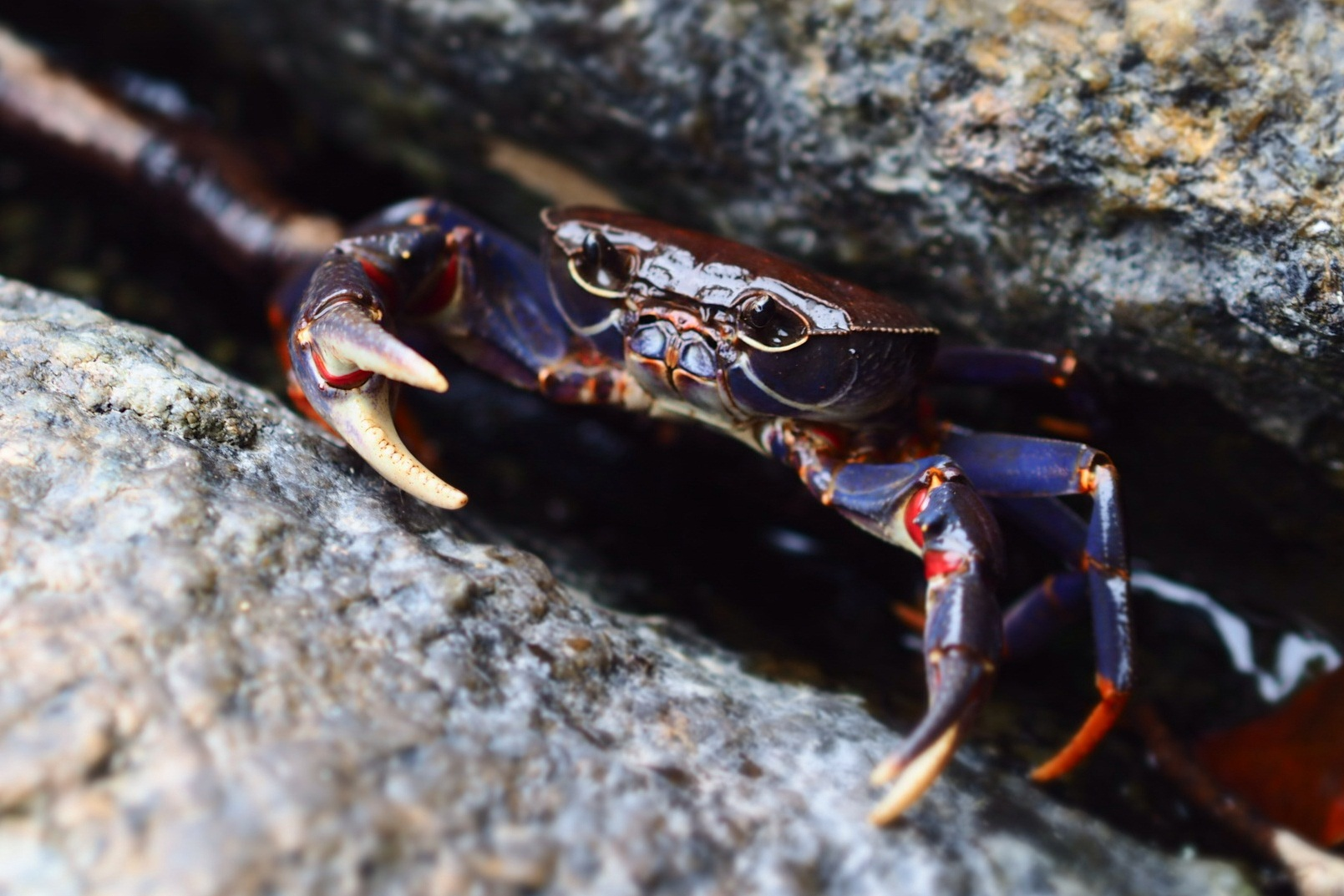
- Demanietta renongensis
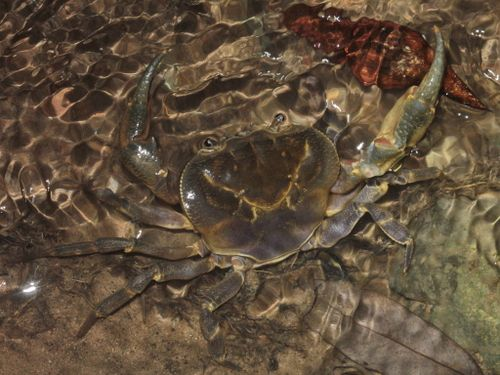
- Demanietta suanphung

Scientific classification
- Kingdom: Animalia
- Phylum: Arthropoda
- Clade: Pancrustacea
- Class: Malacostraca
- Order: Decapoda
- Suborder: Pleocyemata
- Infraorder: Brachyura
- Family: Potamidae
- Genus: Demanietta; Bott, 1966

Type species
- Potamon (Potamon) manii (Rathbun, 1904)

= Demanietta =

Genus of crabs

Demanietta is a genus of freshwater crabs that belongs to the family Potamidae. Members of this genus can be found in the Indochinese Peninsula of Southeast Asia in countries such as Thailand and Myanmar.

Most of them are found in fast flowing water habitats, giving their common name waterfall crabs or the spectacled waterfall crabs.

== Taxonomy ==
The genus currently contains 13 described species. They are listed below:

- Demanietta huahin Yeo, Naiyanetr & Ng, 1999
- Demanietta khirikhan Yeo, Naiyanetr & Ng, 1999
- Demanietta lansak Yeo, Naiyanetr & Ng, 1999
- Demanietta lenya Shi et al. 2020
- Demanietta liui Shi et al. 2020
- Demanietta manii (Rathbun, 1904)
- Demanietta merguensis (Bott, 1966)
- Demanietta nakhons Yeo, Naiyanetr & Ng, 1999
- Demanietta renongensis (Rathbun, 1904)
- Demanietta smalleyi (Bott, 1966)
- Demanietta suanphung Yeo, Naiyanetr & Ng, 1999
- Demanietta thagatensi (Rathbun, 1904)
- Demanietta tritrungensis (Naiyanetr, 1986)

=== Taxonomic history ===
The genus was established in 1904 by Rathbun with its type species being Demanietta manii. From that point the genus would contain four species (D. manii, D. smalleyi, D. merguensis and D. tritrungensus). In 1999, 10 new species (D. huahin, D. khirikhan, D. lansak, D. nakhonsi and D. suanphung) were described by (Yeo, Naiyanetr & Ng) during revision of the genus. Two more species, D. liui and D. lenya, would be described on 2020.

Thaiphusa sirikit was originally describes as Demanietta sirikit before being moved to its current genus.
